= V. Shantaram filmography =

List of films directed by V. Shantaram

V. Shantaram (18 November 1901 – 30 October 1990) was an Indian filmmaker who worked in Marathi and Hindi cinema. He began his career during the silent-film era and made his directorial debut with Netaji Palkar in 1927. He was a co-founder of the Prabhat Film Company in 1929 and later established Rajkamal Kalamandir in 1942. His career spanned the transition from silent films to sound and colour, and his films included social dramas, historical and biographical films, and musicals. He directed 55 films, produced 92 films and acted in 25 films during his career. His filmography includes Ayodhyecha Raja (1932), Amrit Manthan (1934), Sant Tukaram (1936), Kunku (1937), Manoos (1939), Dr. Kotnis Ki Amar Kahani (1946), Jhanak Jhanak Payal Baaje (1955) and Do Ankhen Barah Haath (1957).

Shantaram in 1943

Shantaram's films addressed social and contemporary issues alongside themes of entertainment and spectacle. Films such as Kunku (1937), Manoos (1939), Shejari (1941), Dahej (1950) and Teen Batti Char Raasta (1953) dealt with subjects including women's rights, social prejudice, communal harmony, dowry and social divisions. His films also received recognition at international film festivals, with Sant Tukaram (1936) receiving an award at the Venice International Film Festival, Do Ankhen Barah Haath (1957) receiving the Silver Bear at the Berlin International Film Festival, and Amar Bhoopali (1951) receiving a technical award at the Cannes Film Festival in 1952. In addition to directing, Shantaram worked as an actor, producer and editor, and was involved in the development of Prabhat Film Company and Rajkamal Kalamandir. He received the Dadasaheb Phalke Award in 1985 and was posthumously awarded the Padma Vibhushan in 1992. His films and filmmaking techniques have been cited as influential in the development of Indian cinema.

== As director ==
Year	Title	Language	Notes
1927	Netaji Palkar	Silent Film	Debut film
1929	Gopal Krishna	Silent Film	
1930	Udaykal	Silent Film	
1930	Rani Saheba	Silent Film	
1930	Khooni Khanjar	Silent Film	
1931	Chandrasena	Silent Film	
1932	Maya Macchindra	Silent Film	
1932	Ayodhyecha Raja	Marathi	First Marathi talkie film
1932	Agnikankan: Branded Oath	Hindi/ Marathi	
1933	Sinhagad	Marathi	
1933	Sairandhri	Marathi	
1934	Amrit Manthan	Hindi/Marathi	
1935	Dharmatma	Hindi/Marathi	
1935	Chandrasena	Hindi/Marathi	
1936	Amar Jyoti	Hindi	
1937	Kunku	Marathi	
1939	Manoos	Marathi	
1941	Padosi	Hindi/Marathi	
1943	Shakuntala	Hindi	
1944	Parbat Pe Apna Dera	Hindi	
1946	Dr. Kotnis Ki Amar Kahani	Hindustani/ English	
1947	Lokshahir Ram Joshi	Marathi	
1949	Apna Desh	Hindi	
1950	Dahej	Hindi	
1951	Amar Bhoopali	Marathi	CST Award for Best Artist-Technician
1952	Parchhain	Hindi	
1953	Teen Batti Char Raasta	Hindi	
1953	Surang	Hindi	
1954	Subah Ka Tara	Hindi	
1954	Mahatma Kabir	Hindi	
1955	Jhanak Jhanak Payal Baaje	Hindi	National Film Award for Best Feature Film
1955	Nightmare In Red China	English	
1957	Do Ankhen Barah Haath	Hindi	National Film Award for Best Feature Film
1959	Navrang	Hindi	
1961	Stree	Hindi	Selected for Indian submissions for the Academy Award for Best International Feature Film
1963	Sehra	Hindi	
1965	Ladki Sahyadri Ki	Hindi/Marathi	
1965	Geet Gaya Patharon Ne	Hindi	
1967	Boond Jo Ban Gayee Moti	Hindi	
1971	Jal Bin Machhli Nritya Bin Bijli	Hindi	
1972	Pinjara	Marathi	National Film Award for Best Marathi Feature Film
1975	Chandanachi Choli Anga Anga Jali	Marathi	
1977	Chaani	Marathi	
1986	Jhanjhaar	Hindi	

== As actor ==
Year	Title	Role	Language	Notes
1921	Surekha Haran	Krishna	Silent Film	
1923	Sinhagad	Shelar Mama	Silent Film	
1924	Sati Padmini	Padmini's husband	Silent Film	
1925	Savkari Pash	Hariba	Silent Film	
1927	Murali Wala	Krishna	Silent Film	
1930	Udaykal	Shivaji	Silent Film	
1946	Dr. Kotnis Ki Amar Kahani	Dwarkanath Kotnis	Hindi	
1952	Parchhain	Deepak	Hindi	
1954	Subah Ka Tara	Drunkman	Hindi	Cameo
1957	Do Ankhen Barah Haath	Jailor Adinath	Hindi	
