= List of Hindi films of 1930 =

A list of films produced by the Bollywood film industry based in Mumbai in 1930:

== A-B ==
Title	Director	Cast	Genre	Notes Cinematographer
A Prince Indeed a.k.a. Veer Bhushan	Keshavlal Joshi	Laxmi, Bachchu, Suleman Master, Drupad Bhatt	Costume	Surya Film Company, Bangalore. DOP: Vishnu Sawant
Ace Of Swords a.k.a. Talwar Ka Phani	Harshad Mehta	Mumtaz, Ata Mohammed, Jani Babu, Nizam	Costume	Bombay Mehta-Luhar Productions DOP: Chimanlal Luhar
Alik Babu a.k.a. Master Liar	Dhiren Ganguly	Dhiren Ganguly, Radha Rani, D. R. Das, Kalipada Das, Satya Sindhu	Social	British Dominion Films Ltd. Calcutta DOP: Krishna Gopal, P. Sanyal
All For The Crown a.k.a. Khooni Taj	Pandurang Talegiri	Wamanrao Kulkarni, Yasho Verma, Gangoobai, Jairam Desai		United Pictures Syndicate, Bombay. DOP: Pandurang Talegiri
Amar Kirti	Prafulla Ghosh	Rampyari, Vishnu, Abdul Pahelwan, Hydershah Abdul Pahelwan		Krishna Film Co DOP: Gordhanbhai Patel
An Ideal Woman a.k.a. Adarsh Ramani	V. K. Pattani	Shankar, Miss Mani		Mahavir Photoplays, Hyderabad
Arunodaya a.k.a. The Rising Sun (Dawn)	Bhagwati Mishra	Master Vithal, Nirasha, Yakub, Boman Irani, Wamanrao, Syed Husen, Manekbai	Costume	Sagar Movietone. DOP: Boman Irani
Avarice a.k.a. Aghor Lalsa	Harilal M. Bhatt	Shankar, Miss Mani		Mahavir Photoplays, Hyderabad. DOP: Gatubhai Vaidya
Avenged a.k.a. Ver Vasul	M. Udwadia	Shahzadi, Udwadia, Malka	Costume	Mahesh Film Company, Vivekanand Pictures
Bandit Of Baghdad a.k.a. Baghdad Nu Baharvatiyo	Narayan Deware	J. K. Nanda, Elizer, Jamuna, Rajababu, Usha, Ganibabu	Action, Costume	Kohinoor United Artists
Beggar Meets Beggar a.k.a. Rajdoot	Haribhai Desai	Zebunisa, Bachchu, Zhunzharrao Pawar, Abbasi, Baburao Gade	Costume	Surya Film Co., Bangalore
Behram the Bandit a.k.a. Baharvatiyo Behram	Saqi	Shahzadi, Saqi	Costume	Asiatic Film Company.
Beloved Rogue a.k.a. Albelo Sawar	Nagendra Majumdar	E. Billimoria, Putli	Action	Ranjit Film company
Benevolent Bravery a.k.a. Shurana Sangram	Mohanlal Shah	Gulab, Haridas, Vishnu, Durga, Gangaram Sardar	Action	Krishna Film Company. DOP: Chaturbhai Patel
Bharat Ramani a.k.a. The Enchantress of India	Jyotish Bannerji	Seeta Devi, Patience Cooper, Dadabhai Sarkari, Lalita Devi	Historical	Madan Theatres Ltd.
Bhimsen the Mighty	N. D. Sarpotdar	Joraswamy Sandow, Lalita Pawar, Jadhavrao Bhaurao Datar, Durgabai Koregaonkar, Miss Umrao, P. N. Varne	Mythology	Aryan Film Co. Dop: Y. D. Sarpotdar
Brand Of Fate a.k.a. Bhola Shikar	Ramakant-Gharekhan	Sultana, Madanrai Vakil, Salvi	Social	Imperial Film Company. Dop: Rustom Irani

== C-D ==
Title	Director	Cast	Genre	Notes Cinematographer
Champion Of The Sword			Action	
Chatur Sundari a.k.a. Clever Beauty (Wily Heroine)	N. D. Sarpotdar	Lalita Pawar, Amboo, Das, Baburao Datar, Joraswamy Sandow, Salvi, H. Dhodke, Jadhavrao	Action	Aryan Film Company
Cinema Girl	Bhagwati Prasad Mishra	Ermeline, Prithviraj Kapoor, Mazhar Khan, Akbar Nawaz, Baby Devi	Social	Imperial Film Company. DOP : Rustom Irani
Daily Mail	Narayan Deware	Khalil, Kumudini, Jamuna, Bhoparkar, Alavali, Thomas	Action Adventure	Kohinoor United Artists
Daughter Of Akhtar Nawaz Outlaw	N. G. Deware	Jamuna, Ebrahim, Fatima, Gani Babu, Pawar		
Devdasi	Naval Gandhi	Zubeida, Raja Sandow, Lovji Lavingia, Nilkanth Swami	Social	International Pictures Corpn
Devil Of The Cave a.k.a. Math No Sadhu	Kanjibhai J. Rathod	Naresh Niranjan, Tara, Ghanshyam		Kohinoor United Artists. DOP: Chaturbhai Patel
Devotee a.k.a. Prem Diwani	A. P. Kapoor	Balabhai, Promoth Bose, Bijlee, Devi Singh, Salu, Sankatha Prasad	Costume	Suryodaya Film Company. DOP: Naval Bhatt
Dhoomketu	Sundar Rao Nadkarni	Bachchu, Laxmi, Baburao Gade	Action	Surya Film Company, Bangalore. DOP: D. B. Chauhan
Divine Dowry a.k.a. Dehna Dan (Mrignayani)	Nanubhai Vakil	Inamdar, Putli, Baba Vyas, Bhagwat, Manilal, Thatte	Costume	Ranjit Studios. DOP: G. G. Gogate
Divine Sabre a.k.a. Daivi Khadag	G. P. Pawar	Tarabai, Zhunzharro Pawar, Lakshmi, Jamu Patel, Ganpat Bhakre	Historical	Surya Film Company, Bangalore. DOP: D. B. Chauhan
Dukhiyari a.k.a. Unhappy Woman	V. M. Vyas	Pawar, Bhupatkar, Usha, Bulbule, Panna	Social	Kohinoor Film Company. DOP: Vishnu Vyas

== E-H ==
Title	Director	Cast	Genre	Notes Cinematographer
Fall Of Pride a.k.a. Garva Khandan	M. Udwadia	Zubeida, Udvadia, Talpade	Costume Action	Vivekanand Pictures, Jagtap Pictures. DOP: V. B. Jagtap
Fall Of Raigad a.k.a. Raktacha Sood (Lohini Vasulat)	P. S. Talegiri	Gangoobai, Jairam Desai, Sunder Rao Nadkarni, V. S. Bapat, Wamanrao Kulkarni, Baburao Gade, Dattopant Sohoni	Costume Historical	United Pictures Syndicate. DOP: Y. D. Sarpotdar
Fatal Arrow a.k.a. Khooni Teer	A. P. Kapoor	Nandram, Zebunisa, Sankatha Prasad, Promoth Bose, Joshi	Fantasy	Naval Kapoor Productions. DOP: Naval Bhatt
Father India a.k.a. Hamara Hindustan	R. S. Choudhary	Sulochana (Ruby Myers), Jal Merchant, Mazhar Khan, Mehtab, Madanrai Vakil, Jilloobai, Jamshedji	Social	Imperial Film Company, Patel Brothers. DOP: Adi Irani
Fight Up to Death	Nagendra Majumdar	P. Jairaj, Madhuri, Bhaduri, Kale	Costume	Young India Pictures
Fighting Chevalier	H. Desai	Jena, Bhakre, Roshan, Patel	Action	Surya Film Company
Flames Of Flesh a.k.a. Kamonar Agun	Dhiren Ganguly	Debaki Bose, Dhiren Ganguly, Radharani and Sabita Devi	Historical	British Dominion Films production.
Flogged Into Love a.k.a. Chabuk Ne Chamkare	Baburao	Zebunisa, Bachchu, Baburao Gade, Zhunzharrao Pawar	Costume	Surya Film Company, Bangalore. DOP: Mohammed
Gambler a.k.a. Jugal Jugari	Fram Sethna	Jamuna, Baburao Apte, Miss Jones, Heera, Raja Babu	Social	Kohinoor United Artists. DOP: Bimal C. Mitra, K. G. Gokhale
Ganesh Janma	Jal Ariah	Patience Cooper, Indira Devi	Religious	Madan Theatres Ltd.
Glittering Sword a.k.a. Tati Talwar	Kanjibhai Rathod	Gulab, Haidershah, Durga, Pahelwan, Vishnu, Wamanrao	Costume	Krishna Film Company. DOP: Haribhai Patel
Glory Of India a.k.a. Noor-E-Watan	Jayant Desai	Inamdar, Sultana, Manilal, Baba Vyas, Shanti, Thatte	Historical	Ranjit Studios. DOP: Jamnadas Subedar
Goddess Of War a.k.a. Ranchandi	Homi Master	Khalil, Jamna, Kumar, Panna, Thomas	Costume	Kohinoor United Artists. DOP: K. G. Gokhale
Gulnar	D. A. Dandekar			Kohinoor United Artists. DOP: K. G. Gokhale
Himmat-E-Mard a.k.a. Dare Devil	Prafulla Ghosh	Rampyari, Haidershah, Abdul Pahelwan, Arab Sandow	Action	Krishna Film Co. DOP: Gordhanbhai Patel
Hamara Hindustan a.k.a. Father India	R. S. Choudhary	Jal Merchant, Mazhar Khan, Mehtab, Ruby Myers, Madanrai Vakil, Jillobai, Jamshedji	Social	Imperial Film Company.

== I-O ==
Title	Director	Cast	Genre	Notes Cinematographer
Jai Vijay	N. D. Sarpotdar	Durga Koregaonkar, P. N. Varne, Das, Meera		Aryan Film Company. Dop: Y. D. Sarpotdar
Jawan Mard a.k.a. Dashing Hero	Jayant Desai	Baburao Sansare, Putli, Manilal		Ranjit Movietone. DOP: Jamnadas Subedar
Kal Parinaya a.k.a. Fatal Marriage	P. N. Ganguly	Seeta Devi, Patience Cooper, Dhiraj Bhattacharya, Naresh Mitra, Shanti Gupta, Sudhir Sanyal, Rajhans, Prakash Mani, Kartik Dey, Bhanu Bannerjee	Social	Madan Theatres Ltd. Jatin Das
Kamale Shamshir	Gharekhan	W. M. Khan, Mehtab	Costume	New Excelsior Film Co
Lanka Dahan a.k.a. The Burning of Lanka	R. Prakasa	Devaki, M. V. Raju, T. S. Mani	Mythology	General Pics Corporation, Madras. DOP: Raghupathy S. Prakasa
Khooni Khanjar a.k.a. Fighting Blade	V. Shantaram, Keshavrao Dhaiber	G.R. Mane, Sakribai, Ganpat Shinde, Bhosle, Vasant, Jai, Vijaya	Costume Action	Prabhat Film Company. DOP: S. Fattelal, Vishnu Govind Damle
Kindred Of The Dust a.k.a. Soneri Khanjar	Harshadrai Mehta	Navinchandra, Prabhashankar, Dorothy, Kamla, Lobo, Ata Mohammed, Datar, Vasant Mengle, Fazlu	Action	Mehta-Luhar Productions, Suresh Film Co. Ltd. Dop; Chimanlal Luhar
Laughing Chevalier	Harshadrai Mehta	Navinchandra, Prabhashankar, Mumtaz	Action Costume	Mehta-Luhar Productions, Suresh Film Co. Ltd. Dop; Chimanlal Luhar
Lekh Par Mekh a.k.a. Destiny Defied	Homi Master	Noor Mohammed, Heera, Thomas, Panna, Ganibabu		Kohinoor Film Company. Dop: K. G. Gokhale
Lions Claw a.k.a. Sinh No Panja	Pesi Karani	Zubeida, Nandram, Zebu, Asooji, Balabhai, Pramoth Bose	Action	Sharda Movietone
Love Angle	Jayant Desai	Zubeida, Inamdar.	Social	Ranjit Studios
Magic Flame a.k.a. Madhbhar Mohini	Nanubhai Vakil	Putli, Baburao Sansare	Fantasy	Ranjit Studios. DOP: Padurang S. Naik
My Darling a.k.a. Diwani Dilbar	Chandulal Shah	Dinshaw Bilimoria, Gohar Mamajiwala, Baburao Sansare, Baba Vyas, Thatte	Costume	Ranjit Studios. DOP: Pandurang S. Naik
Orphan Daughter a.k.a. Anathai Penn	Raja Sandow	Raja Sandow, Leela, Hiroji		Associated Films Ltd., Madras. DOP: G. G. Gogate
Outlaw Of Sorath a.k.a. Sora Thi Baharvatiyo	Nanubhai Vakil	Inamdar, Putli, Bhagwat, Manilal	Legend	Ranjit Studios

== P-R ==
Title	Director	Cast	Genre	Notes Cinematographer
Pahadi Kanya a.k.a. Wild Flower	Nandlal Jaswantlal	Dinshaw Bilimoria, Gohar, Kamla, Baba Vyas, Thatte		Ranjit Film Company. DOP: Pandurang S. Nayak
Parchasar	Debaki Bose	Dhirendranath Gangopadhyay, Radharani Nehru, Prem Kumari	Mythology	British Dominion Films Company.
Patal Padmini a.k.a. Beauty From Hell	Harshadrai Mehta	Zebunisa, Nandram, Janibabu, Joshi	Fantasy	Sharda Film Company. DOP: Chimanlal Luhar
Patan Ni Paniari a.k.a. Damsel of Hell	Homi Master	Bhupatkar, Iqbal, Panna, Ratanshah Sinor		Kohinoor Film Company. DOP: Vishnu Vyas
Patriot a.k.a. Desh Deepak	Nanubhai Vakil	Putli, Inamdar, Manilal, Damyanti, thatte, Bhagwat	Costume	Ranjit Studios. DOP: Jamnadas Subedar
Prithviraj Samyukta	N. D. Sarpotdar	Amboo, Balasaheb, Bhagirathi, H. Dhodke	Historical Drama	Aryan Film Company
Raj Kumari a.k.a. The Princess	Ramakant-Gharekhan	Mumtaz, Ata Mohammed, Navinchandra, Mangle	Costume	Suresh Film Corporation. DOP: G. K. Mehta
Raj Laxmi	Chandulal Shah	Gohar, Raja Sandow, Ghanashyam, Putli, Baba Vyas	Costume	Kohinoor Film Company. DOP: Pandurang S. Naik
Raj Mukut a.k.a. Royal Crown	Behram Vasania	Tara, Ratanshah	Costume	New Kohinoor Film Company.
Ram Rahim	K. P. Bhave	E. Billimoria, Gohar, W. M. Khan, Mazhar Khan, Jagtap	Social	Imperial Film Company. DOP: Sohrab Irani
Ranak Devi	Dhaiber, Nanubhai Vakil	Ishwarlal, Kamla, Baburao Sansare, Bhagwat, Bajar Battoo, Dhaiber, Manilal	Historical	Ranjit Studios. DOP: Jamnadas Subedar
Rani Saheba a.k.a. Her Highness/Bazarbattu	Chunilal Parekh, V. Shantaram	V. Shantaram, Keshavrao Dhaiber, Baburao Pendharkar, Anant Apte	Children	Prabhat Film Company
Radhe Shyam	Madhusudan Samarth	Laxmi, Bachu, Kamala, K. Rangarao	Mythology	Surya Film Company. DOP: D. B. Chauhan, Telang
Revenge a.k.a. Intaqam	K. P. Bhave	E. Billimoria, Sultana, Mazhar Khan, W. M. Khan, Baburao Sansare, Madanrai Vakil	Action	Imperial Film Company. DOP: Rustom Irani
Rogue Of Rajasthan a.k.a. Mewad No Mawali	Madanrai Vakil	E. Billimoria, Nirasha, Mehboob Khan	Action Historical	Sagar Movietone. DOP: Adi Irani
Romances Of Radha a.k.a. Rasili Radha	Nanubhai Vakil	D. Billimoria, Ishwarlal, Shanta Kumari, Thatte	Social	Ranjit Studios. DOP: G. G. Gogate
Rose Of Komalner a.k.a. Komalner Ni Kusum	Dhirubhai Desai	Jani Babu, Prabha Shankar, Lobo	Action	Suresh Film Corporation. DOP: G. K. Mehta
Royal Rivals a.k.a. Nai Roshni	Bhagwati Mishra	Ermeline, Jal Merchant, Yakub, Rajkumari	Costume	Sagar Movietone. DOP: Boman Irani
Royal Savage a.k.a. Kalika No Kop (1)	Haribhai Desai, Sundarrao Nadkarni	Roshan, Laxmi, Miss Jena, Zhunzharrao Pawar, Baby Gabroo, Ganpat Bakre, Baburao Gade	Costume	Lotus Productions, Surya Film Company, Bangalore. DOP: Vishnu Sawant

== S ==
Title	Director	Cast	Genre	Notes Cinematographer
Sparkling Youth a.k.a. Jagmagti Jawani	Nagendra Majumdar	P. Jairaj, Roshanara, Madhav Kale, Dixit		Chandrika Film Company. DOP: V. V. Date
Safdar Jung	Abdul Rashid Kardar	Gulzar Bai, Hiralal, Mumtaz, Baby Ila	Costume	United Players Corporation. DOP: K. V. Machwe
Sarfarosh a.k.a. Bravehearts	Abdul Rashid Kardar	Gul Hamid, Nazir, Ghulam Qadir, Miss Gulzar, Rafiq Ghaznavi, Hiralal, Mumtaz	Action	United Players Corporation, Lahore. DOP: K. V. Machwe
Secrets of the Night a.k.a. Raat Ki Baat	K. P. Bhave	Sulochana (Ruby Myers), Jal Merchant, Elizer, Salvi	Social	Imperial Film Company. DOP: A. P. Karandikar
She Wolf a.k.a. Meetha Zaher	A. P. Kapoor	Nandram, Heera, Pramoth Bose, Miss Salu	Costume	Based on the play Cymbeline. Sharda Film Company. DOP: A. D. Pawar
Sheikh Chilli a.k.a. Castles in the Air	Nanubhai Vakil	Ishwarlal, Shanta Kumari, Inamdar	Costume	Ranjit Film Company Dop: G. G. Gogate
Shepherd a.k.a. Farebi Shahzada	Abdul Rashid Kardar	Miss Gulzar, M. Ismail, Hiralal	Costume	United Players Corporation, Lahore. DOP:
Shrikanta	S. K. Bhaduri	Shanta Kumari	Social	Radha Film Company
Sindbad the Sailor	R. G. Torney	Mazhar Khan, Elizer, Jamshedji, Trikamlal, Khansaheb, Sushila, Wagle, Sakhu	Fantasy	Imperial Film Company. DOP: Rustom Irani
Son of a Shepherd a.k.a. Bhagyawan Bharwad	Hiralal Doctor	Shakuntala, Jal Merchant, Chhudekar		Kohinoor United Artists. DOP: Chaturbhai Patel
Song of Life	G. P. Pawar	Lalita Pawar, Gubbi Veerana, Amboo		Karnatak Pictures Corp., Bangalore

== T-Z ==
Title	Director	Cast	Genre	Notes Cinematographer
The Arabian Knight a.k.a. Sher-E-Arab	Bhagwati Mishra	Prithviraj Kapoor, Dewan Sharan, Indira Devi, Jagdish Sethi	Fantasy	Zarina Pictures. DOP: G. K. Karkhanis
the Bomb a.k.a. Vasant Bengali/Bengali Bomb	Pesi Karani	Ermeline, Jal Merchant, Jilloobai, Zaverbhai	Action	Imperial Film Company. DOP: Rustom Irani
The Comet a.k.a. Dhumketu	Sunderrao Nadkarni	Sultana, Bachu, Laxmi, Gade	Action	Surya Film Company, Bangalore. DOP: D. B. Chauhan
The Conqueror a.k.a. Veer Na Ver	Moti B. Gidwani	Master Vithal Gohar	Action	Sagar Film Company
The Curse a.k.a. Garib ni Hai	Asooji	Asooji, Joshi, Miss Salu, Sarla	Costume	Sharda Movietone. DOP: D. K. Patel
The Tigress a.k.a. Vifreli Waghan	Nanubhai Vakil	Ishwarlal, Putli, Bhagwat, Manila	Costume	Ranjit Studios. DOP: Jamnadas Subedar
The Tyrant	Harshadbhai Desai	Laxmi, Bachchu, Ganpat Bakre, Sharda	Costume	Surya Film Company, Bangalore
The Valiant a.k.a. Mard Ka Bachcha	Prafulla Ghosh	Haidar Shah, Rampyari, Abdul Pahelwan	Social	Krishna Film Company. DOP: Gordhanbhai Patel
The Web a.k.a. Dev Pech	Moti B. Gidwani	Master Vithal, Gohar Yakub, Godrej		Sagar Movietone DOP: Boman Irani
Triumph of Love a.k.a. Rasili Rani	Nagendra Majumdar	Madhuri, P. Jairaj, Mohan	Costume	Young India Pictures. DOP: V. V. date
Udaykal a.k.a. Thunder of the Hills	V. Shantaram, Keshavrao Dhaiber	V. Shantaram, Kamala Devi, Baburao Pendharkar, Bazar Battoo, G. R. Mane, Ebrahim, Keshavrao Dhaiber	Historical	Prabhat Film Company. DOP: Vishnupant Govind Damle, S. Fattelal
Valiant Princess	Kanjibhai J. Rathod	Gulab, Baburao Apte, Noor Mohammed Charlie, Pawar, Ghanshyam,	Costume	Kohinoor United Artists DOP: Chaturbhai Patel
Valli Kalyanam a.k.a. Subramanium	G. V. Sane	Sundarrao Nadkarni, Wamanrao Kulkarni, Gangu		United Pictures Syndicate. Dop: R. A. Kamble
Vasantsena a.k.a. The Toy Cart	Mohan Bhavnani	Enakshi Rama Rao, Kamaladevi Chattopadhyay, Nalini Tarkhud, J. K. Nanda		Indian Art Productions. Dop: K. V. Machwe
Veer Rajput	Naval Gandhi	Zubeida, Jal Khambata, Lovji Lavangia, Rupmati	Costume	Orient Pictures Corporation. DOP: Keki B. Homji
Vijay Kumar	H. M. Reddy	Prithviraj Kapoor, Ermeline, Mazhar Khan, Jamshedji, Khansaheb, Jilloobai	Historical	Imperial Film Company DOP: Rustom Irani
Vijeta a.k.a. Victor	Gunjal	Boman Shroff, Jayshree Janki, Sayani Atish, Dwarki	Costume	Shri Satyesh Pictures. DOP: Ambadas Kasture
Wages Of Virtue a.k.a. Satto Na Mad	Harshadrai Mehta	Jani Babu, Navinchandra, Prabha Shankar, Lobo, Ata Mohammed	Social	Mehta-Luhar Productions, Suresh Film Co. Ltd. DOP: Chimanlal Luhar
Whose Fault a.k.a. Kono Vank	Kanjibhai J. Rathod	Keshav Narayan Kale, Gulab, Bapurao Apte		Krishna Film Company Dop: Gordhanbhai Patel
Wronged Wife a.k.a. Rajput Ramani	Pesi Karani	Nandram, Zebu, Asooji, Joshi, Rajkumari, Kashar Butt		Sharda Film Company DOP: Naval Bhat
Yasmina	Prafulla Ghosh	Rampyari, Abdel Pahelwan, Hydershah, Arab Sandow	Costume	Krishna Film Co; DOP: Gordhanbhai Patel
