= Master Krishnarao =

Indian musician (1898–1974)

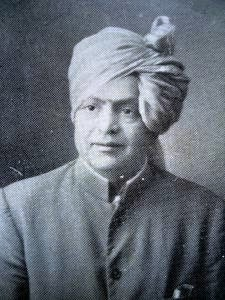
- Born: Krishnarao Ganesh Phulambrikar; 20 January 1898; Devachi Alandi
- Died: 20 October 1974 (aged 76); Pune, India
- Other name: Master Krishna
- Occupations: Classical musician Vocalist, Film and Drama artist
- Known for: Hindustani music Marathi Sangeet Natak; Marathi and Hindi film music
- Spouse: Radhabai Phulambrikar
- Children: Three
- Parent(s): Ganesh Phulambrikar; Mathurabai Phulambrikar
- Awards: Padma Bhushan; Sangeet Natak Akademi Fellowship; Vishnudas Bhave Gold Medal; Balgandharva Gold Medal; Sangeetkalanidhi
- Website: www.masterkrishnarao.com

Krishnarao Ganesh Phulambrikar (1898–1974), popularly known as Master Krishnarao, was a musical genius - an Indian vocalist, classical musician and composer of Hindustani music. He was credited with the creation of three Hindustani ragas and several bandishes. Phulambrikar, a recipient of the Sangeet Natak Akademi Fellowship, was also the music composer of several movies, including Dharmatma, a 1935 Hindi film starring Bal Gandharva, a renowned Marathi singer and Padosi, a 1941 directorial venture of V. Shantaram. The Government of India awarded him the third highest civilian honour of the Padma Bhushan, in 1971, for his contributions to music.

== Biography ==
Krishnarao Phulambrikar was born in 1898 at Devachi Alandi, a town in the periphery of Pune, in the western Indian state of Maharashtra to the Deshastha Brahmin couple Ganesh Phulambrikar (who was Vedmurti) and Mathura bai. He also ventured into Marathi theatre as a child artist by performing as an actor-singer in Sant Sakhu, a musical drama produced by Natyakalapravartak Mandali. He also acted in other musical dramas produced by this drama company. And at this drama company, he first got a chance to learn Indian classical music from Sawai Gandharva who used to act in the musical dramas of this company. Later, he approached the renowned singer, Bhaskarbuwa Bakhale in 1911 who trained the young boy in Gwalior, Agra and Jaipur gharanas of Hindustani music and their guru-shishya relationship lasted till Bakhale's death in 1922. The tutelage under Bakhale also gave him opportunity to meet and get associated with Bal Gandharva, who would later go on to become a noted Marathi singer. His first solo concert was when he was 13 years of age (he was awarded the title of Sangeet Kalanidhi in 1930 by Jagadguru Shankaracharya Dr.Kurtkoti), which preceded several concerts in India and abroad, including a trip to China as a Government of India delegate in 1953.

Phulambrikar served as the director of Pune Bharat Gayan Samaj, a music academy founded by his mentor Bhaskarbuwa Bakhale in Pune. Besides his career as a classical vocalist and as a film music composer, he scored music for several plays which included Menaka, Savitri, Asha-Nirasha, Amritasidhhi, Kanhopatra, Nand Kumar and Vidhi Likhit for Gandharva Sangeet Natak Mandali, a drama company founded by Bal Gandharva, during the period 1915–1933 and acted in a few of them. Later, he also composed music for a few plays such as Kulavadhu, Ek Hota Mhatara, Kone Eke Kali and Bhagyoday for Natyaniketan where the lead singer actress was Jyotsna Bhole. On the academic front, he compiled the compositions taught to him by Bakhale as well as his own compositions and published them as a 7-volume book, Raag Samgraha. Besides his notations are available in print under the titles, Rashtra Sangeet, Shishu Sangeet, Amar Sangeet, Mohan Maal, Natya Geet Notations and Chitra Geet Notations. He also tutored several musicians, film and drama artists. Ram Marathe, Yogini Joglekar, Saraswati Rane, Haribhau Deshpande, Anjanibai Kalgutkar, Madhusudan Kanetkar, Jaymala Shiledar, Dr.Pabalkar, Bapurao Ashtekar, Dattopant Bhope, Pitre buwa, Suhas Datar, Sudhakar Joshi, Ravindra Joshi, Mohan Karve, Rangnath Karkare, Shivram Gadgil, Balwant Dixit and his daughter, Veena Chitko are some of his notable disciples.

== Hindustani music career ==
Phulambrikar was known to have had expertise in khayal and Thumri traditions of classical music rendition and was aligned to the Agra gharana. He created several ragas by merging the nuances of different ragas; thus he created Tilak Kedar based on Tilak Kamod and Kedar ragas, Mangal Todi on Todi and Madhyam, Shiva Kalyan on Kalyan and Shivaranjani, Bilvabibhas on Bilaval and Bibhas and Jaunkali based on Jaunpuri and Ramkali ragas. He was reported to have initiated the practice of creating new Natyapadas and composed many bandishes such as Ratiya Mein Jagi (Rag Nayaki Kanada), Lalan Tumabina Kaun (Rag Kaunsi Kanada), Rang Rang Mukhape (Rag Adana), Chahu Barasan Lagi (Rag Bhopali), Kahu Ki Reet (Rag Malkaush), Hori Khela! Bahar (Rag Patdeep), E Ma Badal Aye (Rag Malhar), Mai Ri Aaj (Rag Hindol Bahar), Mai Pritam Karo Dulhan Pe (Rag Shiv Kalyan). Tori Binati, Shyamamohan Pyare, Khelat Hai Giridhari, Shyam Bajaye tore Gharame Muraliya, all in Rag Bhairavi, were some of his notable thumris in Bhairavi, earning him the sobriquet, Bhairavi ke Badshah and the style he developed came to be known as Khayali Thumri or Madhyamgram Thumri. He tuned the Indian national song, Vande Mataram, in Raag Jhinjhoti and tried unsuccessfully to promote the song as the national anthem. At the request of Dr. Babasaheb Ambedkar, Master Krishnarao composed music for Buddha Vandana and also sang it in his voice. Dr.Ambedkar arranged for its recording and that record was played during the mass conversion ceremony held at Nagpur on the 14th of October 1956.

== Film career ==
Soon after he received the Sangeet Kalanidhi title from Dr. Kurtkoti, the Shankaracharya of Karvir Peeth, he was contracted by Prabhat Film Company owned by V. Shantaram and other partners, to compose music for its forthcoming film, Dharmatma, where he was re-united with his old associate, Bal Gandharva, who played the role of Sant Eknath, the protagonist of the movie. The film which was released in 1935 had sixteen songs, many of them sung by Bal Gandharva. A year later, his next Hindi film was released under the name, Amar Jyoti, again a Prabhat Film Company production. The film was reported to have been critically acclaimed and was the first Indian film to be screened at the Venice Film Festival. Wahan, another Prabhat production released in 1937, this time with a new director, K. Narayan Kale, was his next film, followed by the musical Gopal Krishna in 1938 directed by Damle and S Fattelal. He composed music for 15 films which included Padosi, another Shantaram film and the film featured a ten-minute song, Lakh lakh chanderi, reportedly with complex choreography. He played the lead role of Sant Savata Mali in the movie Bhakticha Mala released by Rajkamal Kalamandir. He composed the music for this movie and also sang his own songs in this movie. Many aspiring composers of that period - Vasant Desai, C.Ramchandra, Sudhir Phadke, Purushottam Laxman Deshpande, Snehal Bhatkar, Dinkarrao Amembal (alias D Amel) and Gajananrao Watve got inspired by his school of musical thought.

== Honors and later years ==
Master Krishnarao Phulambrikar received the Vishnudas Bhave Gold Medal of the Government of Maharashtra in 1969 and the Government of India awarded him the civilian honor of the Padma Bhushan in 1971. He was the first recipient of the Balgandharv Gold Medal. The Sangeet Natak Akademi honored him with the Sangeet Natak Akademi Ratna Puraskar in 1972. In 1961, he suffered a facial paralysis which forced him to abandon his career as a singer in 1969. On his 60th birthday, a 9-day music conference was held in Pune, and many notable musicians across India attended. He died on 20 October 1974, at the age of 76. The story of his life has been documented in his biography, Bola Amrit Bola which was published posthumously in 1985. Every two years an award in his memory is presented to a music critic or author of music book by Maharashtra Sahitya Parishad, Pune. As his family originated from Phulambri in Marathwada, a drama theatre has been named "Master Krishnarao Phulambrikar Natyagruha" in Jalna, Marathwada in his honour. Every year, Pune Bharat Gayan Samaj celebrates his birth and death anniversaries. His daughter, Veena Chitko, who died in September 2015, was a notable light classical musician.

== Filmography ==
Film	Year	Director	Producer	Additional info
Dharmatma	1935	V. Shantaram	Prabhat Film Company	Originally titles Mahatma
Amar Jyoti	1936	V. Shantaram	Prabhat Film Company	Shanta Apte, who sang 3 songs, also acted in the film
Wahan	1937	K. Narayan Kale	Prabhat Film Company	Shanta Apte acted and sang in the film
Gopal Krishna	1938	Vishnupant Govind Damle, Sheikh Fattelal	Prabhat Film Company	Remake of 1929 silent film of the same name
Manoos	1939	V. Shantaram	Prabhat Film Company	Anil Biswas assisted in music composing
Aadmi	1939	V. Shantaram	Prabhat Film Company	Remake of Manoos
Padosi	1941	V. Shantaram	Prabhat Film Company	Bilingual in Hindi and Marathi, in Marathi the name was Shejari
Lakharani	1945	Vishram Bedekar	Prabhat Film Company	Durga Khote starrer
Vasantasena	1942	Gajanan Jagirdar	Prabhat Film Company	Film won the National award for second best Marathi film
Bhakticha Mala	1944	Keshavrao Date	Prabhat Film Company	Bilingual (Mali in Marathi), Krishnarao played the lead role
Meri Amanat	1947	Prabhakar Gupte and Shreekant Sutar	Vikas Picture	Krishnarao acted and sang in the film, music composed by Shridhar Parsekar
Sant Ramdas	1949	Raja Nene		Devotional film
Pooja	1954	Bhagwan Das Varma	Varma Films	Mohammed Rafi accompanied Krishnarao in the song Rumjhum Ke Bajao Bansari Murali
Keechak Vadh	1959	Tara Harish and Yashwant Pethkar	Manik Studios	Lata Mangeshkar sang a duet with Mohammed Rafi and three solos in the film
Vithu Majha Lekurwala	1962	Datta Dharmadhikari	Manik Studios	Asha Bhonsle sang a song in the film
Tai Telin	1967		Aryan Film Company	A biopic about Tai Telin

== See also ==
- Bal Gandharva
- Bhaskarbuwa Bakhale
- List of Marathi people
