= List of Marathi films of 1939 =

A list of films produced by the Marathi language film industry based in Maharashtra in the year 1939.

== 1939 Releases ==
A list of Marathi films released in 1939.

Year	Film	Director	Cast	Release date	Production	Notes	Source
1939	Manoos	Rajaram Vankudre Shantaram	Shahu Modak, Shanta Hublikar, Sundara Bai, Ram Marathe, Raja Paranjpe		Prabhat Films	Written by A. Bhaskarrao. Simultaneously made in Marathi and Hindi as Aadmi	
1939	Netaji Palkar	Bhalji Pendharkar	Lalita Pawar, Bakulabai, Bhaurao Datar		Arun Pics		
1939	Sant Tulsidas	Jayant Desai	Vishnupant Pagnis, Leela Chitnis, Keshavrao Date		Ranjit Movies	Simultaneously made in Marathi and Hindi	
1939	Brandichi Batli	Master Vinayak	Damuanna Malvankar, V.G. Jog, Salvi		Huns Pics	Simultaneously made in Marathi and Hindi as Brandy Ki Botal	
1939	Raja Shriyal	Keshavrao Dhaiber					
1939	Akrava Avtaar	Keshavrao Dhaiber					
1939	Devata	Master Vinayak	Baburao Pendharkar, Indira Wadkar, Meenakshi		Huns Pics		
1939	Sukhacha Shodh	Parshwanath Yeshwant Altekar	Baburao Pendharkar			Simultaneously made in Marathi and Hindi as Mera Haq	
