= Nalini Tarkhad =

Indian actress and novelist (1911–1954)

- Tarkhad c. mid-1930s
- Born: 1911
- Died: 1954 (aged 42–43); Bombay, India
- Occupations: Actress; novelist
- Years active: 1930–1936
- Spouse: Keshavrao Dhaibar
- Parent: Atmaram Pandurang Tarkhadkar (father)

Nalini Tarkhad (born 1911; died 1954) was an Indian actress and novelist who worked in silent and Hindi-language films. A college graduate, she was the daughter of physician and social reformer Atmaram Pandurang Tarkhadkar. She was the second Maharashtrian Brahmin woman to enter films, after Durga Khote.

Tarkhad began her career with the silent film Vasantsena (1930), followed by her sound-film debut in Pavitra Ganga (1932). She then joined Prabhat Pictures, where she starred in three high-profile productions: Amrit Manthan (1934), Chandrasena (1935), and Rajput Ramani (1936).

== Career ==
Tarkhad made her film debut as a "subsidiary heroine" in Mohan Bhavnani's Vasantsena (1930), at a time when film acting was considered taboo among women from high-society backgrounds. Pavitra Ganga (1932) marked her sound-film debut.

Tarkhad subsequently joined Prabhat Pictures, where she played a princess who attempts to overthrow a sacrificial cult in V. Shantaram's Marathi-Hindi film Amrit Manthan (1934). The film received acclaim at the Venice Film Festival and a favourable notice in The Illustrated London News. She went on to star in Shantaram's trilingual mythological film Chandrasena (1935), and appeared in her husband Keshavrao Dhaibar's Rajput Ramani (1936). The latter brought her wider public recognition, and her singing was also appreciated, although contemporary critics praised Shanta Apte's supporting performance more highly.

== Personal life and death ==
Tarkhad married film producer and director Keshavrao Dhaibar, following which she left the film industry. She then pursued writing and published an English-language novel, The Jahagirdar of Palna. At the time of her death, her second novel was being adapted into the film Teen Raten.

She died of cancer in Bombay in 1954, aged 43.

== Views on women in cinema ==
One of the earliest women from a high-society background to enter Indian cinema, Tarkhad advocated the participation of educated women in the film industry as professional actresses. In a December 1933 column titled "Cultured Girls and Cinema Acting", published in The Cinema Annual, she defended their right to pursue acting as a profession, writing:

"I am at a loss to understand why respectable girls are not expected to take up film acting as a profession. In the present economic depression this will be a means of support to many a cultured girl. We must not forget that not everybody in this world has a fat bank balance to work as an amateur and it is very narrow minded to expect honorary labour from the cultured ladies when the producer himself eagerly looks to making millions."

Tarkhad admired actresses such as Rajkumari of Burdwan, Devika Rani, and Durga Khote for their contributions to the performing arts.

Film scholar Debashree Mukherjee has noted that Tarkhad sought to establish her position in the film industry through her education and upper-class background. In a public statement, Tarkhad had emphasised the importance of "good birth" in the selection of actors and singers, distinguishing herself from actresses associated with the baiji tradition.

== Filmography ==
- Vasantsena (1930) – acting debut; silent film
- Pavitra Ganga (1932) – sound-film debut
- Amrit Manthan (1934) as Rani Mohini
- Chandrasena (1935) as Chandrasena
- Rajput Ramani (1936) as Taramati
