= Rani Saheba =

1930 film

- Directed by: V. Shantaram
- Written by: Baburao Pendharkar
- Produced by: Prabhat Film Company
- Starring: V. Shantaram; Keshavrao Dhaiber; Baburao Pendharkar; Anant Apte
- Cinematography: S. Fattelal; Vishnupant Govind Damle
- Production company: Prabhat Film Company
- Release date: 1930
- Country: India
- Languages: Silent film Marathi intertitles

Rani Saheba (My Queen) also called Bazarbattu is a 1930 Indian silent film. It is cited as the first children's film made in India. The film was co-directed by V. Shantaram and Keshavrao Dhaiber. The cinematographers were S. Fattelal and Vishnupant Govind Damle and the cast included Keshavrao Dhaiber, Baburao Pendharkar, V. Shantaram and Anant Apte.

Vishnupant Damle, Dhaiber, S. Fattelal and Shantaram had left the Maharashtra Film Company in 1929 to form their own company called Prabhat Film Company. With the success of their first silent film, Gopal Krishna (1929), the company produced five silent films in "quick succession", Khooni Khanjar (1930), Rani Saheba (1930), Udaykal (1930), Chandrasena (1931), and Zulum (1931). Out of these Rani Saheba and Khooni Khanjar are cited as some of the "lighter" films produced by Prabhat Films. Master Anant Apte was "nicknamed" 'Bazarbattu' following the success of his role in the film.

== Cast ==
- Keshavrao Dhaiber
- Baburao Pendharkar
- V. Shantaram
- Anant Apte
