= Narayan Hari Apte =

Marathi writer

- Born: 11 July 1889; Samdoli, Sangli district, India
- Died: 14 November 1971 (aged 82); Koregaon, Satara, India
- Occupations: Novelist, film story writer
- Years active: 1909–62

Narayan Hari Apte, popularly known as Nanasaheb Apte (11 July 1889 – 14 November 1971) was a Marathi popular novelist, writer of advice books and editor from Maharashtra, India.

== Early life and education ==
Apte was born on 11 July 1889 in the village of Samdoli in Sangli District of Maharashtra.

After finishing his 4th-grade education in Samdoli and Satara. He joined the New English School, Satara, for his high school studies . He left home in 1904 to participate in India's freedom movement by joining Vinayak Damodar Savarkar's Abhinav Bharat Society.

He was influenced as a writer of novels and collections of short stories by the great writer Hari Narayan Apte and was also influenced by the ideas of social reform movements of the 19th century in Maharashtra. His stories cover historical and social themes, which are based on the everyday life of the Marathi middle class.

He travelled extensively throughout northern India's parts like Rajasthan, Bengal (before partition in 1905) & Nepal; and while travelling, he gained knowledge of Hindi, Bengali, Gujarati, Nepali, and English languages. He stayed at Jaipur (Rajasthan) and taught in the school run by the freedom fighter Arjunlal Sethi. (Maharashtra state "Swatantyra Sainik Kosh-Paschim Vibhag"). He returned to Satara in 1913 and worked with Dattātraya Baḷavanta Pārasanīs (co-writer with Charles Augustus Kincaid), who wrote "a history of the Maratha people". He was tasked with translating the old Marathi documents in Modi script to standard Marathi and the English language, respectively.

In 1932, he met K. B. Hedgewar, the founder of Rashtriya Swayamsevak Sangh at Koregaon during the latter's visit to Koregaon, Aundh state, in August 1932 (संघ निर्मात्याचे हितगुज, पान १३) and joined the Rashtriya Swayamsevak Sangh. Although the RSS opposed it, Apte participated in the 1942 Quit India Movement.

== Career ==
Apte worked for some time as a co-editor of Kirloskar Khabar (किर्लोस्कर खबर). He founded a book publishing house, Ajinkyatara Pustkalay, in 1913. He started a literary and political journal named "Alhad" (आल्हाद) in 1915 and later, another magazine named Madhukar (मधुकर). He started a printing press, Shriniwas Mudranalay, in 1920, and he founded the publishing house "Apte & Co" in 1924.

Apte wrote over providing advice on ways to experience a happy family life. He also published two collections of his short stories. He propagated traditional Hindu values and beliefs through his writings. His first short story was published in Karamanuk (करमणूक) magazine, which was then edited by Hari Narayan Apte. His first novel Ajinkyatara (अजिंक्यतारा) was published in 1909. He wrote his last novel Javanancha Jiwandharma (जवानांचा जीवनधर्म), in 1962.

Baburao Painter in 1922, introduced Apte to the Marathi film industry, and Apte wrote screenplays for Marathi films mostly by adapting his own short stories and novels. His most famous work came in the 1930s, Prabhat for Shantaram at the Film Society. He also worked with directors Datta Dharmadhikari, Shantaram Athavale and Dinkar Patil.

Apte helped Dadasaheb Phalke during his bad days. Phalke stayed with the family at NH Apte's residence for almost one year at Koregaon village.

== Later life ==
His 80th birthday was celebrated at Koregaon with a group of visiting poets and writers from Pune.

== Novels ==
Mainly, Apte wrote social, advisory novels and historical novels.

The following are Apte's novels:

- Ajinkyatara (अजिंक्यतारा)
- Pahatepurwicha Kalokh (पहाटेपूर्वीचा काळोख)
- Bhagyashri (भाग्यश्री)
- Hrudayachi Shrimanti (हृदयाची श्रीमंती)
- Manawi Asha (मानवी आशा)
- Na Patanari Goshta (न पटणारी गोष्ट)
- Pach Te Pach (पाच ते पाच)
- Rajputache Bhishma (राजपुताचे भीष्म)
- Waiting Room (वेटिंग रूम)
- Ekti (एकटी)
- Punjabacha Ladhawayya Sikh (पंजाबचा लढवय्या सीख)
- Javanancha Jiwandharma (जवानांचा जीवनधर्म)

== Collections of short stories ==
- Banarasi Bore (बनारसी बोरे)
- Aram Wiram (आरामविराम)

== Advice books ==
The following is a partial list of Apte's advice books:

- Sukhacha Mulmantra (सुखाचा मूलमंत्र)
- Gruhasaukhya (गृहसौख्य)
- Ayushyacha Paya (आयुष्याचा पाया)
- Kuryat Sada Mangalam (कुर्यात सदा मंगलं)

== Filmography ==
- 1925
  - Sawakari Pash (Director: Baburao Painter, Producer: Maharashtra Film Company)
  - Rana Hamir (Director: Baburao Painter Producer: Maharashtra Film Company)
- 1933: Sinhagad. He wrote the screenplay for "Sinhagad" Baburao Painter directed the silent film Sinhgad for the Maharashtra Film Company.
- 1934: Amrit Manthan
- 1936: Rajput Ramani (Director: Keshavrao Dhaiber, Producer: Prabhat Film Company)
- 1937
  - Kunku in Marathi. Duniya Na Mane in Hindi Duniya Na Mane on YouTube Duniya Na Mane
  - Pratibha (Director: Baburao Painter, Producer: Shalini Cinetone) based on the novel Hrudayachi Shrimanti (हृदयाची श्रीमंती)
  - Gangawataran (Director: Madhukar Bavdekar)
- 1938: Dhruwa Kumar
- 1948: Bhagyarekha on YouTube (Producer: K.L.Tapre, Director: Shantaram Aathavle)
- 1951: Kunkwacha Dhani (Director: Datta Dharmadhikari)
- 1954: Sansar Karaychay Mala
- 1956: Sajni (Producer: Golden Pics, Director: Vasant Painter, Music: Sudhir Phadke, Lyrics: Pt. Narendra Sharma, Release Date: 1 January 1956, Genre: Social, Star Cast: Anoop Kumar, Lalita Pawar, Krishna Kumari, Sapru, Gope, Sulochana, Nimbalkar)
- 1960: Umaj Padel Tar (Director: Dinkar D. Patil)

=== Duniya Na Mane(Hindi) / Kunku (Marathi) ===
Duniya Na Mane is a 1937 Hindi social classic based on the Marathi novel, Na Patnari Goshta (न पटणारी गोष्ट) by Apte, who also wrote the film's screenplay. This film was released on Dussehra in 1937 <http://epaper.dnaindia.com/story.aspx?edorsup=Sup&wintype=popup&queryed=820043&querypage=1&boxid=27115212&id=29895&eddate=2012-10-21&ed_date=2012-10-21&ed_code=820043> and was shown at the Venice International Film Festival in 1937.

The movie was remade in Marathi as Kunku.

Kunku is the story of a young woman who refuses to accept her marriage to an older man. However, this presents its own problems for the young woman who is now widowed and subject to widowhood, a severe punishment in orthodox Hindu society. The film ends with the husband killing himself to set his wife free from him. Shantaram tells his story as realistically as possible, with background music limited to natural sounds. It was shown at the Venice International Film Festival. The storyline revolves around a young woman, Nirmala, rebelling against her arranged marriage to a much older widower, Kakasaheb, according to a social practice fairly prevalent in India until the second quarter of the 20th century.

After a long discussion with his widowed daughter Sushila, who is roughly Nirmala's age, Kakasaheb agrees to the only way out—suicide—since divorces were not possible in those times. Sushila also provides a forceful feminist speech to the young bride. Just before committing suicide, Kakasaheb implores his would-be wife to find a younger husband.

An interesting aspect of Duniya Na Mane is its characterisation: The widower is not a villain. He has acted without questioning the prevalent custom of his society and is now faced with the tragic consequences of that act.

=== Bhagyarekha (Marathi) ===
Bhagyarekha is the story of Manik, a young Gandhian freedom fighter who has a child out of wedlock. Condemned by all the members of her family except her mother, she battles on steadfastly, even after her lover dies in a police encounter, leaving her to fend for herself. The film, directed by Shantaram Athavale, also stars Baburao Pendharkar and harks back to an era when Marathi cinema tackled unconventional subjects. Keshavrao Bhole composed its music and Narayan Hari Apte wrote the songs, screenplay and dialogues.

=== Rajput Ramani (Marathi) ===
Rajput Ramani is an adventure movie. The movie shows a medieval Rajput court. The legendary warrior Mansingh (Phatak) is the nation's strong man, but he is cordially hated even by his own people. Claiming to have been offended by Taramati (Tarkhad), he insists to her eminent father that only a marriage (on terms insulting to her) can placate him. He becomes a dictator, imprisoning large numbers of people, and eventually, Taramati's father, also in prison, leads a popular revolt, threatening to kill his son-in-law.

Her father has little choice but to comply silently without protest. Mansingh soon evolves into an iron-fisted autocrat. He becomes a tyrant, imprisoning a large number of the population, including Taramati's father. The old man eventually leads a rebellion that almost kills the muscle-bound tyrant, but Taramati intercedes on behalf of her husband at the last moment.

=== Umaj Padel Tar (Marathi) ===
On the eve of a big US-Japan trade summit, a reporter gets a hot tip that the Japanese-American head of a big aerospace firm will be selling trade secrets to a Japanese contact. Intent on getting a scoop, the reporter hires private investigator John Blaylock to help her find out just what information is being handed over. In the course of snooping, the pair is discovered, but not before they learn that the Japanese contact is a member of the Yakuza. When the aerospace executive turns up dead after an apparent suicide, the investigators realise that some very big secrets are being kept by some very important people.

=== Amrit Manthan ===
Amrit Manthan, which was produced and directed by V. Shantaram. Shantaram used this film to comment subtly on life and times in contemporary society, too. He was the first director to use a telephoto lens for his film Amrit Manthan (1934). It uses several film techniques from the German Expressionist cinema. Apart from all its notable achievements, this film is best remembered for its shot of the close-up of a priest's right eye. This film is also important for introducing several talented artists such as Durga Khote and Shanta Apte to a film-hungry audience.

It tells the story of a very old society where Buddhism goes against orthodox ritualistic practices. This film was set in the Buddhist age and makes a strong statement against the practice of making human sacrifices. Avanti Nagar residents worship Devi Maa Chandika and sacrifice humans and animals to appease her. When Raja Krantivarma bans this sacrifice, his very own Rajguru rebels and incites a group of religious zealots to assassinate him
