= Khooni Khanjar =

1930 film

- Directed by: V. Shantaram; Keshavrao Dhaiber
- Written by: Baburao Pendharkar
- Produced by: Prabhat Film Company
- Starring: P. Jairaj; Sakribai; G. Shinde; Mane Pahelwan
- Cinematography: S. Fattelal; Vishnupant Govind Damle
- Production company: Prabhat Film Company
- Release date: 1930
- Country: India
- Language: Silent film

Khooni Khanjar (Fighting Blade) is a 1930 Indian silent film directed by V. Shantaram. The film was a costume action drama film co-directed by Keshavrao Dhaiber. It was produced by Prabhat Film Company. The cinematography was by Sheikh Fattelal and Vishnupant Govind Damle. The cast included Mane Pahelwan, Ganpat G. Shinde, P. Jairaj, Sakribai and Shankarrao Bhosle.

Shantaram had formed Prabhat Film Company in 1929 with Dhaiber, Damle and Fattelal and their first film Gopal Krishna was a big success commercially, which helped them produce five silent films in 1930–31. Khooni Khanjar was the first of them followed by Rani Saheba (1930), Udaykal (1930), Chandrasena (1931) and Zulum (1931).

== Cast ==
- G. R. Mane
- Vijaya
- Shankarrao Bhosle
- Vasant
- Jai
- Sakribai
- Ganpat Shinde
