= Vatsala Deshmukh =

Indian actress (1930–2022)

- Born: 1930; British Raj
- Died: 12 March 2022 (aged 92); Parel, India
- Occupation: Actress
- Children: Ranjana Deshmukh

Vatsala Deshmukh (Marathi: वत्सला देशमुख; 1930 – 12 March 2022) was an Indian Marathi and Hindi actress.

== Life and career ==
Deshmukh started her career as a model and later joined the show business. She made her screen debut with the Hindi movie "Toofan and Deeya", directed by Prabhat Kumar.

Deshmukh's younger sister, Vijaya Deshmukh, was married to V. Shantaram, and became known as an actress Sandhya Shantaram. Deshmukh was the mother of actress Ranjana Deshmukh.

== Selected filmography ==
- Toofan Aur Deeya (1956) as Dancer
- Navrang (1959) as Uma
- Iye Marathi Che Nagri (1965)
- Ladki Sahyadri Ki (1966)
- Mai Mauli (1971)
- Asheech Ek Ratra (1971)
- Ajab Tuje Sarkar (1971)
- Jal Bin Machhli Nritya Bin Bijli (1971) as Bhairavi
- Pinjara (1972) as Akka
- Naag Panchami (1972) as Goddess Parvati
- Jyotibacha Navas (1975)
- Zunj (1975) as Godabai
- Varat (1975)
- Shoora Mi Vandile (1975)
- Farrari (1976) as Shripat's Mother
- Bala Gau Kashi Angai (1977) as Madhuri's mother
- Hira Aur Patthar (1977)
- Chandra Hota Sakshila (1978)
- Suhaag (1979) as Jamnabai
- Kashino Dikro (1979)
- Patalin (1981) as Kirti's Mother

== Death ==
Vatsala Deshmukh died due to age-related complications on 12 March 2022, at the age of 92.

== See also ==
- Marathi cinema
