= Panihari =

- Starring: Shanta Apte
- Production company: Asiatic Pictures
- Release date: 1946
- Country: India
- Language: Hindi

Panihari is a Bollywood film. It was released in 1946.
