= Honaji Bala =

Marathi poet

- Born: Honaji Sayaji Shilarkhane; 1754; Saswad, Pune
- Died: 1844 (aged 89–90) near Pune
- Known for: Marathi Poetry

Honaji Sayaji Shilarkhane (1754–1844), known professionally as Honaji Bala, was a Marathi poet from Maharashtra, India. Honaji's compositions were sung by his friend Bala Karanjikar, and together the pair was known for their "Honaji Balacha Tamasha". He is known for contributions to the field of Lavani music and several classical Marathi song.

== Biography ==
Honaji was born into a Nandgawali family in Saswad and moved to Pune with his mother Vithabai. His father, uncle (Bala Bahiru), and grand father (Satappa) were also musicians (shahirs). He was a milkman by day and musician in the evenings as a part of entertainment troupe at the Peshwa residence.

Honaji was initially patronised by Sawai Madhavrao Peshwa with an honorarium of ₹300 per year. After Madhavrao's death, he was supported by the last Peshwa Baji Rao II. Later in career, he moved to Baroda where he received an annual sum of ₹200 from the Gaekwad prince.

Mutual enmity brought about his murder in a forest near Pune.

== Career ==
Honaji composed over 200 Lavani and Powadas. He contributed significantly for the development of Lavani music genre. He was the first to set Lavanis using classical Ragas and converted Tamashas into musical concerts.

Honaji's work often promoted female perspective in poetry, and with encouragement from Peshwa Baji Rao II, he composed Sringara lavanis. In his historical/mythological lavanis, Honaji followed the lyrical style of Shridhar Kavi and Mukteshwar, Eknath's grandson.

He introduced tabla in place of the traditional dholki. He also developed the baithakichi Lavani, a subgenre, which is presented by the singer in the seated position. He incorporated Tambori in his performances.

Honaji also wrote a few ballads but he was less successful in this regard.

== Media ==
The Marathi film, Amar Bhoopali, produced and directed by V. Shantaram in 1953 is based on the life of Honjai Bala. Panditrao Nagarkar played the role of Honaji Bala with Lalita Pawar and Sandhya in supporting roles. The screenplay was written by Vishram Bedekar.

A Marathi play titled Sangeet Honaji Bala starring Bhalchandra Pendharkar and Suresh Haldankar, first aired in 1954.

== Poems ==
- गोल तुझ्या शरीराचा Gol Tujhya Shariracha
- घडीघडी अरे मनमोहना Ghadi Ghadi Are Man
- घनश्याम सुंदरा श्रीधरा GhanShyam Sundara
- तुझ्या प्रीतीचे दु:ख मला Tujhya Preetiche Dukha
- तू पाक सूरत कामिना Tu Pak Surat Kamina
- नको दूर देशी जाऊ Nako Dur Deshi Jau
- लटपट लटपट तुझं चालणं Latpat Latpat Tujha Chalana
- सांगा मुकुंद कुणी हा Sanga Mukund Kuni Ha
- श्रीरंगा कमलाकांता Shriranga Kamalakanta
