= Duhai =

- Directed by: V.M. Vyas
- Produced by: Sunrise Pictures
- Starring: Ansari; Shanta Apte; Noor Jehan
- Cinematography: Dwarka Divecha
- Music by: Rafiq Ghaznavi; Pannalal Ghosh
- Release date: 1943
- Running time: 120 minutes
- Country: India
- Language: Hindi

Duhai (Curse) is a 1943 Indian Bollywood film. It was the sixth highest grossing Indian film of 1943.

== Cast ==
- Ansari
- Shanta Apte
- Noor Jehan
