= Sandhya Shantaram =

Indian film actress (1931–2025)

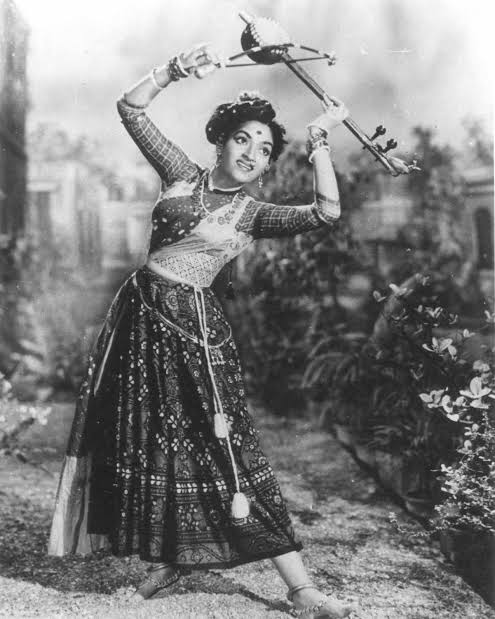
- Sandhya in 1957
- Born: Vijaya Deshmukh; 20 September 1931; Kochi, Kingdom of Cochin, India
- Died: 4 October 2025 (aged 94); Mumbai, Maharashtra, India
- Occupation: Actress
- Known for: Pinjra
- Spouse: V. Shantaram (m. 1956; died 1990)
- Relatives: Vatsala Deshmukh (sister)

Sandhya Shantaram (née Vijaya Deshmukh; 20 September 1931 – 4 October 2025), known mononymously as Sandhya, was an Indian actress. She is best known for her appearances in various Hindi and Marathi films directed by her husband V. Shantaram, in 1950s-1960s, most notably Jhanak Jhanak Payal Baaje (1955), Do Aankhen Barah Haath (1957), Navrang (1959), Marathi film Pinjra (1972) and Amar Bhoopali (1951).

== Early life and career ==
Sandhya was born on 20 September 1931. She was discovered by V. Shantaram when he was seeking new faces to cast for his film Amar Bhoopali (1951). What struck the filmmaker was that she had a good voice, one that strangely resembled that of his second wife, the actress Jayshree. She later married him after Jayshree left him. In 1952, Sandhya debuted as an actress in his Marathi film Amar Bhoopali in the role of a vocalist, the object of poet Honaji Bala's desire. She went on to feature in most of Shantaram's films. In her next film Teen Batti Char Raasta (1953), she played an impoverished girl named Kokila who is considered unattractive because of her dark skin, but who is secretly a radio star with a beautiful singing voice. Like her name, she resembled the black bird koel which sings beautifully. For the role, Sandhya wore dark makeup.

As she had no formal dance training, she underwent intensive instruction in classical dance from co-star Gopi Krishna for the film Jhanak Jhanak Payal Baaje. The two play Kathak dancers who are preparing for an important competition, but face opposition from their dance guru when they fall in love. The film was very successful and went on to win four Filmfare Awards as well as the National Film Award for Best Feature Film in Hindi. Sandhya starred opposite her husband in the film Do Aankhen Barah Haath, where she played Champa, a toy seller who fascinates the warden and inmates as she walks outside their jail. In Navrang, she played the plain wife of the titular character, a poet, who creates a fantasy image of her as his beautiful and sensuous muse. The film contained the Holi song "Arre Ja Re Hatt Natkhat", where Sandhya dances with an elephant wearing dancing bells ghungroo.

She next starred in Stree (1961), a film version of Shakuntala's story from the Mahabharata. As the epic mentions that Shakuntala and her son Bharata lived in the wilderness among lions, Shantaram decided to include real lions in some scenes. Sandhya did not have a double for these scenes; she prepared by shadowing a lion tamer and practicing in the cage with the lions. Sandhya's last major role was in the Marathi version of Pinjra; her character is that of a tamasha artiste who falls in love with a school teacher out to reform her, played by Shriram Lagoo in his film debut.

In 2009, she made a special appearance at the V. Shantaram Awards ceremony to commemorate the 50th anniversary of Navrang.

== Death ==
Sandhya died on 4 October 2025, at the age of 94 due to age related issues.

== Filmography ==
Year	Title	Role	Role	Ref.
1951	Amar Bhoopali	Gunawati	Marathi	
1952	Parchhain	Kishori	Hindi	
1953	Teen Batti Char Raasta	Shyama / Kokila	Hindi	
1955	Jhanak Jhanak Payal Baaje	Neela Devi	Hindi	
1957	Do Aankhen Barah Haath	Champa	Hindi	
1959	Navrang	Jamuna / Mohini	Hindi	
1961	Stree	Stree	Hindi	
1963	Sehra	Angara	Hindi	
1966	Ladki Sahyadri Ki	Rani Paigaonkar	Hindi; Marathi	
1971	Jal Bin Machhli Nritya Bin Bijli	Alaknanda Verma "Alka"	Hindi	
1972	Pinjara	Chandrakala Chandrawalkar	Marathi	
1975	Chandanachi Choli Ang Ang Jali	Gaura	Marathi	

== Awards ==
- Filmfare Award Marathi for Best Actress for Pinjara
- Filmfare Award Marathi for Best Actress for Chandanachi Choli Ang Ang Jali

== In popular culture ==
- In the 2018 Marathi biopic Ani... Dr. Kashinath Ghanekar, Amruta Khanvilkar paid homage to Sandhya's legacy by portraying her and recreating the iconic song "Tumhawar Keli Mi Marji Bahal" from Pinjara. The film is ranked as one of the highest grossing Marathi films of 2018.
