= Padosi =

- Directed by: V. Shantaram
- Written by: Vishram Bedekar
- Produced by: Prabhat Film Company
- Starring: Gajanan Jagirdar; Mazhar Khan; Radhakrishan; Anees Khatoon
- Cinematography: V. Avdhoot
- Music by: Master Krishnarao
- Production company: Prabhat Film Company
- Release date: 1941
- Running time: 135 minutes
- Country: India
- Languages: Marathi; Hindi

Shejari (Marathi version)

Padosi (Hindi version)

Shejari (Marathi: शेजारी) is also known as Padosi in Hindi version as (पड़ोसी, پڑوسی Neighbour). Padosi is a 1941 Indian social drama film directed by V. Shantaram. It was produced by Prabhat Film Company and the bilingual film in Marathi and Hindi was the last film Shantaram made for Prabhat before venturing to form his Rajkamal Kalamandir. The film is cited as one of the three social classics Shantaram made at Prabhat. The other two were Duniya Na Mane (1937) and Aadmi (1939). The story and dialogue were by Vishram Bedekar in the Marathi version, while the dialogues in the Hindi version were by Pandit Sudarshan, who also wrote the lyrics. The music director was Master Krishnarao. The famous character artist Radhakrishan made his acting debut in the film as a villain. The film starred Mazhar Khan, Gajanan Jagirdar, Anees Khatoon, Radha Kishan, Lajwanti, Sumitra, Gopal and Balak Ram.

The story concentrated on the topical issue of Hindu-Muslim unity, making a "strong plea" for it. The film was made against the backdrop of communal tension at the formation of the Muslim League. Shantaram attempted a theme showing amicable relations between the Hindus and the Muslims. To achieve a better geniality, he had Mazhar Khan, a Muslim playing a Hindu and Gajanan Jagirdar, a Hindu play the Muslim character.

With his trio of social films and especially Padosi, Shantaram has been cited by author Bajaj as the third best pre-1960 director in the top ten rating, following P. C. Barua for Devdas (1935) and Homi Wadia for Miss Frontier Mail (1936), followed by Mehboob Khan for Mother India (1957).

== Plot ==
The story is set in a small village in India where the villagers of different communities live in harmony. Pandit (Mazhar Khan) a Hindu, and Mirza (Gajanan Jagirdar) a Muslim, are two old friends who function as the village elders and look out for each other's families. An industrialist, Onkar, arrives to construct a dam in the village. He is opposed by the two friends and the other villagers. Onkar decides to create distrust and disunity between the two communities and friends. When a house is set on fire, Mirza is made to believe it is the work of Pandit and his son. Encouraged by the villagers, he is forced to ex-communicate the two. This causes strife and the dam is constructed. Finally the dam breaks and the two old friends come together again and die in their attempt to save lives.

== Cast ==
- Mazhar Khan as Thakur
- Gajanan Jagirdar as Mirza
- Anees Khatoon as Girija
- Radhakrishan as Jayaram
- Balwant Singh as Gokul
- D. D. Kashyap as Onkar
- Vasant Thengadi as Naim
- Lajwanti as Ameena
- Sumitra Devi as Munni
- Gopal as Sarju
- Balakram as Akbar
- Sarla Devi as Jodhi

== Crew ==
- Director: V. Shantaram
- Producer: Prabhat Film Company
- Music: Master Krishnarao Phulambrikar
- Lyricist: Pandit Sudarshan
- Cinematographer: V. Avadhoot
- Art Direction: S. Fattelal
- Sound Recordist: V. G. Damle
- Special effects: Prahlad Dutt
- Choreographer: Kali Bose
- Editor: A. R. Sheikh, Raja Nene

== Marathi Version ==
The Marathi version, Shejari, had essentially the same cast and crew. However, in the Marathi version, the role of the Pandit was played by Keshavrao Date, while Jagirdar played his original role of the Muslim friend, Mirza. The Marathi cast included Gajanan Jagirdar, Keshavrao Date, Chandrakant, Jayashree and Master Chhotu.

== Review And Box-office ==
The social and patriotic aspect of the film was stated to be a reason for its critical as well as commercial success as were Shantaram's other socially relevant films like Duniya Na Mane, Aadmi and Shakuntala. The film was known for its harsh criticism of the British Divide and Rule policy.

== Soundtrack ==
The music director was Master Krishnarao, who scored a ten-minute long song "Lakh Lakh Chanderi", featuring a dance scene which was highly commended. Vasant Desai was the assistant music director. The lyrics were written by Pandit Sudarshan and the singers were Krishnarao, Anees Khatoon, Balwant Singh, Balakram, Gopal and Mulia.

=== Song list ===
#	Title	Singer(s)
1	"Avadhapuri Sab Prem Hi Chhaava"	Mazhar Khan/Krishnarao
2	"Sathi Janam Maran Ka Tu"	Balwant Singh
3	"Kaka Abba Bade Khiladi"	Gopal, Balakram, Balwant Singh
4	"Ban Mein Bahar Aa Gayi"	Anees Khatoon, Balwant Singh
5	"Kaisa Chaya Hai Ujala Rasiya"	Anees Khatoon, Balwant Singh
6	"Mai Geet Sunati Rehti Hu"	Anees Khatoon
7	"Sari Duniya Musafir"	Balwant Singh, Anees Khatoon
8	"Uth Meri Pyari Beti"	Anees Khatoon
9	"Bharath Avadh Me Shok Manaye"	
10	"Mami Chail Chabili Naar"	
11	"Woh Din Bisar Hi Nahi More Raja"	Mulia
12	"Rama Bin Kachhu Nahin Suhave"	Mulia
