= Geeta (1940 film) =

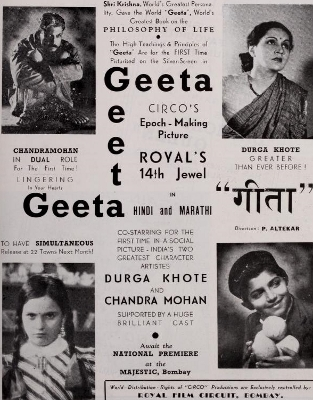
- Ad from Filmindia September 1940
- Directed by: Parshwanath Yeshwant Altekar
- Written by: Minoo Katrak
- Produced by: Circo Productions
- Starring: Chandra Mohan; Durga Khote; Anant Marathe
- Cinematography: Gordhanbhai Patel
- Edited by: Thete
- Music by: Datta Koregaonkar
- Release date: 1940
- Country: India
- Language: Hindi

Geeta is a Bollywood film directed by Parshwanath Yeshwant Altekar and starring Chandra Mohan, Durga Khote and Anant Marathe. It was released in 1940. The film produced under the Circo Productions banner was a bilingual made in Hindi and Marathi. The story was written by Minoo Katrak who in later films was to become a renowned sound recordist. The cinematographer was Gordhanbhai Patel and the film's music was composed by Datta Koregaonkar. It's dialogues and song lyrics were by S. K. Kallah with screenplay by Altekar. The rest of the cast included Trilok Kapoor, Ashalata, Vatsala Kumtekar and Baby Suman.

The film starred Durga Khote and Chandra Mohan in the same film for the second time. They had earlier acted in Amar Jyoti (1936) but not opposite each other. Chandra Mohan was cast in a double role in this film, playing the role of father and older son.

The story involves a restless man, whose hardships and needs make him leave his virtuous wife. Taking his young son Mohan along, he turns to a life of crime, inducing Mohan to become an outlaw with him.

== Plot ==
Shankar (Chandra Mohan) lives an unhappy existence with his pious wife Durga (Durga Khote), and son Mohan. Durga is a staunch believer of and clings rigidly to the teachings of Bhagavad Geeta. Shankar is irritated with his wife's devotional attendance on holy scripture, especially as the family is poor and things are not working out for him. One day, he takes his young son Mohan and leaves Durga behind. An expectant Durga, does not give up her beliefs and brings up the second child with good attributes and education. Shnkar now starts following a life of crime, in which Mohan joins him. Several years pass with Shankar and Mohan, now grown (Chandra Mohan again) continuing with their looting and killing. Shankar is caught in one of the killing sprees with the plotting of an opposite gang member and hanged. Mohan vows to take revenge on the gang for his father's death. He is soon caught and brought to court where his own younger brother Kumar (Trilok Kapoor) is the prosecutor. The mother meets her older son, and Mohan is finally repentant and looking for atonement.

== Cast ==
- Chandra Mohan as Shankar/Mohan
- Durga Khote as Durga
- Anant Marathe as Shankar's son
- Vatsala Kumtekar as Sundari, Mohan's prostitute girlfriend
- Ashalata as Lata, Sundari's sister wo is a devotee of Mohan's mother's teachings
- Trilok Kapoor as Kumar
- S. Nazir
- Baby Suman
- S. Prahlad
- Keki Bawa

== Review ==
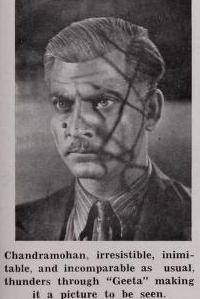
Chandra Mohan in Geeta (1940)

According to Baburao Patel in his review of the film in the November 1940 issue of Filmindia, he found the production to be of a poor standard, the direction weak, the songs "hopeless", and that bad editing tended to drag the picture. He praised the acting of Durga Khote "sparkling" and he found Chandra Mohan to be "Irresistible, inimitable and incomparable" and "he thunders through the picture like a giant,.... The man acts in his words. His very voice thrills with its well measured modulations tuned to the subtleties of the different situations". Anant Marathe as the young boy "must be mentioned with these big names. He is the only one who keeps good company with a confidence that suggests experience and courage."

== Soundtrack ==
The music composition was by Datta Koregaonkar with lyrics by S. K. Kallah. List:

=== Songlist ===
#	Title
1	"Dhaar Tej Pashemaani"
2	"Door Karo Door Karo Kachchra Door Karo"
3	"Koi Man Ki Been Bajaaye"
4	"Kyun Ghar Chhoda Baawre"
5	"Nainan Ke Teer Hoye Karejwa Mein Peed"
6	"Paap Katan Ko Vrat Lagaaye Karam Karaye Neecha"
7	"Prabhu Dekho Muskai"
8	"Prem Bina Yeh Jeevan Khaali"
9	"Sanwla Murliwla Yashoda Ne Paala"
10	"Sundar Sadi Phoolonwali Lata Odhkar"
