= Apna Ghar =

1942 film

- Directed by: Debaki Bose
- Produced by: Circo Productions
- Starring: Shanta Apte; Chandra Mohan; Mahesh Kaul; Vimala Vashishtha; Maruti
- Cinematography: Govardhan G. Patel
- Music by: Harishchandra Bali
- Distributed by: Circo Productions
- Release date: 28 February 1942
- Running time: 2 hour 36 minutes
- Country: India
- Languages: Hindi; Marathi

Apna Ghar is a Hindi-Marathi-language Bollywood film. It was released in 1942.

== Cast ==
List of cast include:

- Shanta Apte as Meera
- Chandra Mohan as Narendra
- Maya Banerjee as Manju
- Jeevan as Suresh
- Jagdish Sethi as Chowdhari
- Vimla Vashishth as Mami
- Maruti Rao as Gopal
- Vimal Sardesai as Indra
- Mahesh Kaul as Drona
- P.R. Joshi (Minor role as a fisherman)
- Nazir Bedi (Minor role as a Architecht)
- Kusum Deshpande
- Laxmi Nayampalli
- Madhukar Gupte

== Production ==
Apna Ghar was produced by Circo Productions. Debaki Bose directed the film.

== Release and Reception ==
Apna Ghar was released on 28 February 1942.
