= Rajput Ramani =

- Full film
- Directed by: Keshavrao Dhaiber
- Written by: Narayan Hari Apte, Narottam Vyas
- Starring: Nalini Tarkhad, Nanasaheb Phatak, Shanta Apte, Kelkar, Sureshbabu Mane, Budasaheb, Master Chhotu
- Cinematography: V. Avadhoot
- Music by: Composer: Keshavrao Bhole Lyricist: Narottam Vyas
- Production company: Prabhat Films
- Release date: 1936
- Country: India
- Language: Hindi

Rajput Ramani is a 1936 Hindi adventure movie directed by Keshavrao Dhaiber.

== Plot ==
The 1936 film Rajput Ramani is Prabhat's adventure movie set in a medieval Rajput court that addresses notions of Rajput chivalry.

The plot revolves around a powerful but widely disliked warrior, Mansingh (Nanasaheb Phatak), and a woman named Taramati (Nalini Tarkhad). The key plot points are: Mansingh is a legendary and strong warrior, but is hated by most people, including his own countrymen. Claiming to have been offended by Taramati, Mansingh insists to her eminent father that the only way to resolve the insult is through a marriage, on terms that are demeaning to Taramati.

Mansingh becomes a tyrant and imprisons many people, including Taramati's father. Eventually, Taramati's father leads a popular revolt from prison, threatening to kill his son-in-law, Mansingh.

The conflict is ultimately resolved only when Taramati decides to protect her husband, Mansingh. The film has a rare appearance of the Marathi stage legend, Nanasaheb Phatak. The film also features Shanta Apte in the role of Kesar, the heroine's sidekick.
