= Rajkamal Kalamandir =

Indian film company and studio

Rajkamal Kalamandir was a noted film production company and studio in Mumbai. It was established by V. Shantaram in 1942, after he left Prabhat Film Company. The studio produced films both in Hindi and Marathi, and it was best known for Dr. Kotnis Ki Amar Kahani (1946), Amar Bhoopali (1951), Jhanak Jhanak Payal Baaje (1955), Do Ankhen Barah Haath (1957), Navrang (1959) and Pinjara (1972). In its heyday, Rajkamal was one of the most sophisticated studios of the country.

As of 2019, the studio had spawned over 2,000 films.

== History ==
Prabhat Films was founded in Kolhapur, in 1929, towards the end of the silent films' era, by the V. Shantaram and V.G. Damle. The studio later shifted to Pune; here Shantaram directed notable films Amrit Manthan (1934) and Kunku (Duniya Na Mane, Hindi) in 1937. However, he parted ways in 1942, when bought the premises of Wadia Movietone in Mumbai. Wadia Movietone was established in 1933 by the Wadia brothers J. B. H. Wadia and Homi Wadia, who were most known for Hunterwali (1935). The studio released its debut feature film, Shakuntala in 1943, which was followed by films such as Dr. Kotnis Ki Amar Kahani (1946), Jhanak Jhanak Payal Baaje (1955), Do Aankhen Barah Haath (1957) and Navrang (1959), as well as Amar Bhoopali (1951) and Pinjra (1972) in Marathi.

== Filmography ==
- Shakuntala (1943)
- Parbat Pe Apna Dera (1944)
- Dr. Kotnis Ki Amar Kahani (1946)
- Lokshahir Ram Joshi (1947)
- Apna Desh (1949)
- Dahej (1950)
- Amar Bhoopali (1951)
- Parchhain (1952)
- Teen Batti Char Raasta (1953)
- Surang (1953)
- Subah Ka Tara (1954)
- Jhanak Jhanak Payal Baaje (1955)
- Toofan Aur Deeya (1956)
- Do Ankhen Barah Haath (1958)
- Navrang (1959)
- Stree (1961)
- Sehra (1963)
- Geet Gaya Patharon Ne (1964)
- Ladki Sahyadri Ki (1966)
- Boond Jo Ban Gayee Moti (1967)
- Jal Bin Machhli Nritya Bin Bijli (1971)
- Pinjra (1972)
- Jhanjhaar (1987)

== Bibliography ==
- Dwyer, Rachel (2005). 100 Bollywood Films. Roli Books. ISBN 978-81-7436-990-1.
- Gokulsing, K. Moti; Dissanayake, Wimal (2013). Routledge Handbook of Indian Cinemas. Routledge. ISBN 978-1-136-77284-9.
- Gulzar; Nihalani, Govind; Chatterjee, Saibal (2003). Encyclopaedia of Hindi Cinema. Popular Prakashan. ISBN 978-81-7991-066-5.
