= Dharmatma (1935 film) =

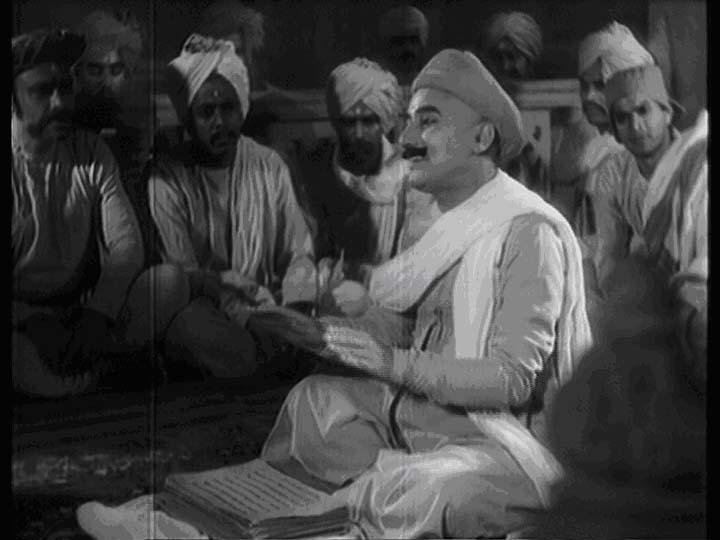
- Screen shot
- Directed by: V. Shantaram
- Written by: K. Narayan Kale
- Produced by: Prabhat Film Company
- Starring: Bal Gandharva; Chandra Mohan; Ratnaprabha; Vasanti
- Cinematography: Keshavrao Dhaiber
- Music by: Master Krishnarao
- Production company: Prabhat Film Company
- Release date: 1935
- Running time: 130 minutes
- Country: India
- Languages: Marathi; Hindi

Dharmatma

Dharmatma (The Holy Soul) is a 1935 Indian social devotional biopic directed by V. Shantaram. The film was a bilingual made in Marathi and Hindi. This was the only devotional film directed by Shantaram, though he had made several mythological films. The story and screenplay were by K. Narayan Kale and the music was composed by Master Krishnarao. The cast included Bal Gandharva in his debut role and Chandra Mohan as the villain, with Master Chhotu, K. Narayan Kale, Ratnaprabha, Vasanti and Hari Pandit.

The film is about the "legendary" Marathi religious poet and scholar Sant Eknath (1533–99), author of a variation of the Bhagavata Purana called Eknathi Bhagvata, numerous abhangs and the bharuda form of solo performances. The story revolves around his teachings regarding social injustices concerning untouchability, equality and humanity.

== Plot ==
Eknath (Bal Gandharva) concentrates on giving charitable and caring help to people especially those of the untouchable caste. This goes in variance against the vindictive Mahant (Chandra Mohan) who opposes such practices. Things come to a head when at a prayer meeting, Eknath feeds the untouchables first, before the Brahmins, as would be the normal custom. Eknath does not differentiate between castes and eats at their house too. This enrages the Mahant and he has Eknath ex-communicated. Eknath's son Hari Pandit (Kale) has joined the people and the Mahant who oppose his father's practices. Eknath finally arrives at Kashi and defends his behaviour by reciting verses of his poems to Pradayananda Shastri.

== Cast ==
- Bal Gandharva as Sant Eknath
- Chandra Mohan as Mahant
- Ratnaprabha
- Keshav Narayan Kale as Hari Pandit
- Master Chhotu as Shrikhandya
- Vasanti
- Kelkar
- Vasant Desai
- Budasaheb
- Rajni

== Production ==
Sant Eknath was the "only male role" enacted by Bal Ghandharva, who was a Marathi stage "legend". The film had a bigger budget allocated to it than Prabhat's Sant Tukaram (1936) made the following year. The original title Mahatma had to be changed due to the censors objection. Chandra Mohan's character was given a "nervous tic in one eye" to make him appear as an ordinary villain, and for expressionistic purposes Shantaram made use of "high-angle close-ups". Dharmatma was one of the only four films made on caste system around that period. The others were Chandidas (1932), Chandidas (1934), and to a lesser extent Achhut Kanya (1936) which had a "contemporary setting".

== Soundtrack ==
The music direction was by Master Krishnarao Phulambrikar, a classical musician who combined with another classicist Bal Gandharva in the film to create "a milestone in Indian cinema". The lyrics were by Narottam Vyas. There were sixteen songs in the film and the singers were Bal Gandharva, Vasant Desai, Ratnaprabha, Vasanti and Master Chhotu.

=== Songs ===
#	Title	Singer
1	"Aaj Bhaag Jaag Gaye Logo Hamare"	Vasant Desai
2	"Vharan Kamal Mein Prabhu Ke Maath Namaun Aaj"	Bal Gandharva
3	"Hai Boli Amrut Si Ma Ke Naam Ke Jaadu Se Sab"	Ratnaprabha
4	"Dhanya Dhanya Naaro Jaati"	Bal Gandharva
5	"Kaana Re Aa Zara Misri Maakhan Khaaye"	Vasanti
6	"Jan Pyare Sab Tumhe Ek Si Nazar Hai Din Nath Ki"	Ratnaprabha
7	"Kaise Bayan Karun Prabho Kya Kya Badhai Aapki"	Ratnaprabha
8	"Prabhu Sahare Ek Tumhi Ho Laaj Tumhare Haath Hai"	Bal Gandharva
9	"Prem Brij Bihari Prem Hai Pujari"	Bal Gandharva
10	"Rote Bure Na Hote"	Master Chhotu
11	"Narayan Nar Ke Rakhwar Kaun Bigaad Karega Tera"	Vasanti
12	"Sab Kehte Jisko Neecha"	Bal Gandharva
13	"Tan Ko Saaf Man Ko Saaf Kar Ke Hari Pyare"	Bal Gandharva
14	"Yadi Chaahi Bharat Ban Jaave Swarg Sukhon Ka"	Bal Gandharva
15	"Yeh Jag Ki Phulwari Prabhuji Nath"	Bal Gandharva
16	"Yeh Samta Barat Hamara Hai"	Ratnaprabha
