= Navrang =

- Film poster
- Directed by: V. Shantaram
- Screenplay by: V. Shantaram
- Story by: G. D. Madgulkar
- Starring: Mahipal; Sandhya
- Narrated by: V. Shantaram
- Cinematography: Tyagraj Pendharkar
- Edited by: Chintamani Borkar
- Music by: C. Ramchandra; Bharat Vyas (lyrics)
- Production company: Rajkamal Kalamandir
- Release date: 18 September 1959
- Country: India
- Language: Hindi
- Box office: ₹1.25 crore

Navrang is a 1959 Indian Hindi-language film co-written and directed by V. Shantaram. The film is noted for its dance sequences with lead actress Sandhya and music by C. Ramchandra, while playback singer Mahendra Kapoor made his singing debut with the song Aadha Hai Chandramaa Raat Aadhi.

== Plot ==
Diwakar is a poet, in British period India. He loves his wife Jamuna very much. But Jamuna feels that Diwakar is irresponsible and that he lives in a fantasy world. Meanwhile, Diwakar creates a muse from his imagination, who looks exactly like his wife and calls her Mohini. He becomes a recognized poet soon and Jamuna gives birth to a boy. However, happiness does not last a long time, as Diwakar loses his job because of his songs against the British rule. Now he can no longer feed his sickly father or his son. On top of all this, Diwakar's obsession with Mohini continues, which forces Jamuna to leave their home. Diwakar's father passes away one day.

Manjari, the courtesan sees Diwakar in a sad state on the road. She asks him the reason of his sadness. Diwakar narrates all his difficulties. She manages to call Diwakar's wife at Thakur's Birthday celebration through Thakur's mother. On the celebration day, Thakur orders Diwakar to sing. But Diwakar refuses saying that he is unable to write or sing anything as Jamuna, the inspiration is no longer with him. Thakur orders to arrest him. But remembering his wife and muse, Diwakar starts singing. Jamuna is actually sitting in the court, with Thakurain (Thakur's mother). Thakurain tells Jamuna that she is so lucky to have a husband who loves her so much. Jamuna recognizes Diwakar's talent and love for her. She realizes her mistake and patches up with her husband.

== Cast ==
- Sandhya as Jamuna/Mohini
- Mahipal as Divakar
- Keshavrao Date as Janardhan
- Chandrakant Mandare
- Baburao Pendharkar as Diwan Daulatrai
- Agha as Leelu Rangbaaz
- Vatsala Deshmukh
- Vandana Sawant
- Ulhas
- Jeetendra

== Music ==
Lyrics for all songs written by Bharat Vyas. The track "Aadha Hai Chandrama" is set to Raag Malkauns (Hindolam in Carnatic), and "Tu Chhupi Hai Kahan" in Raag Chandrakauns.

Song	Singer	Raga
"Aa Dil Se Dil Mila Le"	Asha Bhosle	Khamaj
"Tum Mere Main Teri"	Asha Bhosle	
"Tum Saiyan Gulab Ke"	Asha Bhosle	
"Rang De Re, Jeevan Ki Chunariya Rang De Re"	Asha Bhosle, Manna Dey	
"Tu Chhupi Hai Kahan, Main Tadapta Yahan"	Asha Bhosle, Manna Dey	Malkauns
"Aadha Hai Chandramaa, Raat Aadhi"	Asha Bhosle, Mahendra Kapoor	Malkauns
"Are Ja Re Hat Natkhat, Na Chhoo Re Mera Ghunghat"	Asha Bhosle, Mahendra Kapoor, Chorus	Pahadi
"Kaari Kaari Kaari Andhiyari Thi Raat, Ek Din Ki Baat"	Asha Bhosle, C. Ramchandra	
"Dono Ka Mel Na Milta Hai"	C. Ramchandra	
"Shyamal Shyamal Baran"	Mahendra Kapoor	Manj Khamaj
"Yeh Maati Sabhi Ki Kahani"	Mahendra Kapoor	
"Kaviraja Kavita Ke Mat Ab"	Bharat Vyas	

== Awards and nominations ==
Year	Category	Cast/Crew member	Status
Filmfare Award
1959	Best Editing	Chintaman Borkar	Won
1960	Best Sound	A. K. Parmar	Won
1960	Best Director	V. Shantaram	Nominated
