= Gopal Krishna (1938 film) =

- Poster
- Directed by: V. G. Damle; Sheikh Fattelal
- Written by: Shivram Vashikar
- Produced by: Prabhat Film Company
- Starring: Ram Marathe; Shanta Apte; Parshuram; Ganpatrao
- Cinematography: V. Avadhoot
- Music by: Master Krishnaro
- Production company: Prabhat Film Company
- Release date: 1938
- Running time: 132 min
- Country: India
- Languages: Marathi; Hindi

Gopal Krishna is a 1938 Marathi and Hindi mythological social film from Prabhat Film Company. The film was a remake of Prabhat Film Company's first silent film Gopal Krishna (1929). It was made in Marathi and Hindi simultaneously. The film was directed by Sheikh Fattelal and V. G. Damle and starred Ram Marathe, Shanta Apte, Parshuram, Prahlad, Ulhas and Ganpatrao. The story was written by Shivram Vashikar and the music was by Krishnarao.

Based on the young Lord Krishna, the story is less mythology and more about a social awareness for change. The film was made during the pre-independent India era when the resentment against British rule was high. The film makers metaphorically used the story of the boy Krishna and the cowherds against the oppressive King Kamsa, portraying the feelings of the Indians against the British mainly through dialogue.

== Plot ==
The story is based in Gokul where the young playful Krishna resides with his foster mother Yashodha and father Nanda. He tends cows along with other young cowherds. Gokul is ruled by the despotic King Kamsa who has Krishna's real parents in custody. He is intent on killing Krishna to prevent the prophecy of his death through Krishna coming true. Krishna incites the village people against Kamsa's oppressive regime. He prevents 500 cows being sent to Kamsa who demands that the people of Gokul do so. He battles Kamsa's General Keshi and defeats him when he is sent to kill him. The only miracle shown in the film is when Kamsa unleashes rain (unlike the other Puranic stories where the rain is brought about by the Rain God Indra) and Krishna lifts the Govardhan hill to shelter the people under it.

== Cast ==
- Ram Marathe as Krishna
- Shanta Apte as Radha
- Shankar as Anay
- Parsharam as Mansukh
- Prahlad as Kuns
- Ullhas as Keshi
- Manajirao as Nand
- Karunadevi as Yashoda

== Production ==
The sets for the filming were constructed in Poona where the Prabhat film Company was situated. The cows needed for the shoot were transported from Dombivili a suburb in Bombay to Poona by train. The cattle were allowed to roam freely on the sets.

== Soundtrack ==
Master Krishnarao was the music director and some of the songs are still popular today. The songs were sung by Hansa Apte, Ram Marathe and Parshuram and the lyricist was Pandit Anuj.

=== Songs ===
#	Title	Singer(s)
1	"Bachpan Ka Yaad Aaya"	Shanta Apte
2	"Nirdhan Ka Hai Tu Dhan"	Ram Marathe
3	"Kishan Pe Jaaun Waari"	Parshuram
4	"Gujariya De Dadhidaan"	Shanta Apte
5	"Maata Gau Hamaari Praanon Se Tu Hai Pyaari"	Chorus
6	"Banwaari Hai Aaya Gend Khelne"	Parshuram
7	"Sar Sar Sarwat"	Shanta Apte
8	"Naachta Jhoomta Jaaye Gokul"	Shanta Apte, Ram Marathe
9	"Graas Yeh Preet Ki Mod Ke Kha"	Shanta Apte
10	"Kanha Sab Ko Mohe"	Shanta Apte
11	"Tu Meri Maiya"	Ram Marathe
12	"Gokul Ke Veer Japo"	Parshuram
13	"Tum Brij Ke Dulare"	Parshuram
14	"Mod Mayi Yeh Kapil Gaay"	Shanta Apte
15	"Ratnon Jaisi Gaun Hamari"	Parshuram
