= G. R. Mane =

Indian actor

G.R. Mane was born in 1892 in Kolhapur, North-Western Provinces, British India. He was an actor, best known for his role in Gopal Krishna. He died in 1954 in India.
