= Amrit Manthan (film) =

- Directed by: V. Shantaram
- Written by: Narayan Hari Apte Veer Mohammed Puri
- Produced by: Prabhat Film Company
- Starring: Chandra Mohan; Nalini Tarkhad; Shanta Apte; G. R. Mane
- Cinematography: Keshavrao Dhaiber
- Music by: Keshavrao Bhole
- Production company: Prabhat Film Company
- Release date: 1934
- Running time: 155 min
- Country: India
- Languages: Hindi and Marathi

Amrit Manthan (English: Churning for nectar) is a 1934 Indian costume-drama film directed by V. Shantaram for his Prabhat Film Company. The film was produced simultaneously in Hindi and Marathi. The film starred Chandra Mohan, Nalini Tarkhad, Shanta Apte, G. R. Mane, Varde and Kelkar. The film was based on Narayan Hari Apte's novel Bhagyashree. The Hindi translation was done by Veer Mohammed Puri, who also wrote the lyrics for the film.

The narrative in ''Amrit Manthan'' focuses on a reformist king who bans the sacrifice of animals and humans in his kingdom.

The film was tremendously successful all over the country. It ran in one Bombay theatre for thirty weeks. Prabhat's distributor, Baburao Pai, coined the term "silver jubilee" when "Amrit Manthan" completed its twenty-fifth week: a first in the Indian film industry.

== Plot ==
The story is about a reformist king Kantivarma (Varde), who bans the sacrifice of animals and humans. This angers the fanatical Rajguru (Chandra Mohan), head priest of the Chandika cult. The cult meets secretly and the head priest orders the killing of the king. Yashodharma is chosen and though he hesitates, the priest orders him to do so. Yashodharma writes a note for his son before leaving that night, telling him of the deed planned by the Rajguru. After the King is killed, Yashodharma (Kulkarni) is betrayed by the Rajguru in court and is ordered to be killed. Yashodharma's two children, Madhavgupt (Mane) and Sumitra (Shanta Apte), are on the run, but Madhav is caught and the letter is found on him by one of Rajguru's men. Sumitra is taken prisoner and Rani Mohini (Nalin Tarkhad), who succeeds to the throne after her father's death is asked to have Madhav sacrificed in the temple by the Rajguru. There is a storm and Mohini and Madhav escape to the forest. Madhav later goes in search of his sister. Vishwasgupt (Kelkar), a trusted minister tells Mohini and the people of Avanti about Rajguru being the real killer. The temple is thronged by townspeople demanding justice and the Rajguru with his obsessive belief in sacrifices, offers himself to the goddess and cuts off his own head as a final sacrifice.

== Cast ==
The cast included:

- Nalini Tarkhad: Rani Mohini
- Shanta Apte: Sumitra
- G. R. Mane: Madhavgupt
- Sureshbabu Mane as Madhavgupta-- "Madhav"
- Chandra Mohan: High Priest
- Varde: Raja Krantivarma
- Kelkar: Vishwasgupt
- Kulkarni: Yashodharma
- Keshavrao Date: Rajguru
- Budasaheb: Lambhodar
- Umakant Desai: Ramsharan sentinel
- Y. Mane: Senapati

== Production ==
V. Shantaram having studied new techniques in film making in Germany, made use of them during the making of Amrit Manthan. He kept the camera at a low angle with a circular track movement and made effective use of light and shade, particularly at the start of the film when the cult meets. It was the first film to be produced at the Prabhat film company's new sound-proof studio and under the art direction of Fattelal, spectacular sets were put up. Through the film, V. Shantaram used "reformist tradition in Hinduism" to revoke the practice of sacrifices at festivals and prayers. V. Shantram, who had presented Durga Khote to films now introduced Chandra Mohan in his debut role as the High Priest in Amrit Manthan. Chandra Mohan went on to be counted as one of the top actors of the Indian screen.

The film was the first to have a run of twenty-five weeks (silver jubilee) at a theatre.

== Music ==
The music direction was by Keshavrao Bhole and lyrics were written by Veer Mohammed Puri. The first Hindi film ghazal "Kamsini Mein Dil Pe Gham Ka" was rendered in the film by Shanta Apte.

=== Songs ===
#	Title	Singer	Min
1	"Kamsini Main Dil Pe Gham"	Shanta Apte	3.10
2	"Raat Aai Hai"	Shanta Apte	3.06
3	"Dekho Dekho"	Shanta Apte	3.26
4	"Taro Mori Bipta'	Shanta Apte	2.50
5	"Arzoo-e-Dil Aayan Karne Se"		2.53
6	"Andheri Ab Beeti Saadho Vipada Ki Raat"		0.43
7	"Jayati Jai Ambike"		1.10
8	"Sakhi Ri Shyam"	Vasant Desai	3.07
9	"Soinri Pyash Bhagi"		3.19
10	"Aurat Ka Dukh Haro Devi Durga"		1.35
11	"Abla Hai Buri Bala"		1.15
12	"Banwa Ki Chhavi"		1.42
13	"Jiya Mora Na Bisaare"		1.48

== Reception ==
The film's strong political thrust provoked strong reactions among critics and viewers.
