= Amar Bhoopali =

1951 film

- Theatrical release poster
- Directed by: V. Shantaram
- Written by: Vishram Bedekar
- Produced by: V. Shantaram
- Starring: Panditrao Nagarkar; Sandhya; Lalita Pawar
- Cinematography: G. Balakrishna
- Music by: Vasant Desai
- Production company: Rajkamal Kalamandir
- Release date: 1951
- Country: India
- Language: Marathi

Amar Bhoopali (English: The Immortal Song, French: Le Chant Immortel) is a 1951 Indian Marathi language film, produced and directed by V. Shantaram and written by Vishram Bedekar. It is a true story about a simple cow herder who has an innate gift of poetry, set in the waning days of the Maratha confederacy, c. early 19th century. It is an ode to the saffron flag of Marathas, calling on people to rise again against the foreign enemy. It competed for the Grand Prize of the Festival at the 1952 Cannes Film Festival.

== Plot ==
Honaji Bala, a simple cow herder, becomes a legendary bard who has an innate gift of poetry. The film is set in the last days of the Maratha confederacy of the early 19th Century.

== Cast ==
In credits order translated from Marathi

- Panditrao Nagarkar as Shahir Honaji Bala
- Sandhya as Gunawati
- Lalita Pawar as Vitabai
- Bhalchandra Pendharkar as Bala Karanjikar
- Vishwas as Subedar
- Gulab as Suguna
- Jairampant as Shastribua
- Nimbalkar as Balakaka
- Amina as Jamuna
- Bandopant Sohoni as Ramji Sowcar
- M. George as Elfiston
- Stokes as Robinson
- Chandorkar as Valajimpat
- Kanse as Shiledar
- Shiv Kumar as Natya Porga (Boy Dancer)

== Music ==
The music for the film was composed by Vasant Desai, with lyrics penned by Shahir Honaji Bala. The soundtrack consists of twelve songs, featuring vocals by Panditrao Nagarkar, Lata Mangeshkar and Asha Bhosle. The song "Ghanashyama Sundara" is from this film.

=== Track listing ===
| No. | Title | Singer(s) | Length |
|---|---|---|---|
| 1. | "Ghanashyam Sundara Shridhara" | Panditrao Nagarkar, Lata Mangeshkar | 3:27 |
| 2. | "Tujya Preetiche Dukhh Mala Daau Nako Re" | Lata Mangeshkar | 3:25 |
| 3. | "Latpat Latpat Tujha Chaalan Ga" | Lata Mangeshkar | 3:18 |
| 4. | "Saanga Mukund Kuni Ha Paahila" | Panditrao Nagarkar, Asha Bhosle | 3:14 |
| 5. | "Ghadi ghadi are Manmohana" | Panditrao Nagarkar, Lata Mangeshkar | 4:25 |
| 6. | "Tujhi Majhi Preet" | Lata Mangeshkar | 2:36 |
| 7. | "Phadakato Bhagwa Zhenda Gaganaat (Part 1)" | Panditrao Nagarkar | 2:58 |
| 8. | "Nako Door Deshi Javoo" | Lata Mangeshkar | 3:01 |
| 9. | "Tu Pak Surat Kamina" | Panditrao Nagarkar | 2:54 |
| 10. | "Sundara Mhane Dilbara" | Panditrao Nagarkar, Asha Bhosle | 2:55 |
| 11. | "Phadakato Bhagwa Zhenda Gaganaat (Part 2)" | Panditrao Nagarkar | 2:48 |
| 12. | "Gol Tujya Shariracha" | Panditrao Nagarkar | 2:45 |

== Reception ==
=== Accolades ===
| Award | Category | Recipients and nominees | Outcome |
|---|---|---|---|
| Cannes Film Festival | Grand Prize of the Festival | V. Shantaram | Nominated |
| Cannes Film Festival | Vulcan Award - Technical Grand Prize for Direction | V. Shantaram | Won |

=== In popular culture ===
The 1980s advertisement for the Marathi newspaper Maharashtra Times used the song "Ghanashyam Sundara Shreedhara" as part of its jingle.

== See also ==
- Bhoopali
