= Vasantsena (1930 film) =

1930 Indian film

- Directed by: Mohan Bhavnani
- Based on: Mṛcchakatika by Shudraka
- Produced by: Mohan Bhavnani
- Starring: Enakshi Rama Rao; Kamaladevi Chattopadhyay; Nalini Tarkhad; Jaikishan Nanda
- Cinematography: K. V. Machwe
- Production company: Indian Art Productions
- Release date: 1930
- Country: India

Vasantsena, also known as Mricchakatik or The Toy Cart, was a 1930 Indian silent film directed by Mohan Bhavnani. Also produced by Bhavnani under the banner of Indian Art Productions, the film was an adaptation of Shudraka's Sanskrit-language play Mṛcchakatika.

The cast of Vasantsena included Enakshi Rama Rao, Kamaladevi Chattopadhyay, Nalini Tarkhad, and Jaikishan Nanda. According to film historian B. D. Garga, the participation of members of the educated classes as actors and actresses in Vasantsena helped break down prejudice against acting as a profession among educated Indians.

Vasantsena was filmed in South India, with K. V. Machwe serving as cinematographer and the regional temples being used as a backdrop for the drama. Released in 1930, it was the first Indian film to have Kannada-intertitles, according to the Encyclopaedia of Indian Cinema.

== Cast ==
- Enakshi Rama Rao
- Kamaladevi Chattopadhyay
- Nalini Tarkhad
- J. K. Nanda
- Bhardwaj
- Kailasa
- Shakuntala
