= Chandra Mohan (Hindi actor) =

Indian film actor (1906–1949)

Chandra Mohan Wattal
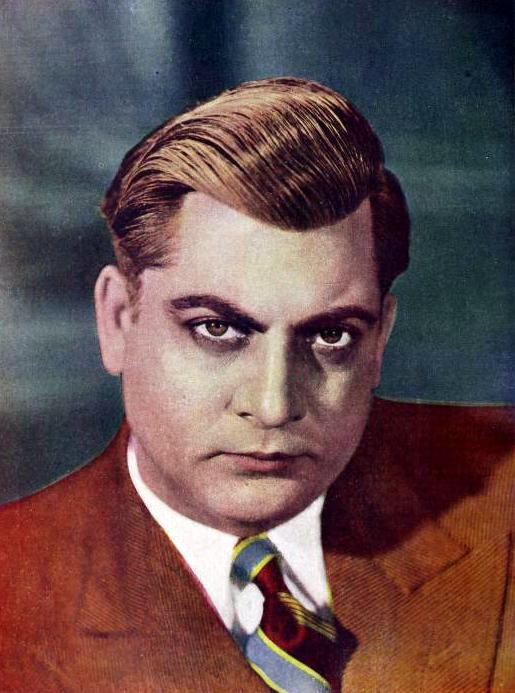
- Chandra Mohan from the publicity still of 'Roti' (1942)
- Born: 24 July 1906; Narsinghpur, Central Provinces, British India (present-day Madhya Pradesh, India)
- Died: 2 April 1949 (aged 42); Bombay, Province of Bombay, Dominion of India
- Occupation: Actor
- Years active: 1933–1949

Chandra Mohan (24 July 1906 – 2 April 1949) was an Indian actor, known for his work in Hindi cinema in the 1930s and 1940s. He became known for his villainous roles in a number of critical and commercial successes.

== Life and career ==
Chandra Mohan Wattal was born on 24 July 1906 at Narsinghpur, Madhya Pradesh. He belonged to a cultured family of Kashmiri Pundits. He lost his mother Roop Kishori Wattal (some sources cites her name as Brij Kishore Wattal) at a young age. His siblings included sisters Sushila Wattal (née Kak) and Leela Wattal and brother Manmohan Nath Wattal. Though his father Jagannath Sahai Wattal was a Kashmiri Pundit too, he was employed at Gwalior and hence, Chandra Mohan was brought up by his maternal grandmother, whose love and affection "spoiled" him a lot. Being disinterested in academics, he didn't even complete his schooling. Although pursuing acting as a career wasn't something he ever seriously thought of. His access to watching movies made him addicted to drinking, horse racing as well as reading. He had a good collection of Urdu books (written in Hindi script) as well as English books which helped him in acquiring a strong command over these languages. Post the death of his father, for a living, he used to pick up every petty odd job he was offered until one day, a film distributor from Delhi gave him a job. From the film distribution company, he was sent to Prabhat Film Company of Poona where he was noticed by one of its partners Syed Fateh Lal (some sources cites his name as Sheikh Fateh Lal). Impressed with Mohan's dynamic personality comprising his strong baritone, and particularly his large grey cat-like eyes, Fateh Lal would keep staring at his eyes for hours wondering how they would be received on the screen. Eventually, Fateh Lal decided to launch Mohan in films. As a result, his eyes form the opening sequence in V. Shantaram's 1934 film Amrit Manthan, which was also his film debut. It was the first film made in the newly established Prabhat Films studio, and made both in Hindi and Marathi. The frequent closeups of his eyes throughout the film made him an overnight sensation, resulting in Mohan receiving acclaim for his role as Rajguru and thereby, went on to establish himself as a noted villain of the time.

Mohan later appeared as Emperor Jehangir in Sohrab Modi's Pukar, as Randhir Singh in Mehboob Khan's Humayun and as Seth Lakshmidas, in Mehboob Khan's Roti. Besides Hindi, he was fluent in Marathi and did 3-4 Marathi films too. Barring his first two bilingual films namely Amrit Manthan and Dharmatma which were made in both Hindi and Marathi, the two other bilingual films (Hindi and Marathi) he did were Geete and Aaple Ghar in Marathi which were remade in Hindi as Geeta and Apna Ghar respectively. In Apna Ghar, he used minimal use of dialogues and maximum use of gestures of his eyes and left his mark in a memorable role of a cruel husband. His earning for the year 1940 was Rs. 45,000.

One of his last appearances was in Ramesh Saigal's 1948 film Shaheed. As Rai Bahadur Dwarkadas, he played father to Ram, who was portrayed by Dilip Kumar. Mohan's character in this film initially supports the British Government but later favors the Freedom Struggle. Chandra Mohan's last movie was a religious movie Rambaan (1948), in which he played the role of the demon emperor Ravana.

He was the original choice to play Emperor Akbar in K. Asif's Mughal-e-Azam, but due to his untimely death the film had to be reshot after ten reels were shot with him as lead. The film was eventually released in 1960.

== Personal Life and Death ==
Chandra Mohan liked to help needy people discreetly. He was fond of buying race horses, betting and best quality scotch whisky. Motilal, with whom he had shared screen, had similar interests which made them close friends. His other horse-riding friends included, besides Motilal, the Maharaja of Kashmir Hari Singh and of Gwalior Jeewajirao Scindia. Chandra Mohan's telephone number was 26333. He had a cook named Mohammed and a secretary Patel. Amongst his closest friends from the industry included Motilal, K. L. Saigal, K. N. Singh, M. Kumar, Prem Adib, Ulhas and Rajan Haksar. He often used to have drinks and treats with them, all the expense being borne by him. Known for his extravagant lifestyle, his financial condition kept worsening day by day. Despite that, Mohan kept fulfilling his luxury desires which included gambling and drinking heavily as a result of which, towards the end of his life, he had to sell his household possessions for money. An unmarried man, Mohan was looked after by a companion named Sheila James. Around March 1949, his health started detoriating steadily. Following an illness of 15 days, he realized he would die soon. On April 2 1949 (Saturday), he requested Sheila James to call upon Motilal and M. Kumar to him on his deathbed. Soon, at 10:15 a.m., Chandra Mohan passed away from a heart attack at a untimely age of 42 at his residence,16, Bikha House (now called Ram Mahal), Churchgate, Bombay (now Mumbai). Apart from Motilal, M. Kumar and Sheila James, no one was present at the time of his death, not even his siblings. Leonine in bearing and noble in character, Chandra Mohan was recognized for being a great actor, a great sportsman and a friend to whom all rushed in their hour of need.

== Partial Filmography ==
Year	Film	Role	Notes
1934	Amrit Manthan	Rajguru	Debut film; mostly the closeup of his large, grey cat-like eyes were taken; bilingual film (Marathi and Hindi)
1935	Dharmatma	Mahant	Bilingual film (Marathi and Hindi)
1936	Amar Jyoti	Durjaya	
1937	Wahan : Beyond the Horizon	Kodandvarma	
1938	Jwala		
1939	Pukar	Emperor Jahangir	
1940	Bharosa	Rasik	
1940	Geete (Marathi) and Geeta (Hindi)	Shankar (father) and Mohan (son)	Double role; Bilingual film
1942	Aaple Ghar (Marathi) and Apna Ghar (Hindi)	Narendra	Bilingual film
1942	Roti	Lakshmidas	
1943	Fashion		
1943	Naukar	Fazlu	
1943	Shakuntala	King Dushyanta	
1943	Taqdeer	Judge Jumnaprasad	
1944	Draupadi		
1944	Mumtaz Mahal	Emperor Shah Jahan	
1944	Raunaq		
1945	Humayun	Randhir Singh	
1945	Ramayani		
1946	Shalimar		
1948	Shaheed	Rai Bahadur Dwarkadas	
1948	Rambaan	Ravana	Final film
