= Udaykal =

1930 film

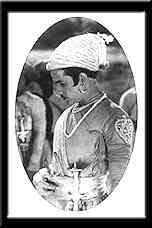
- Screen shot from Udaykal
- Directed by: V. Shantaram
- Written by: Baburao Pendharkar
- Produced by: Prabhat Film Company
- Starring: V. Shantaram; Kamala Devi; Baburao Pendharkar; G. R. Mane
- Cinematography: S. Fattelal; V. G. Damle
- Production company: Prabhat Film Company
- Release date: 1930
- Country: India
- Languages: Silent Film; Marathi intertitles

Udaykal (Thunder Of The Hills) is a 1930 historical silent film co-directed by V. Shantaram and Keshavrao Dhaiber. It was produced by Prabhat Film Company. The story was written by Baburao Pendharkar. The cinematographers were S. Fattelal and V. G. Damle. The film starred V. Shantaram, Baburao Pendharkar, Kamla Devi, G. R. Mane, Ibrahim and Dhaiber.

The film was the second of two "significant historical silent films" made by Shantaram, the first being Netaji Palkar (1927). Udaykal was a historical film based on the "military expeditions" of the young 17th century Maratha Emperor Shivaji.

== Cast ==
- V. Shantaram
- Baburao Pendharkar
- Kamla Devi
- G. R. Mane
- Ibrahim
- Keshavrao Dhaiber
- Anant Apte
- Rahim Miya
- Yaghya the Dog

== Production ==
Shantaram stated that this was the first film which "politicised" the Maratha Emperor Shivaji. The film was earlier called "Swarajyacha Toran" (The Flags Of Freedom), but with the censors opposing the word "Freedom", which to them seemed "seditious" in the title, its name was changed to Udaykal. The censors had the producers make several other changes just prior to the release, one of them being the climactic hoisting of the "saffron flag" at Sinhagad Fort.
