= Ramchandra Purushottam Marathe =

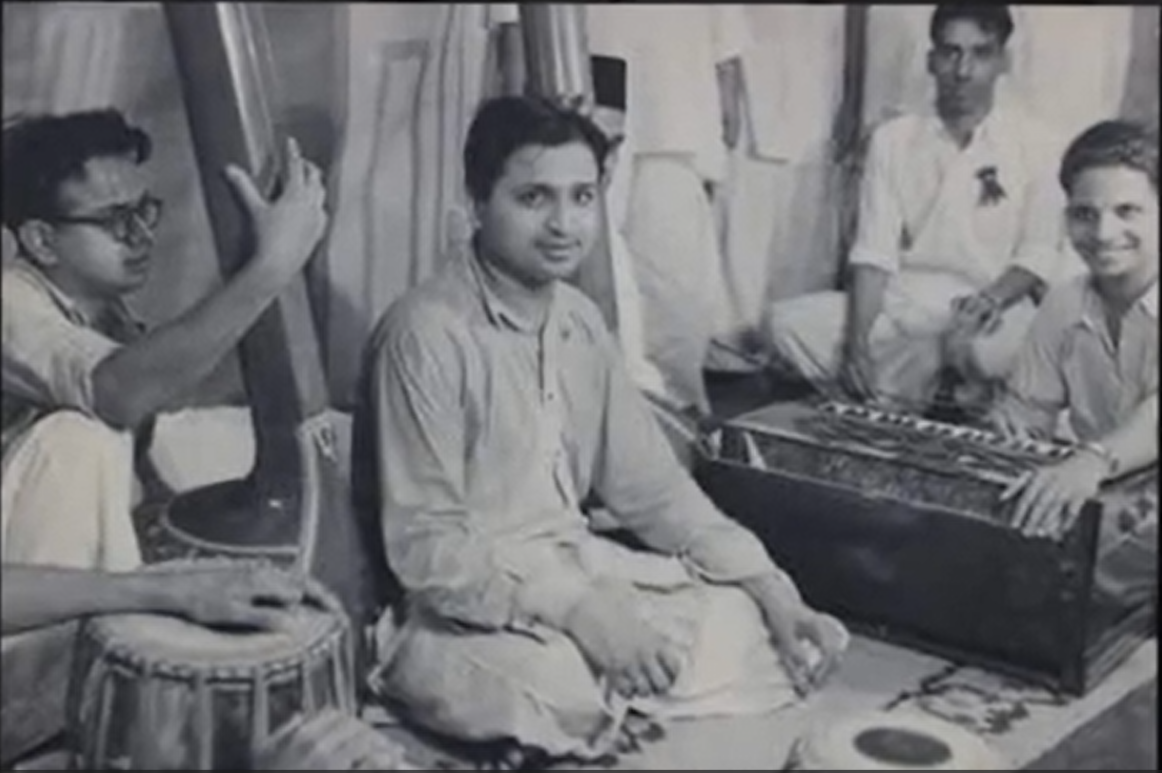
- Born: 23 October 1924; Pune, Maharashtra, India
- Died: 4 October 1989 (aged 64); Thane, Maharashtra, India
- Other names: Ram Marathe, Pandit Ram Marathe
- Known for: Marathi music, Hindustani classical music, Sangeet Natak

Ramchandra Purushottam Marathe (23 October 1924 – 4 October 1989), also known as Pandit Ram Marathe, was a Marathi music director, singer, and actor on stage and in films. As a child actor, he performed the title role of Krishna in Prabhat Film Company's 1938 film, Gopal Krishna. He was disciple of Vilayat Hussain Khan, the maestro of Agra gharana of Hindustani classical music., Master Krishnarao Phulambrikar and others. Through Master krishnarao, he developed his Khayal style which had elements of different gharanas such as Jaipur, Gwalior and Agra.

== Early life and education ==
Pandit Ram Marathe was born on 23 October 1924 at Pune and done his schooling at Bhave School. He trained in classical music under several masters including Pandit Manohar Barve of Gwalior Gharana, Pandit Mirashibuwa of Gwalior Gharana, Master Krishnarao Phulambrikar, Pandit Wamanrao Sadolikar & Mogubai Kurdikar of Jaipur Gharana, Khan Saheb Vilayat Hussein Khan of Agra Gharana, Pandit Jagannath Buwa Purohit. Also he had tabla training from Pt. Balubhaiyya Rukdikar, Pt. Jagannath Buwa Purohit & Ustad Ahmadjaan Thirkhawa.

== Career ==
He joined Sagar Film Company in 1933 and acted in Mehboob Films like “Manmohan”, “Jagirdar” and “Vatan”. Subsequently he joined Prabhat Film Company in 1935 & acted in “Gopalkrishnan” under the direction of Shri V. Shantaram. He was with Prabhat till 1940 and acted in number of Prabhat films notably “Admi” (Hindi) and “Manus” (Marathi). He acted as child prodigee/actor in more than 16 films.

He had performed in all the musical festivals at various places like Jalandhar, Patna, Lahore, Delhi, Gwalior, Calcutta, Banaras, Amritsar and almost all over the Maharashtra.

He started his stage career under the perusal of Natvarya Shri Ganapatrao Bodas in 1950 as a leading character in old classical musical dramas like Saubhadra, Sanshayakallol, Swayamvar, Ekach Pyala, Manapman etc. with veteran actor and actress such as Balgandharva, Hirabai Badodekar, Vinayakbuwa Patwardhan, Nanasaheb Phatak.

== Awards and recognitions ==
- Maharashtra Natya parishad honoured the “Sangeet Bhushan” degree in 1961.
- Gold Medal by “Marathi Natya Parishad” at Balgandharva Anniversary in 1973.
- Recognition by Government of Maharashtra in 1981 for successful completion and continuous 30 years of career in Marathi Sangeet Rangbhumi.
- Received “Sangeet Natak Academy” Award in New Delhi for Marathi stage music (Natyasangeet) in 1988 from Honorable President of India Shri Venkatraman.

Appointed by AIR, New Delhi on Northan (Hindustani) Music Audition Board Committee. Also Advisory Nagpur and other Universities in India.
