= Jal Bin Machhli Nritya Bin Bijli =

- Poster
- Directed by: V. Shantaram
- Produced by: V. Shantaram Productions
- Starring: Sandhya; Abhijeet
- Music by: Laxmikant–Pyarelal
- Release date: 27 January 1971
- Country: India
- Language: Hindi

Jal Bin Machhli Nritya Bin Bijli (transl. Fish without Water, Lightning without Dance) is a 1971 Bollywood romance film directed by V. Shantaram, with Sandhya and Abhijeet as leads, along with Vatsala Deshmukh and Dina Pathak.

This was the first Indian film for which all songs were recorded in stereophonic sound. The film, however, had mono soundtrack. All songs were recorded and mixed by Mangesh Desai at V. Shantaram's Rajkamal Kalamandir studios.

== Plot ==
Alaknanda lives a wealthy lifestyle with her widowed dad, Dr. Verma. She is fond of dancing and singing to such an extent that she refuses to marry the groom her dad has chosen for, runs away to Laitpur, enlists in the song and dance troupe that Rajkumar Kailash runs in his palatial house called "Lalit Mahal". Both Kailash and Alaknanda meet and fall in love, but Kailash's mom wants him to marry Rajkumari Rupmati. Then, when Alaknanda is performing, she meets with an accident and is hospitalized with a fractured leg that may never heal. Afraid to show her face to Kailash, who still insists on marrying her, she uses her crutches to escape from the hospital, ends up with a gang of bandits, is rescued by Kailash and brought home - where circumstances will again put her on the stage to perform a dance. The question remains how can a cripple perform a dance?

== Cast ==
- Abhijeet as Rajkumar Kailash - Abhijeet was screen name given by V Shantaram but his Real Name is Prem Sagar Gosain.
- Sandhya as Alaknanda 'Alka' Verma
- Vatsala Deshmukh as Bhairavi
- Iftekhar as Dr. Verma
- Raja Paranjpe as Chamay 'Royal' Roy
- Birbal as Masseur
- Vasant Parekh
- Ravindra
- Dina Pathak as Rajmata (as Dina Gandhi)
- Sushant Ray as Bandit child

== Soundtrack ==
The music of this movie was composed by Laxmikant–Pyarelal. Lyricist Majrooh Sultanpuri

| # | Title | Singer(s) | Raga |
|---|---|---|---|
| 1 | "Taron Mein Sajke Apne Suraj Se" | Mukesh | |
| 2 | "Baat Hai Ek Boond Si" | Lata Mangeshkar, Mukesh | |
| 3 | "Kajra Laga Ke" | Lata Mangeshkar | Yaman Kalyan |
| 4 | "Jal Bin Machhli" | Lata Mangeshkar | |
| 5 | "Jo Main Chali, Phir Na Miloongi" | Lata Mangeshkar | |
| 6 | "O Mitwa" | Lata Mangeshkar | |
| 7 | "Jhoom Ke Gaa Ae Dil" | Lata Mangeshkar, Mukesh | |
| 8 | "Ek Toh Jawani Ke Din Char" | Lata Mangeshkar | |
