= Netaji Palkar (film) =

1927 film

- Directed by: V. Shantaram
- Produced by: Prabhat Film Company
- Starring: Balasaheb Yadav; Anasuya; Zunzharrao Pawar; Mane
- Cinematography: S. Fattelal
- Production company: Prabhat Film Company
- Release date: 1927
- Country: India
- Languages: Silent Film; Marathi intertitles

Netaji Palkar is a 1927 Indian biopic historical silent film directed by V. Shantaram. Kaishavrao Dhaiber who was an apprentice with Damle, co-directed the film. He was to become the chief cinematographer for Shantaram in his later films. Made under the Maharashtra Film Company, Kolhapur, it was the first film directed by Shantaram. The director of photography was S. Fattelal and the cast included Ansuya, Balasaheb Yadav, Ganpat Bakre and Zunzarrao Pawar.

The film, based on the Maratha King Shivaji's Senapati (Commander-in-Chief) Netaji Palkar, and his struggle to save his kingdom, is cited to have made a great "impact" on Marathi Cinema. According to Garga, the commercial success of the film helped save the Maharashtra Film Company from facing bankruptcy.

== Cast ==
- Balasaheb Yadav
- Sushila Devi
- Zunzharrao Pawar
- Anasuya
- Ganpat Bakre
- Mane
- Gulabbai
- Vasantrao Deshpande
