= Gopal Krishna (1929 film) =

1929 film

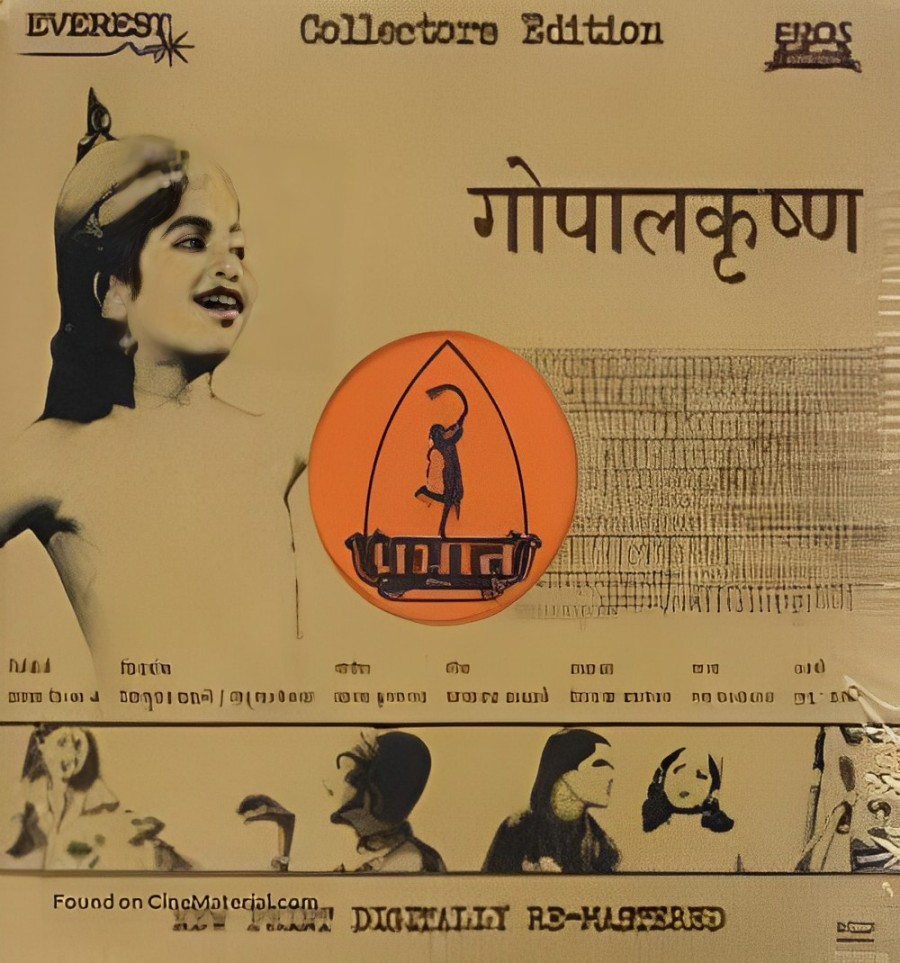
- Directed by: V. Shantaram
- Written by: Shivram Vashikar
- Produced by: Prabhat Film Company
- Starring: Suresh; Kamala Devi; Anant Apte; G. R. Mane
- Cinematography: S. Fattelal
- Production company: Prabhat Film Company
- Release date: 1929
- Country: India
- Languages: Silent film Marathi intertitles

Gopal Krishna (Child Krishna) is an Indian religious silent film made in 1929. It was directed by V. Shantaram for his newly formed Prabhat Film Company. The film was a "solo debut" for Shantaram, after co-directing Netaji Palkar (1927) with K. Dhaiber for the Maharashtra Film Company. The story was written by Shivram Vashikar and the cast composed of Suresh, Kamaladevi, Anant Apte, Sakribai and G.R. Mane.

The story was about the child (Gopal) Krishna and his fight with King Kamsa of Mathura. Made in the Pre-Independence era, the film was cited as representing the "Gandhian anti-colonial nationalism". Shantaram stated that he had meshed the Puranic story with "topical allusions". The film was a success as was remade as the talkie Gopal Krishna (1938).

== Cast ==
- Suresh
- Kamaladevi
- Anant Apte
- Sakribai
- G. R. Mane
