= Shanta Apte =

Indian actress, singer

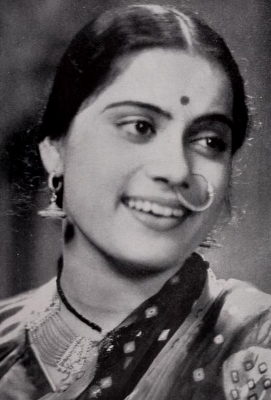
- Shanta in Gopal Krishna (1938)
- Born: Shanta Apte; 1916; Dudhni, Maharashtra, British India
- Died: 1964 (aged 47–48); Andheri, Bombay, Maharashtra, India
- Occupation: Singer-actress
- Years active: 1932–1958

Shanta Apte (1916–1964) was an Indian actress-singer who worked in Marathi and Hindi cinema. Renowned for her roles in films like Duniya Na Mane/Kunku (1937) and Amar Jyoti (1936) under the Prabhat Films banner, she was active in Indian cinema from 1932 to 1958. Apte's impact on Marathi cinema "paralleled" that of Kanan Devi in Bengali cinema. Along with Kanan Devi, Apte is cited as one of the "great singing stars" from before the playback singing era. Apte began her career in films playing the role of a young Radha in the Marathi film Shyamsunder (1932). She joined Prabhat Films acting in her first Hindi language film Amrit Manthan in (1934).

She brought a change in the static style of song renditions in films with her "spontaneous gestures and eye movements". In 1939, she staged a hunger strike at the Prabhat Studios gate to argue for more frequent work. Cited as a "domestic guerrilla" following her roles in films like Kunku/Duniya Na Mane, she became an inspirational role-model for a generation of college students.

Claimed to be the highest paid female screen star in Marathi-language cinema, her "star" status with the audiences as early as 1937 was acknowledged by the cine-magazine editor Baburao Patel in the December 1937 issue of Filmindia, in an editorial titled "India Has No Star".

She was also one of the earliest Indian cinema actors to write her autobiography, Jau Mi Cinemat (Should I join Films), in Marathi.

== Early years ==
Born in 1916 in Dudhni, Maharashtra, British India, into a Maharashtrian Brahmin family, Apte was the daughter of a station master. Following her father's inclination towards singing, the young Apte took up it up, rendering bhajans at the local Ganesh festivals in Poona. She studied music at the Maharashtra Sangeet Vidyalaya in Pandharpur.

She was introduced in films as a child artist at the age of nine years, by the actor-director Baburao Pendharkar. The "guidance" of her older brother Baburao Apte, who acted in Apte's first film Shyamsunder as Radha's husband, was stated to be a help in her rise to stardom.

== Career ==
=== 1930s ===
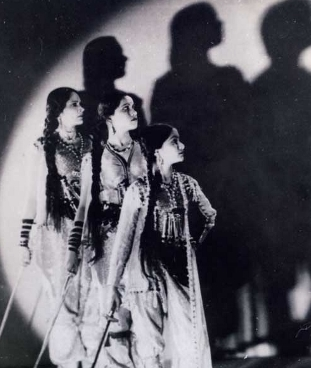
Durga Khote, Shanta Apte and Vasanti in Amar Jyoti (1936)

Apte started her acting career when she was discovered at the age of nine years by Baburao Pendharkar and then cast in the Bhalji Pendharkar-directed film Shyamsunder. The film is stated to be the first Marathi film to celebrate a "silver jubilee" (25 weeks) in a single theatre.

In 1934, she was cast as the hero's sister in Amrit Manthan, directed by V. Shantaram for Prabhat Films. The film was a "box-office bonanza" and a big break for Apte. It was the first Hindi talkie film to celebrate a silver jubilee and was screened at International Film Festival, Venice. The film was the first to have a run of 25 weeks (silver jubilee) at a theatre. Apte rendered four solo songs under the music direction of Keshavrao Bhole, including the first recorded filmi ghazal, "Kamsini Mein Dil Pe Gham Ka".

1936 saw Apte acting in the V. Shantaram-directed Amar Jyoti. It co-starred Durga Khote, Vasanti and Chandra Mohan and was Prabhat Film banner's first film to have playback singing.

In 1937, she acted in V. Shantaram's Duniya Na Mane, also called The Unexpected, where she played the role of a young girl, Nirmala, who is married to a rich old widower, played by Keshavrao Date. She protests and refuses to acknowledge him as her husband. In the end, the old man realises what he's done and commits suicide, leaving a note where he asks Nirmala to remarry. Shanta sang an English song in the film, a version of Henry Wadsworth Longfellow's Psalm of Life. The same year, she acted in the Marathi version of the film called Kunku. The film proved to be the biggest success of her career and is still acclaimed by critics.

In 1938, Apte acted in another famous film from Prabhat Films, directed by V. Shantaram, called Gopal Krishan.

=== 1940s ===
Shanta Apte in a still from Duhai (1943)

In 1941, Apte acted in Savithri, a Tamil film, which also had M. S. Subbalakshmi playing the role of Narad. Apte acted with Noor Jehan in Duhai (Curse) in 1943, a social melodrama where Noor Jehan played the second lead. The film was directed by Vishnu Vyas, it had music by Rafiq Ghaznavi and Pannalal Ghosh.

In 1946, Apte acted in four films with Subhadra being a "mythological comedy", which was produced and directed by Master Vinayak and co-starred Yakub, Ishwarlal and Lata Mangeshkar. Subhadra had Apte and Lata Mangeshkar singing together in the song "Main Khili Khili Phulwari", under the music direction of Vasant Desai. Then came Uttara Abhimanyu, directed by Sarvottam Badami for Paras Pics and co-starring Shahu Modak; Panihari directed by V. M. Gunjal starred Surendra and Yakub; and Valmiki, directed by Bhalji Pendharkar, with both Prithviraj and Raj Kapoor acting in the film.

Shanta Apte thus had the rare distinction of singing and acting with the three "iconic female singers" of Indian cinema: with M. S. Subbulakshmi in Savithri (1941), with Noor Jehan in Duhai (1943) and with Lata Mangeshkar in Subhadra (1946).

=== 1950s ===
The 1950s saw fewer films from Shanta Apte. She acted in Marathi films like Raja Paranjpe's Jara Japoon (Be Careful) in 1950, with Keshavrao Date and Leela Chitnis, Kunkvacha Dhani (1951), directed by Datta Dharamadhikari, Tai Teleen (1953), directed by K. P. Bhave, and Mulu Manek (1955), directed by Manhar Raskapur.

Her last two films were in Hindi, Chandi Puja starring Nirupa Roy, Manhar Desai and Prem Adib and directed by Raman B. Desai, and the last released film Ram Bhakta Vibhishan in 1958, directed by Samar Chatterjee, with the same star cast as Chandi Puja.

== Personal life ==
Apte has been referred to as a woman who "symbolized women power both on and off the screen". According to K. A. Abbas, commenting on the vitriolic writings of the cine-magazine editor Baburao Patel of Filmindia, "there was only one example of a spirited star like Shanta Apte taking the law in our own hands when she came to Baburao's office and hit him with a cane…". She defied her contractual agreement with Prabhat Films when it hampered her from acting in outside films and decided to stage a fast in front of the studio gates. She was released from her contract by Prabhat Films.

Ten years after Shanta Apte's death, actress Nayana Apte declared herself to be her daughter. Nayana claimed Apte married a distant cousin in 1947 and left him when she was three months pregnant. According to Vijay Ranchan in his book "Story of a Bollywood Song", in the section on Shanta Apte titled "The Rebel Commoner", Shanta was unmarried, but had a daughter, the Marathi cinema and stage actress, Nayana Apte.

== Death ==
Apte died of a heart attack following a six-month illness, on 24 February 1964, at her residence in Andheri, Mumbai, Maharashtra.

== Filmography ==
List of films:

- Shyam Sundar (1932)
- Amrit Manthan (1934)
- Amar Jyoti (1936)
- Rajput Ramani (1936)
- Duniya Na Mane/Kunku (1937)
- Wahan (1937)
- Gopal Krishna (1938)
- Savithri (1941) Tamil
- Apna Ghar/ Aple Ghar (1942)
- Zamindar (1942)
- Duhai (1943)
- Mohabbat (1943)
- Bhagya Lakshmi (1944)
- Kadambari (1944)
- Sawan (1945)
- Panihari (1946)
- Subhadra (1946)
- Uttara Abhimanyu (1946)
- Valmiki (1946)
- Mandir (1948)
- Bhagyarekha (1948)
- Main Abla Nahin Hoon ((1949)
- Swayamsiddha (1949)
- Jaga Bhadyane Dene Aahe (1949) (Marathi)
- Shilanganache Sone (1949) (Marathi)
- Jara Japoon (1950) (Marathi)
- Kunkvacha Dhani (1951) (Marathi)
- Tai Teleen (1953) (Marathi)
- Mulu Manek (1955) (Gujarati)
- Chandi Puja (1957)
- Ram Bhakta Vibhishan (1958)
