= Das Baje =

- Ad in Filmindia May 1942
- Directed by: Raja Nene
- Written by: Kashyap; Pawar
- Produced by: Prabhat Film Company
- Starring: Paresh Bannerjee; Vasant Thengadi; Urmila
- Cinematography: E. Mohammed
- Music by: Keshavrao Bhole
- Release date: 1942
- Running time: 144 minutes
- Country: India
- Languages: Hindi; Marathi

Das Baje, also called 10 O'Clock, is an Indian film. It was released in 1942. This was a debut direction for Raja Nene, a protege of V. Shantaram, and produced under Shantaram's Prabhat Film Company banner. The film was a bilingual, made in Hindi, and in the Marathi language as Daha Wajta. The music direction was by Keshavrao Bhole. The story was written by Kashyap and Pawar, with dialogues in Hindi by Ashant. The photography was by E. Mohammed. It starred Paresh Bannerji, Urmila and Vasant Thengdi in the lead roles, with Baby Shakuntala and Manajirao forming the supporting cast.

The story is a love triangle, which starts with a college romance between Asha and Dilip. Dr. Ramesh is also in love with Asha and her father's choice as her future husband. He faces a medical ethics dilemma when he has to operate on Dilip.

== Plot ==
Asha (Urmila) and Dilip (Paresh Bannerji) study together in college and are in love with each other. While Urmila comes from a wealthy family, Dilip is poor but academically brilliant. His family consists of a young eight-year-old sister (Baby Shakuntala), whom he takes care of. Trouble arises when Urmila's father wants her to marry Dr. Ramesh (Vasnt Thengdi), who comes from an equally wealthy family, and has just returned from abroad after completing his medical studies. Asha agrees to sacrifice her love at her father's insistence and frail condition. During the wedding ceremony, Asha faints and the marriage is postponed. Dr. Ramesh tends to her and she informs him of her love for Dilip. She then tells her father that she will only marry Dilip and he agrees. Dilip meets with an accident when he is struck by a car. He comes under Dr. Ramesh's care who has to operate on him. For some moments, Dr. Ramesh is faced with either having the woman he loves or saving Dilip. In the end he goes with his conscience and operates successfully on Dilip.

== Cast ==
- Paresh Bannerji as Dilip
- Urmila as Asha
- Vasant Thengdi as Dr. Ramesh
- Baby Shakuntala as Dilip's sister
- Manajirao

== Review ==
Baby Shakuntala in Das Baje

Raja Nene, nephew of Vishnupant Damle, started his career at Prabhat Film Company as an assistant director, working with Shantaram on Chandrasena (1935) and Amar Jyoti (1936). Das Baje in Hindi and Daha Wajta in Marathi were his first directorial ventures under Prabhat. Baburao Patel in his review of the film in the January 1943 issue of Filmindia, stated that the producers Prabhat deserved no sympathy in their review. Prabhat Film Company was "at the top of the ladder" as far their "experience and success" was concerned, intent on making "only progressive and purposeful pictures" in their own words. According to Patel, Das Baje was "neither a progressive nor a purposeful picture". Nene, who had the "unique opportunity of being trained for years under Mr. V. Shantaram" had "either wasted his time all these years... or lacks the executive capacity to harness his training...." Urmila, as Asha the college-going had an "awful" English accent. Vasant Thengdi did not suit the role, being termed as a "pretty ridiculous portrayal". Paresh Bannerji as Dilip, fails to appeal. The sister's role by Baby Shakuntala "was very well played", "Barring Baby Shakuntala, no one gave a good performance". The dialogues by Ashant "have neither life nor literature in them". Music by Keshavrao Bhole was termed "unsatisfactory".

The film was a commercial success at the box-office. The film's success guaranteed the "rise" of Raja Nene as a director. He went on to form his own production company, Raja Nene Productions, in 1947.

== Soundtrack ==
The music director was Keshavrao Bhole, who was famous for his music composition in devotional and social films like Amrit Manthan (1934), Sant Tukaram (Marathi 1936), Duniya Na Mane (Kunku, 1937) and Sant Dnyaneshwar (1940) and later for Ram Shastri (1944). The lyricist was Mukhram Sharma.

=== Song list ===
| # | Title |
|---|---|
| 1 | "Aaj Ki Duniya Kal Se Nyari" |
| 2 | "Chal Bhai Ghode Chal Chal Re" |
| 3 | "Dukh Ki Aandhi Aayi" |
| 4 | "Kahe Ko Muskayi Kali Ri" |
| 5 | "Mohe Na Baccha Kehna" |
| 6 | "Phoola Re Man Ke Phool" |
| 7 | "Sundarta Ki Khaan Kahun" |
| 8 | "Usne Kaha Inkar Kyun" |
