= List of Marathi films of 1932 =

A list of films produced by the Marathi language film industry based in Maharashtra in the year 1932.

== 1932 Releases ==
A list of Marathi films released in 1932.

Year	Film	Director	Cast	Release date	Production	Notes	Source
1932	Agnikankan: Branded Oath	Rajaram Vankudre Shantaram	Shankarrao Bhosle, Kamaladevi, Master Vinayak, Budasaheb, Nimbalkar, Leela, Baburao Pendharkar and Gajanan Jagirdar		Prabhat Films		
1932	Ayodhyecha Raja	Rajaram Vankudre Shantaram	Govindrao Tembe, Durga Khote, Baburao Pendharkar, Master Vinayak, Nimbalkar, Shankarrao Bhosle	23 January 1932	Prabhat Films	First Marathi Sound film	
1932	Shyam Sundar	Bhalji Pendharkar	Shahu Modak, Shanta Apte, Bandopant Sohoni, Baburao Ketkar, Raja Sandow, Bapurao Apte		Saraswati Cinetone	It became the first movie to celebrate silver jubilee.	
1932	Maya Machhindra	Shantaram Rajaram Vankudre	Govindrao Tembe, Durga Khote, Master Vinayak		Prabhat Films	Simultaneously made in Marathi and Hindi	
1932	Setu Bandhan	Dhundiraj Govind Phalke	Babu Rao, Udit Singh, Harban		Hindustan Cinema Film Company	Simultaneously made in Marathi and Hindi	
