= Sant Sakhu =

- Theatrical release poster
- Directed by: Vishnupant Govind Damle; Sheikh Fattelal; Raja Nene
- Produced by: Prabhat Film Company
- Starring: Hansa Wadkar; Gauri; Shankar Kulkarni
- Music by: Keshavrao Bhole
- Release date: 1941
- Running time: 2 hours 8 minutes
- Country: India
- Languages: Hindi; Marathi

Sant Sakhu is a 1941 Hindi and Marathi devotional movie directed by Vishnupant Govind Damle. The movie is based on the life of Hindu female Sant (saint) Sakhubai of Maharashtra, of the Bhakti Movement era.

== Plot ==
Sakhu Bai, an ardent devotee of Vitthal, lives with her husband and a cruel mother-in-law. The mother thinks that her daughter-in-law will spoil her only son and then he will start neglecting his mother. Her husband also does not say anything to his mother because he thinks that since he is her only son, people will disrespect him and his wife if he takes his wife's side. So Sakhu has to bear all the ill-treatment silently. She worships Vitthala with all her heart and forgets her daily sufferings.

One day, her husband's sister returns from her home with her daughter. She tells her mother how she was beaten by her mother-in-law and her husband and how they threw her out of the house. Her mother tells her to live in her home with his brother. She also starts troubling Sakhu, because she envies how his brother loves her. One day, Sakhu's husband falls ill and Sakhu defies her mother-in-law's order and comforts her husband rather than doing her prescribed work. Sakhu's mother-in-law tells her son that he has to choose between his mother and her; he chooses his mother and throws Sakhu out of the house.

A sad Sakhu sees a group of Vitthala devotees doing Naam-Kirtan. She joins the group and starts doing Naam-Kirtan. Her husband's sister finds her and tells her mother about that. The mother-in-law arrives and drags her to her home and ties her to a pole. Sakhu starts crying and worships Vitthala and after some time, things take a different turn. The movie ends with two Sakhus. People get dumbfounded by seeing two Sakhus and start thinking that she is a ghost. The movie ends by clearing everyone's doubts.

== Directors ==
- Vishnupant Govind Damle
- Sheikh Fattelal
- Raja Nene

== Cast ==
- Gauri – Mhalsakaku
- Shankar Kulkarni – Sakhu's Husband
- Shanta Majumdar – Durga
- Hansa Wadkar – Sakhu
