= Agnikankan: Branded Oath =

1932 film

- Directed by: V. Shantaram
- Written by: Baburao Pendharkar
- Produced by: Prabhat Film Company
- Starring: Master Vinayak; Kamla Devi; Leela; Shankarrao Bhosle
- Cinematography: Keshavrao Dhaiber
- Music by: Govindrao Tembe
- Production company: Prabhat Film Company
- Release date: 1932
- Running time: 129 minutes
- Country: India
- Languages: Marathi; Hindi

Agnikankan: Branded Oath (Burning Symbol) also called The Branded Oath, is a 1932 Marathi adventure film directed by V. Shantaram. The film was a Prabhat Film Company production and was a bilingual, called Jalti Nishani (Burning Symbol) in Hindi. The cinematography was done by Keshavrao Dhaiber and Art direction by S. Fatehlal. The sound direction was by Vishnupant Govind Damle and the music and lyrics were by Govindrao Tembe. Dialogues for the movie are written by Govindrao Tembe. The character artist Gajanan Jagirdar began his career in films by acting the role of a seventy-five-year-old man at the age of twenty-five. The cast included Shankarrao Bhosle, Kamala Devi, Master Vinayak, Baburao Pendharkar, Nimbalkar and Jagirdar.

== Plot ==
Senapati Naagraya (Baburao Pendharkar) rebels against the Raja of Vaijayanti (Shankarrao Bhosale), overthrows his army and kills him, but is unable to stop Rani Veermati (Kamaladevi), who escapes along with her infant son, Sudhirchandra (Master Vinayak). For 19 years she remains in hiding, branding her arm with a burning iron every year. When her son is 20, she asks him to promise to take back Vaijayanti or else she will brand her arm for the 20th time. He promises to punish the tyrant and take charge of this region in 10 days, and accordingly travels there in the company of his friend, Bhairav (Budasaheb). Once there, they prepare to meet with the Minister (Nimbalkar), who is secretly rebelling against Naagraya. What Sudhirchandra does not know is that Naagraya has decided to wed the Minister's nubile daughter (Leela Pendharkar), and that she will be involved in snaring him in a deceptive plot to have him arrested, tortured and killed.

== Cast ==
- Shankarrao Bhosle as Raja
- Kamaladevi as Rani Veermati
- Master Vinayak as Rajkumar Sudhirchandra
- Budasaheb as Bhairav (Prince's Friend)
- Nimbalkar as Minister Mantri
- Leela Chandragiri as Mantri's daughter
- Baburao Pendharkar as Commander Raja Naagraya
- Jagirdar

== Soundtrack ==
The songs in the film were composed by Govindrao Tembe, with lyrics written by Govindrao Tembe.

Marathi Soundtrack

#	Title
1	"Prabhuraya Karuna Kariti"
2	"Dehi Mala Shanticha..Aaj Chandi Cha Chamcha"
3	"Phulati Kadhi Kalika"
4	"Zunjaar Veer Nighala"

Hindi Soundtrack

The fifteen songs in the film were composed by Govindrao Tembe with the lyrics written by Narbada Prasad Aasi.

#	Title
1	"Bhanwar Na Kyun Sarsaye Phoolat Rahin Jab Komal Kaliyan"
2	"Dard Jo Dil Mein Utha Hai Na Fana Ho Jaaye"
3	"Deta Sada Raahat Aaram Pufirja Waqt-e-Shyam"
4	"Dil Mazedar Gaya Hai"
5	"Dukh Vyapi Man Dheer Dhare"
6	"Hasrat-e-dil Aur Hi Hai Hukamein Kudrat Aur Hai"
7	"Ishq Ek Gham Hai"
8	"Ek Mard Shahzor Taqatwala Ghar Se Jab Nikal Pada"
9	"Kaahe Door Rahe Piyar Piyar Madhur Ras"
10	"Kit Gaya Banwari Bana Ho Sanwariya"
11	"Khoobi Hai Aahe Niraasa Ki, Tichhi Hai Jo Nazar Khuda Ki"
12	"Mod Mudit Maati Madhukar Kali Khilkhilati"
13	"Mora Manwa Behaal Jiyara Uthat Jwala"
14	"Natkhat Nayi Nar Naveli"
15	"Sai Sarjhanhar Jag Ka Bandgi Hai Tujhko Maula"
