= Stree (1961 film) =

1961 film

- Directed by: V. Shantaram
- Written by: Arjun Dev Rushk
- Produced by: Rajkamal Kalamandir
- Starring: V. Shantaram; Sandhya
- Edited by: Madhav Kamble
- Music by: C. Ramchandra
- Release date: 1961
- Country: India
- Language: Hindi

Stree is a 1961 Indian fantasy film directed by and starring V. Shantaram, Sandhya. It is based on the play Abhijnanashakuntalam by Kalidasa. The film was selected as the Indian entry for the Best Foreign Language Film at the 34th Academy Awards, but was not accepted as a nominee. The film has music by C. Ramchandra and lyrics by Bharat Vyas. Lata Mangeshkar, Asha Bhosle, Mahendra Kapoor and Manna Dey lent their voices. "Aaj Madhuvatas Dole Madhurima Se Pran Bhar Lo" sung by Lata Mangeshkar and Mahendra Kapoor was a popular song of the era.

== Cast ==
- V. Shantaram
- Sandhya
- Rajshree
- Master Bhagwan
- Vandana
- Keshavrao Date
- Padma Chavan

== See also ==
- List of submissions to the 34th Academy Awards for Best Foreign Language Film
- List of Indian submissions for the Academy Award for Best Foreign Language Film
