= Basavaraj Rajguru =

Hindustani vocal musician

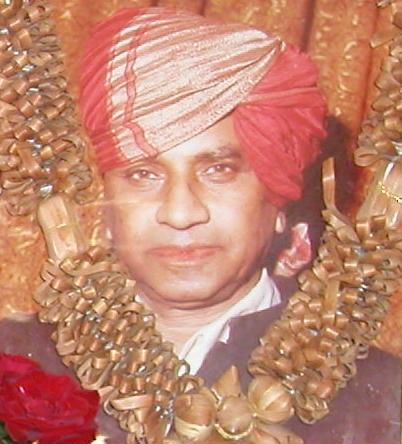
Basavraj Rajguru

Pandit Basavraj Rajguru (24 August 1920 – 21 July 1991) was a leading Indian classical vocalist in the Kirana gharana (singing style).

== Early life and training ==
Basavraj was born into a family of scholars, astrologers and musicians in Yaliwal, a village in the north Karnataka district of Dharwad, a great centre of classical music. He was initiated into classical music at an early age by his father, who was himself a renowned Carnatic musician trained in Tanjavur.

Basavaraj was fond of music from a very young age. He would try to persuade drama producers and actors to let him sing in their plays, and first became known while singing for Vamanrao Master’s traveling drama company. When he was 13 years old, he lost his father. His uncle became concerned about his future in drama. Around this time Panchakshari Gawai discovered Basavraj and took him into his tutelage.

In 1936 at the 600th anniversary of the Vijayanagara Empire in Hampi, Basavraj gave his first concert with his guru Gawai.

After the death of Gawai in 1944, Basavraj moved to Bombay and had the chance to learn from the Kirana musician and teacher Sawai Gandharva. But Sawai Gandharva was suffering from paralysis and had to leave Bombay, so he told Sureshbabu Mane, another Kirana musician, to teach Basavraj. After learning from him, Rajaguru's quest took him to the North West of Pakistan, where he learned from Waheed Khan, Gawai’s guru. In Karachi he learnt from Latif Khan for six months.

== Career ==
Basavraj's repertoire ranged from the pure classical, Khyal, to Vachanas, Natyageet, Thumri, and Ghazal (different styles of Indian music) spanning eight languages.

== Awards ==
The Government of India awarded him the Padma Shri in 1975 and the Padma Bhushan in 1991.

He also received Sangeet Natak Akademi awards from central and state governments. He was also awarded an honorary doctorate by the Karnataka University, Dharwad.

== Death ==
Basavraj died in July 1991, one of three illustrious Dharwad musicians to do so during this period (Kumar Gandharva died in January 1992 and Mallikarjun Mansur in September 1992).

== Awards ==
- Padma Bhushan

== Pt Basavaraj Rajguru Memorial National Award ==
The first Pt. Basavaraj Rajguru Memorial National Award was conferred on vocalist Pt. Ullas Kashalkar of Kolkata on 23 August 2011 during the 91st birth anniversary of Pandit Basavaraj Rajguru.

The national award carries a cash prize of Rs. 100,000 and a citation. On the occasion two young musicians Jayateerth Mevundi and Sangeeta Katti were conferred the Pt. Basavaraj Rajguru Memorial Yuva Puraskars which carry a cash prize of Rs. 25,000 each and a citation.
