= Sureshbabu Mane =

Indian Musical artist (1902–1953)

- Born: Abdul Rehman Khan; 1902; Bombay, Bombay Presicdency, British India
- Died: 1953 (aged 50–51) Pune, Bombay State
- Genre: Hindustani classical music
- Occupations: singer, actor, music educator

Sureshbabu Mane (1902 – 15 February 1953) was a prominent Hindustani classical music singer of Kirānā Gharānā in India. He was the son of a doyen of Kirana Gharana, Ustad Abdul Karim Khan.

== Early life and training ==
Sureshbabu was born as Abdul Rehman to Kirana Gharana master Ustād Abdul Karim Khān and Tārābāi Māne. Tarabai was the daughter of Sardār Māruti Rāo Māne, a brother of princely Baroda State's Rajmata during the middle of the 19th century. Ustad Abdul Karim Khan was the court musician in Baroda when Tarabai was young, and he taught her music. The two fell in love and decided to get married; but Tarabai's parents disapproved of the alliance, and the couple had to leave the state (along with Abdul Karim's brother, Ustād Abdul Haq Khān). The couple moved to Bombay (now Mumbai), and had two sons: Suresh or Abdul Rehmān, and Krishnā; and three daughters: Champākali, Gulāb, and Sakinā or Chhotutāi. In their adult lives, the five respectively became known as Sureshbābu Māne, Krishnarāo Māne, Hirābāi Badodekar, Kamalābāi Badodekar, and Saraswati Rane.

Sureshbabu had his initial training from his father, and later training from the doyen of Kirana Gharana, Ustād Abdul Wahid Khān.

== Career ==
Along with performing in concerts he also has performed in several Marathi plays, and movies.

Though not an accomplished actor, he acted in stage plays in the theatrical company formed by his younger sister Hirabai Barodekar. He appeared in plays like Sanyasa-kallol in the role of Ashwin Sheth and Subhadra, where he played the lead of Arjun. Later he acted in a few films like Amrit Manthan (1934), Chandrasena (1935), Rajput Ramani (1936) by Prabhat Films and composed music for 'Savitri' (1936, lead role by Leela Pendharkar), Devyani and Sach Hai (1939) by Saraswati Cinetone. He also played instruments like tabla and harmonium.

Artists like Pandit Bhimsen Joshi, Vasantrao Deshpande were influenced by Sureshbabu's music. Few of Sureshbabu's recordings are available today.

== Singing-style ==
Sureshbabu was an exceptionally expert in Khyāl, Thumri, Marāthi Nātya Sangeet and Bhajan. his singing was intelligent, tuneful, aesthetically rich, tender and balanced. His disciple and legendary Hindustani classical singer Prabha Atre written in her book Along Path of Music that, his music came through intuition, imagination and will power; not through hard labour. his sweet tone was the life of his singing. Deep yet delicate, it felt like a feather stroking the skin. his phrases were always rounded with neatly drawn curves and were laced with aesthetic embroidery through kan and khatkas. His singing appeared to be very simple and easy, yet it was extremely difficult to imitate. He sang intricate phrases with such ease that one would seldom notice their complexity. He used to say "sing in such a way that after concert, your music eludes the memory of your audience. They should just be filled with the aura of the concert that lingers on". He was one of the few musicians in Maharashtra of that period who was drawn to the Punjabi-style of Thumri singing. His thumri singing was legendary and many artists have taken inspiration from that.

== Disciples ==
Hirābāi Badodekar and Prabha Atre, two well-known classical music singers were among his important disciples. Vasantrao Deshpande, Pandit Bhimsen joshi, Manik Varma, Saraswati Rane, Vamanrao Deshpande, Basavaraj Rajguru, Balasaheb Atre, Vitthalrao Sardeshmukh and Menaka Shirodkar also received guidance from Sureshbabu.

== Legacy ==
Sureshbabu died on 15 February 1953 in Pune. An annual music festival is held in Mumbai by his disciple Prabha Atre by the name Sureshbabu - Hirabai Smruti Sangeet Samaroh since 1992, becoming one of the major festival of music in the country.

== Bibliography ==
- Vāman Hari Deshpande (1989). Between Two Tanpuras. Popular Prakashan. ISBN 978-0-86132-226-8.
- Kumāraprasāda Mukhopadhyaẏa (2006). The Lost World of Hindustani Music. Penguin Books India. ISBN 978-0-14-306199-1.
