= Sudarshan Rangmanch =

The Sudarshan Rangamanch is a theatre organization located in Pune, Maharashtra. It is run by the 'Maharashtra Cultural Center', a leading public charitable trust active in cultural activities. The Institution was established on 5 October 1965. Its past presidents were Smt. Yamutai Kirloskar, Dr. Pabalkar, Smt. Dr. Suru, Smt. Jyotsna Bhole. At present, the well-known actor Dr. Mohan Agashe is heading the institution.

The trust has its own mini-theatre as well as an art gallery. Many amateur theatre groups perform their plays, music and dance programmes at Sudarshan Rangmanch.
