= Lokshahir Ram Joshi =

- Poster
- Directed by: V. Shantaram; Baburao Painter
- Written by: G. D. Madgulkar
- Produced by: Rajkamal Kalamandir
- Starring: Jayaram Shiledar; Hansa Wadkar; Shakuntala Paranjpye; Sudha Apte; G D Madgulkar
- Cinematography: G. Balkrishna
- Music by: Vasant Desai
- Production company: Rajkamal Kalamandir
- Release date: 1947
- Running time: 123 minutes
- Country: India
- Language: Marathi

Lokshahir Ram Joshi (People's Poet Ram Joshi) also called Matawala Shair Ram Joshi in Hindi, is a 1947 Marathi biopic film of the poet Ram Joshi, written by G. D. Madgulkar, directed by Baburao Painter and co-directed by V. Shantaram. Shantaram had given the direction to Painter but had to complete the film when Painter fell ill during production. Produced under the Rajkamal Kalamandir banner, it is also referred to as Lok Shahir Ramjoshi. The story writer was G.D. Madgulkar, who is cited as the "first specialist film writer" in Marathi cinema. This film was his first "full-fledged writing assignment", wherein he wrote the story, screenplay, dialogue and lyrics. It was also his debut as a screenplay writer. The film starred Jayaram Shiledar as Ram Joshi and Hansa Wadkar as Baya. The rest of the cast included Shakuntala Paranjpye, Parashuram, Sudha Apte and G. D. Madgulkar.

The film, termed as the "Classic Marathi Tamasha musical" was a biopic of the poet, Kirtan, and lavani performer Ram Joshi (1758-1812), set in the Peshwa period.

== Plot ==
Ram Joshi is a Brahmin poet, who through his love of poetry and dance starts associating with the tamasha artists. He falls in love with the tamasha dancer Baya (Hansa Wadkar). The artists are of low-caste, and Joshi's interacting with them brings censure and he is outlawed by the other members of his caste. The film follows his descent into alcoholism and his redemption from it through poetry.

== Cast ==
=== Marathi ===
- Jayaram Shiledar as Ram Joshi
- Hansa Wadkar as Baya
- Shakuntala Paranjpye
- Parashuram
- G. D. Madgulkar
- Sudha Apte
- Samant
- Gundopant Walavalkar
- Jayaram Desai
- Kanase
- Sawalram
- Vaidya
- Abhyankar

=== Hindi ===
- Manmohan Krishan
- Hansa Wadkar
- Shakuntala Paranjpye
- Sudha Apte
- Jairam Desai

== Review and Box Office ==
Lokshahir Ram Joshi in Marathi Cinema became one of the "biggest post-war successes", starting the trend for the "tamasha genre" films. One of the reasons cited for the success of the film in both Marathi and Hindi, were the songs written by Madgulkar. He went on to work for other major Marathi film-makers like Raja Paranjpye, Ram Gabale, Datta Dharmadhikari and Anant Mane. V. Shantaram later used him as a story writer for Do Aankhen Barah Haath (1957). The film made use of the "vibrant lavnis" and "sawaal-jawabs" (musical question and answers), which is stated to have become a "trend-setter". As cited by Narwekar and Kul, the music and dances "enthralled" the audiences.

== Soundtrack ==
The music was composed by Vasant Desai, with lyrics by the poet Ram Joshi and Madgulkar.

=== Song list ===
#	Title	Singer	Lyricist
1	"Sundara Mana Madhe Bharali"	Jayram Shiledar	Ram Joshi
2	"Bhai Sawadh Wha"	Jayram Shiledar	Ram Joshi
3	"Hata Tata Ne Pata"	Jayram Shiledar	Ram Joshi
4	"Ek War Sangte Kanha" (Gaulan-Sawal Jabab)	Jayram Shiledar	G. D. Madgulkar
5	"Sang Sakhe Sundari-Ka Re Majshi Abola"	Jayram Shiledar, Lalita Parulekar	G. D. Madgulkar
6	"Keshav Karni Adbhut Leela"	Jayram Shiledar, Lalita Parulekar	Ram Joshi
7	"Lade Lade Aale Mi Mohna"	Jayram Shiledar, Lalita Parulekar	G. D. Madgulkar
8	"Kunjaat Madhup Gunjaarav"	Jayram Shiledar, Lalita Parulekar	Ram Joshi
9	"Narjanma Madhe Nara Karuni Ghe"	Jayram Shiledar, Lalita Parulekar	Ram Joshi

== Remakes ==
A Telugu and Tamil version, produced by Vasireddy Narayana Rao and directed by P. Pullaiah was made in 1957 called Jayabheri. The Telugu version won the 1959 Certificate of Merit for Best Feature Film in Telugu
