= Maharashtra Film Company =

Maharashtra Film Company was an Indian film production company, established by Baburao Painter in Kolhapur. Established in 1918, it was a silent film studio, which was a pioneer in Maharashtra and Marathi cinema, under the patronage of the Shahu Maharaj, the Maharaja of Kolhapur. It released the first significant historical, Sairandhari, released in Pune 7 February 1920. In the coming decade the only other major company was Dada Saheb Phalke's Hindustan Film Company. It made numerous films till the advent of talkies in 1931, but started collapsing after V. Shantaram left in 1929, to form Prabhat Film Company, it finally closed down in 1931.

== History ==
Vishnupant Damle was trusted lieutenant of Baburao Painter in his Maharashtra film Company, Kolhapur. The company had made a name for itself with its silent films in early 1920s.

Baburao Painter made many silent movies till 1930 however after a few more silent films, the Maharashtra Film Company pulled down its shutters with the advent of sound. Baburao was not particularly keen on the talkies for he believed that they would destroy the visual culture so painfully evolved over the years.

Baburao Painter's associates, V Shantaram, Keshavrao Dhaibar, and close friends Vishnupant Damle and Fateh Lal (Damle Mama and Saheb Mama) held senior posts at the company. Eventually they decided to move out of the Maharashtra Film Company and formed their own Prabhat Film Company in 1929.

=== Filmography ===
- Sinhagad)
- Sairandhri (1920)
