= 5th Venice International Film Festival =

Italian film festival in 1937

- Location: Venice, Italy
- Founded: 1932
- Festival date: 10 August – 3 September 1937
- Website: Website

Venice Film Festival chronology
- 6th 4th

The 5th annual Venice International Film Festival was held between 10 August and 3 September 1937. The new Palazzo del Cinema building was completed for this year's festival. It has been used as the venue since, excluding the years 1940 to 1948.

== Jury ==
- Giuseppe Volpi di Misurata, Italian - Jury President
- Luigi Chiarini, Italian
- Sandro De Feo, Italian
- Luigi Freddi, Italian
- Mario Gromo, Italian
- René Jeanne, Italian
- Neville Kearney, British
- Oswald Lehnich, German
- Karl Meltzer, German
- Georges Lourau, French
- Ryszard Ordynski, Polish
- Esodo Pratelli, Italian
- Louis Villani, Hungarian

== In-Competition films ==
- A Star Is Born by William A. Wellman
- Der Herrscher by Veit Harlan
- Elephant Boy by Robert J. Flaherty
- Kid Galahad by Michael Curtiz
- La grande illusion by Jean Renoir
- Les perles de la couronne by Christian-Jaque, Sacha Guitry
- Marked Woman by Lloyd Bacon
- Scipione l'africano by Carmine Gallone
- Shall We Dance by Mark Sandrich
- Theodora Goes Wild by Ryszard Bolesławski
- Victoria the Great by Herbert Wilcox
- Winterset by Alfred Santell
- Un carnet de bal by Julien Duvivier

== Awards ==
- Best Foreign Film: Un carnet de bal by Julien Duvivier
- Best Italian Film: Scipione l'africano by Carmine Gallone
- Volpi Cup:
  - Best Actor: Emil Jannings for Der Herrscher
  - Best Actress: Bette Davis for Kid Galahad and Marked Woman
- Special Recommendation:
  - Batalión by Miroslav Cikán
  - Kōjō no Tsuki by Keisuke Sasaki
  - Mária növér by Viktor Gertler
  - Sant Tukaram by Vishnupant Govind Damle, Sheikh Fattelal
  - The Flying Doctor by Miles Mander
- Honorable Mention:
  - Barbara Radziwillówna by Joseph Lejtes
  - Trzy etiudy Chopina by Eugeniusz Cekalski, Stanisław Wohl
- Best Director: Elephant Boy by Robert J. Flaherty, Zoltán Korda
- Best Screenplay: Les perles de la couronne by Sacha Guitry, Christian-Jaque
- Best Cinematography: Winterset by J. Peverell Marley
