= Jaymala Shiledar =

- Born: Pramila Jadhav; 21 August 1926; Indore, Central India Agency, India
- Died: 8 August 2013 (aged 86) Pune, Maharashtra, India
- Genres: Musicals (Sangeet Natak)
- Occupations: Singer and Stage actor
- Years active: 1942-2013

Jaymala Shiledar (21 August 1926 – 8 August 2013) was an Indian Hindustani classical singer and theatre actress. She had appeared in many sangeet nataks (musical play) where she played various roles. Along with singing for the roles she played, she had also composed music for some. In the career span of over 50 years, she appeared in more than 4500 shows. She was married to co-actor singer Jayaram Shiledar along with whom she established a production banner of "Marathi Rangabhoomi". The pair together is credited for revamping the Marathi music industry. She was presented with Padma Shri award in 2013.

== Career ==
Jayamala Shiledar started her acting and musical career with her first stage performance in 1942 in the Marathi play Veshantar. In 1945, she played the lead title role of Sharada in the sangeet natak Sangeet Sharada alongside Bal Gandharva. Gandharva had himself played the role before, when female roles were also played by men. A protege of Bal Gandharva, Shiledar was a renowned performer and drew a packed house for her performances. Jaymala had made her debut in Marathi theatre at the age of 16 and later acted in over 50 plays. She performed over 52 different roles in 46 dramas in a career She had presided over the 83rd Marathi Natya Sammelan.

=== Selective works ===
- Sangeet Sharada as Sharada in 1945
- Maan Apmaan
- Sanshaykallol
- Sangeet Saubhadra as Subhadra
- Ekach Pyala
- "Mṛcchakatika"

== Awards ==
In 2006, she was presented with the Lata Mangeshkar Award, instituted by Government of Maharashtra. She was conferred with the Padma Shri in 2013. At the time, she had said of the honour: "It was not an individual recognition, but that of Marathi musical theatre. I am overwhelmed by the honour. It is the acknowledgment of my contribution to theatre and I feel happy because the recognition has come from the Union Government. I consider this a national recognition of Marathi theatre."

== Personal life ==
Jayamala Shiledar was born Pramila Jadhav on 21 August 1926 at Indore, then part of Central India Agency, but now in Madhya Pradesh, in Central India. She married her co-actor and singer Jayram Shiledar, who was a widower with three daughters when they first met. They married in Shriram Temple at Soyagaon Village, Aurangabad District, in Maharastra state, on 23 January 1950. After marriage, she was became known as Jayamala Shiledar. They together had two daughters. Both the daughters were active in Marathi Theatre. The elder daughter's name is Deepti Bhogale (nee Lata Shiledar). The younger daughter Kirti (1952-2022) was the President of 98th Akhil Bharatiya Marathi Natya Sammelan (All India Marathi drama convention).

Jayamala Shiledar's elder sister Nirmala Deshmukh (nee Nirmala Jadhav) was a noted singer. Nirmala Deshmukh also used to accompany Bhimsen Joshi's Sant-wani programs as an organ player. Kamalakar Jadhav, their younger brother, was a music teacher at Hadas High School in Nagpur.

In 2000, Jayamala-bai underwent a bypass heart surgery and used a pacemaker. Post these operations, it was not possible for her to sing or even speak for long duration. She suffered renal failure as well as symptoms of cardiac failure in Pune after a prolonged illness and died on 8 August 2013. A large number of people who are associated with theatre and other fields paid tributes to her at Bharat Natya Mandir and Tilak Smarak Mandir where her mortal remains were kept.
