= Keshavrao Date =

Indian actor (1889–1971)

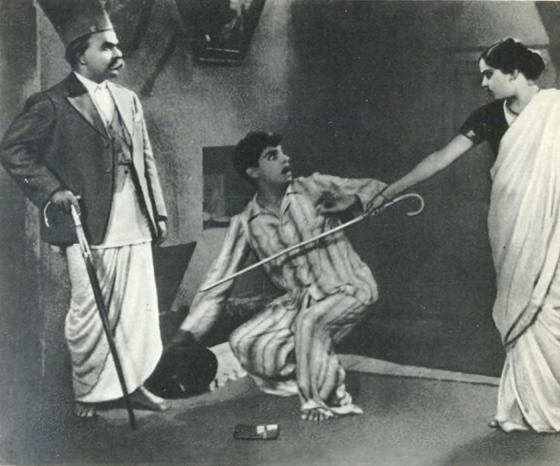
- Keshavrao Date, Raja Nene and Shanta Apte in Duniya Na Mane (Kunku, 1937)
- Born: 28 September 1889; Adivare, Ratnagiri, Maharashtra, India
- Died: 13 September 1971 (aged 81); Bombay, Maharashtra, India
- Occupations: Actor, director
- Years active: 1934–1964

Keshavrao Date (1889–1971) was an Indian film actor, who worked in both silent and sound movies. He tried to run his own drama company but found it difficult to perform the dual roles of manager and actor.

== Career ==
His role in the drama Andhalyanchi Shala ("The Blinds' School", 1933) won him rave reviews. He subsequently became a star, and joined the Prabhat Film Company.

After the advent of talkies, he tried his hand at that medium as well, though live theatre remained his chief love. His acting in the Marathi film Kunku (1937) set a standard which has rarely been approached since on the silver screen. He followed it up with another sterling performance in Prabhat Film Company's Shejari (1941). Later he performed character roles in films made in Bombay (now Mumbai), where he lived. He also acted in V. Shantaram's Dr. Kotnis Ki Amar Kahani (1946), Jhanak Jhanak Payal Baaje (1955), Navrang (1959) and Geet Gaya Patharon Ne (1964).

Keshavrao directed four films, Kisise Na Kehna (1942), Andhon Ki Duniya (1947), and Maali or Mali in Hindi (1944) and its Marathi version Bhakticha Mala (1944). Maali and Bhakticha Mala (1944) were Date's the second and third of his directorial ventures, and were produced by V. Shantaram under his new banner Rajkamal Kalamandir.

== Filmography ==
=== As actor ===
- Amrit Manthan (1934)
- Kunku (1937, Marathi)
- Chingari (1940)
- Shejari (Padosi) (1941)
- Kisise Na Kehna (1942) also director
- Dr. Kotnis Ki Amar Kahani (1946)
- Apna Desh (1949)
- Dahej (1950)
- Jhanak Jhanak Payal Baaje (1955)
- Toofan Aur Deeya (1956)
- Navrang (1959)
- Geet Gaya Patharon Ne (1964)

=== As director ===
- Kisise Na Kehna (1942)
- Andhon Ki Duniya (1947)
- Maali (1944) in Hindi
- Bhakticha Mala (1944) Marathi version of Maali
