= Purshottam Walawalkar =

Pandit Purshottam Walawalkar
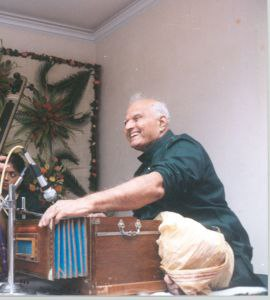
- Pandit Purshottam Walawalkar playing the Harmonium

Background information
- Born: 11 June 1923
- Origin: India
- Died: 13 January 2014 (aged 90)
- Genres: Hindustani classical music
- Occupations: Musician, Classical player
- Instruments: Harmonium

Pandit Purshottam Walawalkar (also written as Purushottam Walawalkar) (11 June 1923 - 13 January 2014) was a harmonium maestro. He helped popularise the harmonium in Maharashtra and beyond.

== Early life and training ==
Purshottam was born on 11 June 1923 to Madhavrao Walawalkar and Parvathibai Walawalkar, in the town of Sawantwadi. He learned the harmonium from three Gurus (teachers), Pandit Vitthal rao Korgaonkar (पं. विठ्ठलराव कोरगांवकर), Pandit Hanmant rao Walwekar (पं. हणमंतराव वाळवेकर) and Pandit Govindrao Tembe (पं. गोविंदराव टेंबे). He used to combine the playing styles of his three gurus.

== Performing career ==
Walawalkar has performed with many Hindustani classical music exponents like Bharat Ratna Pandit Bhimsen Joshi, Pandit Jitendra Abhisheki, Pandit C R Vyas, Pandit Ramashreya Jha, Vidushi Kishori Amonkar, Pandit Ulhas Kashalkar, Taalyogi Pandit Suresh Talwalkar, Pandit Yogesh Samsi, Pandit Prabhakar Karekar, Pandit Omkar Gulvady, Pandit Suhas Vyas, Pandit Nana Muley, Pandit Aneesh Pradhan.

The Harmonium replaced the Sarangi in the early 20th century and went through tough times as it first was banned as accompanying instrument by All India Radio (A.I.R). Hindustani classical music exponents such as Walawalkar (and many others) established the Harmonium as solo instrument in Indian Classical music.

Walawalkar (along with Pandit Appa Jalgaonkar, Pandit Tulsidas Borkar and many others) helped popularise the harmonium in Maharashtra and beyond.

Walawalkar was awarded with the Pt. Govindrao Tembe Sangatkar Puraskar in 1999.

Pandit Shrinivas Acharya is Walawalkar's Gandabandha Shishya. Manvendra Singh Gohil is also a disciple of Walawalkar.

== Personal life ==
Smt. Subhalaxmi Walawalkar was Walawalkar's wife. He has 3 sons, Subhash, Damodar and Suresh. Sheetal Kanolkar and Alka Samant are his daughters.

== Death ==
He was suffering from a lung infection. Walawalkar died in his Vile Parle home. He died on 13 January 2014.

== See also ==
- Pandit Govindrao Tembe
- Pandit Bhimsen Joshi
- Pandit C R Vyas
