= Chandrasena (1935 film) =

Indian film directed by V. Shantaram

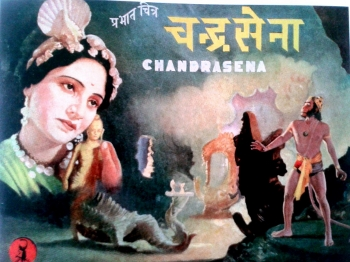
- Directed by: V. Shantaram
- Written by: Shivram Vashikar
- Produced by: Prabhat Film Company
- Starring: Nalini Tarkhad; Sureshbabu Mane; Kelkar; Azurie
- Cinematography: Keshavrao Dhaiber
- Music by: Keshavrao Bhole
- Production company: Prabhat Film Company
- Release date: 1935
- Running time: 136 min
- Country: India
- Language: Marathi/Hindi

Chandrasena is a 1935 Hindi/Marathi mythology drama film directed by V. Shantaram for his Prabhat Film Company. The film was the first Indian trilingual film to be made simultaneously in Hindi, Marathi. The cinematographer was K. Dhiaber and the story and dialogue were by Shivram Vashikar. The music direction was by Keshavrao Bhole, with lyrics written by K. Narayan Kale. The cast included Nalini Tarkhad, Sureshbabu Mane, Kelkar, Rajani, Shantabai and Azurie.

The film was a remake of the Shantaram and Dhaiber-directed Marathi film Chandrasena of 1931. The story revolves around an episode in the Ramayana, where Chandrasena, wife of Ahiravan, (Mahiravan's (brother), helps Hanuman defeat Mahiravana's army, and in the process free Rama and Lakshmana from Pataal.

== Plot ==
Indrajit, Son of Ravana, has Rama and Lakshmana kidnapped by Ahiravan and Mahiravana. Mahi hides them away in Pataal. Hanuman, the monkey-god, goes to their help. He is stopped by Makardhwaja, whom he defeats. Makar takes him to Chandrasena, wife of Mahi, who worships Rama and desires to spend her life with him. With her help, Hanuman manages to defeat the entire army of Mahi and ultimately Mahi himself when he continues to multiply into a vast army. Chandrasena tells Hanuman the secret of destroying Mahi, because of which he is able to release Rama and Lakshmana from Pataal.

== Cast ==
- Nalini Tarkhad as Chandrasena
- Rajni
- Sureshbabu Mane as Ram
- Kulkarni as Lakshman
- Mane Pahelwan
- Kelkar as Mahiravan
- Manajirao as Hanuman
- Buwasaheb
- Shantabai
- Azurie

== Production ==
The film is cited to be the first to make use of the trolley. It made excessive use of special effects, especially showing flying figures, magic arrows and a gigantic Hanuman.

== Remakes ==
Several remakes of the episode from the Ramayana involving the episode of Chandrasena have been produced. This 1935 version itself was made both in Hindi, Marathi. The Prabhat Film Company had made the early version Chandrasena in 1931. Homi Wadia made Chandrasena (1959) under his Basant Pictures banner, which was directed by Babubhai Mistry.

== Soundtrack ==
The music composer for the film was Keshavrao Bhole, with lyrics written by K. Narayan Kale. The singers were Rajni, Nalini Tarkhud, Sureshbabu Mane and Buwa Saheb.

=== Song list ===
#	Title	Singer
1	"Kaisi Manohar hai Maaya Prachalit Chhaya Sansar Saara"	Sureshbabu Mane
2	"Bhootnath Bhakton Ka Sada Ubaara"	
3	"Madira Chhalkan Laagi Gore Gore Haathon Se Paani"	Rajni
4	"Abla Ki Pukar Suno Bhagwan Mere Ram Prabhu"	Nalini Tarkhud
5	"Jai Jai Jagdish Ish Sharan Main Tihari"	Sureshbabu Mane
6	"Chori Chori Nahin Yeh Kamaal Hai"	Buwa Saheb
7	"Matwari Mori Yaad Vhandrasena Meri Yaad Nahin"	Sureshbabu Mane
8	"Sura Pi Lo Swarg Ghar Ho Jaana"	
9	"Pee Lo Pee Lo Surahi Main Naav Ki"	Sureshbabu Mane
10	"Pal Chhin Laagi Lagan Tori"	Nalini Tarkhud
11	"Rangili Raswali Phoolon Ki Behti Laali"	Rajni
12	"Nek Thehr More Mann Aas Khaaye Bawre Aali"	Rajni
