= Jayaram Shiledar =

Marathi actor

Jayaram Shiledar (1915–1992) was an actor and singer in Marathi films and on Marathi musical stage.

== Early life and family ==
Jayaram Shildar was born in 1915 in the city of Belgaum, in the present day Indian state of Karnataka. He had three daughters with his first wife, who died in 1940s. In 1948, he fell in love with Pramila Jadhav, his leading lady on the musical stage. The two married in 1950. After marriage, Pramila adopted the name Jayamala Shiledar, who was a noted singer in her own right. The couple had two daughters, Lata (also known as Dipti Bhogle after her marriage) and the more famous younger daughter, Keerti. Both daughters had successful careers as actresses on Marathi stage. Keerti (1952–2022) presided over the 98th Akhil Bharatiya Marathi Natya Sammelan (All India Marathi drama convention).

== Career ==
Jayaram Shiledar was the leading man in many Marathi films of the late 1940s. He played the lead in the popular Marathi film on Peshwa era Lavani artist and poet, Ram Joshi. The film was produced by V. Shantaram and called Lokshahir Ram Joshi. The film popularized inclusion of Marathi folk dance called Lavani in films. His other Marathi language films include Meethbhakar and Jivacha sakha, both released in 1940s.

Jayaram Shiledar and Jayamala Shiledar formed a drama company called Marathi Rangbhoomi in 1949. The company produced 25 musicals (Sangeet Natak) on Marathi stage in the following decades. Notable dramas produced by their company include Ekhadyacha Nashib, Mumbaichi Manasa, Anant Phandi, Abhogi, and Swarsamradni.
