= Kirti Shiledar =

Indian singer (1952–2022)

Keerti Shiledar (16 August 1952 – 22 January 2022), sometimes spelled Kirti Shiledar, was an Indian singer of Hindustani classical music and an actress on Marathi musical stage. She presided over the 98th Akhil Bharatiya Marathi Natya Sammelan (All India Marathi drama convention) held in 2018.

== Early life ==
Keerti Shiledar was born in 1952, as the daughter of Marathi stage actors Jayaram Shiledar and Jaymala Shiledar, who are credited with keeping the Marathi musical stage alive during the lean years for this genre during the period. She started her acting career at the age of 12 when she officially joined the Marathi Rangbhumi Natak Company of her parents and participated in various Marathi musicals. She received her training in Hindustani classical vocals by actor and musician Nilkanth Abhyankar.

== Stage career ==
She performed in several Marathi musical dramas, including Sangeet Swarsamradni, Sangeet Kanhopatra, Yayati Aani Devyani, Sangeet Raamrajyaviyog, Sanshay Kallol, Swaymvar, Sangeet Shakuntal, Saubhadra, Mrutchha Katik, Mandodari, and Ekach Pyala.

== Personal life and death ==
Keerti Shiledar died of kidney ailments in Pune, on 22 January 2022, at the age of 69.
