= Dahej (film) =

1952 film

- Directed by: V. Shantaram
- Written by: Shams Lucknavi
- Produced by: Rajkamal Kalamandir
- Starring: Prithviraj Kapoor; Jayshree; Karan Dewan; Lalita Pawar
- Cinematography: V. Avadhoot
- Music by: Vasant Desai
- Production company: Rajkamal Kalamandir
- Release date: 24 January 1950
- Running time: 149 minutes
- Country: India
- Language: Hindi

Dahej (Dowry) is a 1950 Hindi social family drama film based on the dowry system directed by V. Shantaram.

Produced by Rajkamal Kalamandir, the director of photography was V. Avadhoot. Music was composed by Vasant Desai with lyrics by Shams Lucknavi, who also wrote the story and dialogues.

The film starred Prithviraj Kapoor, Karan Dewan, Jayshree, Ulhas, Mumtaz Begum, Keshavrao Date and Lalita Pawar.

The story is set in the city of Lucknow and involves the social issue of dowry. The film is about a young bride who faces suffering and humiliation for not bringing a dowry and then makes the "ultimate sacrifice" with her death.

== Plot ==
Thakur (Prithviraj Kapoor), his wife (Mumtaz Begum) and daughter Chanda (Jayshree) live in a big old-style house. Though he has this ancestral property, Thakur is not wealthy and he makes this clear to lawyer Biharilal (Ulhas) and his wife (Lalita Pawar) when they ask for Chanda's hand in marriage. He tells them that he can not give a dowry as tradition demands. The lawyer says he does not want a dowry for his son Suraj (Karan Dewan) and are happy having Chanda in their house. He has said this thinking that Thakur is rich and would anyway give a dowry. Soon after the marriage, the lawyer dies and Chanda's blamed by her mother-in-law for bringing bad luck. She plans to throw Chanda out of the house and get Suraj remarried. Meanwhile, seeing the suffering his daughter has to endure Thakur decides to sell his entire property and get a big dowry for Chanda. He proceeds to bring the dowry to Chanda's house with big fanfare. Suraj lies hurt following an accident and Chanda's mother-in-law refuses to let Chanda look after him. In the melee, Chanda also gets hurt when the door she's standing against is broken down. Suraj hearing the commotion gets out of his bed and collapses dead. Thakur reaches the house only to have Chanda die in his arms.

== Cast ==
- Jayashree as Chanda
- Prithviraj Kapoor as Thakur (Chanda's father)
- Karan Dewan as Suraj
- Lalita Pawar as Suraj's mother
- Ulhas as Lawyer Biharilal, Suraj's father
- Keshavrao Date
- Shantarin
- Mumtaz Begum as Thakur's wife
- Shantarin
- Lata Rao

== Soundtrack ==
The music was by Vasant Desai with lyrics by Shams Lucknavi. The singers were Shamshad Begum, Krishna Goyal, Jayshree.

=== Song list ===
#	Title	Singer
1	"Ambua Ki Daari Pe Bole Re Koyaliya"	Jayshree
2	"Jo Dil Pe Guzarte Hai"	Jayshree
3	"Dil De Chuke Ab Maloom Hua"	Jayshree
4	"Woh To Baan Bareli Se Aaya"	Jayshree
5	"Tez Hawaye Toofani Dariya"	Jayshree
6	"Ae Kale Badal Bol"	Shamshad Begum
7	"Ui Chuudi Dheere Pehna Chuudi Waley Ho"	Shamshad Begum
8	"Ab Zindagi Ka Bojh Uthaya Na Jayega"	Krishna Goyal
9	"Aa Ja Nigahon Mein Aa Ja"	Krishna Goyal
