= Saraswati Rane =

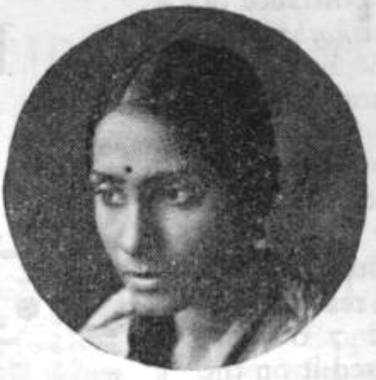
- Saraswati Mane (later Rane), from a 1937 issue of The Indian Listener

Background information
- Born: 4 October 1913; Miraj, Bombay Presidency, British India
- Origin: Miraj, Maharashtra
- Died: 10 October 2006 (aged 93) Mumbai, Maharashtra, India
- Genres: Hindustani Classical, Khayal, Thumri, Bhajan, Abhang, etc.
- Occupation: Hindustani Classical vocalist
- Years active: 1933–2006

Saraswati Rane (4 October 1913 – 10 October 2006) was an Indian classical singer in the Hindustani Classical genre. She was a daughter of Ustad Abdul Karim Khan (1872–1937), the founder of Kirana Gharana. Her family had a long and rich music tradition. She got her initial training of vocal music of the Kirana Gharana style from her elder brother Sureshbabu Mane and elder sister Hirabai Barodekar, who themselves were the doyens of Indian classical music of their times. Later, she also sang along with elder sister, Hirabai Bododekar, especially in jugalbandi style.

== Early life and training ==
Born on 4 October 1913, to Ustad Abdul Karim Khan (1872–1937), the founder of Kirana Gharana, and Tarabai Mane, as Sakina, she grew up in a musical household. After separating from her husband, Tarabai, her mother, renamed all her five children; hence Sakina became Kumari Saraswati Mane. She was initiated into music by her brother Sureshbabu Mane, later after 1930, she also started learning from her sister Hirabai Barodekar.

To enhance her musical knowledge she also got taleem (training) from ustads of different gharanas like the nephew of Alladiya Khan, Ustad Natthan Khan of Jaipur gharana, Prof. B. R. Deodhar and Pandit Master Krishnarao Phulambrikar of Gwalior gharana.

== Career ==
Saraswatibai started her musical career at a very early age of seven years with stage acting in musical dramas like Sangeet Saubhadra, Sangeet Sanshaykallol, Sangeet Ekach Pyala etc. Right from a young age, i.e., since 1929, she started acting in major roles with noted artists like Balgandharva and other in shows all over India.

In 1933, she started performing on Akashwani. She continued performing on All India Radio as a top grade artist until 1990, when she declared her retirement from public performances. She is amongst the few classical vocalists to have participated in many Radio Sangeet Sabhas from Kanyakumari to Peshawar (now in Pakistan) from the early 1940s to mid 1980s.

She was amongst the first female artists to give playback for Hindi and Marathi films. Her first playback was in Marathi film Payachi Dasi, directed by Acharya Atre. She remained in the field till 1954. Her song from the Hindi film Ramrajya..`Bina Madhur Madhur Kachu Bol’ reached the peak of popularity all over India, and she was awarded by His Master's Voice for the highest sale of gramophone records at the time.

She also performed in the playback for Hindi film, Sargam (1950), and Bhumika (1977), directed by noted director Shyam Benegal.

She sang under the music direction of music directors like C. Ramchandra, Shankarrao Vyas, K. C. Day, and Sudhir Phadke.

Saraswatibai was invited to participate on the eve of first independence Day at Delhi. She was also invited to participate in a grand celebration at Shivneri on the first Maharashtra Din by the then chief minister Late Yashwantrao Chavan.

In the same period she became a popular singer of Marathi light classical songs, popularly known as Bhav-geet, and her records gained widespread popularity in Maharashtra.

She was among the few top artists of India invited to prestigious music conferences held in places such as Mumbai, Kolkata, Delhi, Chennai, Baroda, Bhopal and Gwalior. She often performed at the PuneSawai Gandharva Music Festival.

Saraswatibai and her elder sister, Hirabai Barodekar were pioneers of jugalbandi vocal recital by women. Their jugalbandi recital garnered a worldwide popularity from 1965 to 1980.

Their jugalbandi (long playing) records and now cassettes are still in demand.

Saraswatibai taught classical music, some of her students became well known figures in the field. Her grand daughter Meena Faterpekar is one of the very few female classical vocalists from Kirana Gharana pursuing the same tradition.

== Personal life ==
She was married to Sunderrao Rane. She died on 10 October 2006.

== Awards and recognition ==
Sarswatibai was awarded: 1. Balgandharva Purskar (Government of Maharashtra, 1966) 2. Balgandharva Gold Medal 3. ITC Sangeet Research Academy Award 4. Yeshwantrao Chavan Puraskar 5. Guru Mahatmya Puraskar (Maharashtra) 6. Ustad Faiyaz Ahmed Khan Memorial Trust (Kirana Gharana Award 1999)

== See also ==
Prabha Atre
