= Dr. Kotnis Ki Amar Kahani =

1946 film

Dr Kotnis ki Amar Kahani
- Theatrical release poster
- Directed by: V. Shantaram
- Written by: V. P. Sathe
- Screenplay by: K. A. Abbas
- Story by: K. A. Abbas
- Produced by: V. Shantaram
- Starring: V. Shantaram; Jayashree Kamulkar
- Cinematography: V. Avadhoot
- Edited by: Babu Marwad
- Music by: Vasant Desai
- Production company: Rajkamal Kalamandir
- Distributed by: Rajkamal Kalamandir
- Release date: 16 March 1946
- Running time: 124 minutes
- Country: India
- Languages: Hindustani; English

Dr. Kotnis ki Amar Kahani (English: The eternal tale of Dr. Kotnis) is a 1946 Indian film in Hindustani as well as English, written by Khwaja Ahmad Abbas and directed by V. Shantaram. The English version was titled The Journey of Dr. Kotnis. Both versions starred Shantaram in the title role. The film is based on the life of Dwarkanath Kotnis, an Indian doctor who worked in China during the Japanese invasion in World War II. The film was screened in competition at the 1947 Venice Film Festival.

== Overview ==
The film was based on the story "And One Did Not Come Back" by Khwaja Ahmad Abbas, which is itself based on the heroic life of Dr. Dwarkanath Kotnis, played by V. Shantaram in the film.

Dr. Kotnis was sent to China during the Second World War to provide medical assistance to the troops fighting against the Japanese invasion in Yenan province.

While in China he met and courted a Chinese girl, Gou Qinglan. He died of Epilepsy in China.

== Cast ==
Lead cast:

- V.Shantaram as Dwarkanath Kotnis
- Jayashree Kamulkar as Gou Qinglan

Rest of the cast, listed alphabetically:

- Baburao Pendharkar as General Fong
- Jankidas as Dr. Mukerjee (as Janki Dass)
- Keshavrao Date as Dr. Kotnis' father
- Master Vinayak as Bundoo
- Pratima Devi as Dr. Kotnis' mother (as Pratimadevi)
- Prof. Hudlikar as Dr. Atal
- Rajshree as Dr. Kotnis' son
- Salvi as Dr. Cholkar
- Ulhas as Dr. Basu
