= Vishnupant Govind Damle =

Indian filmmaker (1892–1945)

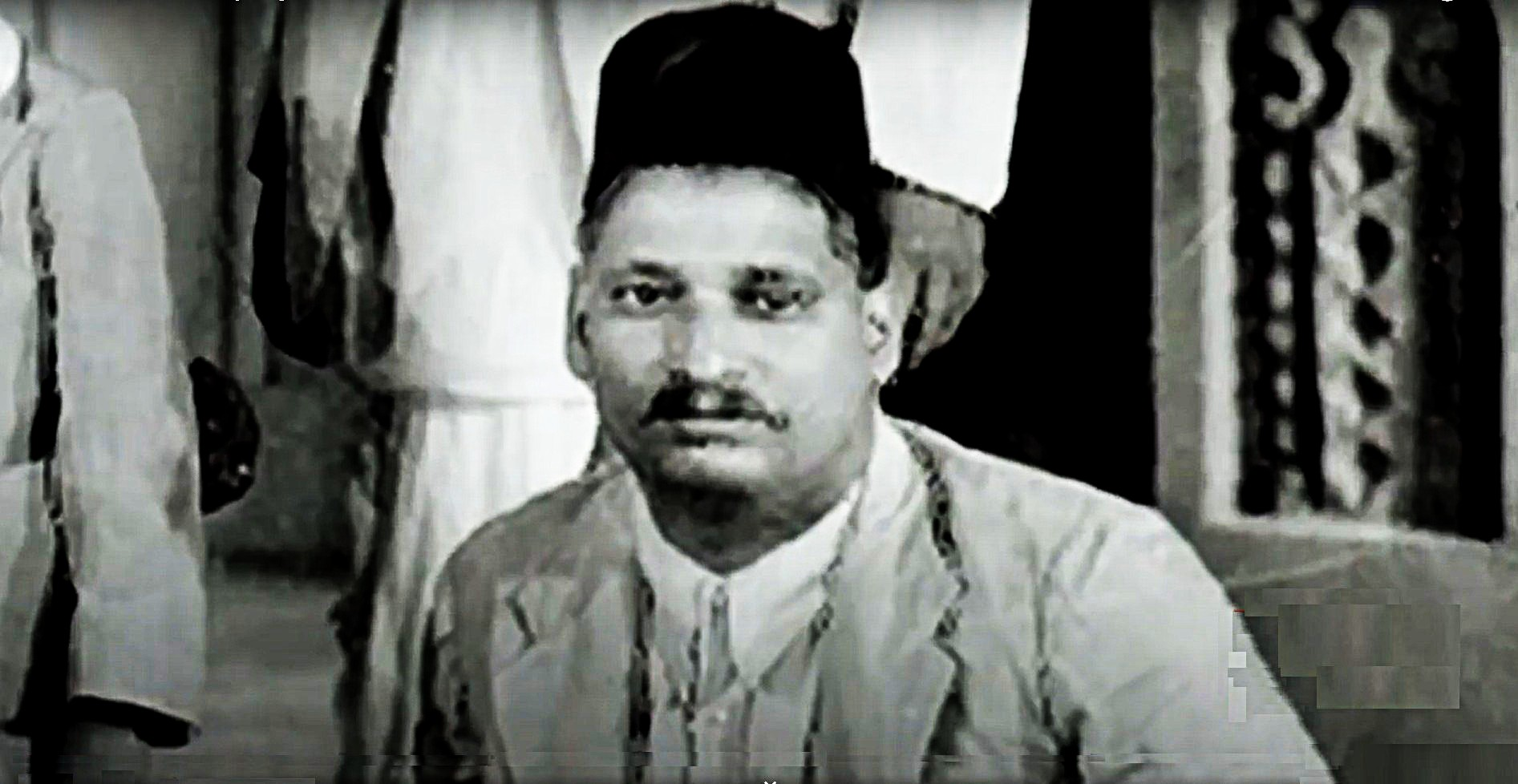
- Born: Vishnupant Govind Damle; 14 October 1892; Bombay, British India
- Died: 5 July 1945 (aged 52); Pune, Maharashtra
- Notable work: Maharathi Karna; Sant Tukaram; Sant Dnyaneshwar; Sant Sakhu

Vishnupant Govind Damle (14 October 1892 – 5 July 1945) was an Indian production designer, cinematographer, film director and sound engineer for Marathi films. His 1937 film Sant Tukaram was the first Marathi film to be screened at an international film festival. It won a "Special Recommendation" at the 5th Venice International Film Festival.

== Life ==
Damle was born at Pen, Raigad District, Maharashtra on 14 October 1892. He learned stage painting from Anandrao Painter, Baburao Painter's cousin, with whom he co-founded the Maharashtra Film Company in 1918. He worked as a decorator, set designer, actor, cinematographer and film developer. One of his colleagues, Fattelal Sheikh, worked closely with Damle until his death. Together, they had their directorial debut with the release of the 1928 silent film Maharathi Karna.

Damle left the Maharashtra Film Company in 1929 and founded the Prabhat Film Company with V. Shantaram, Fattelal and Keshavrao Dhaiber. There he was head of the sound department and introduced new technologies in the playback Marathisprachigen film.

As a director at Prabhat Film Company Damle, he and Fattelal created the "saints" films, such as Sant Tukaram (1936), which was declared one of the three top films at the Venice Film Festival and received a special mention. His last film was Sant Sakhu (1941).

Film Ayodyecha Raja, produced by Prabhat Film Company, in 1932 had Damle as its sound recordist. This is the first available talkie film of Indian film industry.

Damle Fattelal duo had done cinematography for Prabhat's following silent films

- Gopal Krishna 1929
- Khooni Khanjar 1930
- Rani Sahiba urfa Bajarbattu 1930
- Udaykal 1930
- Chandrasena 1931
- Julum 1931

Damle had done sound recording of following films produced by Prabhat

Ayodhyecha Raja 1932
Agni Kankan - Jalti Nishani in Hindi 1932
Maya Machindra 1932
Sinhagad 1933
Sairandhri 1933
Amrit Manthan 1934
Chandrasena 1935
Dharmatma 1935

Films directed by Damle And Fattelal duo in Prabhat film company

Sant Tukaram year 1936
Sant Dyneshwar year 1940
Gopal Krishna year 1938
Ramshastri year 1944
Sant Sakhu year 1942

He died on 5, July, 1945 in Pune, Maharashtra, India.

== Filmography ==
- 1928: Maharathi Karna
- 1938: Gopal Krishna
- 1940: Sant Dnyaneshwar
- 1941: Sant Sakhu
- 1937: Sant Tukaram
