= Ayodhyecha Raja =

1932 film

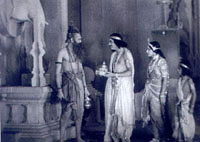
- अयोध्येचा राजा
- Directed by: Shantaram Rajaram Vankudre (V. Shantaram)
- Written by: N.V. Kulkarni (story and screenplay)
- Produced by: Prabhat Film Company
- Starring: Govindrao Tembe; Durga Khote; Baburao Pendharkar; Master Vinayak
- Cinematography: Keshavrao Dhaiber
- Edited by: Rajaram Vankudre Shantaram
- Music by: Govindrao Tembe
- Production company: Prabhat Film Company
- Release date: 23 January 1932
- Running time: 146 min
- Country: India
- Languages: Marathi; Hindi

Ayodhyecha Raja, literally "The King of Ayodhya", was the first Marathi talkie, released in 1932. A mythological drama, it was directed by Shantaram Rajaram Vankudre. It is based on the puranic story of Raja Harishchandra of Ayodhya and his test by sage Vishwamitra, as recounted in Valmiki's epic, Ramayana.

The film was also made as a double-version, Ayodhya Ka Raja (1932) in Hindi, making it the first double version talkie of Indian cinema, wherein Munshi Ismail Farogh wrote the Hindi dialogue, while screenwriter N.V. Kulkarni also did Marathi dialogue. India's first full-length feature film, Raja Harishchandra (1913), was also made on the same storyline.

== Significance ==
The film was not just Prabhat Film Company's first talkie film, but also for its director, V. Shantaram. In its time, it was a leap in sound, song and dialogue quality and became a hit. Eventually, it turned out to be a social leap as well for the film industry, as the entry of Durga Khote, who belonged to an upper class and elite Brahmin family into Marathi cinema, paved way for other women from upper classes to enter cinema. V. Shantaram made another version film, Duniya Na Mane (Kunku in Marathi) in 1937.

After the 2003 fire at the National Archives of India, Pune in which prints of first Indian talkie Alam Ara (1931) were lost, it is also the earliest surviving talkie of Indian cinema.

== Cast ==
- Govindrao Tembe as Harishchandra
- Mrs Durga Khote as Taramati
- Digambar as Rohitashwa
- Nimbalkar as Vishwamitra
- B.Desai as Jatadhar
- Sushila as Maid Queen
- B.Pendharkar as Ganganath
- Vinayak as Narad
- G.R. Mane as Domb

== Soundtrack ==
Ayodhyecha Raja has music by Govindrao Tembe:

- "Shiv Shankara, Girjavaran"
- "Jai Jai Rajadiraj"; singer: Vasant Desai
