= Chandrasena (1931 film) =

1931 film

- Directed by: V. Shantaram; Keshavrao Dhaiber
- Produced by: Prabhat Film Company
- Starring: Lilavati Pendharkar; Gulbbai; G. R. Mane; Kamla
- Cinematography: Keshavrao Dhaiber
- Production company: Prabhat Film Company
- Release date: 1931
- Country: India
- Languages: Silent film Marathi intertitles

Chandrasena is a 1931 Indian silent film directed by V. Shantaram and Keshavrao Dhaiber. The director of photography was Keshavrao Dhaiber. Produced under the banner of Prabhat Film Company, the film brought the company into the "frontline" of film makers. The cast included Lila, "alias" Lilavati Pendharkar, who was making her debut with this film, with Kamla, Gulabbai and G. R. Mane.

The film's story involved an episode from the epic Ramayana. Ahiravan's wife, Chandrasena helps Hanuman to rescue Rama and Lakshmana from Patala and in the process defeat Mahiravana's army.

The use of the trolley was made for the first time in Chandrasena. The Prabhat company films, were cited to be of "high quality" even though their content was similar to others produced around the same time.

== Cast ==
- Lila
- Kamla
- Gulabbai
- G. R. Mane
