= Jyotsna Bhole =

Indian singer and actress (1914–2001)

Jyotsna Keshav Bhole
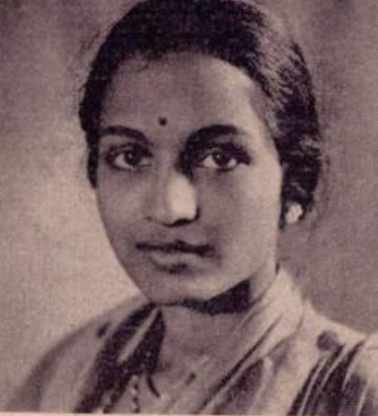
- Jyotsna Keshav Bhole, from a 1939 issue of The Indian Listener
- Born: Durga Kelekar; 11 May 1914; Goa
- Died: 5 August 2001 (aged 87); Pune, Maharashtra
- Known for: Marathi theatre Hindustani classical music
- Spouse: Keshav Vaman Bhole
- Children: 4

Jyotsna Keshav Bhole, also known as Jyotsnabai Bhole (11 May 1914 – 5 August 2001), was a veteran Marathi stage artist and a Hindustani classical singer. Along with Padmabai Vartak, she was among the first female actresses to perform the role of a female character in Marathi theatre in the play Andhalyachi Shala in 1933.

Bhole was popularly known for the drama song Bola Amrut Bola composed by Sangeetkalanidhi Master Krishnarao Phulambrikar. She was awarded Sangeet Natak Akademi Award in 1976, given by the Sangeet Natak Akademi, India's National Academy of Music, Dance & Drama.

== Early life and education ==
Jyotsna was born on 11 May 1914 as Durga Kelekar (केळेकर, not to be confused with the more prevalent name 'Kelkar') in a small village in Goa. She was one of the fourteen siblings born to Radhabai and Vaman Kelekar. From a young age, she had an inclination towards music. After completing second grade in a local school, she moved to Mumbai at the age of eight with her elder sister Girijabai, who was also a singer. Durga Kelekar, as she was then named, lived on Lamington Road and attended the municipal school there, until the fourth grade. Subsequently, she left the school as her main goal was to pursue music. Moving to Mumbai for music education proved to be a lucky break for her.

Girijabai used to train under the famous singer Vilayat Hussain Khan of Agra gharana. Jyotsnabai also started training under Khadim Hussain Khan of Agra gharana. During the school days, she had already carved a name for herself after winning inter-school singing competitions in Mumbai. She also sang on the Bombay station of the Indian Broadcasting Corporation radio, three or four times a month. As a result, she became quite famous as a child singer. By the age of thirteen or fourteen, she was well versed in Raga based music.

== Career ==
=== Singing ===
During the 1920s and 30s in Maharashtra, the genre of Bhavageet began to take root, especially in the sung poetry scene of Mumbai. Keshavrao Bhole was a pioneer of this genre, who was well known and popular among music lovers as a bhavgeet singer. He had already made a name for himself with his plays and he also wrote reviews on music under the pseudonym Eklavya. As a result, his name was the talk of the town in the music industry. Jyotsnabai's brother Ramrai was a friend and admirer of Keshavrao. He requested the latter to teach bhavgeet to his sister. When Jyotsnabai heard Keshavrao sing, she was obsessed with the unique and beautiful style of this genre. It was for the first time she had realized the importance of emotion in a song. Following this encounter, she learned the nuances of this style with utmost dedication.

Keshavrao's place in Jyotsnabai's musical life was quite important. They married in 1932, when the latter was only eighteen years old. After their marriage, her artistic talents began to flourish. Keshavrao had good relations with singers like Manji Khan, Ramkrishnabuwa Vaze, Mallikarjun Mansur and Master Krishnarao among many others. He had collected a number of bandish pieces from them. Meanwhile, Jyotsnabai trained and studied with many teachers, including singers from the Bhendibazaar gharana, to hone her skills. The features of different gharanas created an independent and effective chemistry in her singing. Within a few months, she received the appreciation of Prof. B. R. Deodhar and avid listeners after singing at a concert in the latter's musical circle. In the years that followed, Jyotsnabai performed at several important music festivals across the country. Her singing captivated the audience with her strong sense of rhythm, melody, elegance and sweetness. She presented a beautiful combination of singing styles, with subtle musical awareness and emotion. Ragas such as Gorakh Kalyan, Bhim, Madhmad Sarang, Shuddha Bhatiyar, Shamkalyan, Jaldhar-Kedar etc. became popular as a speciality of Jyotsnabai.

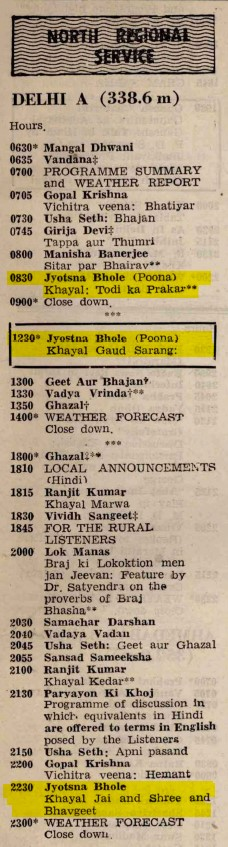
Broadcast schedule for songs by Jyotsna Bhole from the Delhi station of All India Radio (AIR) on Tuesday, 16 September 1958. Akashvani Magazine, 14 September 1958.

In addition to live concerts, Jyotsnabai’s songs were also broadcast by the Mumbai and Delhi stations of the All India Radio (AIR). Gradually, she gained immense popularity as a bhavgeet singer among the masses. Seeing the growing demand for her songs, a national program of music was organized by AIR wherein her songs were broadcast across India on 6 April 1974 at 9:30PM. In her performances, she mostly used to sing compositions of poets and lyricists like Raja Badhe, Anant Kanekar and M. G. Rangnekar. Among her well known bhavgeet songs were Badhe's three songs about Maher (Parent's home) from which Majhiya Mahera Ja, composed by P. L. Deshpande became widely popular. Record companies such as Young India and His Master's Voice also released a number of recordings of her songs that reached places where she or her plays could not.

=== Theatre ===
In the year 1932, Krishna Cinetone's film Sant Sakhu was being shot with music by Keshav Bhole. Jyotsnabai played the role of Sakhu in the movie. At that time her name was Durga Bhole. However, another actress named Durga Shirodkar was also working in the movie. Due to the confusion between the two actresses, the younger Durga was renamed as Jyotsna and thus the name Jyotsna Bhole came into being.

Within a year, Jyotsnabai got the chance to act in the play Andhalyachi Shala (School for the Blind). First show of this play took place on 1 July 1933 at Ripon Theatre (now Alfred Talkies) in Mumbai. Jyotsnabai and Padmabai Vartak stood on the stage as female leads for the first time, insisting that women themselves should play the women's role in theatre. Before this, only Hirabai Barodekar and her sisters had set up a theatre troupe and worked on the stage in 1930. The play was not only a modern drama in that sense, but the bhavgeet based on Anant Kanekar's writings were also effective and relevant. It also used background music for the first time which was composed by Keshavrao himself.

Jyotsnabai's debut on the theatre stage was historically significant due to her combination of form, music and acting. Her natya sangeet (acting-singing) was crisp and penetrating, with restraint. Later, when she joined Natyaniketan in 1941, she became well-established as a singer-actress. Bhole played the lead role in a total of eleven plays in the organization, of which Sangeet Kulvadhu (Musical, Family Bride) brought her immortal fame. The vocals for the song Bola Amrut Bola in this play have been synonymous with her name, where music by Master Krishnarao played an important role in success of this play. Other notable plays of Bhole were Ashirwad, Alankar, Ek Hota Mhatara, Rambha, Vidya Haran, Bhoomikanya Seeta, and Radhamayi.

=== Writing ===
Jyotsnabai also induged in writing during her lifetime. She wrote the musical Aradhana around 1960 including the work on production, direction, poetry and music. Four years later, she published a letter-book called Antarichya Khuna, which included letters written to her daughter during her trip to Britain and Europe. In 1998, three years before her death, she released her autobiography in Marathi, titled Tumchi Jyotsna Bhole (Yours Jyotsna Bhole).

== Awards and recognition ==
- 1976 - Sangeet Natak Akademi Award
- 1980 - Vishnudas Bhave Award for contribution to Marathi theatre
- 1984 - Unopposed election as President of the 64th Natya Sammelan
- 1995 - Lata Mangeshkar Award by Gomantak Marathi Academy
- 1999 - Lata Mangeshkar Award of the Government of Maharashtra

== Personal life ==
Jyotsnabai married Keshavrao in January 1932. They had four children which included three sons - Kishor (b. November 1932), Suhas (b. August 1935), Anil (b. April 1938) and a daughter - Vandana (b. 1945). Bhole managed to strike the balance between the time she invested in her work and taking care of the family, especially because a lot of times members from their extended family also lived with them. This was remarkable in itself, as pointed out by her daughter in the memoir she has written about her parents (in Marathi).

== Death and legacy ==
Jyotsnabai died on 5 August 2001 in Pune, Maharashtra at the age of 87. In 2009, a music festival by the name Jyotsna Bhole Swarotsav was organized in Pune by Srujan Foundation in memory of Bhole. It was conducted for eleven years until 2018, from the last found mention of the festival. A two-day event to celebrate the birth centenary of Jyotsnabai took place in Goa in 2013, which included musical evenings and a short film. Jyotsna Bhole Sabhagruha, a theatre hall named after the singer-actress was inaugurated in Pune in 2012. It is owned and managed by the Maharashtra Cultural Centre.

== See also ==
- Marathi theatre
- Sangeet Natak
- Hindustani classical music
