= Yaliwal =

- Village
- Location in Karnataka, India Yaliwal (India)
- Coordinates: 14.58266°N 75.45931°E
- Country: India
- State: Karnataka
- District: Dharwad
- Talukas: Kundgol

Government
  - Type: Panchayat raj
  - Body: Gram panchayat

Population (2011)
  - Total: 5,212

Languages
  - Official: Kannada
- Time zone: UTC+5:30 (IST)
- PIN: 581207
- ISO 3166 code: IN-KA
- Vehicle registration: KA
- Website: karnataka.gov.in

Yaliwal is a village in the southern state of Karnataka, India. It is located in the Kundgol taluk of Dharwad district in Karnataka.

== Demographics ==
As of the 2011 Census of India there were 1,021 households in Yaliwal and a total population of 5,212 consisting of 2,723 males and 2,489 females. There were 548 children ages 0–6.

== See also ==
- Haveri
- Districts of Karnataka
