= Kunku =

1937 Indian film by V. Shantaram

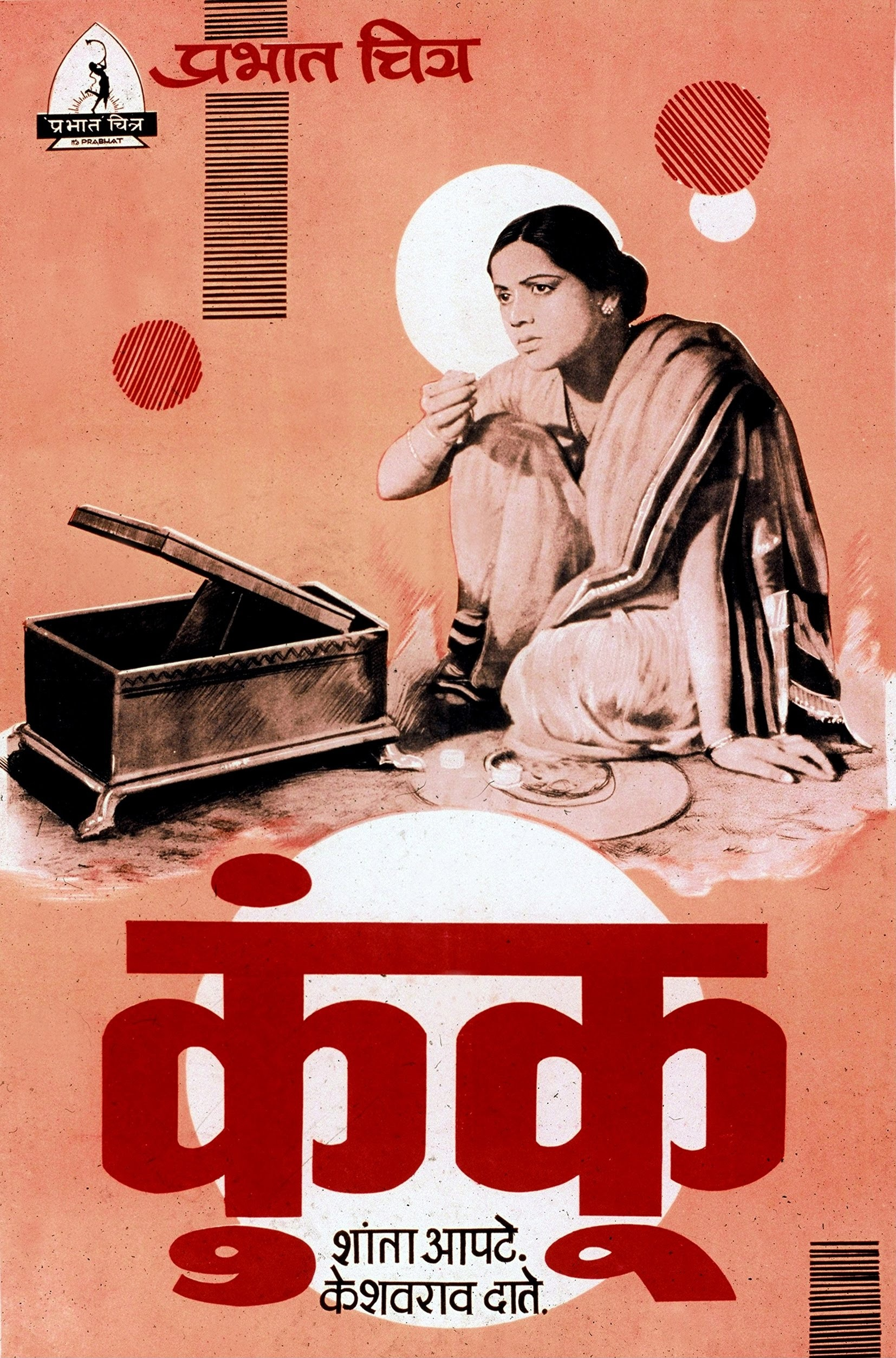
- Poster
- Directed by: V. Shantaram
- Written by: Narayan Hari Apte (novel & screenplay); Munshi Aziz (dialogue)
- Produced by: Prabhat Film Company
- Starring: Shanta Apte, Keshavrao Date, Raja Nene, Vimala Vasishta, Shakuntala Paranjpye, Master Chhotu
- Cinematography: V. Avadhoot
- Music by: Keshavrao Bhole
- Release date: 1937
- Running time: 154 minutes
- Country: British Raj
- Languages: Marathi; Hindi

Duniya Na Mane (Hindi version)

Kunku (Marathi version)

Kunku (Marathi title) is a 1937 Indian Marathi-language classic social drama film directed by V. Shantaram, who also wrote film's screenplay, based on the novel Na Patnari Goshta by Narayan Hari Apte. The film was simultaneously shot and released in Hindi as Duniya Na Maane.

The film went on to become both a critical and commercial success, and was shown at the Venice International Film Festival. The film is now hailed for "its daring attack on the treatment of women in Indian society." and depiction of child marriage.

For film's lead actress, Shanta Apte, it was third most memorable performance in a row, after Shantaram's previous classics, Amrit Manthan (1934) and Amar Jyoti (1936). Besides other songs, she also sang a full-fledged English song in the film: "A Psalm of Life", written by Henry Wadsworth Longfellow (1807–1882).

== Plot ==
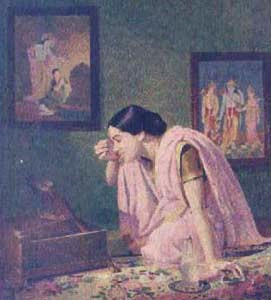
Duniya Na Mane (Hindi)

A young woman, Nirmala (Shanta Apte), known affectionately as Neera, is orphaned and comes to live in the house of her maternal uncle. His wife, a very good lady, urges her husband to do his duty and arrange for Nirmala to marry a suitable young man. The uncle finally brings a family to meet his niece, consisting of a handsome young man, his much younger brother, his middle aged father and his widowed aunt (father's sister). The meeting is cordial, and a few days later, Nirmala's uncle comes home with the news that the boy's family have agreed to the match. On the day of the wedding, while Nirmala sits inside a room like a demure bride, her aunt is at the gate to receive the groom with aarti. She is horrified and faints when she discovers that the elderly father is the groom! When she recovers, her husband tells her sternly not to make a scene but to ensure that Nirmala goes quietly with her husband, the much older widower, Kaka Saheb (Keshavrao Date).

The story is based on a novel by Shri. Narayan Hari Apte. It reminds us instinctively of the story of Sharada, a play by Deval which had long been a classic of Marathi theatre. Neera, a young girl, is married off to an old widower by her foster-parents, an uncle and his orthodox wife. The deal is obviously motivated by considerations of money. The shock of the marriage is too much for the girl, but she bravely tries to accommodate herself in the house. The widower deceives himself into believing that he is still not old enough to have lost his manhood. His college-going son tries to flirt with his young stepmother, while a widowed daughter of his sympathises with her in her woe. The marriage does not work. Some cheer is added to Neera's life through the company of a teenage girl belonging to the household. However, when the old man fully realises the implications of his action, he commits suicide, leaving the girl he has married against her will to go her own way.

== Music ==
The songs are from the lead actress Shanta Apte even sung. Shantaram Athavale wrote the lyrics to the music of Keshavrao Bhole. The English text of the song in the world's broad field of battle ... Be not like dumb, driven cattle is a poem by Henry Wadsworth Longfellow.

== Cast ==
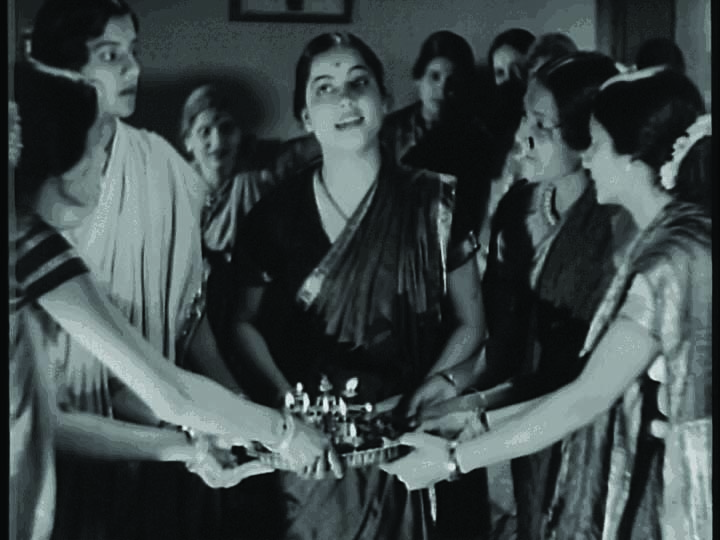
A scene from the film. Apte is seen in the centre.

- Shanta Apte as Meera/ Nirmala
- Keshavrao Date as Kakasaheb
- Raja Nene as Jugal
- Vimala Vasishta as the Aunt
- Shakuntala Paranjpye as Sushila
- Master Chhotu as Mama
- Gauri as Mami
- Vasanti as Shanta
