= Ram Jagannath Joshi =

Marathi poet (1762–1812)

Ramchandra Jagannath Joshi (1762–1812), commonly known as Ram Joshi or Solapurkar Ram Joshi, was a prominent shahir (ballad poet) and kirtankar who lived during the Peshwa period. Originally known for his work as a Tamasha artist and composer of romantic lavani poetry, he later devoted himself to religious studies, spiritual poetry, and delivering kirtans. He was known for his works in Lavani, Powada, and Tamasha genre.

== Early life and background ==
Ramchandra Jagannath Joshi was born in Solapur. His family's original surname was Tase; however, because his family engaged in traditional priesthood (bhikshuki), the surname Tase fell out of use over time and was permanently replaced by Joshi. His father, Jagannath, and his uncle, Anant, were both scholars of Vedic scriptures (Vedashastrasampanna) and were well-respected in society.

Following his father's death, Ram Joshi was raised by his elder brother, Mudgalbhat. Mudgalbhat carried on the traditional priestly duties, performed katha-kirtan, and recited stories from the Puranas. Mudgalbhat wished for Ram Joshi to also perform kirtans, religious discourses (pravachan), and priesthood to maintain the family's reputation. However, Ram Joshi was rebellious and headstrong from childhood. Despite being intelligent and talented, he fell into the company of Tamasha performers (tamasgirs). He dropped out of school and spent his time practicing music (riyaaz) and taking meals at the house of a shahir named Dhondiba. When Mudgalbhat tried to discipline him, Ram Joshi severed ties with his brother and openly joined a Tamasha troupe.

== Career in Tamasha ==
At the beginning of his artistic career, Ram Joshi composed lavani poems for Shahir Dhondiba. Later, he began producing and performing in his own Tamasha shows, eventually gaining fame as a prominent tamasgir shahir. Although he acquired considerable wealth and reputation, he was unable to retain his fortune due to a luxurious lifestyle and vices, which eventually left him destitute.

== Spiritual career and later life ==
Filled with remorse over his situation, Ram Joshi traveled to Pandharpur to pursue religious studies under the guidance of Baba Padhye. He studied there attentively for several years, becoming a proficient kirtankar and reciter of Puranic texts (puranik), before returning to Solapur. Upon his return, he began reciting Puranic stories in a temple in Solapur and subsequently started performing kirtans. He spent the remainder of his life traveling across Maharashtra to deliver kirtan performances. During his travels, he composed several notable lavanis describing sacred sites, including Pandharpur Varnan, Tuljapur Varnan, and Girichya Venkateshache Varnan.

== Literary style ==
Ram Joshi is primarily recognized as a shringarkavi (a poet of erotic and romantic themes). His lavanis are noted for literary features such as similes (upama), subtle imagery (taral kalpana), and alliteration (anupras). His spiritual poetic works were composed later in his life, after he abandoned his involvement in Tamasha.
