= Amar Jyoti =

1936 film

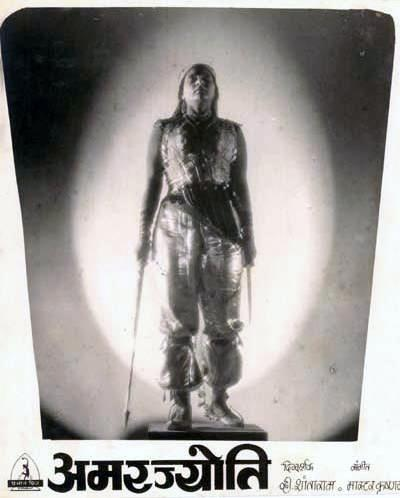
- Directed by: V. Shantaram
- Written by: K. Narayan Kale
- Produced by: Prabhat Film Company
- Starring: Durga Khote; Chandra Mohan; Shanta Apte; Nandrekar
- Cinematography: V. Avadhoot
- Music by: Master Krishnarao
- Production company: Prabhat Film Company
- Release date: 1936
- Running time: 166 minutes
- Country: India
- Language: Hindi

Amar Jyoti

Amar Jyoti (Eternal Flame) is a 1936 Hindi social, action adventure, drama film directed by V. Shantaram. Produced by Prabhat Film Company and cited as a "noteworthy" film along with Shantaram's earlier Amrit Manthan (1934), the film had actress Durga Khote performing one of her most "memorable" roles. K. Narayan Kale wrote the story with dialogues by Narottam Vyas. The music was composed by Master Krishnarao. The director of photography was V. Avadhoot, and the cast included Durga Khote, Chandra Mohan, Shanta Apte, Nandrekar, Vasanti and Narayan Kale.

The film was about a "rebellious female pirate". The story's social relevance in the form of a costume action adventure involved a queen who becomes a pirate when she faces extreme "patriarchal laws" and is denied custody of her son.

== Plot ==
Saudamini (Durga Khote) is denied custody of her son by the Queen (Karuna Devi) and the tyrannical Minister of Justice Durjaya (Chandra Mohan) after she separates from her husband. Durjaya tells her that a woman is the slave of her husband and essentially has no rights. This enrages Saudamini, and she vows vengeance and becomes a pirate. She and her pirates capture a ship which is supposed to be carrying the princess Nandini (Shanta Apte). However, she finds her old enemy Durjaya on board and takes him prisoner, cutting off one of his legs. Nandini has been hiding in a chest, and when she comes out of it, the imprisoned Durjaya sees her. He falls in love with her and offers her his food. Nandini, however, falls in love with a young shepherd boy Sudhir (Nandrekar). When she meets Saudamini and her helper Rekha (Vasanti), she joins them as a pirate and tells Sudhir off. Durjaya escapes with the help of Sudhir and arrives to arrest Saudamini. Saudamini is captured, but the others, along with Nandini and Rekha, escape. It is finally revealed that Sudhir is Saudamini's long-lost son. Nandini and Sudhir marry, and Rekha carries forward Saudamini's legacy.

== Cast ==
- Durga Khote as Soudamini
- Shanta Apte as Nandini
- Vasanti as Rekha
- Karunadevi as Queen
- Chandra Mohan as Durjaya, Minister of Justice
- B.Nandrekar as Sudheer
- S.K.Kulkarni as Kundan
- K.Narain Kale as Shekhar
- Gajendra as Gajendra

== Review and Box office ==
The film has been cited as a "great film", an "outstanding film", an "adventure classic" and the first Indian film screened at the Venice Film Festival.

The film became a big success at the box office with three main reasons cited for this achievement. The first was Durga Khote as the pirate Saudamini, leaving an impact on the audiences, where she excelled in her role. The second reason for the success of the film is attributed to the special effects. The third was the music and the songs.

== Soundtrack ==
The film's music director was Krishnarao Phulambrikar, who is stated as setting up the "Maharashtra School of Hindi Film Music". The composer employed the one-hundred-year tradition of "Maharashtra Natak Sangeet", blending it with Hindustani music in the form of "duets, ghazal and marching songs". One of the noteworthy songs was "Suno Suno Ban Ke Praani", sung by Shanta Apte, where her voice was commended for its naturalness. The other was "Aaj Humen Ban Behad Bhata", a duet by Shanta Apte and Nandrekar, both of which still "remain favourites among old numbers". The title song is cited as Shantaram's "classic number".

=== Song list ===
#	Title	Singer
1	"Akhiyan Ke Tum Taare Piyare"	Vasanti
2	"Aaj Humen Ban Behad Bhata"	B.Nandrekar, Shanta Apte
3	"Ab Maine Jaana Hai Haay Prem Kya Hai"	Shanta Apte
4	"Bhool Ja Bhool Ja"	Vasant Desai
5	"Jeet Jyoti Tej Chamak Raha Hai"	Durga Khote
6	"Kaaraj Ki Jyot Sada Hi Jale"	Vasant Desai
7	"Karate Rahana Masmar"	Vasanti, Durga Khote
8	"Yeh Jogan Khojan Nikri Hai"	Vasanti
9	"Kehti Kaliyan Rasbhari"	
10	"Mere Prabhuji Mat Bilmaoji"	
11	"Suno Suno Ban Ban Ke Praani"	Shanta Apte
