= Prabhat Film Company =

Indian film production company based in Kolhapur

Prabhat Chitra
- Type: Private
- Industry: Indian Film industry, Entertainment
- Founded: 1 June 1929; 97 years ago
- Founder: Vishnupant Govind Damle, V. Shantaram, S Fatelal, Keshav Rao Dhaibar, Seetaram Kulkarni
- Defunct: 13 October 1953; 73 years ago
- Headquarters: Kolhapur, Pune, India (1933 onwards)
- Key people: V. Shantaram
- Services: Filmmaking
- Website: www.prabhatfilm.com

Prabhat Film Company (popularly known as Prabhat Films) was an Indian film production company and studio facility founded in 1929 in Kolhapur. It was established by filmmaker V. Shantaram, along with Vishnupant Govind Damle, Keshav Rao Dhaibar, S. Fatelal, and S. V. Kulkarni. The company gained prominence during the transition from silent films to talkies and was recognised for its technical excellence and socially conscious storytelling.

In 1933, the company moved to Pune, where it established its own studio. Over 24 years, Prabhat Films produced 45 films in Marathi and Hindi. During the advent of talkies in India, Prabhat Films, along with Kolkata's New Theatres, stood out for its artistic achievements and socially relevant themes. Some of its notable productions include Kunku (released in Hindi as Duniya Na Mane), Swarajyacha Toran (also called Udaykal), based on the life of Shivaji, Dharmatma on Saint Eknath, Sant Tukaram on the eponymous saint-poet and social reformer, Shejari (released in Hindi as Padosi), addressing communal harmony, Manoos (also called Aadmi), tackling alcoholism, and Amar Jyoti, advocating women's emancipation.

Today, the former premises of Prabhat Film Company in Pune houses the Film and Television Institute of India (FTII). The site also features the Prabhat Museum, which showcases artifacts, original contracts, costumes, props, equipment, posters, and stills from the company's history. Additionally, the University of Chicago Library holds a collection of 27 films produced by Prabhat Film Company between 1932 and 1949.

== History ==
Baburao Painter's Maharashtra Film Company, based in Kolhapur, had made a name for itself with its silent films in early 1920s. Close friends Vishnupant G Damle and Fateh Lal (Damle Mama and Saheb Mama) were very good artists and held posts with senior responsibility at the company.

Baburao Pendharkar became the de facto head of operations because of Baburao Painter's distaste for financial matters. Pendharkar's cousin Shantaram Vanakudre (V. Shantaram) joined the company and became Baburao Painter's right-hand man.

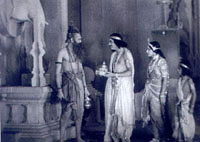
Ayodhyecha Raja (1932), the first Marathi film, was made by Prabhat Films

In 1927–1928, the senior personnel became dissatisfied by Baburao Painter's increasingly lukewarm and erratic behaviour. Damle and Fateh Lal were thinking of starting their own company, as were V. Shantaram and Keshav Rao Dhaibar. The four of them got together, and with Sitaram Kulkarni, well-established jeweller in Kolhapur as their fifth partner and financier, started a new company on 1 June 1929, with an initial investment amount of Rs 15,000. Baburao Pendharkar suggested the name Prabhat (meaning "Dawn"), and the other partners liked it.

Prabhat soon made a name for itself with silent films and produced six films, most of them directed by the tireless V. Shantaram. When India entered the era of talkies with Alam Ara in March 1931, Shantaram predicted that it was a transient phase, and the silent films were the real artistic area. But soon the company realized its mistake, and joined the talkie era with Ayodhyecha Raja (The King of Ayodhya) in Marathi (1932), also starring Durga Khote, which was the first film of Marathi Cinema, and later made under the name Ayodhya Ka Raja in Hindi. The film is based on Raja Harishchandra's story. In the 1930s, when most of silent movies companies had closed down, Prabhat joined the ranks of "big three" of Indian cinema, which included New Theatres of Calcutta and Bombay Talkies of Mumbai

In September 1933, the company moved to Pune because of its proximity to Mumbai and all five founder moved with their families, and the doors of the studio finally opened in Pune in 1934. Then followed a golden era of 8–10 years during which the company made some landmark films: Sairandhri (1933), India's first colour film, processed and printed in Germany; Amrit Manthan (1934), Sant Tukaram (1936), Kunku (or Duniya Na Mane in Hindi) in 1937, Manoos (or Aadmi in Hindi) (1939), Shejari (or Padosi) in 1941. The biopic, title Sant Tukaram, in 1936, made by V. Damle and S. Fattelal of Prabhat Film Company and starring Vishnupant Pagnis as the lead, and released on 12 December 1936 at Central Cinema in Mumbai. The film was not only a big hit but also had won an award at the fifth Venice International Film Festival in 1937, and still remains a part of film appreciation courses. Prabhat Films also pressed their film music on the Young India Record label.

After Shantaram split away in 1942 to form his own "Rajkamal Kalamandir" studios, and Damle Mama fell ill, the company encountered hard times. People associated with the studio, such as G. Kamble a noted painter, were lured away by Shantaram. Its last major film was Ram Shastri in 1944. Noted director, Guru Dutt started his career as a choreographer, under a three-year contract with the Prabhat Film Company in Pune in 1944. The company was closed in the early 1950s and property auctioned away in 1952. The company formally closed on 13 October 1953.

Major figures associated with Prabhat were composers Govindrao Tembe, Dinkar D. Patil, Keshavrao Bhole, Master Krishnarao, Vasant Desai; actresses Durga Khote, Shanta Apte, Shanta Hublikar, Vasanti, Jayashree Kamulkar; actors Bal Gandharva, Keshavrao Date, Shahu Modak. Other Marathi film companies of note in the 1930s included Saraswati Movietone, Shalini Movietone, Hans Pictures. Major film directors : Bhalji (Bhal G) Pendharkar, Master Vinayak. Major music directors : Annasaheb Mainkar, Dhamman Khan, Dada Chandekar.

A number of notable Hindi film personalities were also associated with Prabhat Films, including Guru Dutt, Dev Anand and Rehman.

== Legacy ==
- The Pune premises of Prabhat Studios are today a declared heritage site.
- The Film and Television Institute of India (FTII) today occupies the Pune premises of Prabhat Studio in 1960. Students of FTII continue to use the studio premises.
- The road starting from Deccan Corner and ending at Law College Road in Pune is named 'Prabhat Road' because of the location of Prabhat Studios.

Later, Anantrao Damle, V G Damle's son, bought back the company's film prints from Mudaliyar of Chennai, who said he was happy to return to Maharashtra its treasures. Damle's sons have followed up his good work and brought out some of Prabhat's vintage films on VCDs, and songs from several Prabhat Films on audio CDs. However, in January 2003, most of the original nitrates of the films, stored at the FTII cold-storage were destroyed in a fire while waiting to be transferred to National Film Archives storage.

The 75th anniversary of Prabhat Films was celebrated in Pune, in June 2004. It included an exhibition of rare photographs and screening of the documentary film, It's Prabhat!.

== Filmography ==
=== Silent films ===
- Gopal Krishna (1929)
- Khooni Khanjar (1930)
- Rani Saheba (1930)
- Udaykal (1930)
- Chandrasena (1931)
- Zulum (1931)

=== Talkies ===
- Ayodhyecha Raja (1932)
- Maya Machhindra (1932)
- Agnikankan: Branded Oath(1932)
- Sinhagad (1933)
- Sairandhri (1933)
- Amrit Manthan (1934)
- Dharmatma (1935)
- Chandrasena (1935)
- Amar Jyoti (1936)
- Sant Tukaram (1936)
- Rajput Ramani (1936)
- Kunku (1937)
- Duniya Na Mane (1937)
- Mera Ladka (1938)
- Gopal Krishna (1938)
- Manoos (1939)
- Aadmi (1939)
- Sant Dnyaneshwar (1940)
- Beyond the Horizon
- Padosi (1941)
- Das Baje (1942) also called 10 O'Clock
- Ramshastri (1944)
- Chand (1944)
- Aparadhi (1949)
- Hum Ek Hain (1946 film - Debut film of Dev Anand)
- Aage Badho (1946)(starring Dev Anand)
