= Govindrao Tembe =

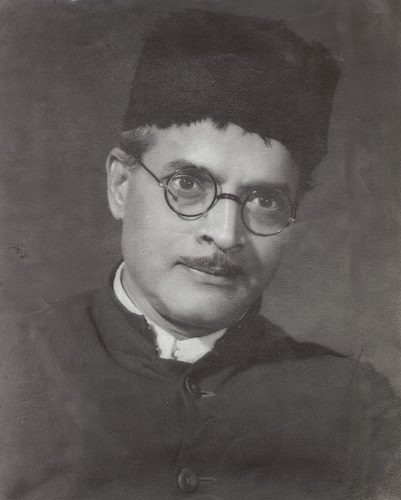
- Govindrao Tembe

Background information
- Born: 5 June 1881
- Died: 9 October 1955 (aged 74)
- Genre: Hindustani classical music
- Occupation: Harmonium Player
- Instrument: Harmonium

Govind Sadashiv Tembe, popularly known as Govindrao Tembe (5 June 1881 – 9 October 1955), was a harmonium player, stage actor, and music composer.

== Early life and background ==
He grew up in Kolhapur and became attached to music early in life. He was largely self-taught as a harmonium player. He has acknowledged the debt of Deval Club for his initial forays into Hindustani classical music.

Tembe learnt his art from Bhaskarbuwa Bakhale and, although he never received direct guidance from Alladiya Khan of Jaipur Gharana, Tembe considered Khansaheb as his guru.

== Career ==
He used to accompany Pt. Bhaskarbuwa Bakhale, and would also often perform solo, but later gave up harmonium for most part of his career.

He composed music for the drama Manapman in 1910, and also for the first Marathi talkie Ayodhyecha Raja (1932). He also acted in both these productions.

He was a personal friend of Late Yuvaraja of Mysore, HH Sri. Kanteerva Narasimha Raja Wadiyar. Prof. Tembe was part of a large entourage of Yuvaraja during his trip to Europe in 1939. The Troupe performed before the Pope and at other places during this trip. As World War II broke out, they stayed at London for a long time and ultimately returned in January 1940 but Yuvaraja died soon at his Palace Anchorage (next to Hotel Taj) in March 1940 and Prof. Tembe lost his patron.

He was part-owner of Gandharva Natak Mandali when it was formed in 1913. Two years later, he started his own company named Shivraj Natak Mandali. He wrote dramas and also the padas (songs) in them.

Pandit Purshottam Walawalkar is the disciple of Govindrao Tembe.
