= Keshavrao Bhole =

Indian musician (1896–1967)

Keshav Vaman Bhole
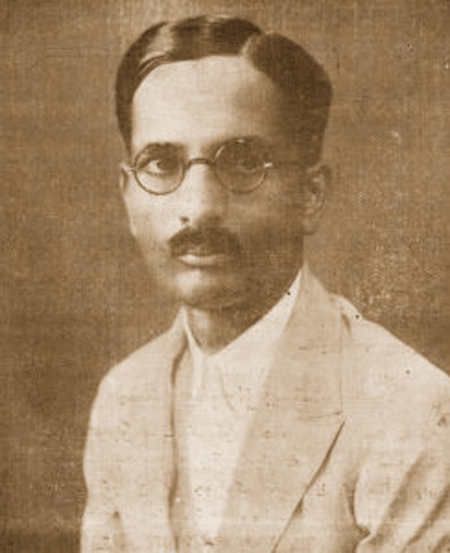
- Born: 23 May 1896; Amravati, Maharashtra, British India
- Died: 9 November 1977 (aged 81); Pune, Maharashtra, India
- Occupation: Music composer
- Spouse: Jyotsna Keshav Bhole

Keshav Vaman Bhole (23 May 1896 – 9 November 1977), also known as Keshavrao Bhole, was an Indian music composer, critic, and music director. He is known for his association with the Prabhat Film Company and for his writings on music theory and practitioners.

== Early life and background ==
Keshav Vaman Bhole was born on 23 May 1896 in Amravati, Maharashtra, into a family of music enthusiasts. His father, Vamanrao, was a player of the satar, though he died before Bhole was born. Bhole's mother was a skilled singer. Despite the loss of his father, the musical environment of his household fostered an early interest in the arts.

During his childhood, Bhole began his musical education by listening to gramophone records. He considered the singer Goharjan to be his "mental teacher" and also studied the songs of Bai Johrabai. He received formal guidance from his elder brother, the playwright Vasudev Bhole, who instructed him on the nuances of performance, including the progression of ragas and the importance of clear pronunciation. Bhole was further influenced by the singing of Vishnu Digambar Paluskar.

== Career ==
Bhole moved to Mumbai to pursue doctoral studies. During his time there, he established a reputation as a singer, composer, and music critic. He was associated with notable vocalists such as Bal Gandharva and Manji Khan.

=== Theater and film ===
In the theater circuit, Bhole composed music for the play Andhalachi Shaala, produced by the theater company Natya-Manvantar.

In 1933, he joined the Prabhat Film Company as a music director. His filmography includes compositions for several productions, including:

- Amritmanthan
- Sant Tukaram
- Kunku
- Sant Gyaneshwar
- Chandrasena
- Maza Mulga
- Pahu Re Kiti Waat
- Sant Sakhu

Later in his career, he served as a music director for All India Radio (Aakashvani) at both the Mumbai and Pune stations.

== Literary works ==
Bhole was a prolific writer on the subject of music, often publishing under the pseudonyms "Ekalavya" and "Shuddhsarang". Under the name Ekalavya, he contributed articles regarding elite singers to the weekly publication Vasundhara. These columns were compiled into the book Today's Famous Singers (1933), which was later reissued as Sangitache Mankari (1949).

His other published works include:

- Awazachi Duniya (1948)
- Astaai (1962)
- Vasantkakachi Patre (1964)
- Maze Sangeet (1964)
- Antra (1967)
- Je Athavate Te (1972)

== Personal life ==
While living in Mumbai, he married Durgabai Kelekar, who was originally from Goa. She later became known as Jyotsna Bhole. Keshav Vaman Bhole died in Pune on 9 November 1977.
