= V. Shantaram =

Indian film director, producer, screenwriter, and actor (1901–1990)

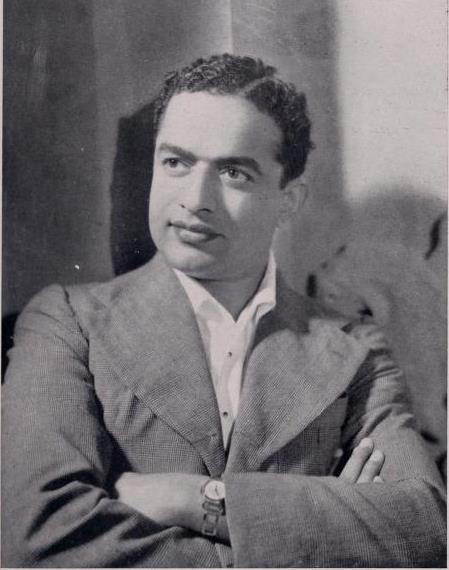
- Shantaram in 1938
- Born: Shantaram Rajaram Vankudre; 18 November 1901; Kolhapur, Kolhapur State, British India
- Died: 30 October 1990 (aged 88); Mumbai, Maharashtra, India
- Other names: Annasaheb, Shantaram Bapu
- Occupations: Film Director; Film Producer; Screenwriter; Actor; Editor
- Years active: 1921–1987
- Spouses: Vimalabai (m. 1921) Jayashree (m. 1941; div. 1956) Sandhya (m. 1956)
- Children: 7 (including, Rajshree & Kiran Shantaram)
- Awards: Dadasaheb Phalke Award; 1985; Padma Vibhushan; 1992

V. Shantaram (born Shantaram Rajaram Vankudre; Marathi: [ʋiː ʃaːn̪t̪aɾaːm]; 18 November 1901 – 30 October 1990), also known as Shantaram Bapu, was an Indian film director, producer, screenwriter, actor and editor known for his work in Hindi and Marathi films. Widely regarded as one of the pioneers of Indian cinema, he was known for his socially conscious films, innovative filmmaking techniques and experimentation with colour, sound and cinematography. He is best known for films such as Dr. Kotnis Ki Amar Kahani (1946), Amar Bhoopali (1951), Jhanak Jhanak Payal Baaje (1955), Do Aankhen Barah Haath (1957), Navrang (1959), Duniya Na Mane (1937), Pinjara (1972), Chaani, Iye Marathiche Nagari and Zunj.

Shantaram began his career as an actor and technician at the Maharashtra Film Company in Kolhapur before co-founding the Prabhat Film Company in 1929 with V. G. Damle, Sheikh Fatelal, K. R. Dhaiber and S. B. Kulkarni. He directed several influential films for Prabhat, including Ayodhyecha Raja (1932), one of the earliest Marathi talkies, and Kunku (1937), which was released in Hindi as Duniya Na Mane. In 1942, he founded Rajkamal Kalamandir, through which he produced and directed several notable films.

Among his best-known works are Sant Tukaram (1936), Manoos (1939), Shejari (1941), Dr. Kotnis Ki Amar Kahani (1946), Jhanak Jhanak Payal Baaje (1955), Do Ankhen Barah Haath (1957), Navrang (1959), Stree (1961) and Pinjara (1972). His films frequently addressed social issues, including caste, gender inequality, rehabilitation and the position of women in society. He received numerous honours for his contribution to Indian cinema, including the Dadasaheb Phalke Award in 1985. He was also awarded the Padma Vibhushan, India's second-highest civilian honour, in 1992, posthumously. He also received many major awards in his career, including five National Film Awards and a Golden Globes.

== Early life ==
Shantaram in 1940

V. Shantaram was born on 18 November 1901 in Kolhapur, then a princely state in British India, to Rajaram and Kamalabai Vankudre. He was the second of five sons. His father ran a small grocery shop and also supplemented the family's income by renting Petromax lamps to musical theatre companies. The family had limited financial means. His father was a Marathi Jain Kasar and mother a Hindu

Shantaram received his early education in Kolhapur. He was enrolled at Harihar Vidyalaya at the age of five and later continued his schooling at another local school. He was not particularly interested in conventional studies, although he showed an aptitude for drawing and languages. He completed his primary education but did not pursue higher formal education.

The cultural environment of Kolhapur influenced Shantaram during his childhood. He was exposed to Marathi musical theatre, including the performances of Bal Gandharva, as well as Indian and Western music. His early interest in the performing arts eventually led him towards cinema. Because of the family's financial circumstances, Shantaram began working at a young age. After the family moved to Hubballi, he worked at a railway workshop as a manual labourer. He also worked at a local cinema, where his duties included various odd jobs and serving as a doorkeeper. His exposure to films, including the works of Dadasaheb Phalke, strengthened his interest in filmmaking.

Shantaram was maternal cousin of famous Marathi film director Master Vinayak, (father of Bollywood actress Nanda) as well as Baburao Pendharkar and Bhalji Pendharkar. He used to live at Panhala near Kolhapur in Maharashtra state before moving to Pune and then ultimately Bombay.

== Career ==
=== Early career & Prabhat Film Company ===
Shantaram third from the left

V. Shantaram began his career in the early 1920s at the Maharashtra Film Company in Kolhapur, founded by filmmaker Baburao Painter. He initially worked in various technical and production roles before making his acting debut in the silent film Surekha Haran in 1921. He directed his first film Netaji Palkar, in 1927. In 1929, Shantaram co-founded the Prabhat Film Company with Vishnupant Damle, Sheikh Fatelal, K. R. Dhaiber and S. B. Kulkarni. The studio became one of the major film production companies of the period. Shantaram directed several films for Prabhat and increasingly used cinema to address social and cultural issues.

During his tenure at Prabhat Film Company, He developed a filmmaking style that combined technical experimentation with socially relevant and reformist themes. His films moved beyond mythological and historical subjects to address issues such as religious orthodoxy, caste, gender inequality, communal harmony and the treatment of marginalised sections of society. Chandrasena (1931) was among his early directorial works at Prabhat and reflected the studio's experimentation during the transition from silent cinema to sound. It was followed by Ayodhyecha Raja (1932), based on the story of King Harishchandra. The film is regarded as the first Marathi talkie and marked an important stage in the development of Marathi-language sound cinema. With Sairandhri (1933), Shantaram experimented with colour cinematography. The film was processed in Germany using the Agfa colour process, although the original colour print is no longer known to survive. Amrit Manthan (1934), set against the backdrop of religious orthodoxy and reform, examined the conflict between superstition and rational thought. The film was also notable for its visual treatment and use of close-ups.

Shantaram continued exploring social themes with Jambu Kaka (1935) and Amar Jyoti (1936). Amar Jyoti, starring Durga Khote, centred on a woman who challenges patriarchal authority and established social conventions. The film also demonstrated Shantaram's growing interest in strong female protagonists and visually elaborate filmmaking. In 1936, he co-directed Sant Tukaram with Vishnupant Damle and Sheikh Fattelal. Based on the life of the Marathi saint-poet Tukaram, the film combined devotional themes with an emphasis on equality and humanism. It received international recognition and was screened at the Venice International Film Festival, where it received an award and became one of the earliest Indian films to gain significant recognition at an international film festival.

Kunku (1937), released in Hindi as Duniya Na Mane, dealt with the social consequences of child marriage and the position of women within a patriarchal society. The film's treatment of its female protagonist and its criticism of oppressive social customs established Shantaram's reputation for using popular cinema as a vehicle for social commentary. Manoos (1939), released in Hindi as Aadmi, addressed the relationship between a police officer and a woman working as a prostitute. Rather than portraying its characters through conventional moral judgments, the film explored questions of compassion, rehabilitation and social prejudice. He was praised by Charlie Chaplin for his Marathi film Manoos. Chaplin reportedly liked the film to a great extent. It was followed by Shejari (1941), released in Hindi as Padosi, which dealt with communal harmony through the friendship between a Hindu and a Muslim. The film's message of communal unity became particularly significant in the social and political climate of the period. These films established Shantaram as one of the leading filmmakers associated with Prabhat Film Company and demonstrated his characteristic combination of entertainment, technological experimentation and social themes.

=== Rajkamal Mandir ===
Shantaram left Prabhat Film Company in 1942. The studio subsequently declined and was eventually wound up. After leaving Prabhat, Shantaram established Rajkamal Kalamandir in Bombay in the same year. His first production under the banner was Shakuntala (1943). The studio subsequently became one of the prominent film production centres in India.

He continued to combine entertainment with social themes through films such as Dr. Kotnis Ki Amar Kahani (1946), Dahej (1950) and Teen Batti Char Raasta (1953). Dr. Kotnis Ki Amar Kahani, based on the life of Indian physician Dwarkanath Kotnis, depicted his service in China during the Second Sino-Japanese War and incorporated a single-shot sequence as part of its visual storytelling. Dahej dealt with the social problem of dowry and its consequences for women and families, while Teen Batti Char Raasta explored social divisions and cultural differences through the lives of people from different communities. These films continued Shantaram's approach of using popular cinema to address contemporary social issues while experimenting with cinematic form.

Shantaram also directed and produced Marathi-film Lokshahir Ram Joshi in 1947, based on the life of the poet and tamasha performer Ram Joshi, was initially assigned to Baburao Painter. Shantaram subsequently completed the film after Painter fell ill during production. The film was written by G. D. Madgulkar and starred Jayaram Shiledar and Hansa Wadkar. It was released in both Marathi and Hindi versions and became one of the major post-war successes in Marathi cinema. The film's use of lavani and tamasha performances contributed to the popularity of the tamasha genre in Marathi cinema.

=== Critical and commercial success ===
Shantaram at the set of Manoos

The 1950s marked one of the most successful periods of Shantaram's career. In 1951, He directed Amar Bhoopali (1951), a Marathi biographical film based on the life of poet and lavani performer Honaji Bala. The film starred Panditrao Nagarkar, Sandhya and Lalita Pawar, with music composed by Vasant Desai. It was selected for the 1952 Cannes Film Festival and competed in the feature-film section. The film's sound recording received the Grand Prix Technique at Cannes, giving Shantaram international recognition for his technical work.

Jhanak Jhanak Payal Baaje (1955), a dance-oriented film starring Sandhya and himself, became a major success and received several honours, including the President's Silver Medal and the Filmfare Award for Best Director for Shantaram. He followed it with Do Ankhen Barah Haath (1957), a socially themed drama about the rehabilitation of prisoners. The film received the President's Gold Medal for the All India Best Feature Film and became one of the most acclaimed works of his career. It won a Silver Bear at the 8th Berlin International Film Festival and a Golden Globe Award. Its song "Ae Malik Tere Bande Hum" subsequently became widely known and was adopted by several schools.

Shantaram continued his experimentation with colour and visual design in Navrang (1959), a film noted for its stylised treatment of dance, music and colour. His other productions during the period included Stree (1961) and Geet Gaya Patharon Ne (1964). Stree was selected as the Indian entry for the Best Foreign Language Film at the 34th Academy Awards, but was not accepted as a nominee. He introduced his daughter Rajshree and Jeetendra in the 1964 film Geet Gaya Patharon Ne.

=== Later career ===
After 1964, Shantaram continued to work primarily as a director and producer, making films in both Hindi and Marathi. Ladki Sahyadri Ki was released in 1966. It was followed by Boond Jo Ban Gayee Moti in 1967. In 1971, he made a film named Duniya Kya Jaane.

In 1972, Shantaram directed Pinjara, a Marathi-language musical drama featuring Sandhya and Shreeram Lagoo in the lead roles. The film was set against the backdrop of tamasha and depicted the relationship between a schoolteacher and a tamasha performer. The film received the National Film Award for Best Feature Film in Marathi and became one of the notable Marathi films of the period.

In 1975, he directed Chandanachi Choli Ang Ang Jali, a Marathi-language film starring Sandhya and Arun Sarnaik, introduced actress Ranjana Deshmukh to the screen. Ranjana was the niece of Sandhya, Shantaram's wife, and went on to become a prominent actress in Marathi cinema. In 1977, Shantaram directed and produced Chaani, a Marathi-language film based on the work of writer C. T. Khanolkar. The film starred Ranjana Deshmukh, Sushant Ray and Yashwant Dutt. Set on the Konkan coast, it centred on Chaani, a fisherwoman whose parentage becomes the subject of social prejudice and local rumours. Chaani was among Shantaram's final directorial films. By this stage of his career, his filmmaking became less frequent, although he continued to work through Rajkamal Kalamandir. His final film was Jhanjhaar, released in 1987. The Hindi-language film was starred Padmini Kolhapure and Rishi Kapoor. Following Jhanjhaar, Shantaram did not direct another feature film.

== Legacy ==
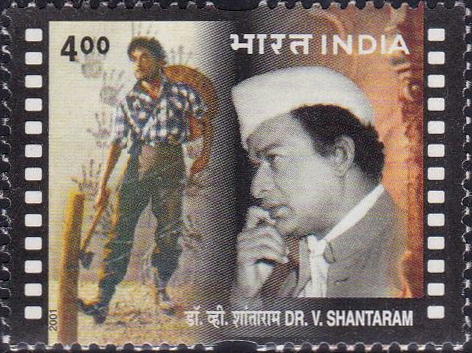
Shantaram on a 2001 stamp of India

Shantaram is regarded as one of the pioneers of Indian cinema and was among the filmmakers who helped shape the development of Marathi and Hindi cinema. His career spanned the transition from silent films to sound and colour, and his work combined technical experimentation with socially oriented subjects.

Shantaram's influence has been acknowledged by filmmakers and performers across generations. Filmmaker Shyam Benegal said that Shantaram was at his best when dealing with social issues, which he approached with sincerity and purpose, while also maintaining a strong understanding of his audience. Playback singer Lata Mangeshkar described him as an “excellent director” and particularly noted his understanding of music and his detailed approach to song picturisation. Actor Shreeram Lagoo, who worked with him in Pinjara, recalled his disciplined approach to filmmaking and the freedom he gave actors during performances.

Shantaram's work also influenced later generations of filmmakers. Satyajit Ray recalled being impressed by films from the Prabhat period, while Ashutosh Gowariker described Dr. Kotnis Ki Amar Kahani and Do Ankhen Barah Haath as “text-book” examples of good cinema. Manoj Kumar described Shantaram as an “excellent storyteller and technician” and identified him among the filmmakers who influenced his own work. Marathi filmmaker Jabbar Patel also recalled Shantaram's encouragement after he viewed Samna. Nana Patekar named Shantaram among the filmmakers he grew up watching, alongside Bimal Roy, Satyajit Ray and Ritwik Ghatak. Actor Tom Alter, who worked with Shantaram, described him, Raj Kapoor, Manoj Kumar and Subhash Ghai as “four of the pillars” of the Hindi film industry and credited their films with establishing a “commercial standard of cinematic excellence”. Alter also recalled Shantaram as disciplined and straightforward in his manner.

In Marathi cinema, actor Vikram Gokhale recalled growing up watching Shantaram's films when he received the V. Shantaram Lifetime Achievement Award in 2017. In 2025, actor-director Mahesh Manjrekar, while receiving the same award, said that Dadasaheb Phalke started Indian cinema and that Shantaram “took it forward”, and described receiving an award named after him as a major responsibility.

The Dadasaheb Phalke Award was conferred on him in 1985. He was posthumously awarded the Padma Vibhushan in 1992. His autobiography Shantarama was published in Hindi and Marathi. The V. Shantaram Lifetime Achievement Award and V. Shantaram Special Contribution Award was constituted by the Government of Maharashtra. The V. Shantaram Motion Picture Scientific Research and Cultural Foundation, established in 1993, offers various awards to film-makers. The award is presented annually on 18 November. A postage stamp dedicated to Shantaram was released by India Post on 17 November 2001.

Shantaram, fondly known as Annasaheb, had an illustrious career as a filmmaker for almost seven decades. He was one of the early filmmakers to realize the efficacy of the film medium as an instrument of social change and used it successfully to advocate humanism on one hand and expose bigotry and injustice on the other. V. Shantaram had a very keen interest in music. It is said that he "ghost wrote" music for many of his music directors, and took a very active part in the creation of music. Some of his songs had to be rehearsed several times before they were approved by V. Shantaram.

== Personal life ==
In 1921, aged 20, he married 12-year-old Vimalabai in a match arranged by their families. They had four children: son Prabhat Kumar (whom Shantaram named after his movie company) and daughters Saroj, Madhura and Charusheela. Saroj, the eldest daughter, is married to Soli Engineer, a Parsi, and they run the Grand Hotel in Mumbai and the Valley View Grand Resort at Panhala near Kolhapur, built on Shantaram's farmhouse, which was inherited by Saroj. Shantaram's second daughter, author Madhura, is the wife of Pandit Jasraj and mother of music director Shaarang Dev Pandit and of TV personality Durga Jasraj. Shantaram's third daughter, Charusheela, is the mother of former film actor Siddharth Ray.

In 1941, Shantaram married actress Jayashree (née Kamulkar), with whom he had worked in several films, including Shakuntala (1942). He had three children with Jayashree: a son, the Marathi film director and producer Kiran Shantaram, and two daughters, the actress Rajshree and Tejashree. The couple divorced in 1956.

In 1956, just before the law was changed to prohibit polygamy for Hindus, Shantaram married another of his leading ladies, the actress Sandhya (née Vijaya Deshmukh), who had starred in his films Amar Bhoopali and Parchaiyan and would go on to star in many of his future films like Do Aankhen Barah Haath, Jhanak Jhanak Payal Baaje, Navrang, Jal Bin Machhli Nritya Bin Bijli and Sehra. They did not have any children together.

== Death ==
Shantaram died on 28 October 1990 in Mumbai. He was survived by his three wives and seven children.

Vimalabai died in 2008 after being bedridden for four years. Jayashree died peacefully in her sleep in 2003. Sandhya (Vijaya Deshmukh) died in 2025.

== Awards and recognition ==
=== Recognition ===
- 2017 – on 18 November 2017, Google honored Shantaram on his 116th Birthday with a Google Doodle on their Indian front page.
- 1952 – Amar Bhoopali (The Immortal Song) competed at the 1952 Cannes Film Festival.

=== Awards ===
- 1952 Cannes Film Festival – Vulcan Award - Technical Grand Prize for Direction
- 1955 – All India Certificate of Merit for Best Feature Film – Jhanak Jhanak Payal Baaje
- 1955 – President's Silver Medal for Best Feature Film in Hindi – Jhanak Jhanak Payal Baaje
- 1957 – President's Gold Medal for the All India Best Feature Film – Do Aankhen Barah Haath
- 1957 – President's Silver Medal for Best Feature Film in Hindi – Do Aankhen Barah Haath
- 1957 – Filmfare Award for Best Director – Jhanak Jhanak Payal Baaje
- 1958 – Berlin International Film Festival, OCIC Award – Do Aankhen Barah Haath
- 1958 – Berlin International Film Festival, Silver Bear (Special Prize) – Do Aankhen Barah Haath
- 1959 - 16th Golden Globe Awards, Samuel Goldwyn International Film Award – Do Aankhen Barah Haath (won)
- 1985 – Dadasaheb Phalke Award
- 1992 – Padma Vibhushan (posthumous)

== In popular culture ==
V. Shantaram has been portrayed and commemorated in later popular culture. In December 2025, a biographical film based on his life was announced, with Siddhant Chaturvedi set to portray Shantaram. The film is written and directed by Abhijeet Shirish Deshpande and is being produced by Rahul Kiran Shantaram, Subhash Kale and Sarita Ashwin Varde. The first-look poster featuring Chaturvedi as Shantaram was released with the announcement.

== See also ==
- List of Indian winners and nominees of the Golden Globe Awards
- V. Shantaram Lifetime Achievement Award
- V. Shantaram Special Contribution Award

== Bibliographies ==
- Shantaram, Kiran & Narwekar, Sanjit; V Shantaram: The Legacy of the Royal Lotus, 2003, Rupa & Co., ISBN 978-81-291-0218-8.
- Banerjee, Shampa; Profiles, five film-makers from India: V. Shantaram, Raj Kapoor, Mrinal Sen, Guru Dutt, Ritwik Ghatak Directorate of Film Festivals, National Film Development Corp, 1985.
- Pandit Jasraj, Madhura, V. Shantaram: The Man Who Changed Indian Cinema, Hay House, 2015
