= Balgandharva (film) =

- Poster
- बालगंधर्व
- Directed by: Ravi Jadhav
- Written by: Abhiram Bhadkamkar
- Produced by: Nitin Chandrakant Desai
- Starring: Subodh Bhave; Vibhavari Deshpande; Prachiti Mhatre; Kishor Kadam; Avinash Narkar
- Cinematography: Mahesh Limaye
- Edited by: Prashant Khedekar
- Music by: Kaushal Inamdar
- Distributed by: Shringar Films
- Release date: 6 May 2011
- Running time: 124 minutes
- Country: India
- Language: Marathi
- Budget: ₹ 7 crores
- Box office: ₹ 19 crores

Balgandharva is a 2011 Indian Marathi-language biographical film on one of the Marathi singers and stage actors Narayan Shripad Rajhans, famously known as Bal Gandharva (Bal=child + Gandharva=Singer of Heaven). The name was bestowed to Narayan by Lokmanya Tilak after listening to his public performance in Pune while he was very young.

The film is directed by Ravi Jadhav, whose debutant film Natarang won critical acclaims as well as good box office report. The film is produced by Nitin Chandrakant Desai, the National Award-winning Art Director, under the banner of Iconic Chandrakant Productions Pvt. Ltd.

The film was declared "Super Hit" at the box-office.

== Plot ==
The film is a biopic on life on Balgandharva showing his struggles through poverty to riches and fame. Narayan Rajhans while in a public performance of his singing at Pune receives his new honour and name "Balgandharva". On advice of Shahu Maharaj, the king of Kolhapur state, he starts his formal training and joins Kirloskar Natak Mandali. Narayan wins claps of his audiences and becomes the key performer of all Sangeet Nataks. To please his insistent mother Narayan marries Laxmi. On the opening day (12 March 1911) of his play Sangeet Manapamaan, his infant daughter dies. But he goes ahead with the performance and enthralls the audience. Due to disputes in the company Narayan decides to start his own company named Gandharva Natak Mandali. Fully devoting himself towards his passion of drama and singing, he overlooks his family. Giving audience's satisfaction key priority he starts spending money without any considerations. He loses many of his friends because of his attitude. He blindly believes in Balasaheb Pandit, who keeps his company's accounts. Narayan's carefree nature results in his bankruptcy. Meeting Gohar Bai, who is his fan, he falls in love with her and leaves his wife and family. In his old age, he also loses the charm of holding audiences. When cinema is introduced, theatre fails to grab audiences. Balgandharva also signs a contract with V. Shantaram's Prabhat Film Company to act in films. Money in films would also reduce his economic burden. But he never likes the methodologies of film production and abandons it after only one film where he plays the lead role of Sant Eknath. Looking at his poverty many Royalties pay him honorary amounts in order to repay his debts. But he in turn donates this money to other charities.

== Cast ==
- Subodh Bhave as Narayan Shripad Rajhans/ Bal Gandharva
  - Atharva Karve as young Balgandharva
- Suhas Joshi as Narayan's mother
- Kishor Kadam as Ganpatrao Bodas
- Avinash Narkar as Balasaheb Pandit
- Sagar Talashikar as Nanasaheb Joglekar
- Omkar Kulkarni as V. Shantaram
- Anand Abhyankar as Mama
- Vibhavari Deshpande as Narayan's wife, Laxmi
- Prachiti Mhatre as Joharbai Karnataki
- Abhijit Kelkar as Sadubhau Ranade
- Rahul Deshpande as Keshavrao Bhosale (also known as Sangeet Surya)
- Rahul Solapurkar as Shahu Maharaj
- Swapnil Rajshekhar as Sayajirao Gaekwad III
- Mukesh Rishi as Pathan
- Manoj Kolhatkar as Ram Ganesh Gadkari (Gadkari Mastar)
- Angad Mhaskar as Anant Laxman Kanhere
- Vidyadhar Joshi as Shankarrao
- Siddharth Chandekar as Abhyankar
- Manoj Joshi as Seth Laxmichand Narayan
- Madhav Abhyankar as Pant from Bhor Province
- Nitin Chandrakant Desai as Bal Gangadhar Tilak

== Production ==
The mahurat shot of the film was done at the Bal Gandharva Rang Mandir, Pune; the place whose foundation stone was laid by Balgandharva. As the story is based in early 20th century Maharashtra, renowned historian Babasaheb Purandare, famous theatre actress of the yesteryears, Jaimala Shiledar along with her daughter Kirti Shiledar and historian Dr. Jaisingrao Pawar helped in consulting for the production. Multiple National Award winning costume designer Neeta Lulla designed the costumes and jewellery of the characters to recreate the era.

The film premiered in Mumbai on 4 May 2011 and on 5 May in Pune. It then released all over Maharashtra on 6 May.

== Awards and recognition ==
The film was screened at many film festivals around the globe, starting from the New York Indian Film Festival on 8 May 2011. Subsequently, it was also screened at the Cannes and Venice festivals.

The film also won maximum number of awards (3) at 59th National Film Awards in 2011.

National Film Awards

- 2011: National Film Award for Best Male Playback Singer - Anand Bhate

Citation: For taking up the challenge of recreating the ethos of a doyen like Bal Gandharva who strode the musical stage like a giant. He recreates the magic of the sonorous voice of Bal Gandharva in a flawless and distinguished manner thus helping preserve a tradition. The original voice of the actor and his voice blend seamlessly.

- 2011: National Film Award for Best Costume Design - Neeta Lulla (shared with Neharika Khan for The Dirty Picture)

Citation: For creating a period with appropriate costumes embellished with the right colors and textures. Neeta Lulla of 'Balgandharva' and Niharika Khan in 'The Dirty Picture’ have both done meticulous research into those times, not merely to be authentic but also to appropriately contextualize the respective narratives and their times.

- 2011: National Film Award for Best Make-up Artist - Vikram Gaikwad (also for The Dirty Picture)

Citation: For bringing to life the primary characters who propel the two films. He has especially worked on the transformations of the two characters as they journey towards their tragic fate. The makeup lends authenticity and highlights their emotional frailties thus raising the film to another temporal level.

== Soundtrack ==
Sound of Heaven: The Story of Balgandharva

Soundtrack album by Kaushal Inamdar
- Released: 25 April 2011
- Recorded: 2010–2011; Yash Raj Studio
- Genres: Natya Sangeet, feature film soundtrack
- Label: Saregama

The soundtrack of the film comprises 21 songs of which 16 feature in the film. The soundtrack was released on 25 April 2011 at a ceremony held at Rang Sharada Auditorium, Bandra.

Kaushal Inamdar is the music director of the film. To recreate the magic of Gandharva Music, the team invited Christian Howes, a Jazz Violinist to conduct the strings for "Nahi Me Bolat Natha", a legendary song of Bal Gandharva. The entire strings section was recorded by remote by Kaushal Inamdar from US and Spain. This is the first time the Marathi cinema has used a western artiste. Anand Bhate, also known as "Anand Gandharva", a Hindustani classical vocalist from Kirana Gharana has lent his voice for all songs for the lead character. Swanand Kirkire, the popular Hindi film lyricist known for his songs of Parineeta, 3 Idiots and Lage Raho Munna Bhai has penned lyrics of "Parvardigar", a qawwali and "Aaj Mhare Ghar Pavana", a bhajan.

The music was mixed in Yash Raj Studio and mastered in London. The music is released by Saregama. Following is the list of the tracks.

No.	Title	Lyrics	Music	Singer(s)	Length
1.	"Panchatund Nararundmaladhar †" (Originally featured in Sangeet Shakuntal (1880) (Sangeet Natak))	Annasaheb Kirloskar	Annasaheb Kirloskar	Anand Bhate and Chorus	4:56
2.	"Pariyeva Ke Payal Sajani †" (Classical Bandish)	Traditional	Traditional	Aarya Ambekar	3:12
3.	"Nahi Mi Bolat Natha †" (Originally featured in Sangeet Maanaapamaan (1911) (Sangeet Natak))	Krushnaji Prabhakar Khadilkar	Govindrao Tembe	Anand Bhate, Madhura Kumbhar	4:18
4.	"Mhatara Ituka Na †" (Originally featured in Sangeet Sharada (1899) (Sangeet Natak))	Govind Ballal Deval	Govind Ballal Deval	Rishikesh Kamerkar, Shrirang Bhave	4:06
5.	"Kashi Ya Tyaju Padala †" (Originally featured in Sangeet Ekach Pyala (1919) (Sangeet Natak))	Viththal Sitaram Gurjar	Bai Sundarabai	Anand Bhate	3:27
6.	"Nesali Pitambar Jari †" (Lavani)	Traditional	Bai Sundarabai	Asha Khadilkar	4:14
7.	"Vad Jau Kunala Sharan †" (Originally featured in Sangeet Saubhadra (1882) (Sangeet Natak))	Annasaheb Kirloskar	Bhaskarbuwa Bakhale	Anand Bhate	6:35
8.	"Ravi Mi †" (Originally featured in Sangeet Maanaapamaan (1911) (Sangeet Natak))	Krushnaji Prabhakar Khadilkar	Govindrao Tembe	Rahul Deshpande	3:20
9.	"Parvardigar" (First two lines of the song are taken from Sangeet Ekach Pyala (1919) (Sangeet Natak))	Swanand Kirkire	Kaushal Inamdar	Shankar Mahadevan, Anand Bhate and Chorus	6:40
10.	"Aaj Mhare Ghar Pavana"	Swanand Kirkire	Kaushal Inamdar	Bela Shende	4:48
11.	"Chinmaya Sakal Hridaya" (Originally featured in Sangeet Sanshaykallol (1916) (Sangeet Natak))	Govind Ballal Deval	Kaushal Inamdar	Anand Bhate and Chorus	6:40
12.	"Naman Natavara †" (Originally featured in Sangeet Maanaapamaan (1911) (Sangeet Natak))	Krushnaji Prabhakar Khadilkar; Gajanan Digambar Madgulkar	Govindrao Tembe; Kaushal Inamdar	Anand Bhate and Chorus	4:20
13.	"Bhav Tochi Dev †" (Originally featured in Dharmatma (Film))	K. Narayan Kale	Master Krishnarao	Anand Bhate	3:14
14.	"Saki Kamda Dindi †" (Originally featured in Sangeet Saubhadra (1882) (Sangeet Natak))	Annasaheb Kirloskar	Traditional	Omkar Dadarkar	1:20
15.	"Khara To Prema †" (Originally featured in Sangeet Maanaapamaan (1911) (Sangeet Natak))	Krushnaji Prabhakar Khadilkar	Govindrao Tembe	Anand Bhate	4:25
16.	"Nayane Lajaveet †" (Originally featured in Sangeet Maanaapamaan (1911) (Sangeet Natak))	Krushnaji Prabhakar Khadilkar	Govindrao Tembe	Anand Bhate	3:50
17.	"Mala Madan Bhase Ha †" (Originally featured in Sangeet Maanaapamaan (1911) (Sangeet Natak))	Krushnaji Prabhakar Khadilkar	Govindrao Tembe	Anand Bhate	4:34
18.	"Naath Ha Maajha †" (Originally featured in Sangeet Swayamwar (1916) (Sangeet Natak))	Krushnaji Prabhakar Khadilkar	Bhaskarbuwa Bakhale	Varada Godbole, Anand Bhate	3:06
19.	"Dhanarashi Jaata †" (Originally featured in Sangeet Maanaapamaan (1911) (Sangeet Natak))	Krushnaji Prabhakar Khadilkar	Govindrao Tembe	Anand Bhate	3:15
20.	"Naravara Krishna Saman †" (Originally featured in Sangeet Swayamwar (1916) (Sangeet Natak))	Krushnaji Prabhakar Khadilkar	Bhaskarbuwa Bakhale	Anand Bhate	4:01
21.	"Aga Vaikunthichya Raya †" (Originally featured in Sant Kanhopatra (1931) (Sangeet Natak))	Kanhopatra	Master Krishnarao	Anand Bhate	4:37
Total length:					1:28:58

† - Music recreated by Kaushal Inamdar
