= Shripadrao Nevrekar =

Indian actor and singer (1912–1977)

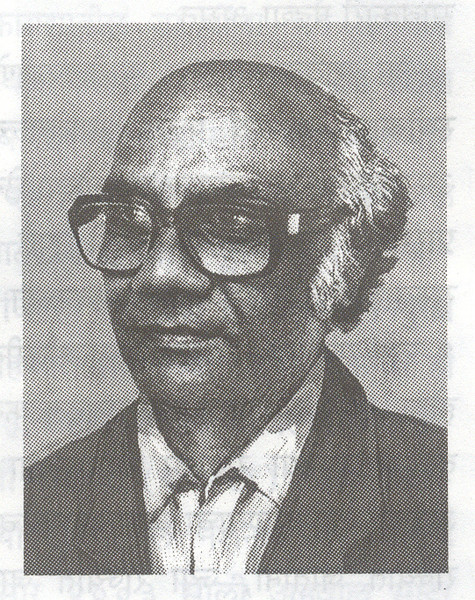
- Born: 3 July 1912; Madkai, Portuguese Goa
- Died: 16 June 1977 (aged 64)

Shripadrao Nevrekar (3 July 1912 – 16 June 1977), widely known by the title Natyaratna, was an Indian musical theatre actor and singer from Goa. He was a prominent lead actor in several notable musical plays (Sangeet Natak) during the mid-20th century.

== Early life ==
Shripadrao Nevrekar was born on 3 July 1912 in Madkai, Portuguese Goa. He did not possess a formal family background in music. During his childhood, his interest in music developed by watching the travelling drama companies and kirtankars who frequently visited Goa. During the 1920s, young individuals seeking musical training generally had only two career paths available: joining a theatre company or becoming a kirtankar. Due to his natural vocal talent and passion for the art, Nevrekar decided to enter the theatre profession. He initiated his acting career by performing various roles in plays organized by the Rathsaptamikar Samaj at the Shri Mahalakshmi Sabhamandap in Panaji.

== Theatre career ==
=== Rangbodhechhu ===
In 1930, at the age of 18, Nevrekar was invited by the theatre personality Raghuvir Savkar to join his "Rangbodhechhu" drama troupe. Within this organization, Nevrekar transitioned into a lead actor, playing the hero in prominent productions such as Manapaman, Sashaykallol, and Varvanchana. His performances with the troupe brought him widespread recognition. Around this time, the political leader Vinayak Damodar Savarkar honored Nevrekar with the title "Natyaratna" (Jewel of Theatre).

=== Gandharva Mandali ===
In 1932, Nanasaheb Chapekar facilitated Nevrekar's entry into the "Gandharva Mandali" drama troupe. His association with established singer-actors of the group, such as Master Krishnarao Phulambrikar, Vinayakrao Patwardhan, Ganpatrao Bodas, and Krishnarao Chonkar, significantly enhanced the depth and style of his theatre music (Natya Sangeet). Over time, Nevrekar and Chonkar came to be regarded as the primary pillars of the Gandharva Mandali. Whenever the lead singer Bal Gandharva faced vocal difficulties, the duo would step in to perform and entertain the audience.

=== Notable roles ===
Nevrekar became widely celebrated for his performances as Ramlal in Ekach Pyala and Kodanda in Sharda. His most celebrated portrayal was as Bhishmaka in the musical play Swayamvar. His rendition of the song "Ja Bhaya Na Mama Mana", composed in Raga Malkauns and delivered in his powerful, resonant voice, received exceptional historical acclaim from theatre audiences. He also performed leading roles in numerous productions staged by the Goa Hindu Association.

== Musical training and style ==
Nevrekar received his foundational musical education from Dattaramji Nandodkar. After stabilizing his career in theatre, he underwent several years of advanced training under Khansaheb Inayat Khan of the Tanras Khan Gharana. He later extended his musical studies under Khansaheb Khadim Hussain Khan of the Agra gharana.

Although proficient in both Hindustani classical music and light music, Nevrekar focused entirely on his theatrical profession. Consequently, he rarely participated in major public musical concerts (mehfils), though he continued to perform at private gatherings. After the closure of his drama company, he participated in devotional bhajan tours organized by Bal Gandharva, where the two artists performed musical duets (jugalbandi) for the listeners.

== Awards ==
- Bal Gandharva Gold Medal (Bhangarapadak)

== Later life and death ==
In 1972, around the age of 60, Nevrekar was appointed as a teacher of light music at the music college established by the Goa Kala Academy. He served in this position for approximately three years before relocating to Bombay. He died in Bombay on 16 June 1977 at the age of 65.
