= Balgandharva Rangmandir =

Theater and cultural venue

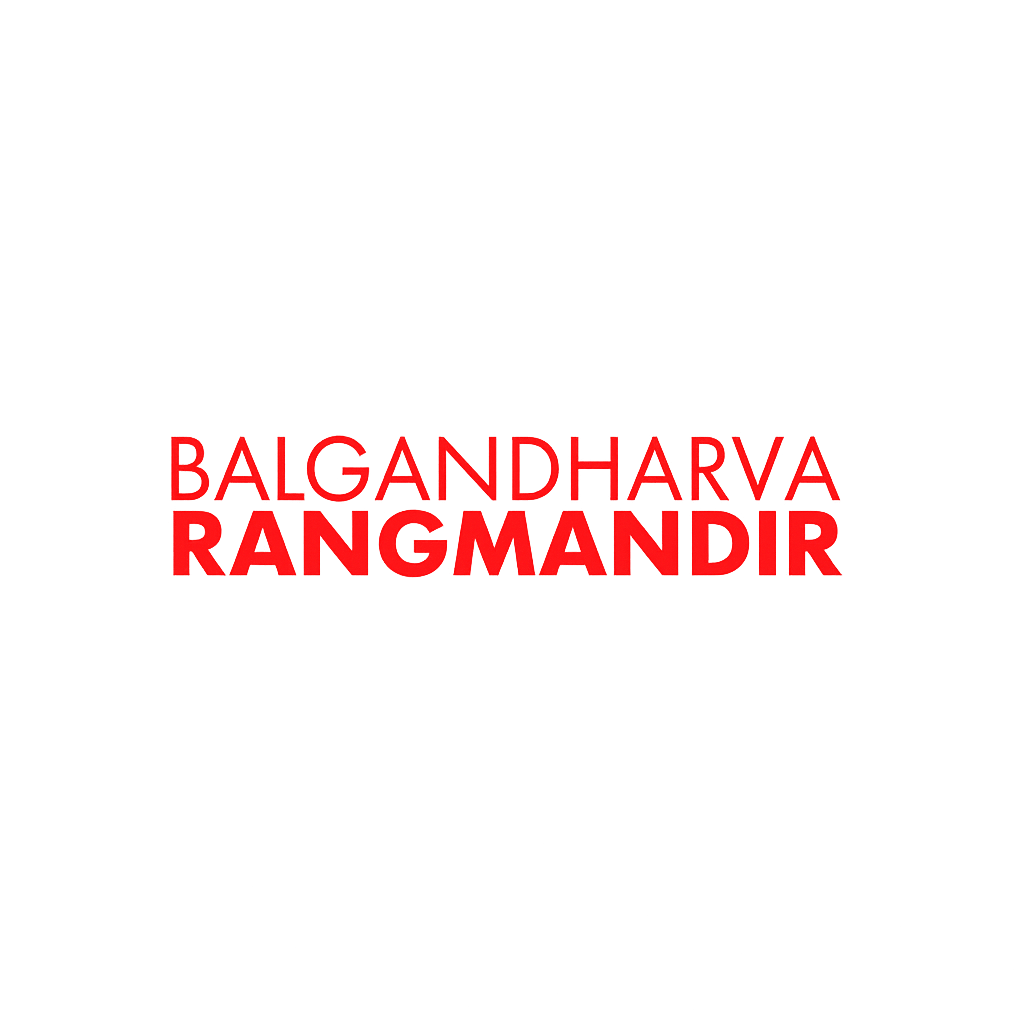
- Interactive map of Balgandharva Rangmandir
- Address: Bandra West, Mumbai, India
- Coordinates: 19°03′50.7″N 72°50′01.8″E
- Seating type: Auditorium
- Capacity: 687
- Type: Performing-arts center

Construction
- Opened: August 2016

Website
- www.rangmandir.in

Balgandharva Rangmandir is a theater and cultural venue in Mumbai, India. Named after the Marathi theater actor and singer Bal Gandharva (1886–1967), the venue was redeveloped from a municipal open-air theater into an enclosed auditorium. The redevelopment was initiated in 1992 through a lease agreement between the Brihanmumbai Municipal Corporation (BMC) and the K Raheja Foundation. After a prolonged development period, the renovated complex opened to the public in August 2016.

== History and development ==
The site originally functioned as an open-air theater managed by the Brihanmumbai Municipal Corporation (BMC). By the 1990s, the structure had deteriorated due to maintenance challenges. In 1992, the BMC leased the property to the K Raheja Foundation, a nonprofit organization, to redevelop it into a modern performance space. The project faced many delays, such as structural design and construction limitations, before its completion in 2016. The original structure was demolished and replaced with a fully enclosed auditorium, which opened to the public in 2016.

== Cultural programs ==
Balgandharva Rangmandir hosts Marathi theater, Indian classical music and dance, film festivals, and workshops. It has been used for theatrical adaptations of films such as Monsoon Wedding and Umrao Jaan, as well as historical plays like Humare Ram and Mahabharat.

== Theatrical productions ==
Notable productions staged at the venue include:

- Balle Balle (2017), a musical ballet by Wizcraft Entertainment
- The Mousetrap (2019), a production of Agatha Christie by an international British theater group
- Tumhari Saaiyara (2019), a Hindi play by Nadira Babbar
- Mughal-e-Azam: The Musical (2022), directed by Feroz Abbas Khan, with costumes by Manish Malhotra
- Broken Images (2022), a solo play by Girish Karnad, performed by Shabana Azmi
- JAYA (2024), an English-language rock musical based on the Mahabharata, produced and directed by Lillete Dubey
- Basuri Jab Gane Lagi (2025), based on the life of flautist Hariprasad Chaurasia

The auditorium has also hosted previews for films such as Gold (2018), Dunki (2023) and Metro… In Dino (2025).
