= Anand Bhate =

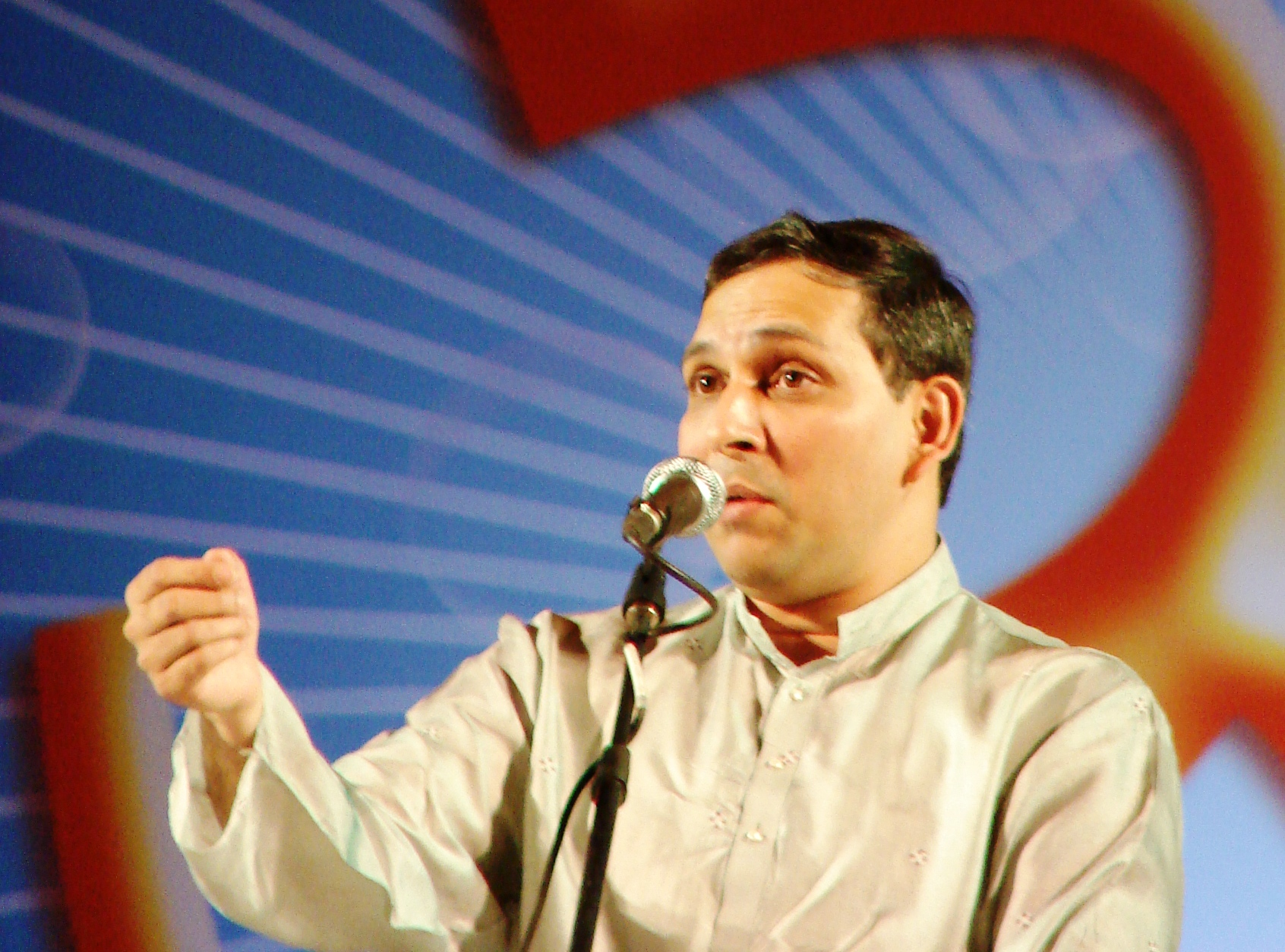
- Anand Bhate singing in Vasantotsav, 2011

Background information
- Also known as: Anand Gandharva
- Born: Anand Bhate; 29 April 1971 (age 55)
- Genre: Indian classical music
- Occupation: singer
- Years active: 1981–present

Anand Bhate (born 29 April 1971) is an Indian classical vocalist from the Kirana gharana. He is popular for his classical singing of songs from the Marathi film Balgandharva (2011).

In 2024, he was awarded the Sangeet Natak Akademi Award, by Sangeet Natak Akademi, India's National Academy for Performing arts, for his contribution to Abhang singing.

== Early life and training ==
Anand was born in Pune, India in 1971, in a family active in Indian classical music. He inherited the singing tradition from his great-grandfather Bhate Buva, who was a well known vocalist for Thumri and Natya Sangeet in the 19th century. By the age of 10, he had started systematic training in classical singing from Chandrashekhar Deshpande, after which he trained under Yashwantbua Marathe and with Bhimsen Joshi, with whom he trained for 15 years. He graduated from College of Engineering Pune.

== Career ==
His first public appearance was as a child in 1981, when he performed Balgandharva's gayaki on All India Radio, Doordarshan and had a tour in the USA. Over the years, he has performed all over India and abroad in many prestigious music festivals such as the Sawai Gandharva Sangeet Mahotsav, Pandit Jitendra Abhisheki Sangeet Samaroha, Chaturang Pratishthan Rangsammelan and Learn quest Music Conference.

Bhate won the National Film Award for Best Male Playback Singer for the 2011 Marathi movie on the life of the Marathi stage actor/singer Balgandharva.

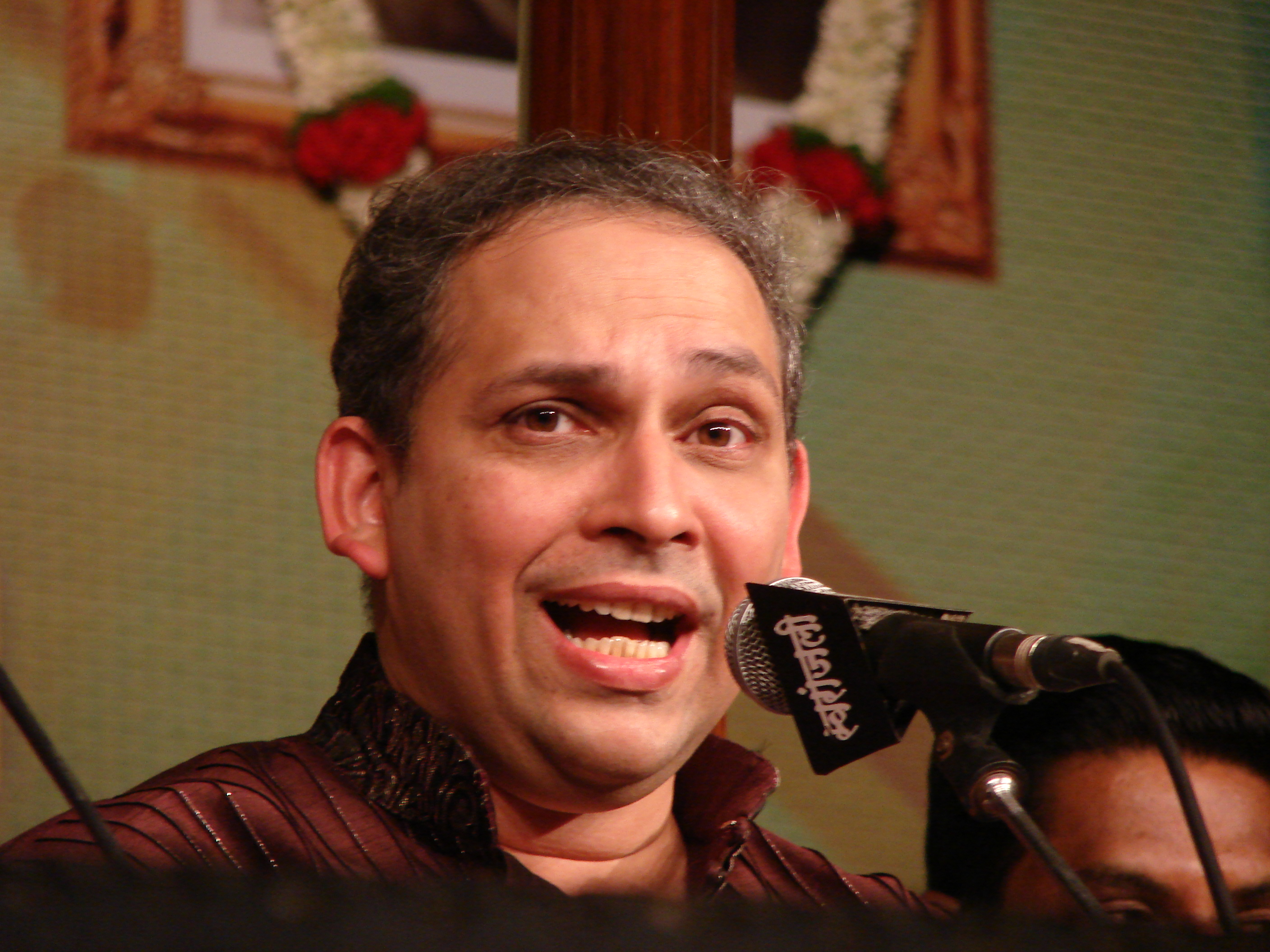
Anand Bhate in Sawai Gandharva Bhimsen Festival 2015

== Awards and achievements ==
- Honoured with the title "Anand Gandharva" in 1981 at the age of 10
- Released an album of Natyasangeet in 1983
- Swaryogini Dr. Prabha Atre award from Gaanvardhan & Tatyasaheb Natu foundation Pune, for his significant achievements and performing career.
- Balgandharva Gunagaurav Puraskar by Balgandharva Sangeet Rasik Mandal
- Pandit Ramkrishnabua Vaze Young Artiste Award in 2006
- Dr. Prabha Atre Puraskar, by Ganawardhan, Pune in 2012
- National Film Award for Best Male Playback Singer for Balgandharva
- Balagandharva Puraskar by Akhil Bharatiya Natya Parishad, Mumbai in 2012
- Maharashtra State award
- Zee award
- MIFTA award
