= Ramdas Kamat =

Indian musician (1931–2022)

- Born: Ramdas Shantaram Kamat; 18 February 1931; Mapuçá, Goa, Portuguese India
- Died: 8 January 2022 (aged 90); Vile Parle, Maharashtra, India
- Education: BA with Honours in Economics

Ramdas Shantaram Kamat (18 February 1931 – 8 January 2022) was an Indian musician who worked in Sangeet Natak, Marathi theatre.

== Early life ==
As a child he took Hindustani classical music lessons from elder brother Upendra. Natya Sangeet studied under Pt. Govind Buwa Agni, Pt. Jitendra Abhisheki, Shri. Prabhakar Pendharkar, Shri. Bhalachandra Pendharkar, and Pt. Bhimsen Joshi.

Bhava Geet Gayan studied under Yashwant Deo, Natak Saunstha, The Goa Hindu Association Mumbai, Gopinath Savkar's Kala Mandir, Mumbai Marathi Natya Sangha, Ranga Sharada, Bharat Natya Mandir Pune, Jayaram Shiledar's Marathi Rangabhoomi, and Mohan Wagh's Chandralekha.

He acted under direction of Gopinath Savkar, Mo. Ga. Rangnekar, Master Dattaram, Nandkumar Raote, Bhalachandra Pendharkar & Madhukar Todarmal.

== Personal life and death ==
Kamat died at his home in Vile Parle, a neighbourhood of Mumbai, on 8 January 2022, at age 90.

== Performances ==
Kamat acted in 18 plays in his lifetime listed below.

- Sangeet Saunshay-Kallol
- Sangeet Sadhu ani Ashwinsheth
- Sangeet Sharada
- Sangeet Saubhadra
- Sangeet Maanapaman
- Sangeet Sannyasacha Saunsar
- Sangeet Kanhopatra
- Sangeet Ekach Pyala
- Sangeet Matyagandha
- Sangeet Yayati ani Devayani
- Sangeet Madanachi Manjiri
- Sangeet Hey Bandh Reshmanche
- Sangeet Meera Madhura
- Sangeet Honaji Bala
- Sangeet Swarasmarat
- Sangeet Mandaarmala
- Sangeet Dhanya Te Gayani kala
- Sangeet Saubhadra Sageetika

== Awards ==
- Maharashtra Government Akheel Bharatiya Marathi Natya Parishad's Bal Gandharva Puraskar.
- Pune Chichwad Municipal Corporations Bal Gandharva Puraskar.
- Sangli Nagarpalika's Govin Ballal Deval Puraskar.
- Maharashtra Rajya Sanskritik Puraskar for Upashastriya Sangeet .
- Chhota Gandharva Puraskar at Koregaon.
- Akheel Bharatiya Natya Parishad's Keshavrao Bhole Puraskar.
- Akheel Bharatiya Natya Parishad's Jitendra Abhisheki Puraskar.
- Yashwantrao Prathishthan's Swara Raaj Chhota Gandharva Puraskar.
- Manipal T M A Pai Foundation's outstanding Konkani Puraskar.
- Vishnudas Bhave Puraskar, Sangli.
- President of the Marathi Natya Sammelan, Beed, held on 13, 14 & 15 Feb 2009.
- Parle Bhushan Puraskar 2010.
- 90th Marathi Natya Sammelan & First Vishwa Marathi Natya Sammelan held in New Jersey USA.
- Mumbai Swara Sanman Puraskar on the World Music day in 2013.
- Bakhle Buwa's Bharat Gayan Samaj Pune's Pandit Ram Marathe Puraskar.
- Maharashtra Government balwant Pandurang aka Annasaheb Kirloskar Sangeet rangabhoomi Jeevan Gaurav Puraskar in January 2014.
- New Delhi's Sangeet Natak Akademi Award on 23-10-2015.
- Uttung Puraskar Vile Parle Mumbai 03-01-2016.
- Maharashtra Government Saunskrutik Puraskar 2014, received on 31-01-2016.
- Parnekar Maharaj Pratishthan Pune's Puraskar received on 26-03-2016.
- Sahyadri Vahini Natya Ratna Puraskar on 12-05-2016.
