= Sadashiv Bhosle =

Indian activist and politician (1920–2021)

Kutre Sadashiv Bhosle
- Born: 1 January 1920; Kadoli, Belgaum
- Died: 15 April 2021 (aged 101); Kadoli, Belagavi, Karnataka, India
- Other name: Sadashiv Bapusaheb Bhosale
- Occupations: Politician, social reformer
- Known for: Indian independence activism, Gandhian principles
- Notable work: Establishment of Vatsalyadham, Gandhi Ghar, and Kasturba Kendra
- Title: Member of the Legislative Assembly (1947–1952, 1952–1957)

Kutre Sadashiv Bhosle (1 January 1920 – 15 April 2021), also known as Sadashiv Bapusaheb Bhosale, was an Indian social activist, independence activist, Gandhian, and politician from Karnataka. He was the first Member of the Legislative Assembly from Belgaum after India's independence and was often referred to as the "Bapu" of Belgaum. Bhosale was a centenarian and died in 2021 at the age of 101.

He founded Gandhi Ghar to spread Gandhian principles and Kasturba Kendra for women's empowerment. He also set up Vatsalyadham in Mudhol, Bagalkot district to aid villagers.

== Early life and work ==
Bhosle was born on 1 January 1920 in Kadoli village, Belgaum district, to Bapu Saheb and Savitri Bhosle. As a student, he joined the Indian independence movement. In 1942, he participated in the Quit India Movement and was imprisoned for over two years at Yerwada Central Jail, where he was influenced by Gandhian principles. In 1947, Bhosle was elected as the MLA for South Belgaum. He served a second term in 1952, representing the Bagewadi constituency. He resigned from his position in 1955, citing concerns over the administration's alignment with Gandhian principles.

Vinoba Bhave's Gram Swaraj and Bhoodan movement inspired Bhosale, who thereafter traveled across Karnataka. He spent six years in Kosuru, Mundgod (Uttara Kannada district), training individuals and integrating them into the social mainstream. Upon returning home, he convinced his father to donate 24 of their 25 shared acres of land to 50 underprivileged families, promoting the Bhoodan movement in his community.

He established Gandhi Ghar, a center dedicated to spreading Gandhian principles, on the remaining acre at Devagiri. He founded the Kasturba Kendra to promote women's empowerment. In 1960, he initiated a hunger strike to oppose a liquor store in his village, leading to the government revoking its license.

== Personal life ==
Despite his affluent background, Bhosale chose a simple life dedicated to Gandhian ideals. He married Vatsala in a temple ceremony.

He died on 15 April 2021, at the age of 101, at his residence in Kacheri Galli, Kadoli, Belagavi.

== See also ==
- Vaman Narayan Joshi
