= Bal Gandharva Ranga Mandir =

Theater in Pune, India

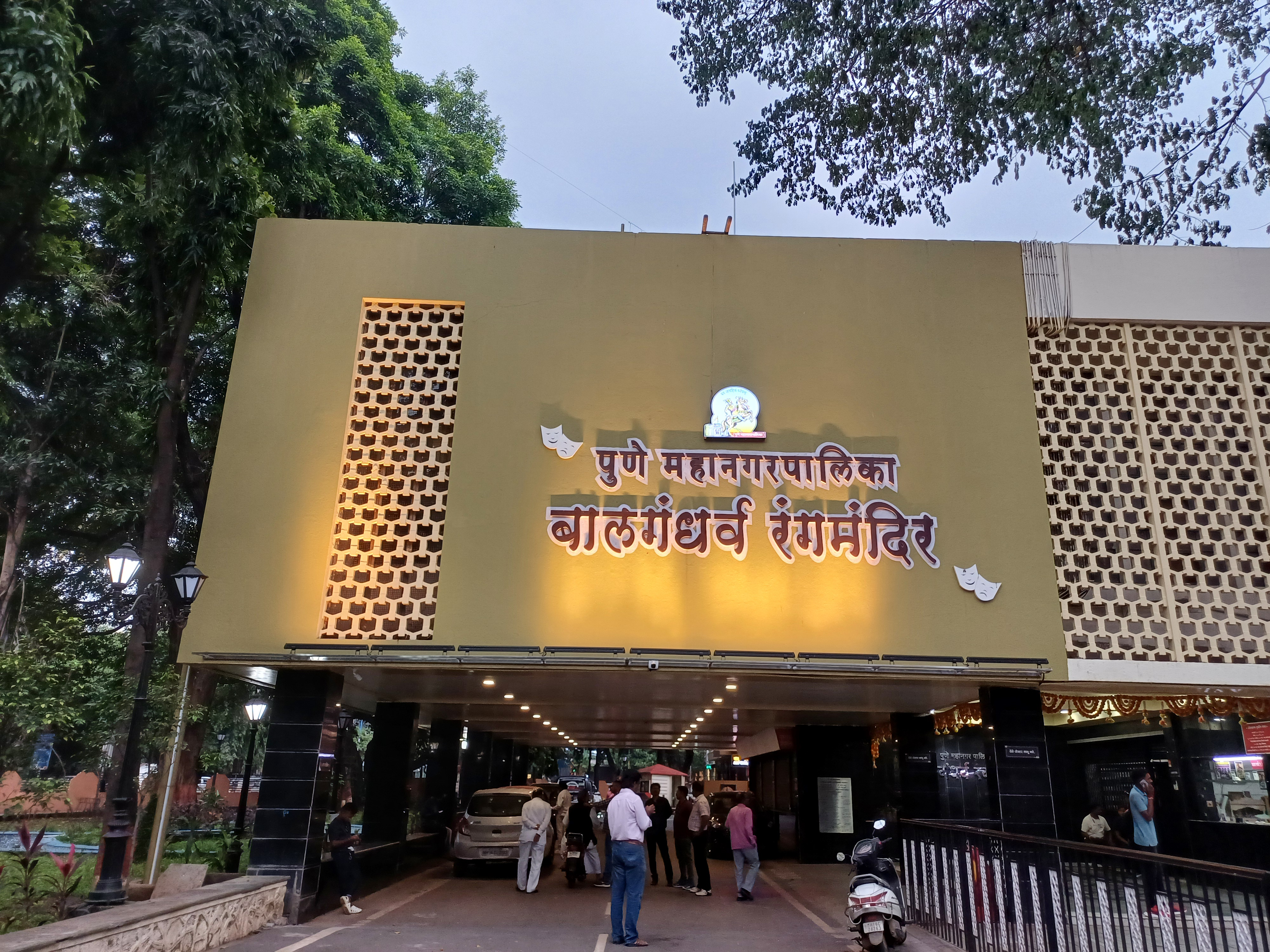
- Entrance of Bal Gandharva Ranga Mandir
- Interactive map of Bal Gandharva Ranga Mandir
- Location: Jangali Maharaj Road, Shivajinagar, Pune, Maharashtra
- Coordinates: 18°31′20.68″N 73°50′54.94″E
- Owner: Pune Municipal Corporation
- Capacity: 989

Construction
- Groundbreaking: 8 October 1962
- Opened: 26 June 1968

The Bal Gandharva Ranga Mandir is a drama theatre with an auditorium and exhibition hall located in Shivajinagar area of Pune, India. It is named after Marathi singer and stage actor, Bal Gandharva.

The cornerstone for the theatre was laid in 1962. The opening ceremony was performed under the chairmanship of Acharya Atre in the year 1968 and it was inaugurated by the then home minister of India, Yashwantrao Chavan.

Pu. La. Deshpande, the popular writer and humourist of Maharashtra was instrumental in the formulation of idea for this drama theatre.

Pune Municipal Corporation, the civic body of Pune, owns the theatre. The theatre is located near Sambhaji Park in Pune. It is one of the most important cultural destinations in Pune City. Apart from the plays, many cultural, educational, social and corporate, along with other seminars and exhibitions are also conducted in the auditorium and in exhibition hall which is on the upper floor of the premises.
