= List of awards and nominations received by Neeta Lulla =

Neeta Lulla awards and nominations
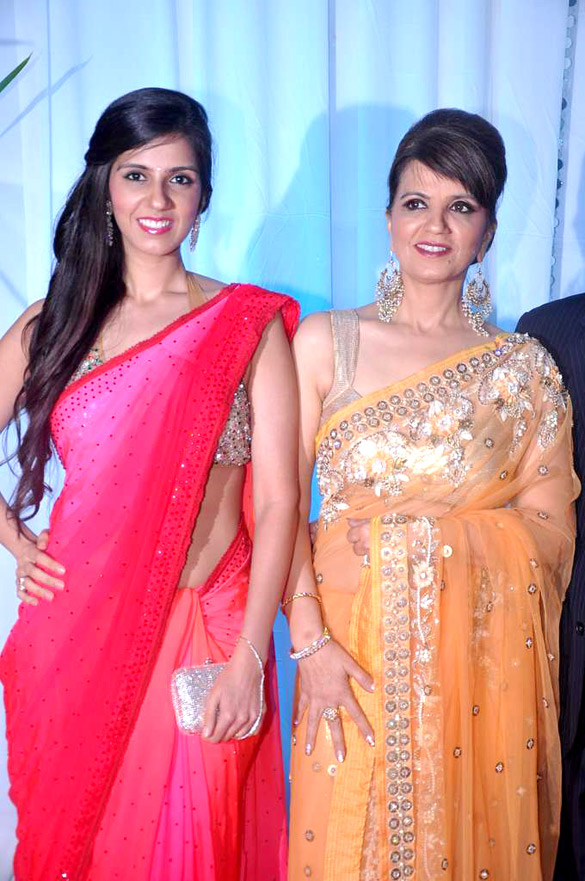
- Neeta Lulla with her daughter Nishka Lulla at Esha Deol's wedding reception
Awards and nominations
Award	Wins	Nominations
National Film Awards	4	4
Filmfare Awards	0	2
IIFA	2	2
Bollywood Movie Awards	2	2
Zee Cine Awards	1	1

Totals (Note: Certain award groups do not simply award one winner. They acknowledge several different recipients, have runners-up, and have third place. Since this is a specific recognition and is different from losing an award, runner-up mentions are considered wins in this award tally. For simplification and to avoid errors, each award in this list has been presumed to have had a prior nomination.)
- Wins: 11
- Nominations: 13

Neeta Lulla is an Indian fashion designer. She designed costumes for films like Lamhe (1990), Devdas (2002 Hindi film) (2002), and Jodhaa Akbar. For her work on these films and Balgandharva (2011), Neeta won National Film Award for Best Costume Design four times.

== National Film Awards ==
Year	Film	Result
1991	Lamhe	Won
2002	Devdas	Won
2008	Jodhaa Akbar	Won
2011	Balgandharva	Won

== Filmfare Awards ==
The Filmfare Awards are one of the oldest and most prestigious film honours in India. They are presented annually by The Times Group to recognise excellence in cinematic achievement. Lulla received two nominations.

Year	Film	Result	Ref.
2003	Devdas	Nominated	
2009	Jodhaa Akbar	Nominated	

== Bollywood Movie Awards ==
Year	Film	Result
2001	Mission Kashmir	Won
2003	Devdas	Won

== IIFA Awards ==
Year	Film	Result
2000	Taal	Won
2009	Jodhaa Akbar	Won

== Zee Cine Awards ==
Year	Film	Result
2002	Devdas	Won

== Kingfisher Fashion Award ==
- Winner - Special Honorary Award (2005)

== India Leadership Conclave ==
- Winner - Fashion Designer of the Decade (2016)
