= Pendharkar =

Pendharkar is a family name that may be found in Marathi Brahmin families.

== History ==
A small village called 'Pendhri' is the original place of all Pendharkars. Pendhri is in Sindhudurg district of Maharashtra. It is a place 10–12 km from Talere. State Transport buses going to Kharepatan or Vijaydurg go via Talere.

'Sthaneshwar Mahadev' and Goddess 'Mahalakshmi' of Kolhapur are the family gods of Pendharkars.

== Notable people with this name ==
- Baburao Pendharkar, actor
- Bhalchandra Pendharkar, actor
- Bhalji Pendharkar, film director
- Prabhakar Pendharkar, writer
- Yashwant Dinkar Pendharkar, poet and writer
