= Marathi theatre =

Indian theatre in the Marathi language

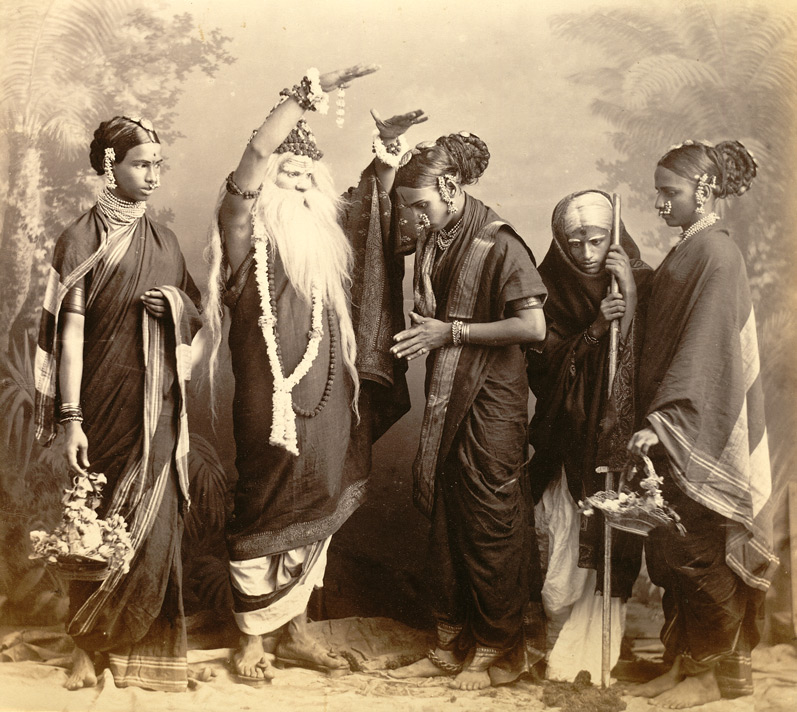
A Marathi theatrical group, Mumbai, 1870.

Marathi theatre is theatre in the Marathi language, mostly originating or based in the state of Maharashtra in India, and elsewhere with Marathi diaspora. Starting in the middle of the 19th century, it flourished in the 1950s and 1960s. Today, it continues to have a marked presence in the State of Maharashtra with a loyal audience base, when most theatre in other parts of India have had tough time facing the onslaught of cinema and television. Its repertoire ranges from musicals, humorous social plays, farces, historical plays like 'Vedat Marathe Veer Daudale Saat' by Bashir Momin Kavathekar, to experimental plays and serious drama of the 1970s onwards, by Vijay Tendulkar, P. L. Deshpande, Mahesh Elkunchwar and Satish Alekar, which have influenced theatre throughout India. In the post-independence era, Bengali theatre, and Marathi theatre have been at the forefront of innovations and significant dramaturgy in Indian theatre.

== History ==
=== Ancient and medieval period ===
The region of Maharashtra, has had long theatrical tradition, one of the early references is found in the cave inscriptions at Nashik by Gautami Balashri, the mother of 1st-century Satavahana ruler, Gautamiputra Satakarni. The inscription mention him organizing Utsava and Samaja forms of theatrical entertainment for his subjects.

There are sources mentioning plays from 17th-century like Lakshmaikalyanam, and Ganga-Kaveri Samvad, in the Marathi-language staged for the Bhosale ruler of Tanjore in present-day Tamil Nadu state. However, these were plays performed in the royal court.

=== British colonial period (1818-1947) ===
The first public performance of a stage play in Marathi was Sita Swayamvar (Marriage of Sita) by Vishnudas Bhave, based on a popular episode of the epic Ramayana. Staged in 1843 in Sangli, with ruler of the princely state of Sangli in audience, it was an experimental play, based on traditional theatre form called Yakshagana from the neighbouring Karnataka region. In 1842, Karki Mela (Repertory) from Honnavar region of Coastal Karnataka, performed before the Rajasaheb of Sangli, who encouraged court artists to learn from the group acting and singing. This laid basis for Marathi Professional theatre. After the success of his play, Vishnudas Bhave staged many more plays about other episodes of Ramayana. His plays were largely influenced by the Shakespearean and Parsi theatres. Bhave went on to form a travelling theatre troupe. The coming decades saw notable plays like Jhansichya Raniche Naatak (1870), Sawai Madhavravancha Mrutyu (1871), Afzal Khanachya Mrutyuche Naatak (1871) and Malharrav Maharaj (1875). However, Marathi stage took a distinct theatre form with the musical Shakuntal by Annasaheb Kirloskar in 1880, based on a classical work, Abhijnanasakuntalam by Kalidasa.The success of his theatre company, Kirloskar Natya Mandali paved way for commercial repertories in Marathi theatre, and subsequently the formation of Natak Companies.

The early period of Marathi theatre was dominated by playwrights like Kolhatkar, Krushnaji Prabhakar Khadilkar, Govind Ballal Deval, Ram Ganesh Gadkari and Annasaheb Kirloskar who enriched the Marathi theatre for about half a century with excellent musical plays known as Sangeet Natak. The genre of music used in such plays is known as Natya Sangeet. It is during this era of the Marathi theatre that great singer-actors like Bal Gandharva, Keshavrao Bhole, Bhaurao Kolhatkar and Deenanath Mangeshkar thrived.

=== Post-independence period ===
In the second half of the 20th century, some theatre practitioners have incorporated the traditional forms like tamasha and dashavatar into their plays. In the 1970s, the tamasha form was employed as narrative device and style in several notable plays like Ghashiram Kotwal by Vijay Tendulkar, Vijaya Mehta's Marathi adaptations of Bertolt Brecht's The Good Woman of Setzuan as Devajine Karuna Keli (1972) and Caucasian Chalk Circle as Ajab Nyaya Vartulacha (1974), Bashir Momin Kavathekar's historical "Bhangale Swapna Maharashtra" (1976) & "Vedat Marathe Veer Daudale Saat"(1977), P. L. Deshpande's Teen paishacha Tamasha (1978), an adaptation of Brecht's The Threepenny Opera. Mehta also adapted and Ionesco with Chairs. Varyavarchi Varat" the most famous and comedy play written by "Pu.la.Deshpande" and also this play is still in theaters with new cast & crew . Although the characters created by Pu.La. were fictional many people still relate to them.

== Marathi Rangabhoomi Din ==
5 November is Celebrated as "Marathi Rangabhoomi Din".

== See also ==
- List of Marathi theatre actors
- Theatre in India

== Bibliography ==
- Anand Patil (1993). Western influence on Marathi drama: a case study. Rajahaṃsa. ISBN 81-85854-06-8.
- Dnyaneshwar Nadkarni (1988). Balgandharva and the Marathi theatre. Roopak Book.
- Shanta Gokhale; National School of Drama (2000). Playwright at the Centre: Marathi drama from 1843 to the present. Seagull Books. ISBN 81-7046-157-X.
- Shanta Gokhale (2008). "Mapping Marathi theatre". India-seminar.
