= 1909 (film) =

- Poster
- Directed by: Abhay Kambli
- Written by: Abhay Kambli
- Produced by: Ajay Prabhakar Kambli
- Starring: Akshay Shimpi; Shrikant Bhide; Shrinivas Joshi; Rohan Pednekar; Charles Thomson
- Release date: 2014
- Running time: 156 minutes
- Country: India
- Language: Marathi

1909 is a 2014 Marathi−language historical drama based on the assassination of British officer Arthur Jackson by Indian revolutionary Anant Kanhere. Directed by Abhay Kambli, the film is set in the year 1909, during the period of British dominion over India and focuses on the young revolutionaries' efforts to drive the British out of the country and gain freedom.

== Plot ==
Anant Kanhere is a young lad from a small village in Konkan who goes to Aurangabad to pursue studies. Influenced by Lokmanya Tilak and Vinayak Savarkar's ideologies, Anant decides to contribute to the freedom struggle. Meanwhile, in Nashik, Krushnaji Karve and his aides are preparing for an armed rebellion, but it is their mentor Ganesh Savarkar who advises them to wait for the right moment to strike. The root cause of everyone's anger is the collector of Nashik, Officer Jackson who has invited the wrath of people through his actions. And when he orders the arrest of Ganesh, Krushnaji and his group including Anant get into motion to execute Jackson's assassination.

== Cast ==
- Akshay Shimpi as Anant Kanhere
- Shrikant Bhide as Anna Karve
- Shrinivas Joshi as Vaman Joshi
- Rohan Pednekar as Vinayak Deshpande
- Charles Thomson
- Shubhankar Atre as Ganu Vaidya
- Harshad Panchal as Ganesh Kanhere
- Chetan Sharma as Shankar Soman
- Amit Vashi as Babarao Savarkar

== Reception ==
A reviewer from The Times of India gave the film a rating of 3 out of 5, noting that while the narrative occasionally loses pace and includes a few unnecessary scenes, 1909 ultimately stands out as a commendable film that explores a subject rarely addressed in Marathi cinema.
