= List of Marathi theatre actors =

This is a list of notable Marathi theatre actors.

== A ==
- Anand Abhyankar
- Ankush Choudhary
- Ashok Saraf
- Avinash Masurekar

== B ==
- Sunil Barve
- Bharat Jadhav
- Bal Gandharva

== D ==
- Dada Kondke
- Bal Dhuri

== G ==
- Vikram Gokhale

== J ==
- Jabbar Patel (when young)

== K ==
- Kashinath Ghanekar
- Macchindra Kambli
- Kedar Shinde

== L ==
- Laxmikant Berde
- Kavita Lad

== N ==
- Nana Patekar
- Neena Kulkarni

== P ==
- Dilip Prabhavalkar

== S ==
- Sayaji Shinde
