= Vaman Narayan Joshi =

Indian freedom fighter (1889 – 1964)

- Born: 1889; Samsherapur, Akole tehsil, Ahmednagar, Maharashtra, India
- Died: 14 January 1964 (aged 74–75)
- Other name: Daji
- Occupations: Freedom fighter, revolutionary
- Known for: Involvement in the assassination of A. M. T. Jackson
- Movement: Indian independence movement
- Criminal penalty: Life imprisonment

Vaman Narayan Joshi (also spelled as Waman Narayan Joshi) (1889 – 14 January 1964) also known as Daji was an Indian freedom fighter and revolutionary from Maharashtra. He is known for his involvement in the assassination of Nashik's district collector, A. M. T. Jackson, as Joshi trained Anant Laxman Kanhere, who carried out the killing of Jackson. Following Jackson's assassination, Joshi was arrested and sentenced to life imprisonment. He became a prominent figure in the revolutionary movements of his time.

== Early life ==
Joshi was born into a poor family in 1889 in the village of Samsherapur in the Akole tehsil of Ahilyanagar, Maharashtra. After his father's death, Joshi and his elder brother resorted to begging to support their family due to severe financial difficulties. He worked as a teacher in a Panchayat Union school.

== Role in the Independence movement ==
At the age of 15, he took a pledge to boycott foreign goods, a commitment he upheld throughout his life. In 1907, when he was in Nashik, he became actively involved in revolutionary organisations such as Mitra Mela and Abhinav Bharat, founded by Vinayak Damodar Savarkar.

Joshi played a major role in the assassination of Arthur Mason Tippetts Jackson, the British collector of Nasik. He trained Anant Laxman Kanhere for the assassination, orchestrating the plan that led to Jackson's death.

He provided firearms training to Anant Kanhere and assisted him in identifying Jackson for the assassination. Joshi drafted the entire assassination plan in a letter, sending it to Kanhere at his residence in Aurangabad. Upon comprehending the plan from Joshi's letter, Kanhere tore it into fragments and disposed of them in a corner of the room. Later, the British authorities reconstructed the 28 torn pieces of this letter and presented them as evidence against Vaman Narayan Joshi in court.

== Imprisonment ==
On 29 December 1909, Vaman Narayan Joshi was arrested for his involvement in the assassination of Jackson. He was taken from his ancestral home in Samsherapur in handcuffs and ropes. Despite a search of the house, nothing incriminating was found. British authorities paraded him before the public, marching him 40 kilometres from Samsherapur to Nasik to instill fear among the people.

In Nasik Jail, Joshi faced brutal treatment for several days by a police sub-inspector named Ali Khan. He was offered leniency in exchange for confessing to the crime and implicating his fellow revolutionaries, particularly mentioning Vinayak Damodar Savarkar. However, Joshi bravely faced the torture and calmly stated, "I accept death, but I will not disclose any information about my comrades."

In 1918, he was transferred from Cellular Jail to Yerwada Jail in Pune, where he was kept for four years and subjected to unbearable hardships, including forced labour, before his release in 1922. After serving his sentence, Joshi returned to his village and found his family scattered and facing continued harassment from British authorities.

== Death ==
Vaman Narayan Joshi died on 14 January 1964.

== Bibliography ==
- Aggarwal, Som Nath (2011). The Cellular Jail in Our Freedom Struggle. National Council of Educational Research and Training. ISBN 978-9350071434.
