= Tamboori =

Indian string instrument

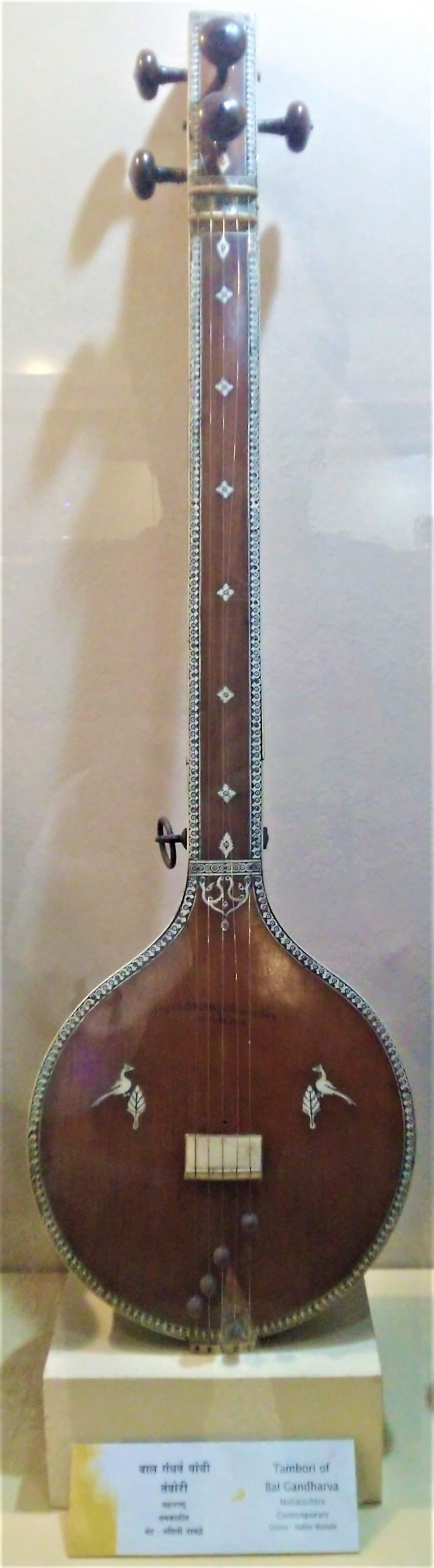
Tamboori of Bal Gandharva in the collection of Raja Dinkar Kelkar Museum, Pune

The tamboori (also called a tambra) is a long-necked bowed string instrument found in Indian music. The tamboori is very similar to the tanpura, despite being smaller and played with a bow. A tamboori is played as a melodic instrument, unlike the tanpura. Each string has a fundamental tone with its own spectrum of overtones, which makes a rich and vibrant sound, due to interactive harmonic resonance that will support the external tones played by the soloist.

The name tamboori is derived from tama or tana, referring to a musical phrase, and borri, or bori which means "vibrant".

The body shape of the tamboori somewhat resembles that of the sitar, but it has no frets. One or more tambooris may be used to accompany vocalists or instrumentalists. It has six metal strings, which are bowed to create a harmonic resonance on the basic notes of a key.

The tamboori is used to add drone in a performance. It is part of the ektara family of instruments.
