= Bhalchandra Pendharkar =

Indian actor (1921–2015)

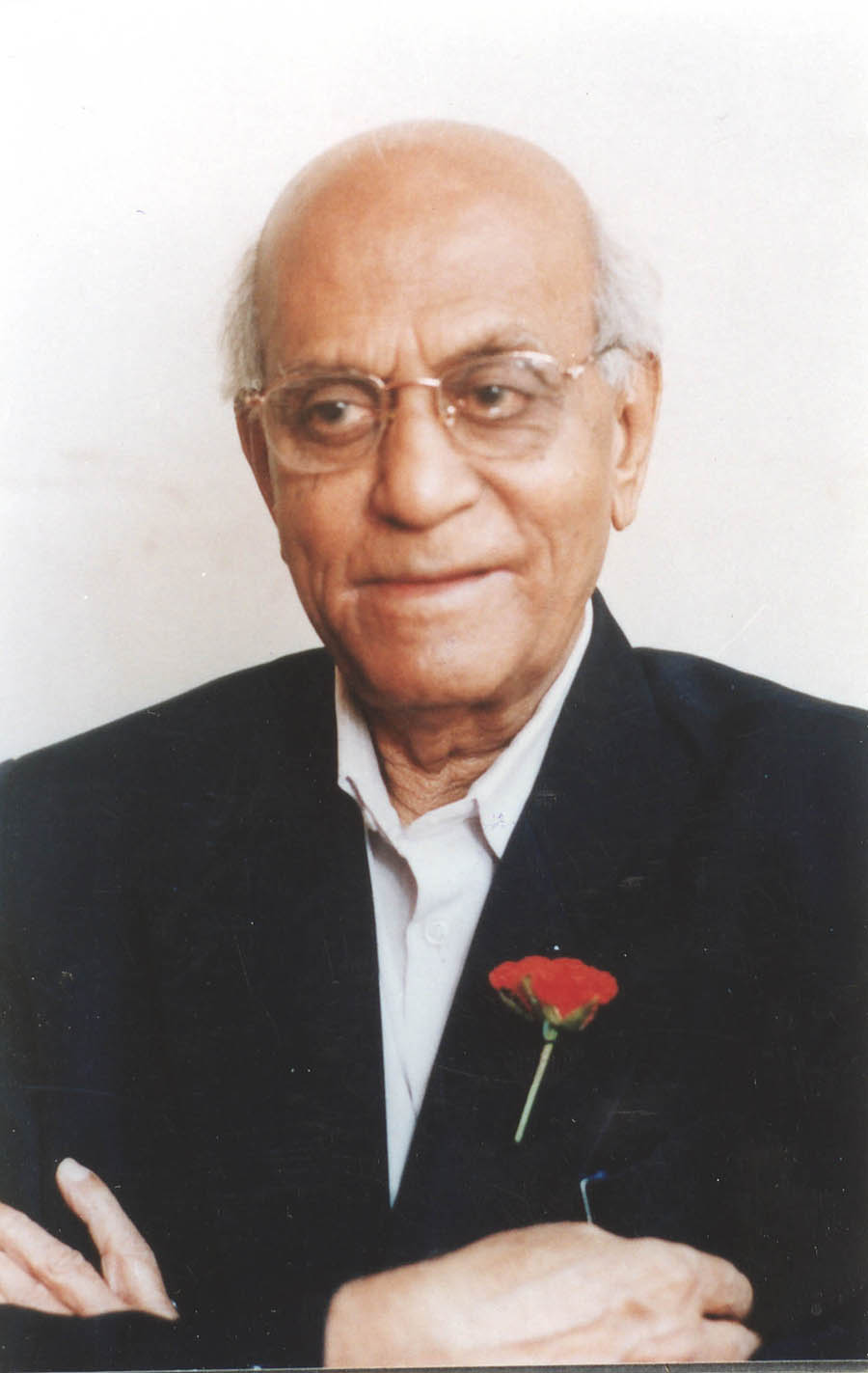
- Born: 25 November 1921; Hyderabad, Andhra Pradesh
- Died: 11 August 2015 (aged 93); Mumbai, Maharashtra, India
- Occupations: Actor, Singer and Drama Producer
- Years active: 1942–2015

Bhalchandra Pendharkar (25 November 1921 – 11 August 2015) was a Marathi stage actor, singer and drama producer.

== Career ==
Bhalchandra Pendharkar was affectionately known as Anna and gained immense popularity through his play Duritanche Timir Javo. Pendharkar played a vital role in the strengthening of the "Lalitkaladarsh Natak Mandali" which was founded in 1908 by Keshavrao Bhosale in the year 1907. Among Pendharkar's most memorable contributions to the field of theatre were plays like ' Duritanche Timir Jaavo', 'Panditrao Jagannath', 'Gita Gaati Dnyaneshwar' and 'Shabbas Birbal Shabbas'.

He gained immense popularity through his play "Duritanche Timir Javo". The song "Aai Tujhi Aathvan Yete" in Marathi was very popular from this play.

He was known to be strict and made sure that the plays started on time. He recorded over 300 plays which were performed at Mumbai Marathi Sahitya Sangh.

== Plays ==
1. Satteche Gulam (सत्तेचे गुलाम)
2. Duritanche Timir Jaavo (दुरितांचे तिमिर जावो : बाळ कोल्हटकर)
3. Panditrao Jagannath (पंडितराज जगन्नाथ : विद्याधर गोखले)
4. Gita Gaati Dnyaneshwar (गीता गाती ज्ञानेश्वर)
5. Shabbas Birbal Shabbas (शाब्बास बिरबल शाब्बास)
6. Swamini (स्वामिनी : पु.भा. भावे)
7. Jai Jai Gaurishankar (जय जय गौरीशंकर : विद्याधर गोखले)
8. Anandi Gopal (आनंदी गोपाळ)
9. Rakt nako maj prem have (रक्त नको मज प्रेम हवे)
10. Zala Anant Hanumant (झाला अनंत हनुमंत)

== Awards ==
He received many honours and awards

- Nagri Satkar, 1968 (१९६८ नागरी सत्कार)
- Vishnudas Bhave Puraskar, 1973 (१९७३ विष्णुदास भावे पुरस्कार)
- Bal Gandharva Puraskar, 1983 (१९८३ बालगंधर्व सुवर्णपदक)
- Keshavrao Bhosale Puraskar, 1990 (१९९० केशवराव भोसले पुरस्कार)
- Jagtik Marathi Parishad, Israyal, 1996 (१९९६ जागतिक मराठी परिषद इस्राइल)
- Mahendra Puraskar 1999 (१९९९ महेंद्र पुरस्कार)
- Alpha Jeevan Gaurav Puraskar, 2002 (२००२ अल्फा जीवन गौरव पुरस्कार)
- Sangeet Natak Kala Academy, 2004 (२००४ संगीत नाटक अकादमी राष्ट्रीय पारितोषिक)
- Tanwir Puraskar, 2005 (२००५ तन्वीर पुरस्कार)
- Chaturang Jeevan Gaurav Puraskar, 2006 (चतुरंग जीवन गौरव)
- Prabhakar Panshikar Jeevan-Gaurav Puraskar, 2008 (२००८ महाराष्ट्र राज्य (पणशीकर) जीवन गौरव पुरस्कार)

== Death ==
Bhalchandra Pendharkar died at a private hospital in Mumbai on Tuesday after a brief illness. He was 94.

== Family ==
He has two sons and a daughter. Dhnyanesh Pendharkar is a singer and actor.
