= Krishnaji Gopal Karve =

Indian revolutionary (1897–1910)

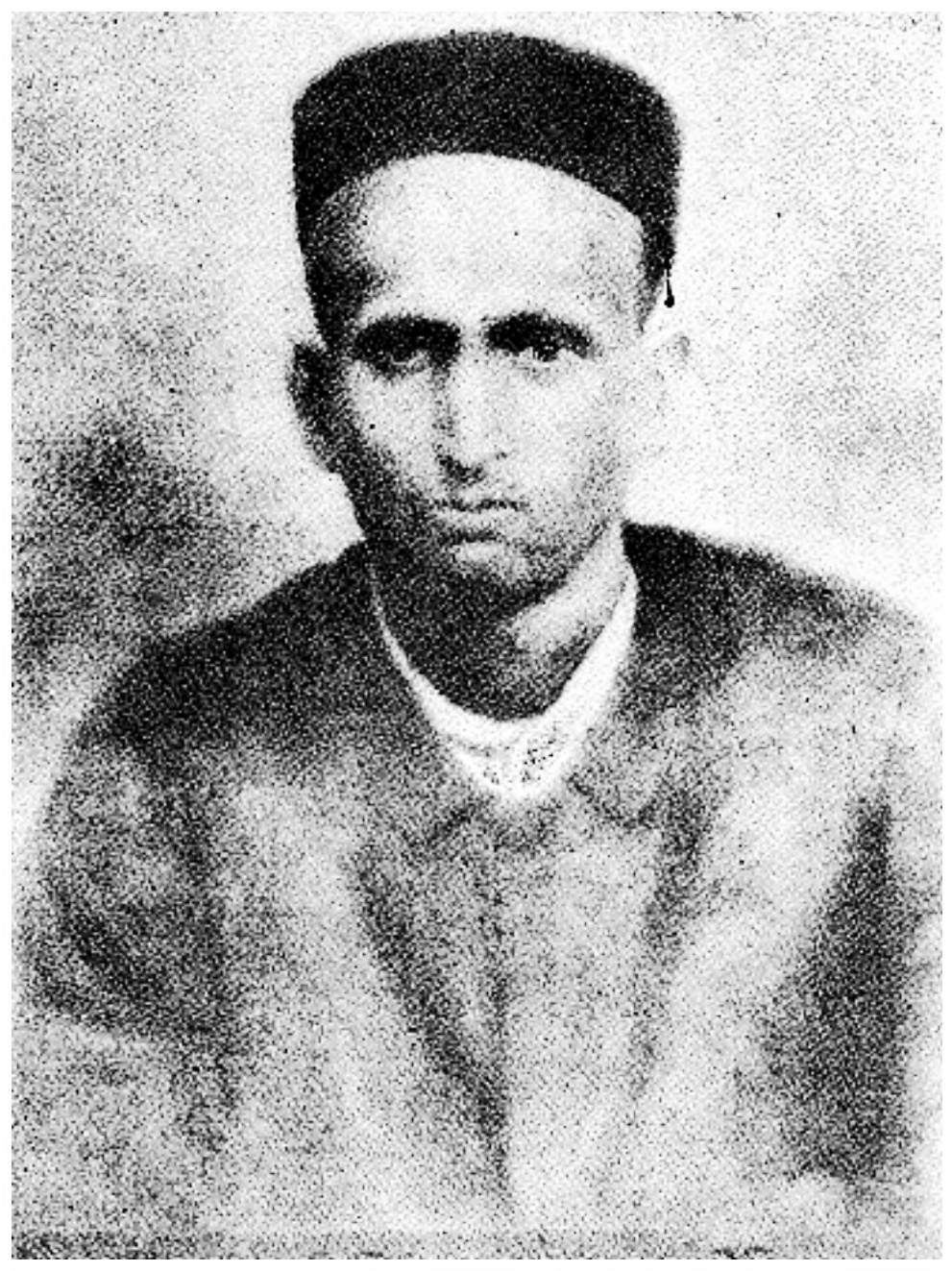
- Krishnaji Gopal Karve
- Born: 1887; Nashik, Bombay Presidency, British India
- Died: 19 April 1910 (aged 23); Thane, India
- Cause of death: hanged
- Other name: Anna Karve
- Education: Bachelor of Arts
- Known for: Indian Independence Movement

Krishnāji Gopāl Karve (1887 – 19 April 1910) was an Indian freedom fighter and revolutionary. He had completed his B.A. (Hons) and had taken admission to LLB in Mumbai University. He was a member of the Abhinav Bharat Society in Nashik. On 21 December 1909, he along with Anant Laxman Kanhere and Vinayak Narayan Deshpande shot Jackson, the Collector of Nashik. He was sentenced to death in the Bombay high court and was hanged in Thane Jail on 19 April 1910.
