= Sangeet Sharada =

1899 Marathi play

- Original language: Marathi
- Written by: Govind Ballal Deval
- Characters: Bhujanganath; Bhadreshwar Dixit; Kodand; Sharada; Kanchanbhat; Indirakaku
- Subject: Child marriage
- Genre: Social

Premiere
- Date: 1899

Sangeet Sharada is an 1899 Marathi Sangeet Natak (Musical play), written and directed by playwright Govind Ballal Deval. The play is considered as the first play in Marathi to showcase the social problems and broke the norms by dealing with the subject of child marriage when dramatic literature in India mainly focused on historical-mythological narrations.

Over the period of time, various stage actors like Bal Gandharva, Vishnupant Pagnis, Bhalchandra Pendharkar have performed the lead role of Sharada. Going with the format of Sangeet Natak, play had more than 50 songs, penned and composed by Govind Ballal Deval himself and music attained a cult status over the period of time.

The play "is considered to be a pioneer in social drama in India" and gained the popularity in such a way that when the Child Marriage Restraint Act, proposed by Haribilas Sarda, also known "Sarda Act", was passed in 1929; it was mistaken to be named after the play as "Sharada Act".

== Plot ==
Bhujanganath, a geriatric widower, wants to marry one more time so that he can have heir to his property, thus befriends Bhadreshwar Dixit, a middleman, who would help him in finding a young bride. Though a well known person in the village, Dixit finds difficulties in getting a bride for Bhujanganath, as nobody agrees for the proposal because of his old age. Dixit convinces Bhujanganath to visit other villages to search for brides and advises him to behave like a wealthy person, which would make it easier to get a bride for Bhujanganath.

Both along with Kodand, a young orphaned Purohit, visit Gangapur and manage to convince people in the village that Bhujanganath is a rich and young man. Kanchanbhat who wishes to marry his young teenage daughter, Sharada, to a rich person hears about Bhujanganath's arrival in the village. He approaches Dixit with the help of one of his friends, Suvarnashastri and readily accepts the proposal when Dixit proposes ₹ 5000 as dowry in marriage. Indirakaku, Kanchanbhat's wife and Sharada's mother, disagrees for the marriage when she learns the truth about Bhujanganath. When Kodand visits Kanchanbhat's house along with Dixit, he opposes the marriage and threatens Dixit and Bhujanganath that he will tell the truth and will also lodge a complaint in the police station as the proposed marriage is planned between an old person and a teenager. Frightened Dixit locks Kodand in the basement.

With Kodand missing, villagers start inquiring about Bhujanganath and Dixit. Sharada, after meeting Bhujanganath in person, opposes for the marriage but her father Kanchanbhat does not pay any heed and starts the preparation for the marriage. With the help of a friend, Kodand manages to escape from the custody.

On the day of marriage, Kodand accompanied by police, reaches the marriage venue and exposes Bhujanganath and Dixit. Police arrests both of them. Sharada runs away from the venue and decides to commit suicide. But Kodand convinces Sharada and proposes her for the marriage. Sharada accepts the proposal and both of them decides to get married.

== Characters ==
The play had number of characters. Some of them even had songs which were rendered by themselves.

- Bhujanganath (Shrimant): a 75-year-old widower
- Kodand: an orphaned Purohit and male protagonist
- Kanchanbhat: Sharada's father
- Janhavi, Sharayu, Vallari, Mandakini, Triveni and Tunga: Sharada's friends
- Bhadreshwar Dixit: a middleman
- Sharada: a teenager, young bride and female protagonist
- Indirakaku: Sharada's mother
- Jayant: Sharada's younger brother
- Hiranyagarbha (Shyamsundar), Suvarnashastri, Shitikanth, Pushkarbhat, Kaustubh, Upadhyay, Kotwal, Bimbacharya, Vetalik, Ramanandcharya, Jagadguru: villagers and other characters

== List of songs ==
The play, being a musical, had plenty of songs. All the songs were penned and composed by Govind Ballal Deval.

Act One

Track #	Title	Character	Notes
01	"Shankarpad Vandi Aadhi"	Chorus	Naandi; Raag: Hameer; Taal: Chautal
02	"Saukhya Purna Devo Tumha"	Chorus	Naandi; Raag: Bahar; Taal: Tintal
03	"Abhiruchi Kona Shringarachi"	Narrator	Saki
04	"Parichit Jo Ya Rasikjana"	Narrator	Saki
05	"Ajuni Khula Ha Naad"	Narrator	Raag: Jhinjoti; Taal: Tintal
06	"Adoor Darshitwane Kewal"	Narrator	Saki
07	"Kaay Purush Chalale Bai"	Narrator	Raag: Pilu; Taal: Tintal
08	"Jarath Ituka Tari"	Narrator	Dindi
09	"Porasah Thor Kiti"	Bhujanganath	–
10	"Nivartali Ti, Tevhapasuni"	Bhujanganath	Katav
11	"Sundar Khashi Subak Thengani"	Bhujanganath	–
12	"Paushtik Balviryajanak Aushadhe"	Bhujanganath	–
13	"Pratakale Shiva Drushtava"	Bhadreshwar	Shlok
14	"Name Bramhan, Khara"	Kodanda	Saki
15	"Jatharanal Shamavaya Neecha"	Kodanda	Raag: Adana; Taal: Tintal
16	"Jo Bhed Vidhine"	Kodanda	–
17	"Ye Kaal Kasa Viparit"	Kodanda	–
18	"Ha Jarathkumarivivah"	Kodanda	–
19	"Anyadharmi Bhoopal Aaryabhucha"	Kodanda	Dindi
20	"Swarthi Ji Preeti Manujachi"	Kodanda	–
21	"Wani Taishi Karni"	Kodanda	Saki
22	"Jari Karin Sakal Khalkarya"	Kodanda	–
23	"Jari Varun Dhuvat Sovala"	Kodanda	–
24	"Baghuni Tya Bhayankar"	Sharada	–
25	"Jan Khulawale, Sakal Ulat Chalale"	Sharada	–
26	"Ish Chinta Nivaril Saari"	Sharada	Taal: Deepchandri
27	"Jaagrut Theva, Lagnachi Hi Smriti"	Kodanda	Taal: Dadra
28	"Jay Krishnatatvasa"	Sharada	Raag: Sarang; Taal: Dadra

Act Two

Track #	Title	Character	Notes
01	"Balpanich Kaal Sukhacha"	Sharada	Taal: Dhumali
02	"Kadhi Karti Lagna Majhe"	Sharada	–
03	"Jari Kuna Shrimantachi"	Indirakaku	–
04	"Tarun Kulin Gora"	Indirakaku	–
05	"Sawala Var Bara"	Kanchanbhat	–
06	"Agadich Tu Vedi"	Kanchanbhat	–
07	"Nako Vivahchi Majala"	Bhujanganath	–
08	"Madhyasthachi Ase Kushalata"	Bhujanganath	–
09	"Mee Nase Jari Bhyaad Jaaticha"	Bhujanganath	Kamada
10	"Maj Game Aisa"	Kodand	–
11	"Bimbadhara, Madhura"	Kodand	–
12	"Bhetato Me Jaavoni Bhrujangala"	Kodand	Dindi
13	"Man Kiti Utavil"	Bhujanganath	–
14	"Naka Karu Avichar"	Kodand	–
15	"Bal Jyache Tyas Te"	Kanchanbhat	–
16	"Swanahun Ati Neech Tumhi"	Kodand	–
17	"Tu Papi Adhamadham Khalakshaay"	Kodand	–
18	"Bhare Kapre, Bhrame Drushti"	Kanchanbhat	Saki

Act Three

Track #	Title	Character	Notes
01	"Gheuni Ye Pankha Valyacha"	Vallari	–
02	"Shrimant Patichi Rani"	Janhavi	–
03	"Tu Shrimantin Khari Shobashil"	Janhavi	–
04	"Mhatara Na Ituka"	Vallari	–
05	"Jarathas Tarun Ho Stree Jari"	Tunga	–
06	"Murtimant Bhitee Ubhi"	Sharada	–
07	"Lagna Hoy Char Diwas"	Bhujanganath	–
08	"Yeil Majhi Bhavi Kanta"	Bhujanganath	–
09	"Kanthi Jhalake Angathi"	Bhujanganath	Dindi
10	"Vaatu Na Yaava Vishad Chitta"	Sharada	–
11	"Khachit Khachit He Nashibanche"	Sharada	–
12	"Drushti Bhare Jalbhor"	Kodand	–
13	"Jo Lokakalyan"	Kodand	–
14	"Kakdrushti Bhadreshwar Ghatak"	Kodand	Saki
15	"Radasi Kaay Mhanuni"	Indirakaku	–
16	"Aamhi Gaayi Jaatichya"	Sharada	–
17	"Tumhi Garib Mhanuni Jari Majha"	Sharada	Raag: Jog; Taal: Dhumali
18	"Yamapasha, Galyashi Jyas Lagala"	Sharada	–
19	"Maya Jalali Ka"	Indirakaku	Raag: Mand; Taal: Dadra
20	"Dilya Taruna Tari Hoti"	Kanchanbhat	Dindi
21	"Tu Taak Chiruni Hi Maan"	Sharada	–

Act Four

Track #	Title	Character	Notes
01	"Lagna Navhe Maran Udya"	Sharada	–
02	"Maagil Janmiche, Atache"	Sharada	–
03	"Koni Kahi Naka Shikavu Aata"	Sharada	–
04	"Pal Ghadi, Ghadi Din Bhasatase"	Bhujanganath	–
05	"Bhalya Manasa, Daslakhachi Goshta"	Bhujanganath	Fatka
06	"Himnag Jo Pashanhriday"	Vallari	–
07	"Vruddhapani Ti Navadara"	Janhavi	–
08	"Jhala Sang Vivah"	Chorus	Sholk
09	"Bramhan Saare Jamala"	Kodand	–
10	"Aadhi Tujhya Ya Dukhane"	Indirakaku	–
11	"Mee Samaju Tari Kaay"	Sharada	–
12	"Mya Lotali Sankati"	Kodand	–

Act Five

Track #	Title	Character	Notes
01	"Ghat Teen Dhanane Bharale"	Kanchanbhat	–
02	"Haal Ikadache Pahavaya Ka"	Indirakaku	–
03	"Nashibi Ase Nach Te Tale"	Indirakaku	Raag: Bhairavi; Taal: Tintal
04	"Te Kutil Kapati"	Kodand	–
05	"Bhumisadan Dhanahin Asa Mee"	Kodand	Saki
06	"Naagini Chapal Khaljivha"	Kodand	–
07	"Saday Shant Asasi Marana"	Sharada	–
08	"Jee Mala Janm De"	Sharada	–
09	"Thamb, Thamb, Karisi Asa"	Kodand	–
10	"Kaay Me Abhagini"	Sharada	Raag: Kanada; Taal: Dadra
11	"Ghei Mam Vachan He"	Kodand	–
12	"Haa Baldiwakar Kari"	Kodand	–
13	"Jevha Vaad Bhara Aala"	Hriranyagarbha	–
14	"Gruhalakshmi Hi Stree"	Jagadguru	Saki
15	"Jarathe Na Vivaha Karava"	Kodand	–
16	"Sumantrimandal Saarvabhaumini"	Chorus	–

== In society ==
Prior to staging of Sangeet Sharada, plays with historical and mythological stories were popular in Marathi theater. With a message to abolish child marriage from society, the play became "a pioneer in social drama in India" in 1899. The show gained popularity in such a way that when Child Marriage Restraint Act, also known as "Sarda Act", was passed, it was mistaken to be named after the play as "Sharada Act". Passed on 28 September 1929, the act was proposed by Haribilas Sarda and was actually called so after his surname.

The songs of the drama still remain popular. The song "Mhatara Ituka na" was used in 2011 Marathi film Balgandharva. Recently in January 2012, a modern version of the play Sangeet Sharada - A Reality Show was staged in Mumbai. The revived play gave a modern perspective to the play. All songs from the original drama were used; some used the new genre of music in them. The play was staged by employees of Municipal Corporation of Greater Mumbai. In 2011, the play was also transliterated into Braille script.

Incidentally, on 21 December 1909 while the play was being performed at the Vijayanand Natyagruha, Nashik, the then British Collector of Nashik, A. M. T. Jackson was shot dead by the freedom fighter Anant Laxman Kanhere. The play was being performed by Annasaheb Kirloskar's Kirloskar Natak Mandali where the lead role of Sharada was being played by Bal Gandharva.
