= Annasaheb Kirloskar =

Indian playwright (1843–1885)

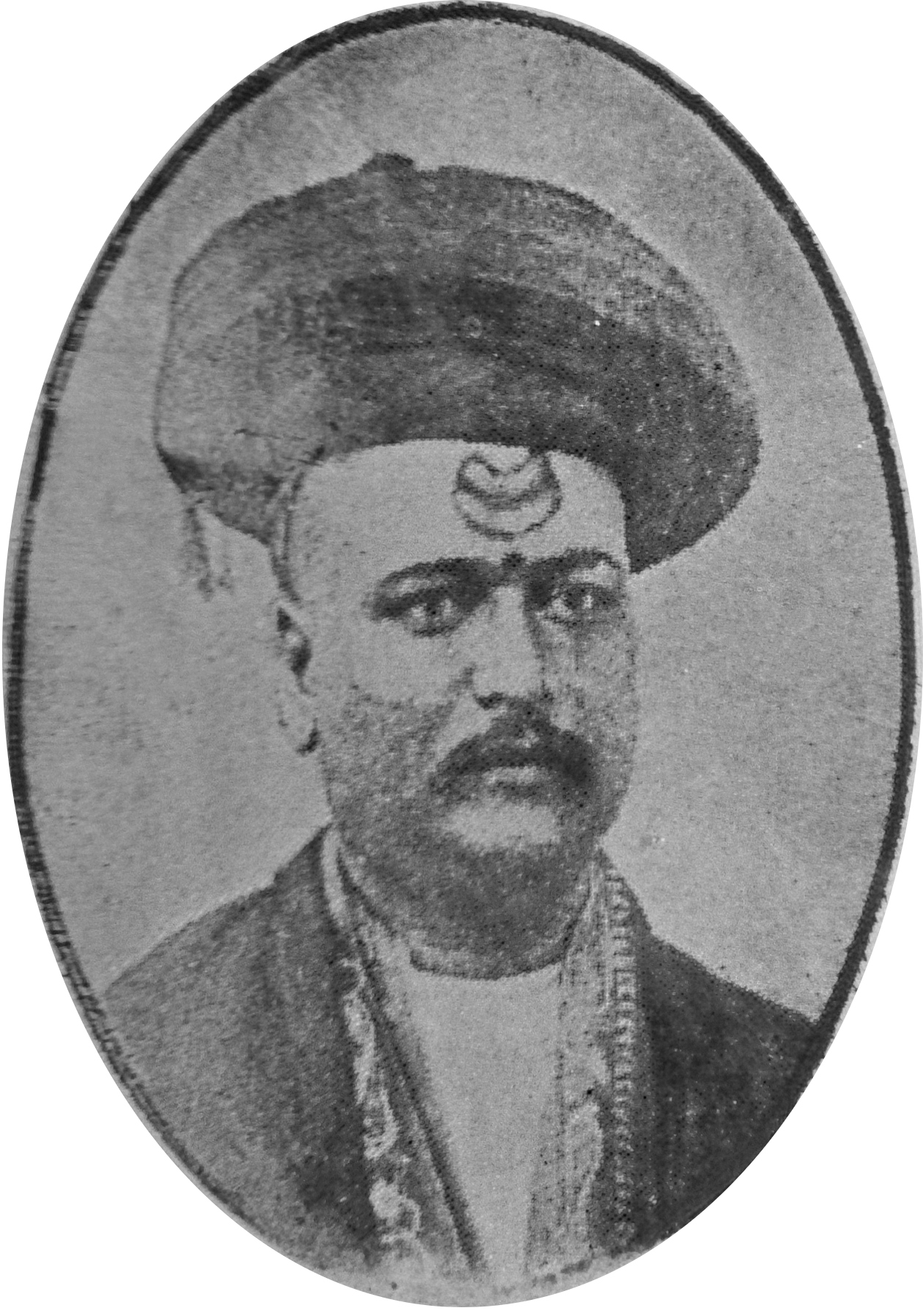
Annasaheb Kirloskar

Balwant Pandurang Kirloskar (31 March 1843 − 2 November 1885), popularly known as Annasaheb Kirloskar, was a Marathi playwright from the Bombay Presidency in British India.

Kirloskar was born on March 31, 1843, at Gurlhosur in Belgaum district to a Karhade Brahmin family. After completing schooling in his native place, at the age of twenty, Annasaheb moved to Pune to pursue further education. His overwhelming interest, however, lay in theatre and he faced parental pressure for his continued disinterest in formal education. His father pressurised him to return to his native Belgaum.

To support himself, Kirloskar then worked for eight years as a school teacher in Belgaum; he subsequently worked for a few years in the police department and then as a clerk in the revenue commissioner's office. Despite his lack of much formal education, Kirloskar was well-versed in Sanskrit literature.

== Marathi theater history ==
In 1843, the same year in which Kirloskar's was born, Vishnudas Bhave pioneered presentation of Marathi plays by staging the play Seeta Swayamwar (सीतास्वयंवर), the Raja of the princely state of Sangli being then in attendance among the audience.

While working as a school teacher in Belgaum, Kirloskar established Bharatshastrottejak Mandali (भरतशास्त्रोत्तेजक मंडळी) in 1866. Seven years later, he completed composition of his first prose play Shri Shankar Digvijay (श्रीशांकर दिग्विजय) for public presentation by Kolhapurkar Natak Mandali (कोल्हापूर नाटक मंडळी). Around 1874, he founded Kirloskar Natak Mandali (किर्लोस्कर नाटक मंडळी).

In 1879, playwright and producer Trilokekar independently presented his musical play Nal-Damayanti (नल-दमयंती) to Marathi public. It was the first musical play on Marathi stage.

=== Shakuntal ===
Kirloskar felt inspired to produce a similar musical play in Marathi in a full-fledged manner. Accordingly, translating into Marathi the first four acts of Kalidas's renowned Sanskrit play Abhidnyan Shakuntalam or "Abhijñānashākuntala" (अभिज्ञानशाकुंतलं), he presented them on stage in 1880 as a musical play titled Shakuntal (शाकुंतल).

The next year, he translated the remaining three acts of Abhidnyan Shakuntalam and staged the entire play. He performed in the play himself.

Kirloskar incredibly included 198 musical pieces in his Marathi Shakuntal. They consisted of a mix of Hindustani and Carnatic classical music, and lighter music.

=== Saubhadra ===
One year later, in 1882, Kirloskar presented on stage his musical Saubhadra (सौभद्र). This play too contained well over 100 musical pieces, and once again he acted in the play.

Because of its multifaceted quality, Saubhadra surpassed even the high popularity of Shakuntal. Innumerable performances of these two plays have been presented by different performing groups to the Marathi audience since their premiere 130 years ago.

=== Ram Rajya Wiyog ===
In 1884, Kirloskar presented to the audience the first three acts of his musical Ram Rajya Wiyog. Before he could finish writing the planned remaining three acts of this play, he died on 2 November 1885 at age 42.

== Marathi theater companies ==
Kirloskar Natak Mandali founded by Anna Saheb in 1880 was the pioneer and breakthrough performing company in Marathi theater. It was the prime performing company in Marathi language until 1913. After Kirloskar's death, it presented plays of Govind Ballal Deval and Shripad Krushna Kolhatkar besides Kirloskar's Shakuntal and Saubhadra. It toured through Maharashtra, Karnataka and Maratha princely states in North India under the British Raj at that time - Indore, Baroda, Gwalior etc. The Mandali had several star singer-actors in its employ, including Bal Gandharva, Govindrao Tembe, Master Krushnarao, and Ganesh Bodas.

Kirloskar Natak Mandali folded around 1935.

Bal Gandharva's Gandharva Natak Mandali; Vasudeorao Dongre's Dongre Mandali; Pandoba Gurav Yavateshwarkar's Waikar Sangeet Mandali; Janubhau Nimkar and Keshavrao Bhosale's Swadesh-Hita-Chintak Mandali, which evolved into Lalit-Kaladarsha Mandali; and Master Dinanath's Balwant Natak Mandali were the other main performing companies which were formed in Maharashtra after 1913.
