= Vishnudas Bhave =

Indian pioneer of Marathi theatre (1819–1901)

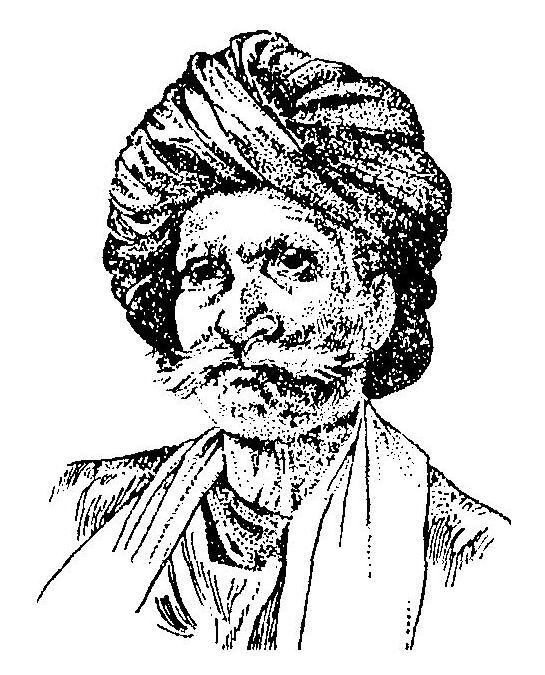
- Born: Vishnu Amrut Bhave; 1818
- Died: 9 August 1901 (aged 82–83)
- Known for: Father of Marathi theatre
- Notable work: Sita Swayamvar (1843)

Vishnu Amrut Bhave (1818 – 9 August 1901), widely known as Vishnudas Bhave, was an Indian theatrical pioneer recognized as the father of Marathi theatre. He established the first drama troupe in Maharashtra to perform plays structured around a definite theatrical concept. Born in Sangli, he staged the first Marathi-language play Sita Swayamvar in Sangli in 1843. Bhave states that this play was inspired by the Yakshagana Bhagavata Mela of Karnataka and the music was composed in Karnataki style.

== Early life ==
Bhave was born in 1818. He served as an employee under Shrimant Chintamanrao, also known as Appasaheb Patwardhan, the ruler of the princely state of Sangli. Bhave possessed a strong personal interest in composing stories and poems.

In 1842, a drama troupe named 'Bhagavat' from Karnataka arrived in Sangli. After witnessing their performances, Appasaheb Patwardhan envisioned creating similar theatrical productions in the Marathi language with certain refinements. The ruler entrusted this developmental task to Bhave.

== Theatrical career and style ==
In 1843, Bhave wrote and successfully staged his first self-composed play, Sita Swayamvar. Following this success, he wrote ten plays based on themes from the Ramayana, which earned widespread acclaim within the Sangli state. He later wrote plays based on stories from the Mahabharata.

Bhave established a distinct presentation format for his plays:

- Opening rituals: A performance commenced with a holy invocation (Mangalacharan) delivered by the narrator (Sutradhara). This was followed by the entry of a jester (Vidushaka) dressed in the attire of a Bhil tribe member.
- Comedic interaction: The narrator and the jester would engage in a humorous dialogue.

Deity Invocations: Devotional prayers (stavan) were offered to the deities Ganapati and Saraswati, after which the main plot of the play would begin.

The narrator remained active from the beginning to the end of the performance, describing the unfolding dramatic scenes through verse. Following these poetic descriptions, the respective characters would enter the stage to deliver their dialogues. The dialogues were not entirely scripted in advance, and actors occasionally improvised their speeches on the spot.

Bhave's productions provided considerable scope for dance and songs (nach-pada). Individual acts or scenes within the plays were referred to as Kacheri.

=== Alternative designations ===
Bhave's plays were known by distinct colloquial names due to specific features of their performance style:

- Tadthom plays: The performances prominently featured the musical accompaniment of the percussion instrument, the pakhavaj. The specific sound generated by this instrument led to the plays being popularly called 'Tadthom' dramas.
- Alal-dhur plays: The demon characters in his productions frequently made a signature roaring sound transliterated as "Alal-dhur", which led to the performances also being designated as 'Alal-dhur' dramas.

== Later years and death ==
Following the death of his patron, Chintamanrao Patwardhan, in 1851, Bhave lost the royal support and patronage of the Sangli state. Consequently, he took complete responsibility for managing his productions and began touring various towns and villages to stage his plays. He remained actively involved in the commercial theatre profession until 1861. Following his retirement from the business, he lived out his remaining days in Sangli, where he died of the plague on 9 August 1901.

== Literary contributions ==
A large portion of Bhave's dramatic work was written in verse, sharing a close stylistic relationship with historical Marathi Akhyan (narrative poetry) literature. His verse compositions, written across a variety of poetic meters for his plays, are termed Natyakhyane. More than fifty of these compositions gained widespread recognition when they were published in 1885 under the title Natyakavitasangrah. In arranging the music for these verses, Bhave effectively utilized a diverse range of classical ragas, raginis, and their combinations to maximize their emotional impact.

== Legacy ==
Vishnudas Bhave is widely regarded as the pioneer of Marathi theatre, and his staging of Sita Swayamvar in 1843 is considered the beginning of the Marathi theatrical tradition. His integration of mythological narratives, music, verse, narration, and stylised performance established a dramatic framework that influenced Marathi theatre for several decades. Later playwrights and theatre practitioners continued to adopt elements of his theatrical idiom, including his verses, songs, and performance conventions.

Bhave's contributions have continued to be recognised through theatre scholarship, commemorative initiatives, and revival productions. Among these was a staging of Seeta-Swayamwar directed by Dr. Praveen Bhole and presented by Lalit Kala Kendra, Savitribai Phule Pune University, reflecting continued engagement with Bhave's pioneering work in Marathi theatre.

=== Vishnudas Bhave Gaurav Padak ===
In memory of Bhave, the Akhil Bharatiya Natya Vidyamandir instituted the Vishnudas Bhave Gaurav Padak, first awarded to Bal Gandharva in 1959. It subsequently became an annual honour presented in Sangli on 5 November (Marathi Rangbhumi Din).
