= Anant Laxman Kanhere =

Indian revolutionary (1892-1910)

Hutatma Anant Laxman Kanhere
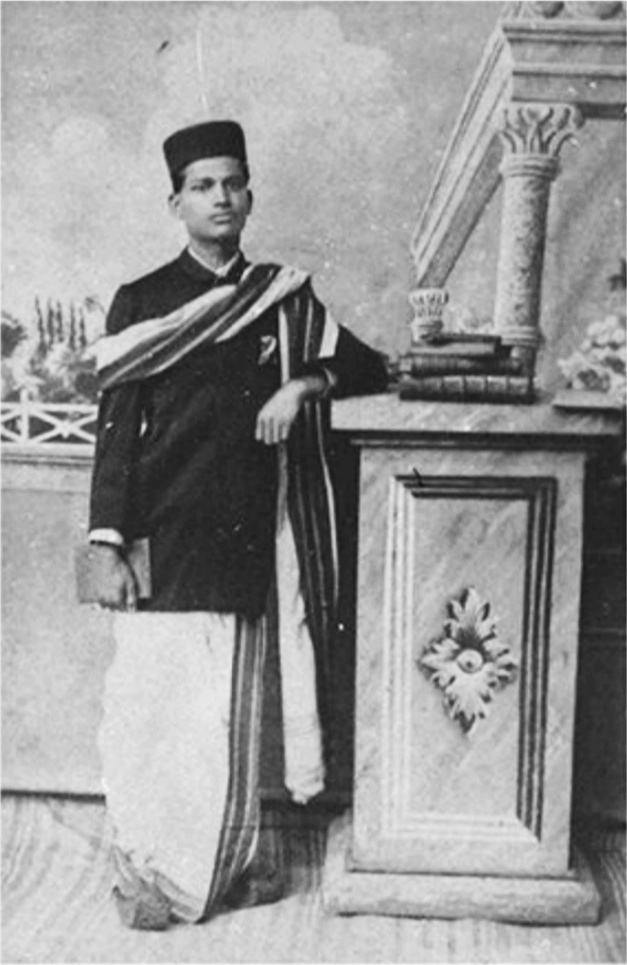
- Anant Laxman Kanhere
- Born: 7 January 1892; Aayani (Anjani), Ratnagiri District, British India
- Died: 19 April 1910 (aged 18); Thane, British India
- Cause of death: Execution by hanging
- Known for: Indian independence movement

Anant Laxman Kanhere (7 January 1892 – 19 April 1910) was an Indian freedom fighter. On 21 December 1909, he shot Arthur Mason Tippetts Jackson, who was the district collector of Nashik in British India. The murder was an important event in the history of Nashik and the Indian revolutionary movement in Maharashtra.

== Background ==
Kanhere was born on 7 January 1892 in Aayani (Anjani), a small village in Khed Taluka, Ratnagiri district in a Chitpavan Brahmin family. He completed his primary education in Nizamabad (which was then also called as Indur), and his English education took place in Chatrapati Sambhaji Nagar(Then Aurangabad). In 1908, Kanhere returned to Chatrapati Sambhaji Nagar where he met with members of secret revolutionary groups. Gangaram had a friend at Yewale named Tonpe. He was member of the secret society of Nashik. One Ganu Vaidya used to visit Yewala to meet his relative. Vaidya and Gangaram once went to purchase a weapon for the Nashik Secret Society. Anant acquainted with this Vaidya at Chatrapati Sambhaji Nagar(Maharashtra).

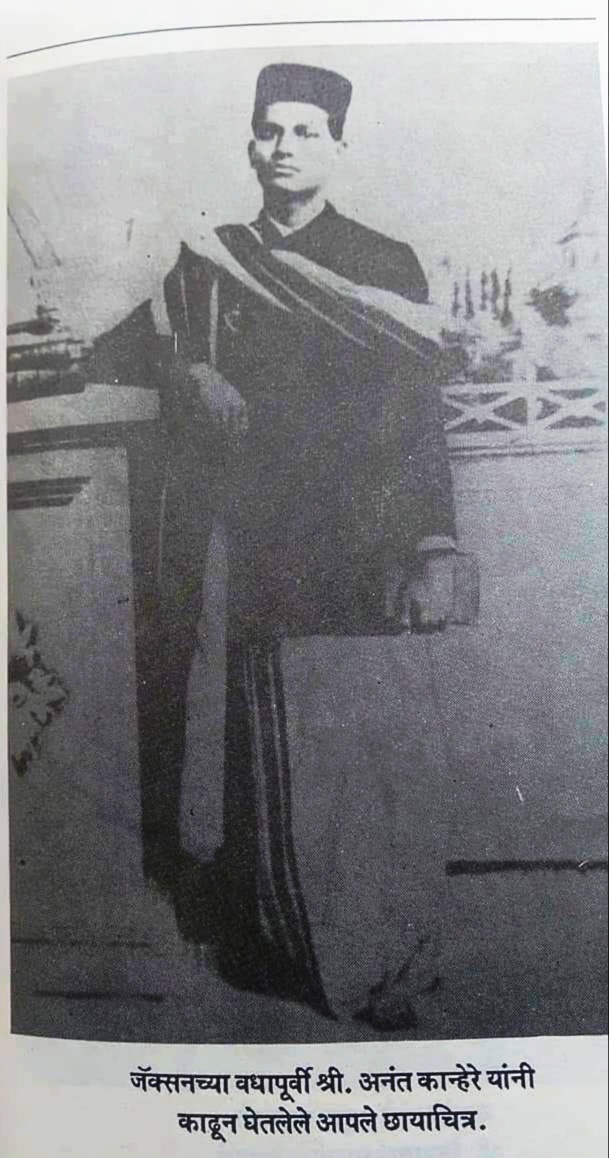
Full photo of Anant Kanhere

== Jackson assassination ==
Jackson, a British officer, was aware of these activities. He started mixing with people, unlike other British officers, and made an image of himself as a people-friendly officer. He told people that he was a Vedic-literate Brahmin in his previous life and that was why he felt affection towards the Indian people. He used to talk to people in Marathi and had knowledge of Sanskrit.

Jackson was alleged to be instrumental in the arrest and prosecution of Babarao Savarkar for printing a sixteen-page book of the songs of Kavi Govind, although this is not confirmed.

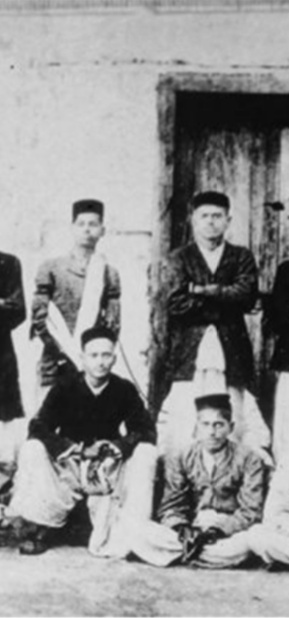
The two men in black coats, revolutionary Krishna Karve (sitting) and Vinayak Deshpande (standing).

A revolutionary group headed by Krishnaji Karve decided to eliminate Jackson in the first month of 1910 in response. However, by the end of 1909, Jackson was promoted to the post of Commissioner of Mumbai. Karve, Vinayak Deshpande, and Kanhere decided to eliminate Jackson before his transfer. People in Nashik arranged a farewell for Jackson at Vijayanand theatre in Nashik and staged the drama Sangeet Sharada in his honour. Kanhere decided that he would kill Jackson and commit suicide by poison to avoid capture and save his other partners. The backup plan was that Deshpande was going to shoot Jackson if Kanhere's attempt failed. If both these failed, Karve was also carrying a weapon.

On 21 December 1909, after Jackson had arrived to see the play, Kanhere jumped in front of him and fired four bullets at him from Browning pistol. Jackson was killed immediately. One of the Indian officers, Mr. Palshikar, and former DSP Mr. Marutrao Toradmal, attacked Kanhere with their batons. Other people present caught Kanhere and he was not able to shoot himself or get the poison. A copy of paper written by Karve named "Murder for Murder" was discovered from him.

Kanhere, now 18, admitted his part in the killing. On 29 March 1910, the Chief Justice of Bombay found him guilty. He was hanged in the Thane Prison on 19 April 1910. Along with Kanhere, Karve and Deshpande were also hanged. The other accused in the case Shankar Ramchandra Soman, Waman alias Daji Narayan Joshi and Ganesh BalajiVaidya were given Transportation of Life (Life imprisonment) punishment and Dattatraya Pandurang Joshi was sent to two years rigorous imprisonment. None of the relatives of these three were present during the executions. Their bodies were burnt by the prison officers rather than being released to the families, and the remaining ash was thrown in the sea near Thane.

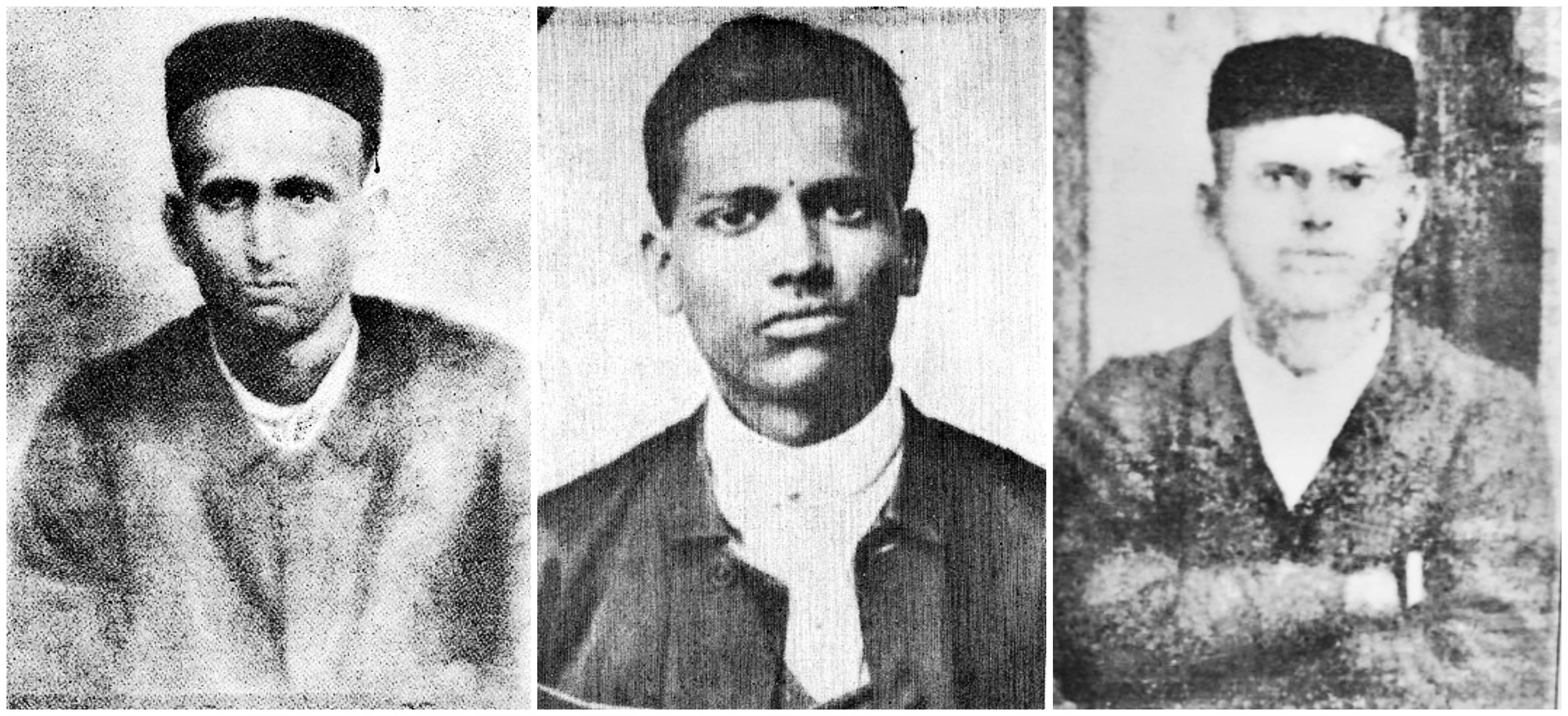
The three revolutionaries of Nasik, Krishna Karve, Anant Kanhere and Vinayak Deshpande

== Legacy ==
- Maharashtrains revere Anant Kanhere as a great martyr, revolutionary.
- A 2014, Marathi film 1909 is based on Anant Kanhere, assassination of Collector Jackson. The initial premier of this film was released on 21 December 2013 on the very same day Jackson was killed at Vijyanand Theatre, Nasik. This is India's oldest theatre and also the exact location where Jackson was killed. The role of Jackson is played by Charles Thomson, an Australian now living in India and working in Bollywood films.
- A major cricket ground in Nashik city is named in Anant Kanhere's honour, it host domestic matches of tournaments such as Ranji trophy.
