= Govind Ballal Deval =

Indian playwright (1855–1916)

Govind Ballal Deval (1855–1916) was a Marathi playwright from Bombay Presidency, British India.

Deval was born in 1855 in a village in the Konkan region of Maharashtra, but he spent his childhood in Haripur near Sangli. He attended a high school in Belgaum, where he came in contact with, and was influenced by, playwright/actor Balwant Pandurang Kirloskar, who worked as a teacher in that school.

After a late high school graduation in 1879 at age 24, Deval worked for a few years as a teacher in the same school, moved to Pune to finish in 1894 a college course in Agriculture, and worked for a short while as a botany school teacher. An elder brother of Deval was a musician, while another brother was an accomplished actor in Ichalkaranjikar Natak Mandali.

== Career ==
While Deval was in high school in Belgaum, he joined Kirloskar's Kirloskar Natak Mandali as an actor after its inception around 1875 and soon became an associate play director there. He even composed the lyrics and music of many of the 198 songs in Kirloskar's play Shakuntal (शाकुंतल), the first half of which was presented to the public in 1880. (Kirloskar presented the complete play the next year.)

After Kirloskar's death in 1885, Deval continued to work for a few years at Kirloskar Natak Mandali as a playwright, an actor, and a play director. After his move to Pune in 1894, he founded Aryoddharak Natak Mandali; and in 1913, three years before his death, he joined Bal Gandharva's newly established Gandharva Natak Mandali.

Deval's disciples in acting included Bhaurao Kolhatkar, Nanasaheb Joglekar, Ganesh Bodas aka Ganpatrao, Kashinathpant Parchure, and Bal Gandharva, all of whom turned out to be well-known actors in Maharashtra in the early part of the 20th century.

== Plays ==
During 1886–1916, Deval wrote and presented to the public seven plays:

- Durga (दुर्गा) (1886) (An adapted version of Thomas Southerne's The Fatal Marriage (or Isabella))
- Mruchchhakatik (मृच्छकटिक) (1887) (An adapted version of Shudrak's Sanskrit play with the same name)
- Vikramorwashiya (विक्रमोर्वशीय) (1889) (An adapted of Kalidas's play with the same name)
- Jhunjarrao (झुंझारराव) (1890) (An adapted version of Shakespeare's Othello)
- Shapa Sambhram (शापसंभ्रम) (1893) (An adapted version of Banabhatta's Kadambari)
- Sangeet Sharada (शारदा) (1899)
- Samshay Kallol (संशयकल्लोळ) (1916) (Based partly on Molière's Sganarelle. This play had been presented to the public by Gandharva Natak Mandali after Deval's death earlier in 1916.)
