= Sangeet Natak =

Drama form that combines prose and poetry as songs

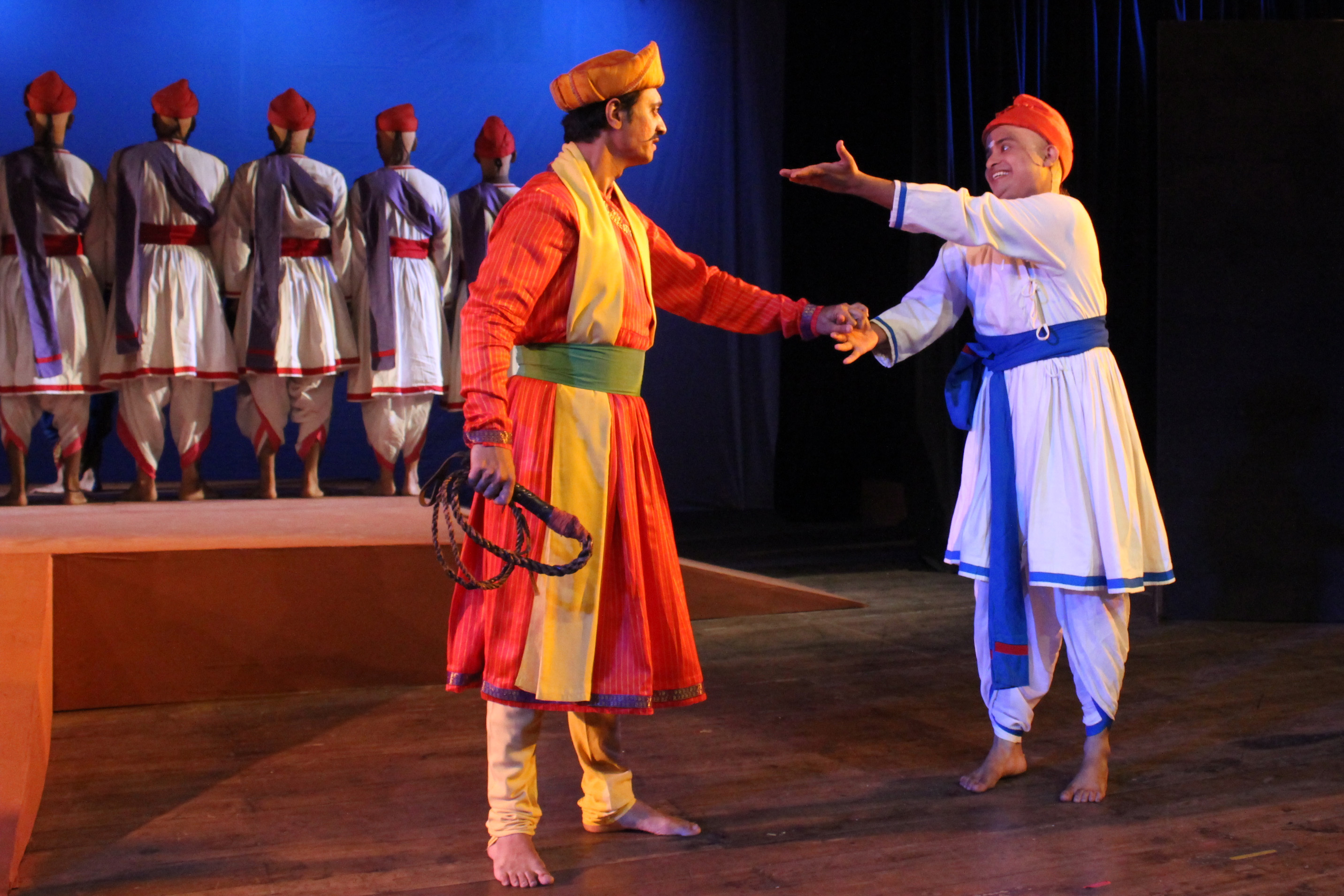
- Ghashiram Kotwal being performed at Bharat Bhavan, Bhopal
- Cultural origins: 19th century Maharashtra

Sangeet Natak (Marathi for 'musical drama') is a form of drama which combines prose and poetry in the form of songs to convey the story, similar to musicals. They have played a vital role in the development of Marathi theater and cinema, as well as the Indian film industry. Sangeet Nataks start with the praise of Lord Natraja, which is called Naandi, Mangalaacharan or Suchakpad – usually the famous "Panchatunda Nararundamaldhar" from Sangeet Shakuntal. They are popular for the use of Indian classical music. The "Dramatic Music" is called Natya Sangeet, one of the two popular forms of vocal arts in Maharashtra and surrounding states. The other is Bhavageet.

== History ==
=== The beginning ===
Vishnudas Bhave is considered the founder of Marathi theater. In 1843, his group staged the first public performance of Marathi play Seeta Swayamvar (सीता स्वयं‍वर). The integration of music in the dramas took place quite late in 1879 when play writer and producer Trilokekar presented his musical play Nal-Damayanti (नल-दमयंती). It was the first musical play on Marathi stage.

But only when Balwant Pandurang Kirloskar (popularly known as Annasaheb Kirloskar) staged his first musical play Shaakuntal, based on Kalidas's play Abhijñānaśākuntalam, on October 31, 1880 in Pune did the trend of Sangeet Natak really start. Kirloskar included 209 musical pieces in his Shaakuntal of 7 acts. They consisted of a mix of Hindustani and Carnatic classical music, and lighter music.

During its early period, Sangeet natak was dominated by religious plays like Sangeet Saubhdra, which is legend in Marathi sangeet natak. The trend changed with coming of sangeet Manapman, which depicts bravery of its hero Dheryadhar and his love with Bhamini which was written by Krushnaji Prabhakar Khadilkar.

=== Golden age ===
The new trend of Sangeet Natakas caught up with the popularity quite quickly. With British Raj then existing in India, Sangeet Natakas were compared with the Operas and thus local Marathi Indians found synonymous recreation. In the blooming times, Sangeet Natakas were mainly based on mythological stories of Mahabharata or Ramayana which would hence easily connect with the masses. They did not cover the complete epics but were limited to only small stories in them.

With popularity & success, experimentation started on stage with abandoning mythological themes and bringing social issues to audiences. Sangeet Sharada, for example, by portraying the feelings of a teenage girl to be married to a widower in his late seventies, brought out a social message. Few dramas, like Kichak Vadh, even agitated the British rulers to the extent that they were banned. Kichak Vadh compared the Britishers with Kichak, an evil character from Mahabharata who tried to dishonour Draupadi. Draupadi was then synonymous with the oppressed common Indian masses.

During the 1960s, another turn came in natya sangeet with the emergence of Jitendra Abhisheki, who was credited with applying simplicity to the complex composition of Natya Sangeet.

=== Plays ===
The recent play Katyar Kaljat Ghusli by Zee studios opened up a new era of musical cinemas. This movie was based on the legendary play bearing the same name. Its music was composed by Jitendra Abhisekhi and sung by Vasantrao Deshpande.

== Notable contributions ==
- Annasaheb Kirloskar who founded the Sangeet Natakas also offered other famous plays like Sangeet Saubhadra and Ramrajyaviyog.

Bal Gandharva's Gandharva Natak Mandali; Vasudeorao Dongre's Dongre Mandali; Pandoba Gurav Yavateshwarkar's Waikar Sangeet Mandali; Janubhau Nimkar and Keshavrao Bhosale's Swadesh-Hita-Chintak Mandali, which evolved into Lalit-Kaladarsha Mandali; and Master Dinanath's Balwant Natak Mandali were the other main performing companies which were formed in Maharashtra.

- Jaymala Shiledar (1926-2013) - Jaymala, her husband Jayaram Shiledar and daughters, Kirti and Lata kept Sangeet natak alive during the lean period of 1960s to 1990s. They staged 25 new musicals, including 'Ekhadyacha Nashib', Mumbaichi Manasa', 'Anantphandi', and Abhogi through their company, Marathi Rangabhoomi. She was a protege of Bal Gandharva.

== Natya Sangeet Maestro ==
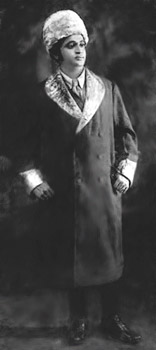
Dinanath Mangeshkar

- Bal Gandharva
- Keshavrao Bhosale
- Deenanath Mangeshkar
- Master Krishnarao
- Pandit Ram Marathe
- Saudagar Nagnath Gore (Chhota Gandharva)
- Prasad Sawkar
- Bhalchandra Pendharkar
- Ramdas Kamat
- Vasantrao Deshpande
- Jitendra Abhisheki
- Jaymala Shiledar
- Jyotsna Bhole
- Manik Varma

== List of famous Sangeet Nataks ==
To attract the audiences, many of the Sangeet Nataks used to prefix the word Sangeet before their actual name.

- Sita Swayamvar
- Shaakuntal
- Sangeet Saubhadra
- Sangeet Maanaapmaan
- Matsyagandha
- Sanyastkhadga
- Kichak Vadh
- Ramrajyaviyog
- Mruchhakatik (1889)
- Sangeet Sanshaykallol
- Katyar Kaljat Ghusli (1967)
- Shapsambhram (1893)
- Sangeet Sharada (1899)
- Sangeet Swayamvar (1916)
- Ghashiram Kotwal
- Devmaanus
- He Bandha Reshmache
- Moruchi Mavshi
- Mandarmala
- Geeta Gati Dnyaneshwar
- Suwarnatula
- Sangeet Vidyaharan
- Ekach Pyaala
- Bhavbandhan
- Madanachi Manjiri
- Punya Prabhav

== See also ==
- Bhavageet
- Natya Sangeet
- Musical theatre
- Opera

== Reading list ==
- Asha Kasbekar (2006). Pop culture India!: media, arts, and lifestyle. ABC-CLIO. pp. 52–53. ISBN 1-85109-636-1.
- Book in Marathi by Govindrao Tembe "माझा संगीत व्यासंग" (My Study of Music) 1939
