= A. M. T. Jackson =

British officer in India (1866–1909)

Arthur Mason Tippetts Jackson
- Born: 1866; United Kingdom
- Died: 21 December 1909 (aged 42–43); Nashik, British India
- Cause of death: Assassinated by Anant Laxman Kanhere
- Occupations: Indian Civil Service officer; Indologist; historian
- Known for: Indological studies, Nashik Conspiracy Case

Arthur Mason Tippetts Jackson (1866 – 21 December 1909) was a British officer in Indian Civil Services. He was a learned Indologist and a historian. He contributed many papers on Indian history, books on folklore and culture and was popularly known as Pandit Jackson. He was the Magistrate of Nasik when he was murdered by Anant Kanhere. The trial in the case led to the arrest and deportation of Vinayak Damodar Savarkar.

== Nasik conspiracy case ==
Anant Laxman Kanhere, an 18-year-old student from Aurangabad, shot Jackson on 21 December 1909 at a theatre where a drama was to be staged in his honour on the eve of his transfer. It has been said that he was shot dead as he had committed Ganesh Savarkar (an Indian freedom-fighter and elder brother of Vinayak Damodar Savarkar) to trial. However, he was sympathetic towards Indian aspirations, was a scholar of Sanskrit and was popular as a man of learning and culture.

The murder created a great deal of sensation in Nashik, Pune and Mumbai and it even created consternation in the ranks of Indian Nationalists, because of Jackson's reputation as a very sympathetic and popular district officer. Though many Indians could not understand why such a good man was murdered the reason is thought to be that Jackson was aware of activities carried by Abhinav Bharat Society which were seditious (as defined by the British Indian government). The arrest of Babarao Savarkar for printing a 16-page book of songs of Kavi Govind and his prosecution was the last straw. Jackson was instrumental in getting Babarao arrested and prosecuted. A group headed by Krishnaji Karve decided to eliminate Jackson in the first month of 1910. However, by the end of 1909, Jackson was promoted to the post of Commissioner of Mumbai. Krishnaji Karve, Vinayak Deshpande, and Anant Kanhere decided to eliminate Jackson before his transfer. People in Nashik arranged a farewell for Jackson at Vijayanand theatre in Nashik and staged a drama, 'Sharada', in his honour. Anant decided this was the time to execute their plan. He took responsibility for killing Jackson and decided to commit suicide by poison to avoid capture, and save his other partners. The backup plan was that Vinayak was going to shoot Jackson if Anant's attempt failed. If both these failed, Karve was also carrying a weapon. On 21 December 1909, Jackson came to see the play named 'Sangeet Sharada'. Anant jumped in front of him and shot four bullets. Jackson was killed immediately. One of the Indian officers, Mr Palshikar and former DSP Mr Marutrao Toradmal, attacked Anant with his baton. Other people around caught Anant and he was not able to shoot himself or get the poison. Anant Kanhere, then 18 years old, was prosecuted in Bombay court and hanged in the Thane prison on 19 April 1910, a mere four months after Jackson was killed. Along with Anant, Krishnaji Karve and Vinayak Deshpande were also hanged. None of the relatives of these three were present during the execution. Their bodies were burnt by the prison officers, rather than being released to the families, and the 'Asthi' (Ash left after the body is burnt) was also not handed over to their relatives, but were thrown in the sea near Thane.
