= Keshavrao Bhosale =

Indian singer and actor (1890–1921)

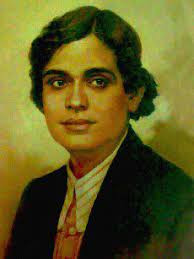
- Born: 4 August 1890; Kolhapur, Bombay State, British India
- Died: 4 August 1921 (aged 31); Pune, India
- Occupations: Singer and actor

Keshavrao Bhosale (9 August 1890 – 4 August 1921) was a prominent Indian singer and actor of Marathi theatre.

== Early and personal life ==
Bhosale was born on 9 August 1890 in Kolhapur. His father was Vitthalrao and his mother was Janabai. His father died during Bhosale's childhood. Due to the impoverished financial circumstances of his family, he was unable to receive a formal school education. Bhosale married twice and had two daughters with his first wife.

== Career ==
During his childhood, Bhosale found an opportunity to work with the "Swadesh Hitachintak" theatre troupe, which developed his initial interest in the dramatic arts. Within this troupe, he received guidance from the theatrical director Janubhau Nimkar. Around the same period, he also underwent classical training under Dattopant Jambhekarbuva.

Initially, Bhosale was cast in minor roles. He gained widespread recognition in 1902 when he portrayed the lead female character in the play Sharada. He left the Swadesh Hitachintak troupe in 1907 and, on 1 January 1908, established his own theatre company named "Lalit Kaladarsh Sangeet Natak Mandali" in Hubli. The organization initially staged older plays such as Sharada and Saubhadra.

Bhosale later commissioned the writer Veer Vamanrao Joshi to write the play Rakshasi Mahatvakanksha. Staged in 1913, the production became highly successful, with Bhosale receiving acclaim for his performance in the female role of Mrinalini. Around this time, he also studied music under Gayanacharya Ramkrishnabuwa Vaze to attain proficiency in the art of singing.

Later in his career, Bhosale transitioned away from playing female characters to perform male roles. His performances as the lead hero in productions such as Hach Mulacha Bap, Sanyashacha Sansar, and Shahashivaji became highly celebrated. His portrayal of the character Dhairyadhar in the play Manapman, along with the songs he performed in it, achieved significant fame.

== Vocal style ==
Bhosale's singing was characterized by a distinct ability to effortlessly reach high pitches and deliver impactful vocal phrases (taans).

== Death ==
Bhosale contracted typhoid fever and died in Pune on 4 August 1921 at the age of 32.
