= Bal Gandharva =

Indian Marathi singer and stage actor (1888–1967)

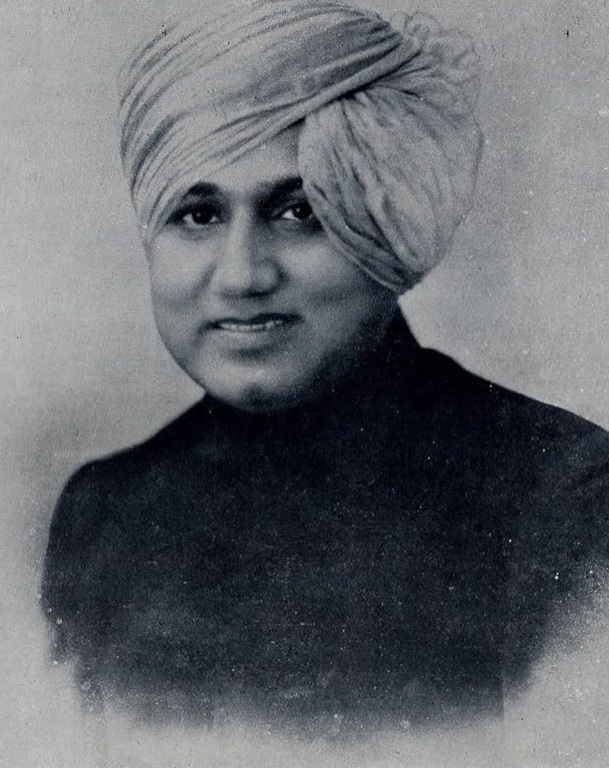
- Narayan Shripad Rajhans alias Bal Gandharva

Background information
- Born: Narayan Shripad Rajhans; 26 June 1888; Nagthane, Palus taluka, Sangli, Maharashtra Bombay Presidency, British India
- Died: 15 July 1967 (aged 79) Pune, Maharashtra, India
- Genres: Musicals (Sangeet Natak)
- Occupations: Singer and stage actor
- Years active: 1905–1955

Narayan Shripad Rajhans, popularly known as Bal Gandharva, (26 June 1888 – 15 July 1967) was a famous Marathi singer and stage actor. He was known for his roles as female characters in Marathi plays, since women were not allowed to act on stage during his time.

Bal Gandharva got his name after a singing performance in Pune. Lokmanya Tilak, a social reformer and a freedom fighter of the Indian independence movement was in the audience, and after the performance, reportedly patted Rajhans on the back and said that Narayan was a "Bal Gandharva" (lit. Young Gandharva).

== Personal life ==
Narayan Shripad Rajhans was born into a Deshastha Brahmin family to Shripad Rajhans and his wife Annapurnabai Rajhans. He was born in the Nagthane village of Palus taluka of Sangli district in what is now the state of Maharashtra.

Bal Gandharva married twice. At a very young age, he was married to Lakshmibai, a lady from his own Deshastha Brahmin community and hailing from a respectable family with similar background, in a match arranged by their parents in the usual Indian tradition. The marriage, which was entirely harmonious and conventional, lasted until the death of Lakshmibai in 1940, after more than thirty-five years of marriage. Eleven years later, in 1951, Bal Gandharva married Gauharbai Karnataki (perhaps better known simply as Gohar Bai, and not to be confused with Gauhar Jaan Indian dancer from Kolkata), sister of the famous singer-actress Amirbai Karnataki. Gauharbai hailed from a family full of singers and dancers, and was a Muslim. She had made a career for herself as a stage actress with help of singing skills, and had worked with Narayanraao in theatrical productions, which is how they had fallen in love with each other. The marriage of a woman of her background and religion with a Brahmin gentleman was deeply unacceptable in society. Gauharbai was never received into polite society or acknowledged by any member of Narayanrao's family. The marriage remained childless, and Goharbai died in the year of 1964, three years before when Bal Gandharva died.

== Theatre career ==
Narayan Rajhans was born into an ordinary family. He started his singing career at a very young age singing bhajans. Shahu Maharaj of Kolhapur noticed his talent and was important in getting young Narayanrao's theatre career off the ground. Shahu Maharaj helped him get treatment for his hearing problems at Miraj Hospital. Shahu Maharaj also introduced him to Kirloskar Mandali, the premier Marathi Musical theatre company of that era.

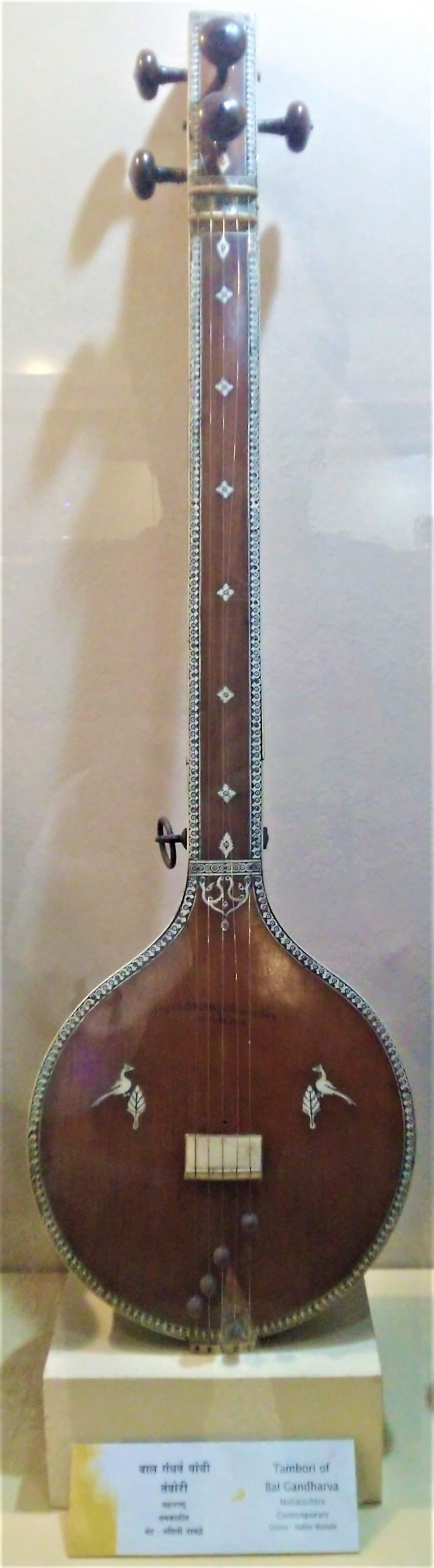
Tamboori of Gandharva in the collection of Raja Dinkar Kelkar Museum, Pune

He started his career with Kirloskar Natak Mandali in 1905. The company was run by Mujumdar and Nanasaheb Joglekar. After Joglekar's death in 1911, there was discontent surrounding Mujumdar's dictatorial and manipulative style. Bal Gandharva, Ganesh Govind ('Ganpatrao') Bodas and Govindrao Tembe left the company in 1913 to form Gandharva Sangeet Mandali. Bal Gandharva became the sole owner of the debt ridden company in 1921. The debt was paid off in seven years' time. However, Narayanrao, dissolved the company when it again accumulated debt over the next 6–7 years. Bal Gandharva signed a contract with Prabhat Film Company to make six films. However, the contract came to an end after just one film Dharmatma (1935). The film was a major departure for Bal Gandharva in the sense that he played the main role of Sant Eknath.

Bal Gandharva revived his drama company in 1937. With Narayanrao increasingly ill at ease in female roles owing to his advancing years, the company looked for an actress to play female roles and found Gohar Karnataki in April 1938. Bal Gandharva soon formed an intimate relationship with Gohar Karnataki, also known as Gauhar Bai, that scandalized traditional Maharashtrian society at that time. His brother Bapurao Rajhans left the company to protest against Gohar's entry in Gandharva Sangeet Mandali and Bal Gandharva's life, when it became clear that Gohar would have a major say in the company's stewardship.

Bal Gandharva acted in 27 classic Marathi plays and played a big part in making Sangeet Natak (musicals) and Natya Sangeet (the music in those musicals) popular among common masses. He was a disciple of Bhaskarbuwa Bakhale. Bakhale scored music for his drama Swayamwar. Govindrao Tembe scored music for Manapman. In later years, Bal Gandharva's composer of choice was Master Krishnarao (Krishnarao Phulambrikar).

The songs rendered by him are regarded as classics of Marathi Natya Sangeet and his singing style is greatly appreciated by Marathi critics and audiences. The Marathi stage was facing difficult times after the death of Bhaurao Kolhatkar in 1901. Bal Gandharva revived it. His famous contemporaries include Keshavrao Bhosale (known as "Sangeet-Surya") and Deenanath Mangeshkar.

He acted in plays written by Annasaheb Kirloskar, Govind Ballal Deval, Shripad Krushna Kolhatkar, Krushnaji Prabhakar Khadilkar, Ram Ganesh Gadkari, Vasant Shantaram Desai.

Bal Gandharva died on 15 July 1967.

== Legacy ==
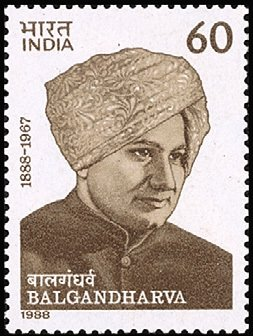
1988 Indian Postage stamp of Balgandharva

- Bal Gandharva Ranga Mandir, a theatre auditorium in the city of Pune was named in his honour. It was built by Pune Corporation in 1968 with the initiative of the famous Marathi author and Balgandharva's fan, P. L. Deshpande {Purushottam Laxman Deshpande}. It was inaugurated by Acharya Pralhad Keshav Atre. Balgandharva's very own hands contributed to the foundation of this play theatre, while he was alive.
- The movie Balgandharva portraying the life-journey of Balgandharva was released by Chandrakant Productions in May 2011.

== Roles ==
His famous roles include :

- Bhamini in Manapman(1911)
- Rukmini in Swayamwar(1916)
- Sindhu in Ekach Pyala(1920)
- Sharada in Sangeet Sharada(1909)
- Vasantsena in Mruchchakatika

== Awards ==
- In 1955, Bal Gandharva received the coveted "President's Award", now known as the Sangeet Natak Akademi Award, the highest musical honour in India from the then President of India.
- In 1964, Bal Gandharva received The Padma Bhushan Award, the third highest civilian award in the Republic of India.

== Biography ==
- Bal Gandharva: the nonpareil thespian Author- Mohan Nadkarni, Publisher-National Book Trust, 2002, Length – 77 pages
- Balgandharva and the Marathi theatre Author- Dnyaneshwar Nadkarni, Publisher- Roopak Books, 1988, Length- 159 pages
- Asa Balgandharva Author- Abhiram Bhadkamkar, publisher- Rajhans Prakashan, 2011, length- 416 pages

== Also read ==
- Sangeet Natak
- Natya Sangeet
- Balgandharva Film
