= Ganpatrao Bodas =

Indian actor (1880–1965)

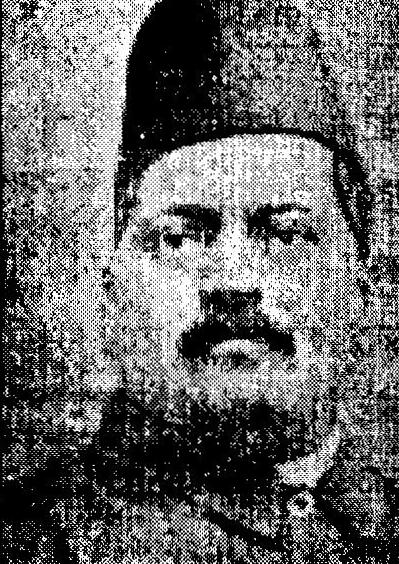
- Born: Ganesh Govind Bodas; 2 July 1880; Shevgaon, Ahmednagar district
- Died: 23 December 1965 (aged 85); Poona
- Occupation: Stage actor

Ganpatrao Bodas (born Ganesh Govind Bodas; 2 July 1880 – 23 December 1965) was an Indian stage actor known for performing Marathi plays.

== Early life and education ==
Ganesh Govind Bodas was born on 2 July 1880 in Shevgaon, located in the Ahmednagar district. His father, Govind Vinayak Bodas, participated in local mythological plays, and his mother was Sagunabai. He was married to Annapurnabai.

Bodas completed his schooling in Poona, where he studied up to the sixth standard in Marathi and the second standard in English.

== Career ==
While still a student, Bodas began performing with amateur theatre groups. In 1895, he joined the Kirloskar Sangeet Mandali, where he initially spent a few years playing supporting female roles. Over time, he transitioned to prominent characters, gaining appreciation for performances such as Krishna in Saubhadra, Kanchanbhat in Sharada, Vikrant in Mooknayak, and Lakshmidhar in Manapaman.

In 1913, Bodas left the Kirloskar Mandali. With the cooperation of Bal Gandharva and Govindrao Tembe, he co-founded the Gandharva Natak Mandali. Under this company, numerous notable plays were brought to the stage, including Saubhadra, Mrcchakatika, Manapaman, Vidyaharan, Sanshay Kallol, Swayamvar, Ekach Pyala, and Draupadi. Bodas achieved significant fame for his portrayals of specific characters in these productions, most notably, Sudhakar in Ekach Pyala, Lakshmidhar in Manapaman, Shakar in Mrcchakatika, Shishyavar in Vidyaharan, and Phalgunrao in Sanshay Kallol.

Following a decline in the popularity of Marathi theatre after 1930, Bodas retired from the professional stage. He later acted in one or two films, though he did not find the medium fully engaging or fulfilling. In his later years, he dedicated his time to mentoring and guiding other actors.

== Honours ==
Bodas spent around forty years dominating the Marathi stage, earning widespread respect in the theatre community. His contributions were recognized through various honours:

- In 1940, he presided over the 31st Natya Sammelan held in Nashik.
- In 1956, he served as the president of the Marathwada Natya Sammelan in Nanded.
- In 1956, he was presented with the Sangeet Natak Akademi Award in Delhi by the President of India.

His autobiography, titled Majhi Bhumika, was originally published in 1940. A revised edition of the book was later released in 1964.
