= List of Marathi film actresses =

This is a list of Marathi cinema actresses. Marathi cinema refers to Indian films produced in Marathi, the language of the state of Maharashtra, India. Based in old Mumbai, it is the oldest and one of the pioneer film industries of India.

The following are some of the most popular Indian actresses of their decades:

A glimpse of the many celebrated actresses of Marathi cinema over the decades

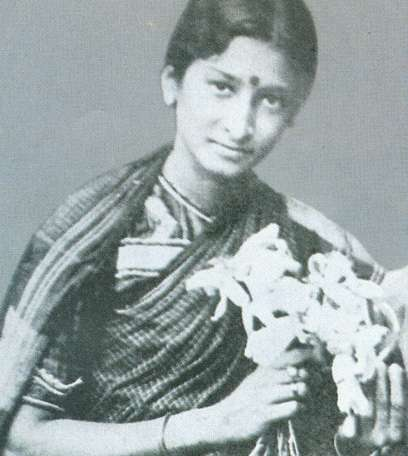
1910s: Kamlabai Gokhale

1920s: Lalita Pawar

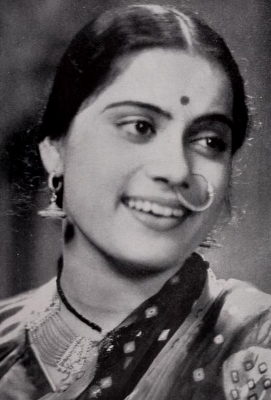
1930s: Shanta Apte

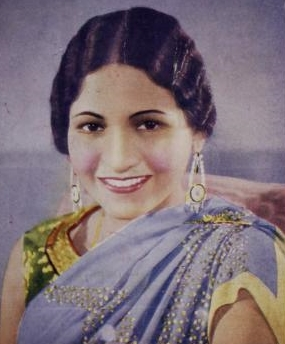
1940s: Hansa Wadkar

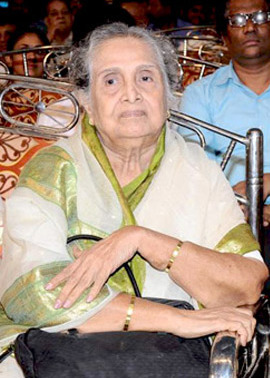
1950s: Sulochana

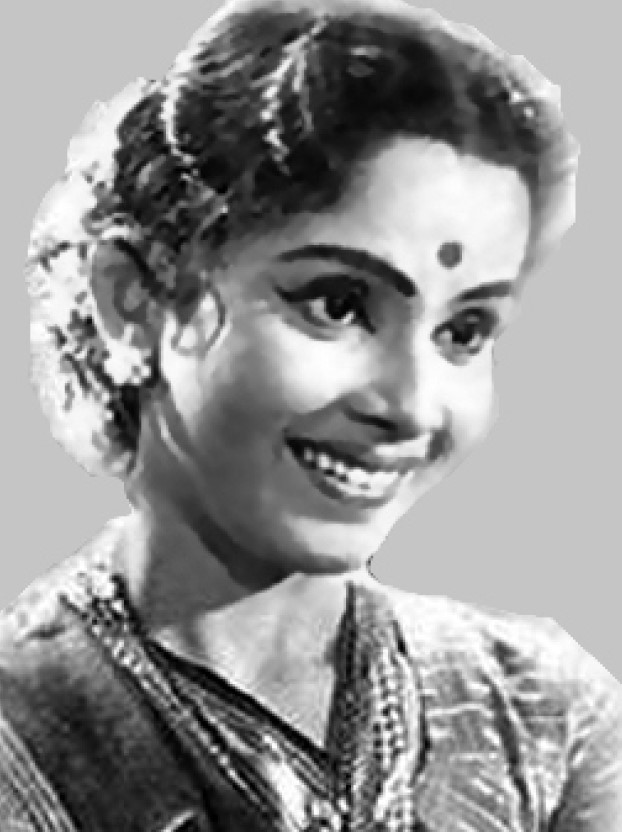
1960s: Jayshree Gadkar

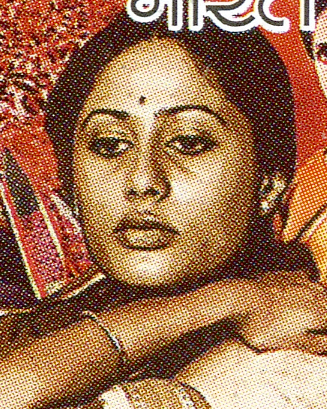
1970s: Smita Patil

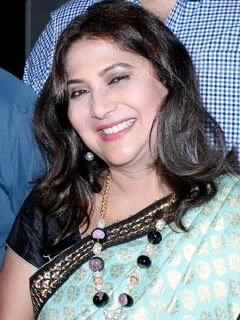
1980s: Nivedita Saraf

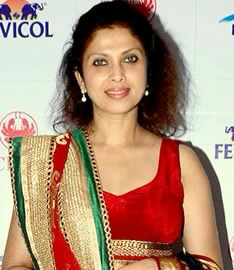
1990s: Varsha Usgaonkar

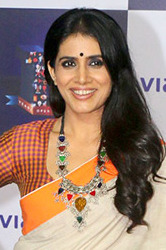
2000s: Sonali Kulkarni

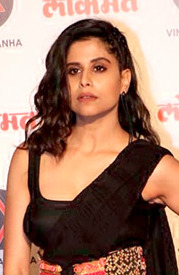
2010s: Sai Tamhankar

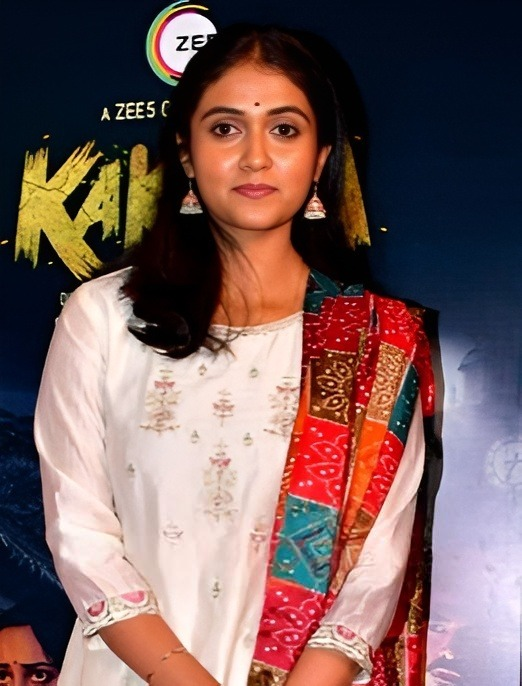
2020s: Rinku Rajguru

In the earliest days of Indian cinema, social taboos meant that men played female roles both onstage and onscreen. This changed in 1913, when pioneering filmmaker Dadasaheb Phalke cast Durgabai Kamat and her daughter Kamlabai Gokhale in Mohini Bhasmasur, making them the first female actors to appear in an Indian film. By the 1930s, the arrival of "talkies" brought the rise of the studio era, led by the Prabhat Film Company. During this period, Durga Khote emerged as a leading figure; coming from a respectable, educated background, she was credited with bringing a new level of social acceptance to the acting profession. At the same time, performers such as Shanta Apte, Hansa Wadkar, and Shanta Hublikar became known as "singing stars," drawing on their musical training in socially reformist films such as Kunku (1937) and Manoos (1939). The 1940s were marked by the influence of Meenakshi Shirodkar, who became a trailblazer as the first Marathi actress to appear on screen in a swimsuit, in the 1938 film Brahmachari. Other prominent actresses of the decade included Nalini Jaywant, Sumati Gupte-Joglekar, and Shakuntala Bhome, who were central to the era's cinematic output.

By the 1950s, Sulochana Latkar emerged as a leading and influential figure in Marathi cinema, recognised for her grace and the emotional depth of her performances. During this "Golden Age," the industry saw the rise of several other prominent actresses, including Shashikala, Kamini Kadam, Sandhya Shantaram, Nanda, Rekha, Leela Gandhi, and Usha Kiran. Sandhya became known for her collaborations with V. Shantaram, while Usha Kiran received acclaim for her work in social dramas. In the 1960s, Jayshree Gadkar was the leading superstar of Marathi cinema, serving as the industry's most recognisable face. Other highly successful actresses of the period included Seema Deo, Uma Bhende, and Padma Chavan, Jeevankala as well as the continued presence of Latkar. These actresses helped define the "Golden Age" of Marathi film through both urban social dramas and rural folk-based narratives.

The 1970s marked a significant period in Marathi cinema, with Usha Chavan becoming a household name through her frequent and successful collaborations with filmmaker Dada Kondke. Alongside her, the decade featured the arrival of Ranjana and Asha Kale, who became major commercial forces. Smita Patil also gained prominence during this time for her contributions to both mainstream and parallel cinema. Other notable actresses of the 1970s included Sushama Shiromanee, Usha Naik, Kanan Kaushal and Sulabha Deshpande. The 1980s were characterised by the popularity of Varsha Usgaonkar, who brought a new sense of style and glamour to the Marathi screen. Alka Kubal became closely associated with emotional family dramas, frequently cast as the wronged or long-suffering woman, a persona cemented by Maherchi Sadi (1991). Nivedita Saraf built her following through popular commercial comedies, while Madhu Kambikar and Priya Berde were noted for their rural, folk-rooted roles. They were joined by Supriya Pilgaonkar and Savita Prabhune among the decade's other notable talents.

The 1990s saw the rise of Sonali Kulkarni and Ashwini Bhave, both of whom became prominent figures by balancing regional success with national recognition. They were part of a diverse group of actresses that included Sukanya Kulkarni, Nishigandha Wad, Neena Kulkarni, Resham Tipnis, Mrinal Kulkarni, Prateeksha Lonkar and Aishwarya Narkar. The 2000s were defined by the emergence of Mukta Barve, whose performances were noted for redefining contemporary female roles. She was joined by other notable actresses such as Madhura Velankar, Kranti Redkar, Amruta Subhash, and Kishori Godbole. Amruta Khanvilkar, Sai Tamhankar, and Sonalee Kulkarni brought glamour and a modern screen presence to the industry, and continued to grow in popularity well into the following decades. In the 2010s, Priya Bapat, Urmila Kanetkar, Mrunmayee Deshpande, Pooja Sawant, and Prarthana Behere emerged as prominent names of the decade. In the late 2010s, Vaidehi Parshurami emerged as a fresh addition to this talented group. The 2020s began with Genelia Deshmukh, Sayali Sanjeev, Prajakta Mali, Hruta Durgule, Hemal Ingle and Priyadarshini Indalkar stepping into the spotlight, even as Rinku Rajguru went on to maintain her status as a cultural icon following her breakthrough earlier in the decade.

== 1910s ==
Year	Name	Debut film	Other notable films
1913	Durgabai Kamat	Mohini Bhasmasur	
1913	Kamlabai Gokhale	Mohini Bhasmasur	
1919	Tara Koregaonkar	Kabir Kamal	Kalidas (1922)

== 1920s ==
Year	Name	Debut film	Other notable films
1920	Kamala Devi	Sairandhri	Savkari Pash (1925), Gajgouri (1926), Bhakta Pralhad (1926), Rani Saheba (1930)
1923	Charu Bai	Guru Dronacharya	
1925	Krishna Chauhan	Simantak Mani	Satyabhama (1925)
1925	Yamuna Gole	Hidimb Bakasur Wadh	Kichak Wadha (1926), Bhakta Pralhad (1926)
1927	Gangubai Mohite	Rukamangada Mohini	
1927	Sushila Bai	Netaji Palkar	Muraliwala (1927)
1928	Ashrabai	Parshuram	
1928	Lalita Pawar	Raja Harishchandra	Netaji Palkar (1939), Ram Shastri (1930)
1929	Shakuntala Tembe	Sant Mirabai	
1929	Sakribai	Gopal Krishna	

== 1930s ==
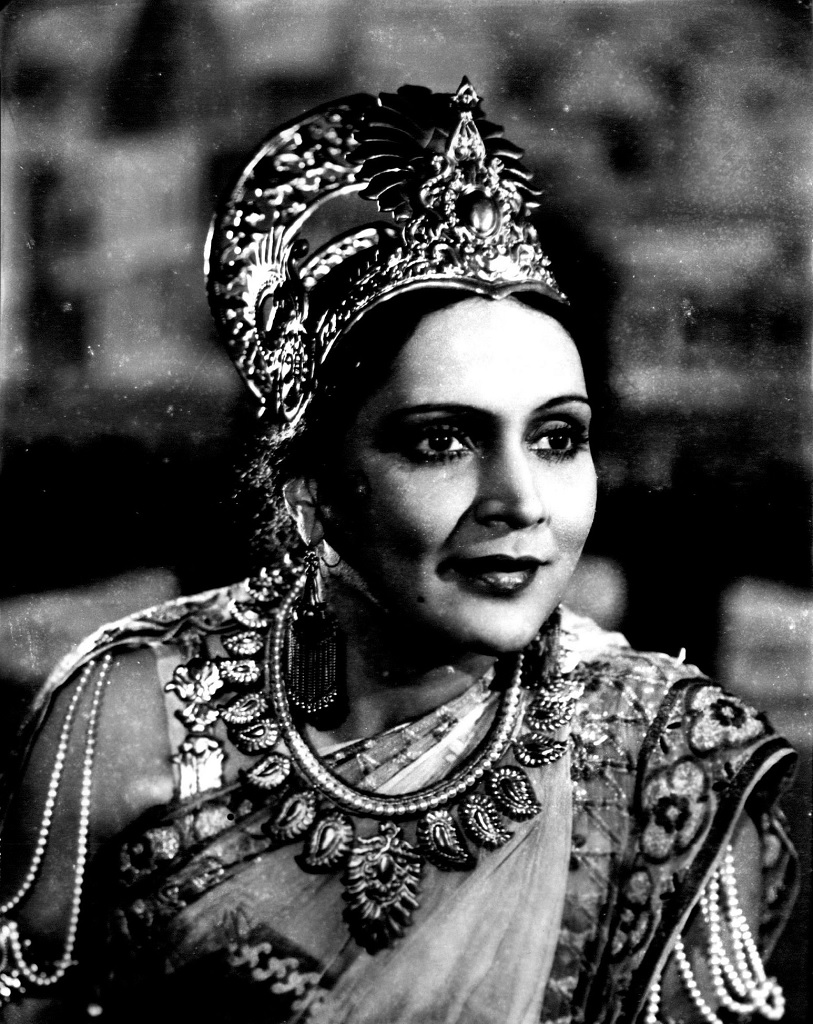
Durga Khote

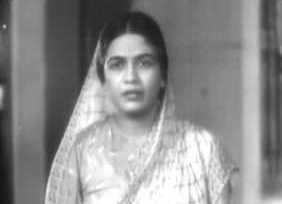
Shakuntala Paranjpye

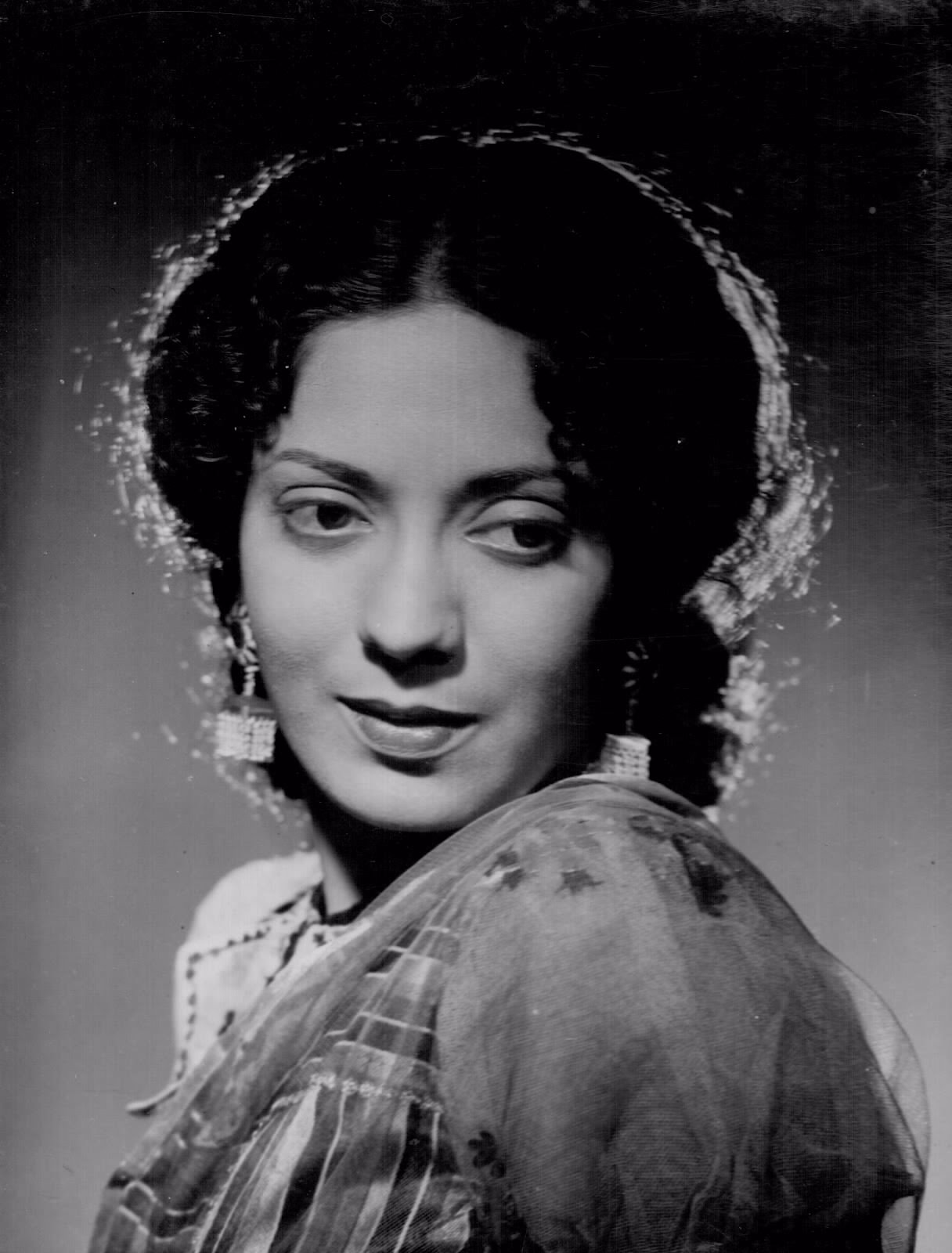
Leela Chitnis

Shanta Hublikar

Year	Name	Debut film	Other notable films
1930	Nalini Tarkhad	Vasantsena	Amrit Manthan (1934), Chandrasena (1935)
1931	Lilavati Pendharkar	Chandrasena	Agnikankan: Branded Oath (1932),
1932	Shanta Apte	Shyamsunder	Amrit Manthan (1934), Kunku (1937), Gopal Krishna (1938)
1932	Durga Khote	Alakh Niranjan	Ayodhyecha Raja (1932), Geeta (1940), Payachi Dasi (1941)
1933	Shakuntala Paranjpye	Sairandhri	Ram Shastri (1944)
1935	Usha Mantri	Usha	Ratnavali (1945)
1935	Ratnaprabha	Usha	Dharmatma (1935), Dharmaveer (1937), Jwala (1938)
1935	Shobhna Samarth	Vilasi Ishwar	Taramati (1945)
1935	Vasanti	Dharmatma	
1935	Tara	Naganand	
1936	Indira Wadkar	Chhaya	Devata (1939)
1936	Leela Chitnis	Chhaya	Sant Tulsidas (1939)
1936	Hansa Wadkar	Vijaychi Lagne	Sant Sakhu (1941), Lokshahir Ram Joshi (1947), Sangtye Aika (1959)
1936	Gauri	Sant Tukaram	Sant Sakhu (1941)
1936	Santa Mujumbar	Sant Tukaram	
1937	Kusum Deshpande	Gangavataran	Payachi Dasi (1941)
1938	Meenakshi Shirodkar	Brahmachari	Lapandav (1940), Ram Shastri (1944)
1938	Shanta Hublikar	Mazha Mulga	Manoos (1939), Pahila Palna (1942)
1939	Ratnamala	Mazi Ladki	Songadya (1971), Ekta Jeev Sadashiv (1972), Pandu Havaldar (1975)

== 1940s ==
Vanamala

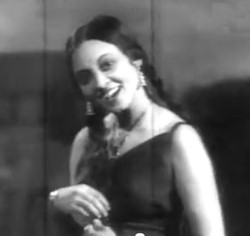
Meenakshi Shirodkar

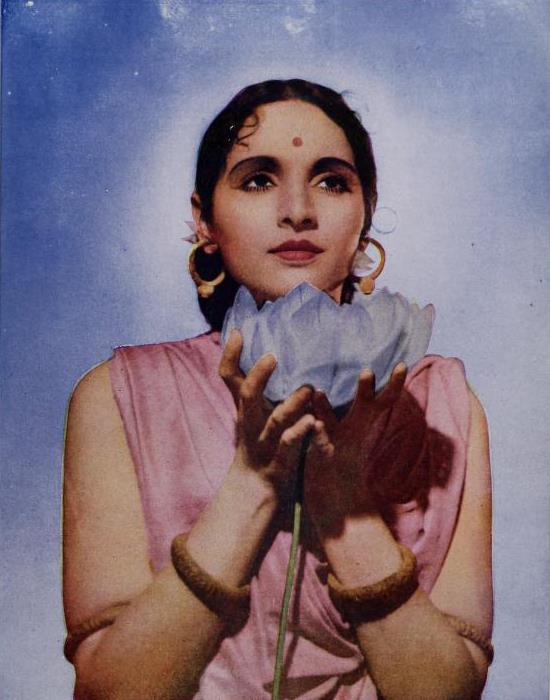
Shobhana Samarth

Sumati Gupte

Year	Name	Debut film	Other notable films
1940	Vanamala	Lapandav	Shyamchi Aai (1953)
1940	Shakuntala Bhome	Lagna Karave Pahun	Sarkari Pahuna (1942)
1941	Sumati Gupte-Joglekar	Thoratanchi Kamla	Sant Dnyaneshwar
1941	Indira Chitnis	Thoratanchi Kamla	
1941	Nalini Jaywant	Nirdosh	
1942	Lata Mangeshkar	Pahili Mangalagaur	
1943	Nalini Dhere	Paisa Bolto Aahe	
1946	Sulochana Latkar	Sasurvas	Jivacha Sakha (1948), Vahinichya Bangdya (1953), Sukhache Sobti (1958), Meeth Bhakar (1959), Sangtye Aika (1959), Laxmi Ali Ghara (1965)
1947	Usha Kiran	Kuber	Krantiveer Vasudev Balwant (1950), Jasas Tase (1951)

== 1950s ==
Usha Kiran

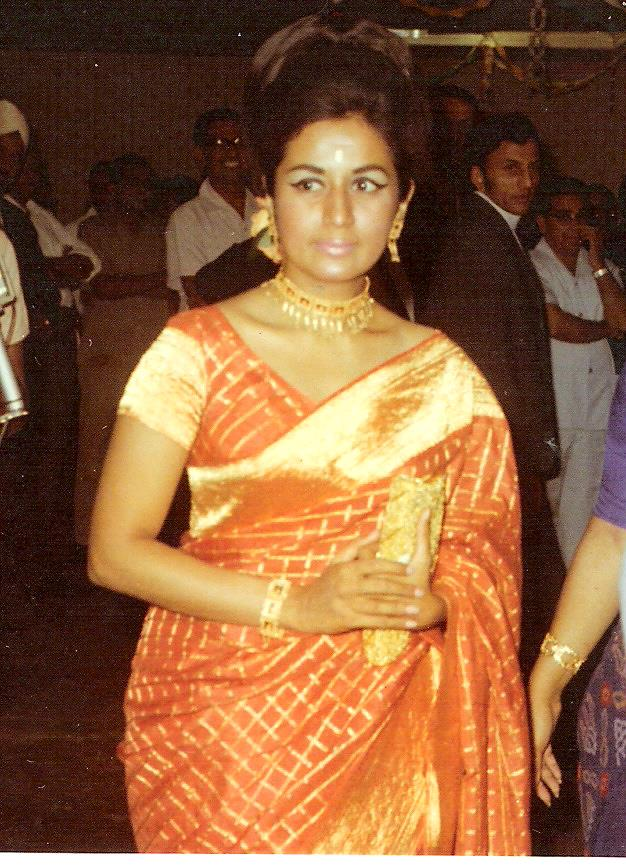
Nanda

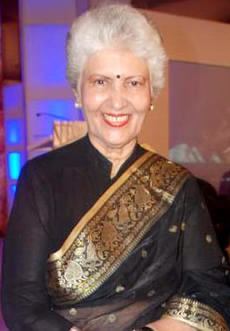
Shashikala

Kamini Kadam

Year	Name	Debut film	Other notable films
1950	Shashikala	Patthe Bapurao	
1951	Sandhya Shantaram	Amar Bhoopali	Pinjara (1972)
1952	Rekha	Lakhachi Gosht	
1952	Chitra Nawathe	Lakhachi Gosht	
1953	Medha Gupte	Devbappa	
1955	Nanda Karnataki	Kuldaivat	Shevagyachya Shenga (1955), Devghar (1956), Zalegele Visrun Jaa (1957)
1955	Kamini Kadam	Yere Maazya Magalya	Dhakti Jaoo (1957), Don Ghadicha Daav (1957)
1959	Jayshree Gadkar	Sangtye Aika	Manini (1961), Sawal Maza Aika (1964), Sadhi Mansa (1965)
1959	Leela Gandhi	Saata Janmachi Sobti	Manaacha Mujra (1969), Sarvasakshi (1978), Manacha Kunku (1981).

== 1960s ==
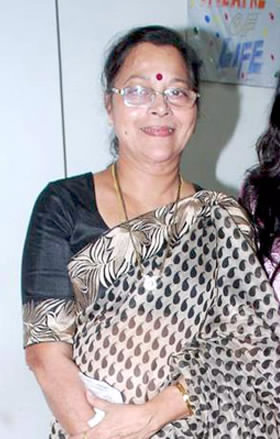
Seema Deo

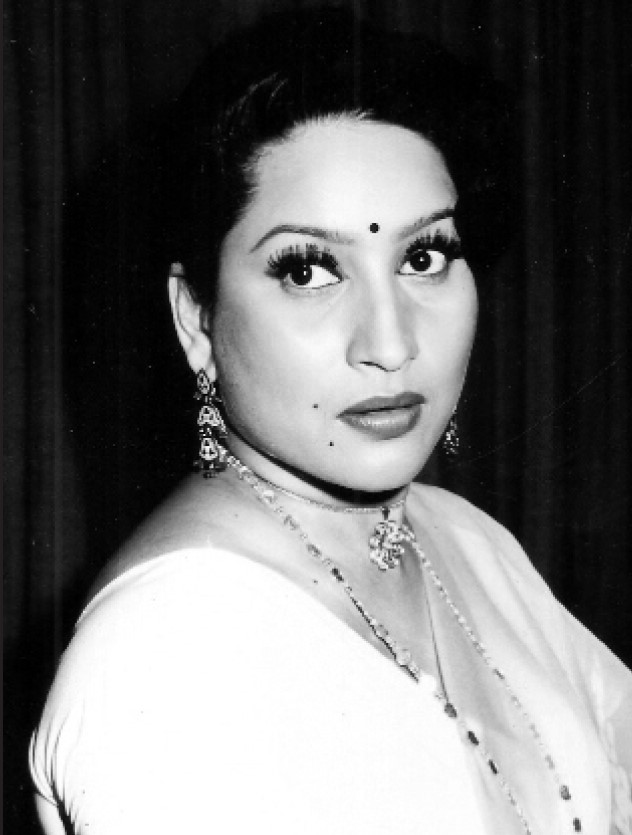
Padma Chavan

Leela Gandhi

Jeevankala

Year	Name	Debut film	Other notable films
1960	Padma Chavan	Avaghachi Sansar	Jyotibacha Navas (1975)
1960	Uma Bhende	Aakashganga	Madhuchandra (1967), Aamhi Jato Amchya Gava (1968), Angai (1968), Bhalu (1980)
1960	Seema Deo	Jagachya Pathivar	
1961	Asha Patil	Antaricha Diwa	Sadhi Mansa (1965), Samna (1974), Ram Ram Gangaram (1977)
1962	Shanta Tambe	Vithu Mazha Lekurwala	
1962	Asha Kale	Baikocha Bhau	Ha Khel Savlyancha (1976), Bala Gau Kashi Angai (1977), Sasurvashin (1978), Thorli Jaau (1983), Kulswamini Ambabai (1984)
1962	Jeevankala	Ha Maza Marg Ekala	
1963	Asha Nadkarni	Fakira	
1964	Reema Lagoo	Masterji	Sinhasan (1979), Resham Gaath (2002), Janma (2011), Anumati (2013)
1964	Maya Jadhav	Sawaal Majha Aika	
1964	Bhavana	Pathlaag	
1965	Mandakani Bhadbhade	Sudharlelya Baika	Zunj (1975)
1965	Asha Potdar	Vavtal	
1965	Ratna	Padchhaya	
1967	Shubha Khote	Chimukala Pahuna	
1967	Sushama Shiromanee	Kaka Mala Vachwa	Mosambi Narangi (1981), Gulchadi (1984)
1968	Jayshree T.	Dharmakanya	Chatak Chandni (1982)
1968	Anupama	Dharmakanya	
1968	Surekha	Ekti	
1968	Kanan Kaushal	Ekti	
1968	Bharati Malwankar	Yethe Shahane Rahtat	
1969	Sarala Yeolekar	Saticha Vaan	Pinjara (1972)

== 1970s ==
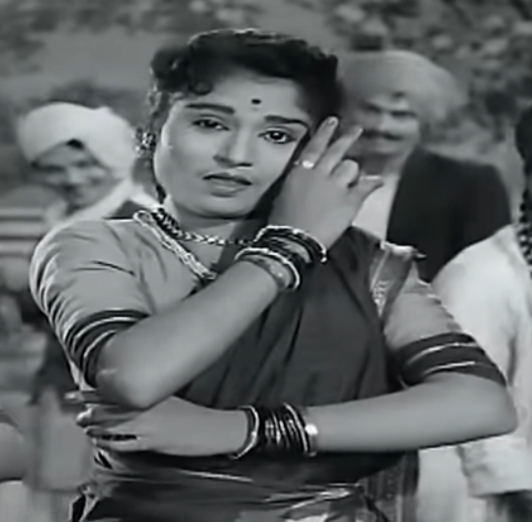
Usha Chavan

Asha Kale

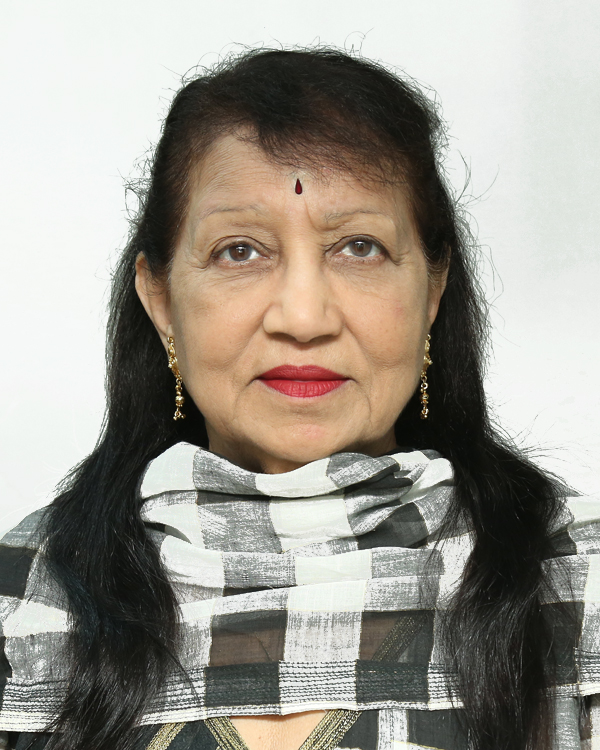
Sushama Shiromanee

Usha Naik

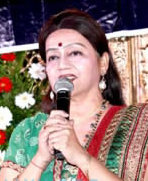
Jayshree T.

Kanan Kaushal

Year	Name	Debut film	Other notable films
1970	Usha Chavan	Songadya	Ekta Jeev Sadashiv (1972), Pandu Hawaldar (1975), Nav Motha Lakshan Khota (1977), Ranpakhre (1980)
1971	Sulabha Deshpande	Shantata! Court Chalu Aahe	Jait Re Jait (1977), Chaukat Raja (1991)
1971	Nargis Banu	Lakhat Ashi Dekhani	
1972	Usha Naik	Pinjara	Karava Tasa Bharava (1975), Kalavantin (1978), Haldikunku (1979), Ek Hazarachi Note (2014)
1973	Aruna Irani	Andhala Marto Dola	Bhingri (1977), Ek Gadi Baki Anadi (1988), Changu Mangu (1990)
1973	Roohi	Jawai Vikat Ghene Aahe	Aaram Haram Aahe (1976)
1974	Smita Patil	Raja Shiv Chhatrapati	Samna (1975), Jait Re Jait (1977), Umbartha (1982)
1974	Laxmi Chhaya	Tevdha Sodun Bola	
1974	Lata Arun	Yashoda	Zunj (1975), Pandu Hawaldar (1975), Dhamaal Jodi (1995)
1975	Lalan Sarang	Samna	Ha Khel Savlyancha (1976)
1975	Ranjana Deshmukh	Chandanachi Choli Ang Aang Jali	Are Sansar Sansar (1980), Ek Daav Bhutacha (1982), Gondhalat Gondhal (1982), Gupchup Gupchup (1983), Bin Kamacha Navra (1984)
1975	Radha Bartake	Preet Tuzi Mazi	
1975	Kamini Bhatia	Zunj	Choricha Mamla (1976), Deed Shahane (1979), Mardani (1983)
1976	Pallavi Joshi	Badla	Rita (2009), Prem Mhanje Prem Mhanje Prem Asta (2013)
1977	Shama Deshpande	Asla Navra Nakoga Bai	Madhuchandrachi Raatra (1989)
1977	Nutan	Paradh	
1978	Anjali Paigankar	Sarvasakshi	
1979	Usha Nadkarni	Sinhasan	Maherchi Saadi (1991), Pak Pak Pakaak (2005) Agadbam (2010), Ventilator (2016)
1979	Nayana Apte	Janki	
1979	Vandana Pandit	Ashtavinayak	
1979	Sushma Tendulkar	Chimanrao Gundyabhau	

== 1980s ==
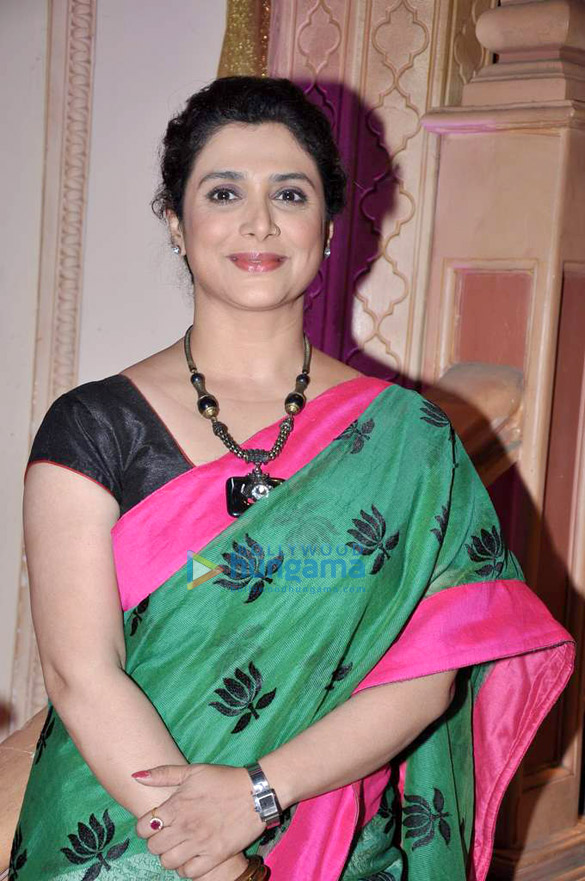
Supriya

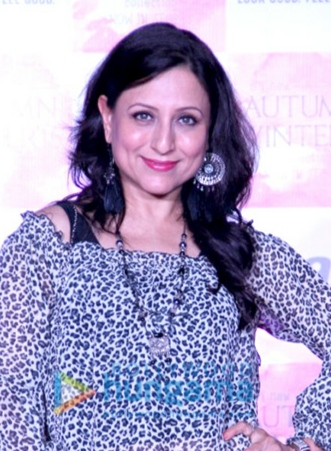
Kishori Shahane

Savita Prabhune

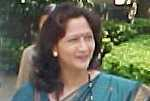
Alka Kubal

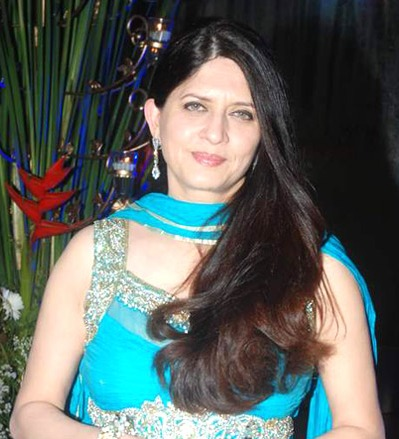
Archana Joglekar

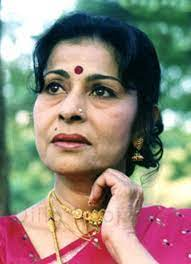
Madhu Kambikar

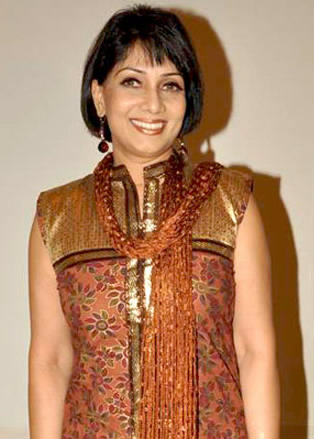
Asawari Joshi

Priya Tendulkar

Year	Name	Debut film	Other notable films
1980	Tanuja	Zaakol	Pitruroon (2013)
1980	Urmila Matondkar	Zaakol	Ajoba (2014)
1981	Priya Tendulkar	Gondhalat Gondhal	Mumbaicha Faujdar (1984)
1981	Suhasini Deshpande	Manacha Kunku	Laxmichi Paule (1982)
1981	Alka Kubal	Sobati	Lek Chalali Sasarla (1984), Madhu Chandrachi Ratra (1989), Balache Baap Brahmachari (1989), Maherchi Sadi (1991), Devki (2001)
1981	Shalaka Sabnis	Ghar Jawai	
1981	Chitra Palekar	Akriet	
1982	Ashalata Wabgaonkar	Umbartha	Navri Mile Navryala (1984), Pudhcha Paool (1986)
1982	Kalpana Iyer	Mai Baap	
1983	Shubhangi Rawate	Gupchup Gupchup	
1984	Kajal Kiran	Savvasher	
1984	Savita Prabhune	Lek Chalali Sasarla	Gadbad Ghotala (1986), Khara Varasdar (1986), Mamla Porincha (1988), Kalat Nakalat (1989), Tuzhi Mazhi Jamli Jodi (1990)
1984	Nivedita Joshi	Navri Mile Navryala	Dhoom Dhadaka (1985), De Danadan (1987), Ashi Hi Banwa Banwi (1988), Thartharat (1989), Majha Chakula (1994)
1984	Supriya Pilgaonkar	Navri Mile Navryala	Ashi Hi Banwa Banwi (1988), Maza Pati Karodpati (1988), Navra Maza Navsacha (2004), Amhi Satpute (2008)
1985	Bharati Achrekar	Ardhangi	Tighee (2026)
1985	Archana Joglekar	Khichdi	Nivdung (1989), Eka Peksha Ek (1990)
1985	Prema Kiran	Dhoom Dhadaka	Gadbad Ghotala (1986), Khatyal Sasu Nataal Navra (1987)
1986	Ashwini Bhave	Shabas Sunbai	Ashi Hi Banwa Banwi (1988), Kalat Nakalat (1989), Dhadakebaaz (1990), Dhyanimani (2017)
1986	Smita Talwalkar	Dhakti Sun	Chaukat Raja (1991), Ram Rahim (1993)
1986	Archana Patkar	Pudhcha Paool	
1986	Mugdha Chitnis	Mazha Ghar Mazha Sansar	
1986	Asawari Joshi	Mazhe Ghar Mazha Sansar	Ek Ratra Manterleli (1989), Godi Gulabi (1991)
1986	Tejashri	Aamhi Dogha Raja Rani	
1987	Varsha Usgaonkar	Gammat Jammat	Saglikade Bombabomb (1988), Hamal De Dhamal (1989), Ek Hota Vidushak (1992), Savat Mazi Ladki (1993), Lapandav (1993)
1987	Sukanya Kulkarni	Premasathi Vattel Te	Varsa Laxmicha (1994), Putravati (1996) Sarkarnama (1998), Saade Maade Teen (2007)
1987	Kishori Shahane	Prem Karuya Khullam Khulla	Balache Baap Brahmachari (1989), Maherchi Sadi (1991), Mohatyachi Renuka (2006)
1987	Pooja Pawar	Sarja	Zapatlela (1993), Majha Chakula (1994)
1987	Kanchan Adhikari	Premasathi Vattel Te	Balache Baap Brahmachari (1989)
1988	Priya Berde	Ashi Hi Banwa Banwi	Thartharat (1989), Yeda Ki Khula (1991)
1988	Shobha Shiralkar	Chal Re Laxya Mumbaila	
1989	Vandana Gupte	Pasant Aahe Mulgi	Lapandav (1993), Pachhadlela (2004), Matichya Chuli (2006), Family Katta (2016), Baipan Bhaari Deva (2023)
1989	Rekha Rao	Dharla Tar Chavtay	Aamchyasarkhe Aamhich (1990)
1989	Neelkanti Patekar	Atmavishwas	

== 1990s ==
Ashwini Bhave

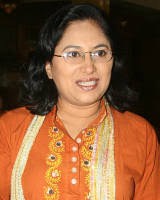
Sukanya Kulkarni

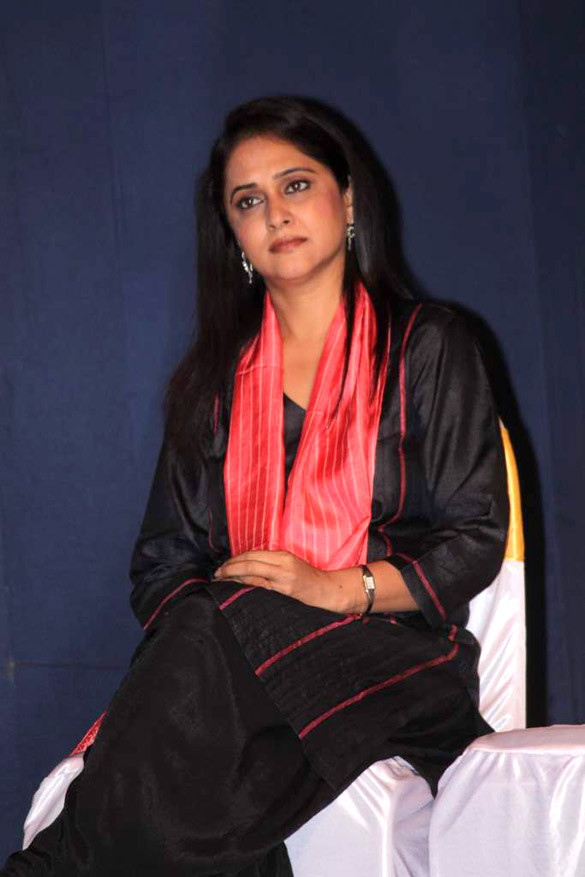
Mrinal Kulkarni

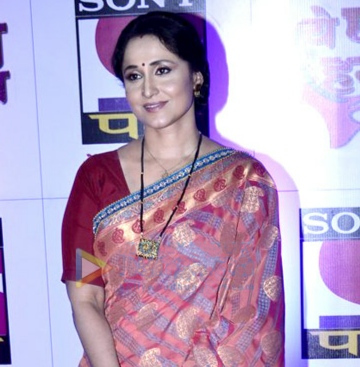
Nishigandha Wad

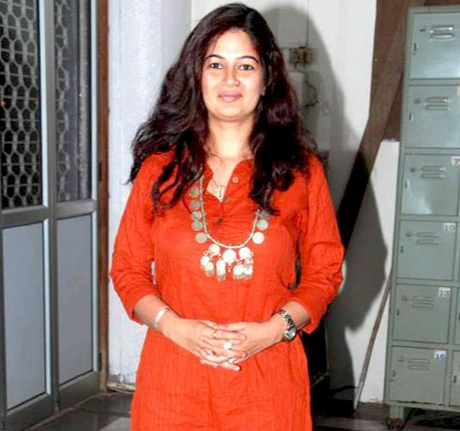
Resham Tipnis

Prateeksha Lonkar

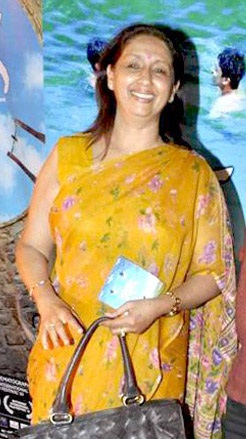
Neena Kulkarni

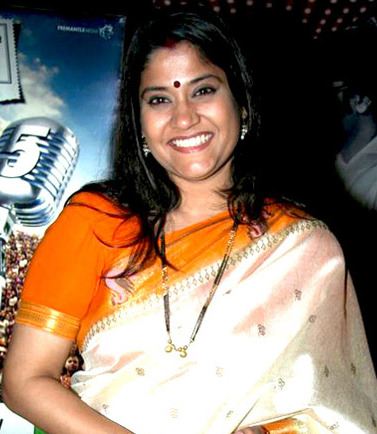
Renuka Shahane

Year	Name	Debut films	Other notable films
1990	Nishigandha Wad	Shejari Shejari	Eka Peksha Ek (1990), Bandhan (1991), Vaat Pahate Punvechi (1992)
1991	Prateeksha Lonkar	Ek Full Chaar Half	Jamla Ho Jamla (1995), Bhet (2002), Aevdhe Se Aabhaal (2007)
1991	Rajeshwari Sachdev	Aayatya Gharat Gharoba	Welcome Zindagi (2015), Samhita (2013), Firebrand (2019)
1991	Nirmiti Sawant	Chaukat Raja	Khabardaar (2005), Sasu Numbari Jawai Dus Numbari (2008), Kumari Gangubai Non Matric (2013), Jhimma (2021)
1992	Suhas Joshi	Nishpaap	Tu Tithe Mee (1998), Saatchya Aat Gharat (2004), Jhimma (2021), Ekda Kaay Zala (2022)
1992	Neena Kulkarni	Hach Sunbaicha Bhau	Savat Mazi Ladki (1993), Aai (1995), Uttarayan (2005), Shevri (2006), Bioscope (2015), Photo Prem (2021)
1992	Renuka Shahane	Hach Sunbaicha Bhau	Aboli (1995), Uttar (2025)
1992	Kishori Ambiye	Khulyancha Bazaar	Zapatlela (1993)
1992	Resham Tipnis	Jiwalagaa	Aapan Yana Pahilat Ka (1992), Satvapariksha (1998)
1993	Kavita Lad	Ghayaal	Tu Tithe Mee (1998), Doctor Rakhmabai (2016)
1993	Chinmayi Sumeet	Bharla Ha Malavat Raktan	Muramba (2017), Faster Fene (2017)
1994	Sonali Kulkarni	Mukta	Doghi (1995), Gharabaher (2001), Devrai (2004), Dr. Prakash Baba Amte - The Real Hero (2014), Kachcha Limboo (2017), Pension (2021)
1994	Mrinal Kulkarni	Maza Saubhagya	Lekroo (2000), Jodidar (2000), Prem Mhanje Prem Mhanje Prem Asta (2013), Rama Madhav (2014), Pawankhind (2022)
1994	Sulabha Arya	Maza Saubhagya	A Rainy Day (2014), Ventilator (2016)
1995	Bhavana Balsavar	Sukhi Sansarachi 12 Sutre	
1995	Sulekha Talwalkar	Aai	Sanshay Kallol (2013), Family Katta (2016)
1995	Medha Manjrekar	Aai	De Dhakka (2008), Kaksparsh (2012), Natsamrat (2016)
1997	Surekha Kudachi	Saasuchi Maaya	Mee Tulas Tujhya Angani (2005), Bharat Aala Parat (2007), Foreign Chi Patlin (2008)
1998	Sharvani Pillai	Tu Tithe Mee	Jogwa (2009)
1998	Smita Jaykar	Satvapariksha	Astitva (2001), Devki (2001)
1999	Deepa Parab	Bindhaast	Chakwa (2004), Mulga (2010), Baipan Bhaari Deva (2023)
1999	Seema Biswas	Bindhaast	Dhyaas Parva (2001), Lalbaug Parel (2010)
1999	Sharvari Jamenis	Bindhaast	
1999	Shilpa Navalkar	Kairee	Baipan Bhaari Deva (2023)
1999	Leena Bhagwat	Kairee	
1999	Aishwarya Narkar	Ghe Barari	Mala Jagaychay (2003), Zuluk (2005), Mee Tulas Tujhya Angani (2005), Tighi (2005)

== 2000s ==
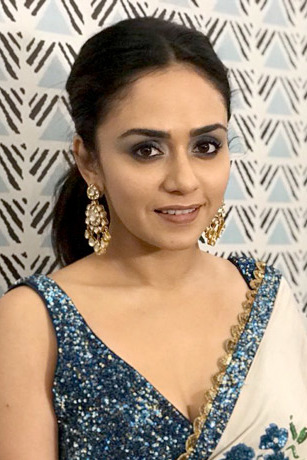
Amruta Khanvilkar

Madhura Velankar

Urmilla Kanetkar

Kranti Redkar

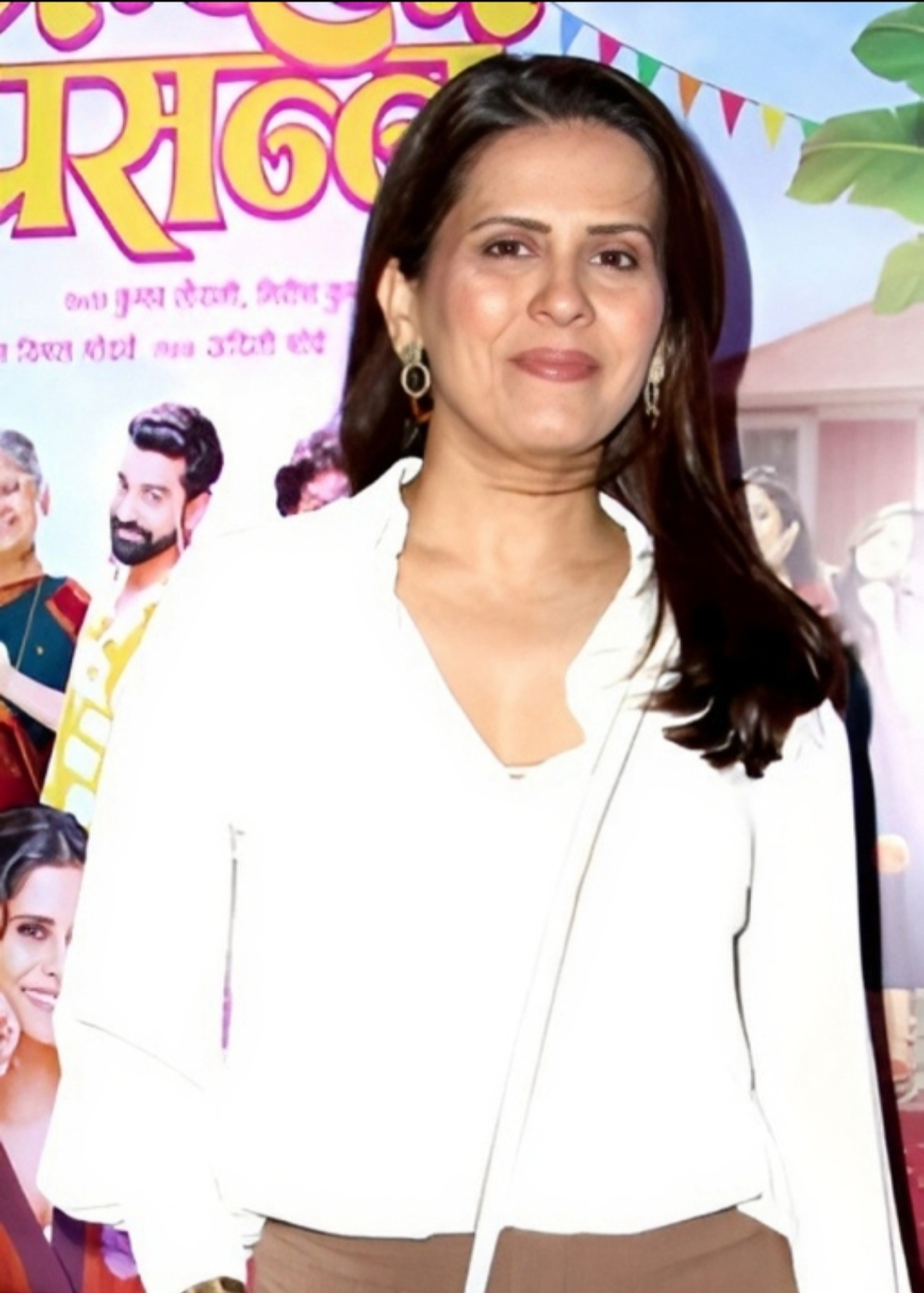
Sonali Khare

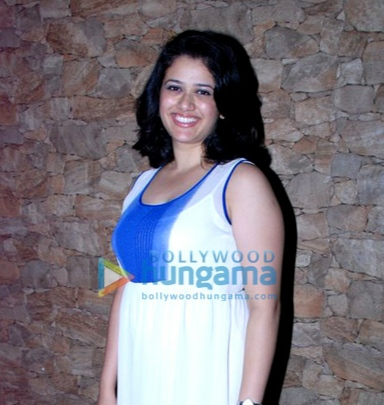
Girija Oak

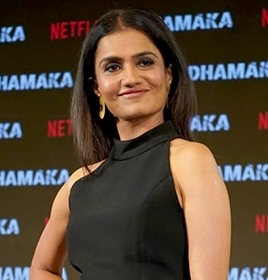
Amruta Subhash

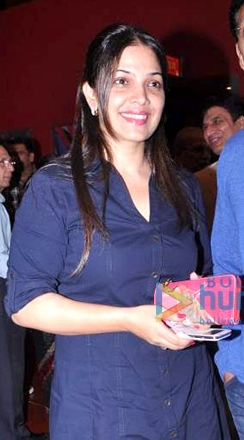
Shilpa Tulaskar

Year	Name	Debut film	Other notable films
2000	Padmini Kolhapure	Chimani Pakhar	Manthan: Ek Amrut Pyala (2005), Prawaas (2020)
2000	Tabu	Astitva	
2000	Kranti Redkar	Soon Asavi Ashi	Jatra: Hyalagaad Re Tyalagaad (2006), Shikshanachya Aaicha Gho (2010), Kiran Kulkarni vs Kiran Kulkarni (2016), Karaar (2017)
2000	Madhurani Gokhale	Lekroo	
2000	Trupti Bhoir	Bagh Haat Dakhvun	Agadbam (2010)
2000	Seema Shinde	Kulswami Tulja Bhawani	
2001	Shilpa Tulaskar	Devki	Dombivli Fast (2005), Anandache Zhaad (2006), Sugar Salt Ani Prem (2015)
2002	Jyoti Subhash	Dahavi Fa	Valu (2008)
2002	Priya Bapat	Bhet	Kaksparsh (2013), Happy Journey (2014), Vazandar (2016), Aamhi Doghi (2018)
2003	Sonali Khare	Resham Gaath	Savarkhed Ek Gaon (2004), Checkmate (2008), 7, Roshan Villa (2016), MyLek (2024)
2003	Pallavi Subhash	Polisachi Bayko	
2003	Madhura Velankar	Not Only Mrs. Raut	Sarivar Sari (2005), Matichya Chuli (2006), Butterfly (2023)
2003	Aditi Deshpande	Not Only Mrs. Raut	
2003	Sonali Bendre	Anahat	
2004	Atisha Naik	Wrong Mauritius	Deool (2011)
2004	Spruha Joshi	May Baap	A Paying Ghost (2015), Lost and Found (2016)
2004	Megha Dhade	Sakshatkar	Bokad (2012)
2004	Amruta Subhash	Shwaas	Gandha (2009), Astu (2013), Killa (2014), Ti Ani Itar (2017), Jarann (2025)
2004	Vibhavari Deshpande	Shwaas	Saatchya Aat Gharat (2004), Harishchandrachi Factory (2009), Balgandharva (2011)
2004	Mukta Barve	Chakwa	Jogwa (2009), Mumbai-Pune-Mumbai (2010), Double Seat (2015), Aamhi Doghi (2018), Smile Please (2019)
2004	Rasika Joshi	Aga Bai Arrecha!	
2004	Tejaswini Pandit	Aga Bai Arrecha!	Gaiir (2009), Mee Sindhutai Sapkal (2010), Ye Re Ye Re Paisa (2018)
2004	Girija Oak	Manini	Chingi (2009), Huppa Huiyya (2010), Goshta Eka Paithanichi (2022)
2004	Aditi Sarangdhar	Akalpit	Divasen Divas (2006), Uladhaal (2008), Mohar (2013)
2004	Supriya Pathare	He Aapla Asach Chalaycha	Dili Supari Baikochi (2008)
2005	Shweta Shinde	Aabhas	Mohini (2008)
2005	Kshitee Jog	Saha September	Jhimma (2021), Pawankhind (2022)
2005	Harshada Khanvilkar	Dombivli Fast	
2005	Tejaswini Lonari	No Problem	Madhu Ithe Ani Chaughe Tithe (2008), Guldasta (2011), Chinu (2012)
2005	Manasi Salvi	Sarivar Sari	Aai Shappath..! (2006)
2005	Narayani Shastri	Pak Pak Pakaak	
2005	Kishori Godbole	Khabardar	Full 3 Dhamaal (2008)
2006	Amruta Khanvilkar	Golmaal	Saade Maade Teen (2007), Zhakaas (2011), Katyar Kaljat Ghusali (2015), Chandramukhi (2022)
2006	Smita Shewale	Yanda Kartavya Aahe	Ladi Godi (2010), Subhedar (2023)
2006	Smita Tambe	Naati Goti	Tukaram (2012), 72 Miles - Ek Pravas (2013)
2006	Kadambari Kadam	Hi Porgi Kunachi	Tula Shikvin Changlach Dhada (2007), Aaghaat (2010), Kshanbhar Vishranti (2010), Krantijyoti Vidyalay Marathi Madhyam (2026)
2006	Sonalee Kulkarni	Gauri	Bakula Namdeo Ghotale (2007), Natarang (2010), Classmates (2015), Hirkani (2019), Tighee (2026)
2006	Sarika Nilatkar	Pehli Sher Doosari Savaasher Navara Paavsher	Ek Daav Sansaracha (2007)
2006	Rohini Hattangadi	Devashappath Khote Sangen	Premachi Goshta (2013), Baipan Bhaari Deva (2023), Aata Vel Zaali (2024)
2007	Bhagyashree Patwardhan	Mumbai Aamchich	Zhak Marli Bayko Keli (2009)
2007	Vishakha Subhedar	Premat Sarech Kahi Maaf	Mast Challay Amcha (2011), Yedyanchi Jatra (2012), Ye Re Ye Re Paisa (2018)
2007	Rujuta Deshmukh	Tula Shikwin Changlach Dhada	
2007	Manasi Naik	Zabardast	Cappuccino (2014), Murder Mestri (2015), Sakaal Tar Hou Dya (2025)
2007	Nagma	Thamb Lakshmi Thamb	
2007	Urmilla Kothare	Shubha Mangal Saavadhan	Mala Aai Vhhaychy! (2011), Duniyadari (2013), Ekda Kaay Zala (2022)
2007	Smita Gondkar	Mumbaicha Dabewala	Baloch (2023)
2008	Sai Tamhankar	Sanai Choughade	No Entry Pudhe Dhoka Aahey (2012), Duniyadari (2013), Classmates (2015), Pondicherry (2022)
2008	Shruti Marathe	Sanai Choughade	Dharmaveer (2022), Sarsenapati Hambirrao (2022)
2008	Anita Date Kelkar	Sanai Choughade	A Paying Ghost (2015), Me Vasantrao (2022), Vaalvi (2023), Jarann (2025)
2008	Aditi Bhagwat	Chalu Navra Bholi Baiko	Sumbaran (2009)
2008	Prajakta Mali	Taandala - Ek Mukhavta	Pandu (2021), Luckdown Be Positive (2022), Y (2022)
2008	Suchitra Bandekar	Full 3 Dhamaal	Me Shivaji Raje Bhosale Boltoy (2009), Jhimma (2021), Baipan Bhaari Deva (2023)
2009	Neha Joshi	Zenda	
2009	Tejashri Pradhan	Zenda	Dr. Prakash Baba Amte - The Real Hero (2014), Ti Saddhya Kay Karte (2017)
2009	Mrunmayee Deshpande	Ek Cup Chya	Katyar Kaljat Ghusali (2015), Natsamrat (2016), Dhyanimani (2017), 15 August (2019), Chandramukhi (2022)
2009	Radhika Apte	Samaantar	Tukaram (2012), Lai Bhaari (2014)
2009	Neha Pendse	Agnidivya	A Rainy Day (2014), Natsamrat (2016), June (2020), Tighee (2026)
2009	Ashwini Kalsekar	Sumbaran	
2009	Shweta Mehendale	Javai Bapu Zindabad	Sagla Karun Bhagle (2011)
2009	Parna Pethe	Vihir	Rama Madhav (2014), Medium Spicy (2022)
2009	Suzanne Bernert	Gallit Gondhal, Dillit Mujra	

== 2010s ==
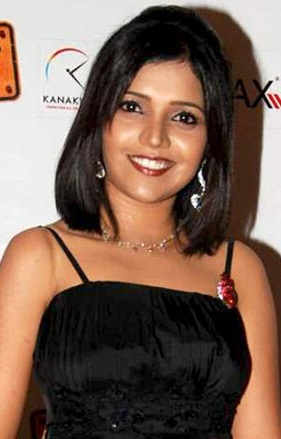
Mukta Barve

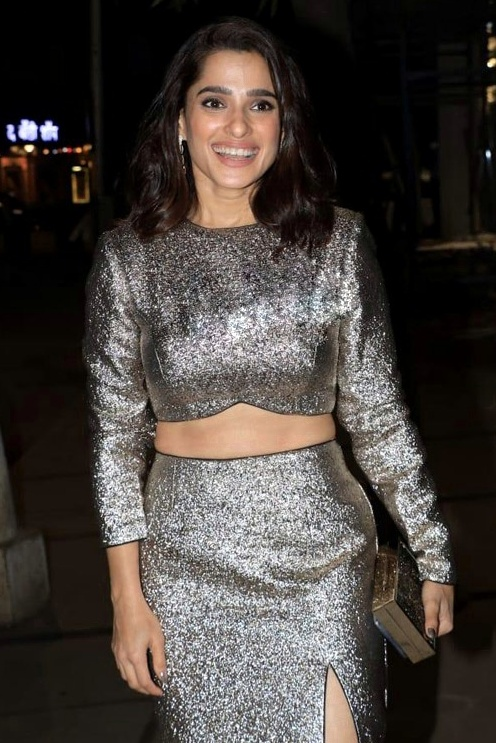
Priya Bapat

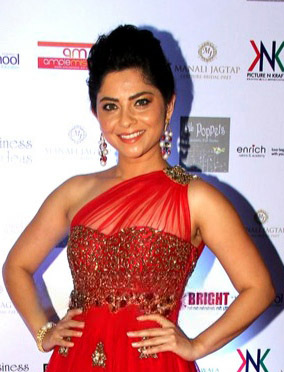
Sonalee Kulkarni

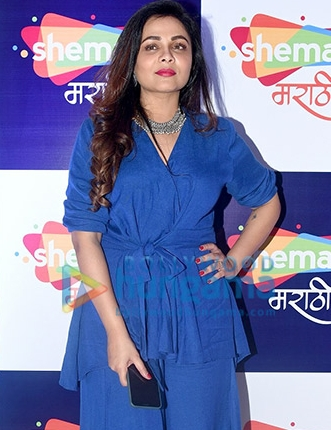
Prarthana Behere

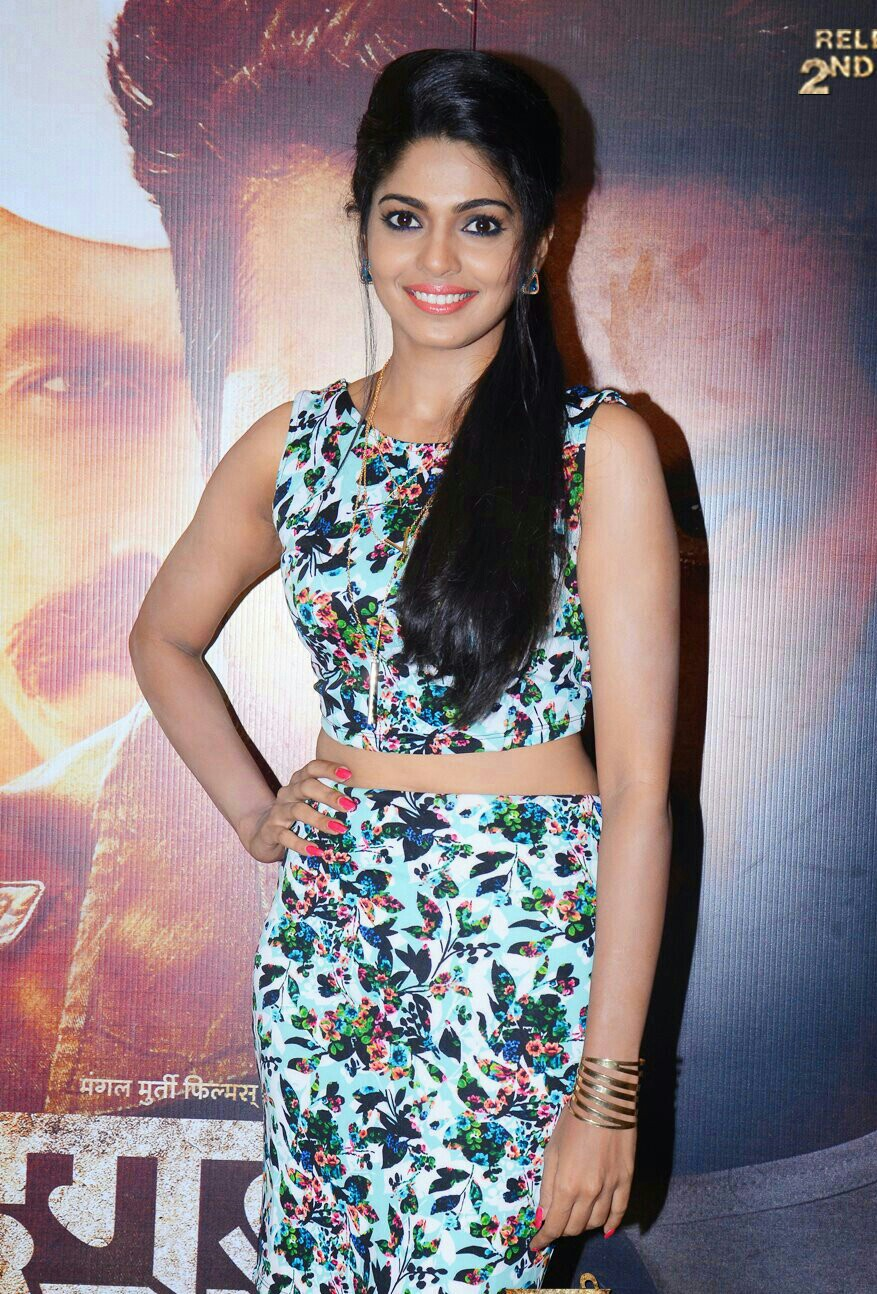
Pooja Sawant

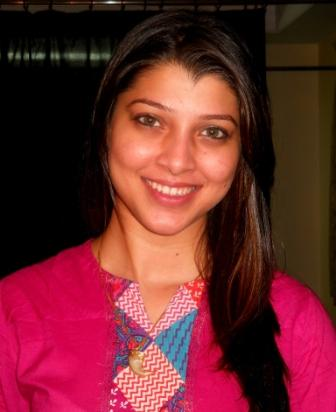
Tejaswini Pandit

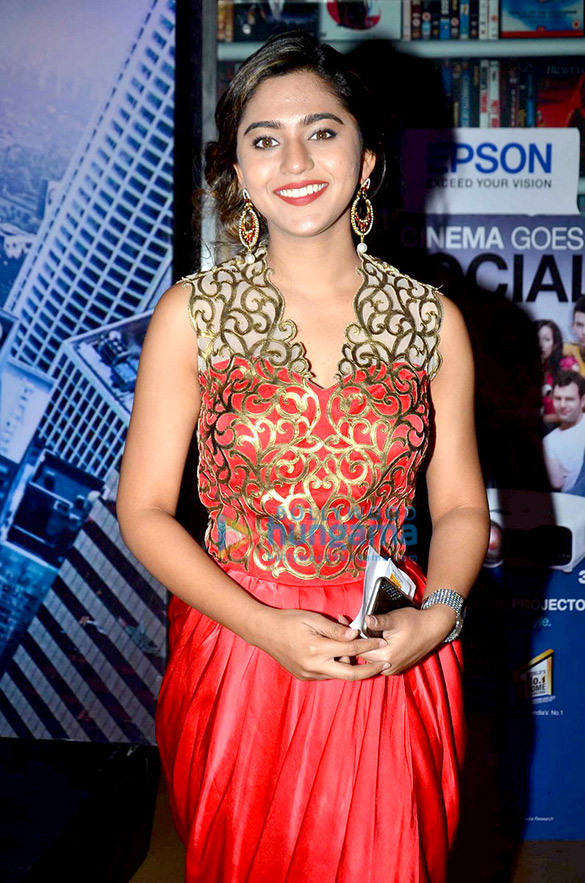
Mrunmayee Deshpande

Mrinmayee Godbole

Year	Name	Debut film	Other notable films
2010	Manava Naik	Kshanbhar Vishranti	No Entry Pudhe Dhoka Aahey (2012)
2010	Pooja Sawant	Kshanbhar Vishranti	Nilkanth Master (2015), Dagadi Chawl (2015), Lapachhapi (2017), Bali (2021)
2010	Samidha Guru	Kaydyaach Bola	Dhating Dhingana (2014), Kapus Kondyachi Gosht (2014)
2010	Bhargavi Chirmule	Ideachi Kalpana	One Room Kitchen (2011), Sandook (2015)
2010	Hrishitaa Bhatt	Mani Mangalsutra	Dhol Taashe (2015)
2010	Vaidehi Parshurami	Ved Lavi Jeeva	Ani... Dr. Kashinath Ghanekar (2018), Zombivli (2022), Jaggu Ani Juliet (2023)
2010	Anusha Dandekar	Lalbaug Parel	Baap Manus (2023), Juna Furniture (2024)
2010	Kashmera Shah	Lalbaug Parel	Nay Varanbhat Loncha Kon Nay Koncha (2022)
2011	Mrinmayee Godbole	Teecha Baap Tyacha Baap	Chi Va Chi Sau Ka (2017), Ye Re Ye Re Paisa 2 (2019)
2011	Ketaki Mategaonkar	Shala	Kaksparsh (2012), Timepass (2014)
2011	Snehal Tarde	Shala	Dharmaveer (2022), Phullwanti (2024), Deool Band 2 (2026)
2011	Neha Shitole	Deool	
2011	Tanvi Kishore	Raada Rox	
2012	Ritika Shrotri	Prem Mhanje Prem Mhanje Prem Asta	Boyz (2017), Darling (2021)
2012	Neha Gadre	Mokala Shwaas	
2012	Reena Madhukar	Ajintha	31 Divas (2018), Sur Lagu De (2024)
2012	Saiee Manjrekar	Kaksparsh	
2012	Usha Jadhav	Dhag	Firebrand (2018)
2013	Anuja Sathe	Asa Mee Ashi Tee	Ghantaa (2016)
2013	Prarthana Behere	Jai Maharashtra Dhaba Bhatinda	Mitwaa (2015), Coffee Ani Barach Kahi (2015), Aga Aga Sunbai! Kay Mhantay Sasubai? (2026)
2013	Sagarika Ghatge	Premachi Goshta	
2013	Sharmishtha Raut	Yoddha	
2013	Shriya Pilgaonkar	Ekulti Ek	
2013	Bhagyashree Milind	Balak Palak	Anandi Gopal (2019)
2013	Pritam Kagne	Navra Maza Bhavra	Halal (2015)
2014	Neha Mahajan	Ajoba	
2014	Monalisa Bagal	Sau Shashi Deodhar	Ravrambha (2023)
2014	Mayuri Deshmukh	Dr. Prakash Baba Amte – The Real Hero	31 Divas (2018)
2014	Aaditi Pohankar	Lai Bhaari	
2014	Girija Joshi	Govinda	Priyatama (2014)
2014	Tanvi Azmi	Lai Bhaari	
2014	Apurva Nemlekar	Bhakarkhadi 7 km	Ravrambha (2023)
2014	Rajeshwari Kharat	Fandry	
2014	Sanskruti Balgude	Makadacha Lagin	Sarva Line Vyasta Aahet (2019)
2014	Heena Panchal	Manus Ek Mati	
2014	Disha Pardeshi	Prem Pahil Vahil	
2015	Anjali Patil	The Silence	
2015	Tisca Chopra	Highway	
2015	Pallavi Patil	Classmates	
2015	Surabhi Hande	Aga Bai Arechyaa 2	
2015	Mitali Mayekar	Urfi	
2015	Manasi Moghe	Bugadi Maazi Sandli Ga	Autograph (2022)
2015	Vaibhavi Shandilya	Ekk Albela	
2015	Kashmira Kulkarni	Carry On Maratha	
2016	Rinku Rajguru	Sairat	Kaagar (2019), Asha (2025)
2016	Isha Keskar	CRD	Sarla Ek Koti (2023)
2016	Priyanka Bose	Half Ticket	
2016	Gauri Nalawade	Friends	Godavari (2021)
2016	Shivani Surve	Ghantaa	Triple Seat (2019), Vaalvi (2023)
2016	Anjana Sukhani	Laal Ishq	
2017	Aarya Ambekar	Ti Saddhya Kay Karte	
2017	Rasika Sunil	Baghtos Kay Mujra Kar	
2017	Neeta Shetty	Fugay	
2017	Mithila Palkar	Muramba	
2018	Madhuri Dixit	Bucket List	
2018	Trupti Toradmal	Savita Damodar Paranjpe	Shivrayancha Chhava (2024)
2019	Sayali Sanjeev	Aatpadi Nights	Basta (2021), Goshta Eka Paithanichi (2022), Ole Aale (2024)
2019	Amrita Rao	Thackeray	
2019	Hemal Ingle	Ashi Hi Aashiqui	Navra Maza Navsacha 2 (2024)

== 2020s ==
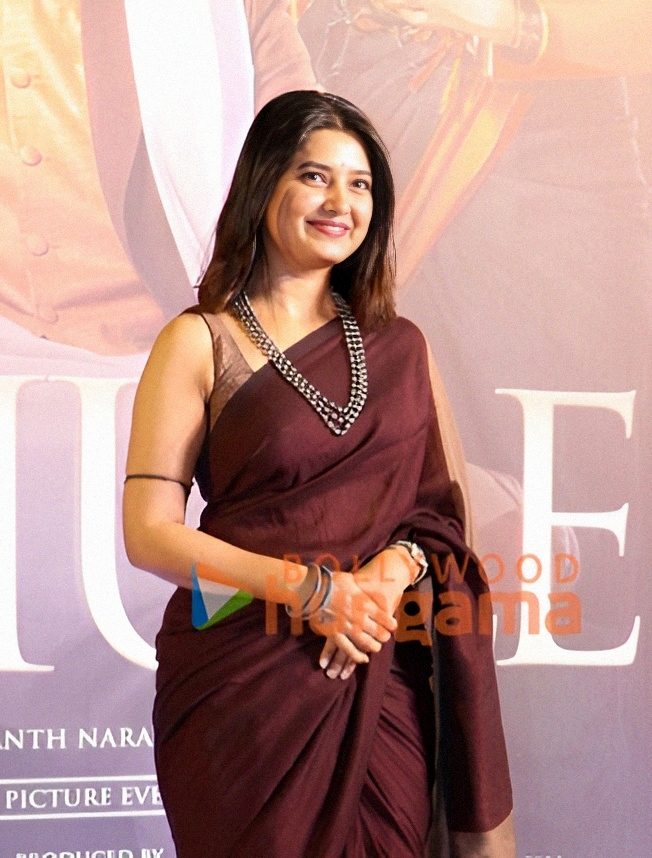
Prajakta Mali

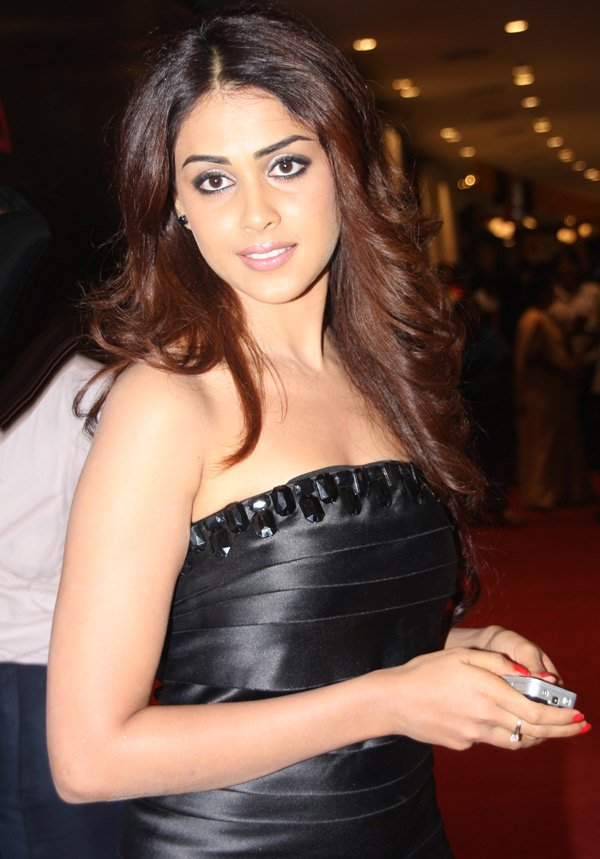
Genelia D'Souza

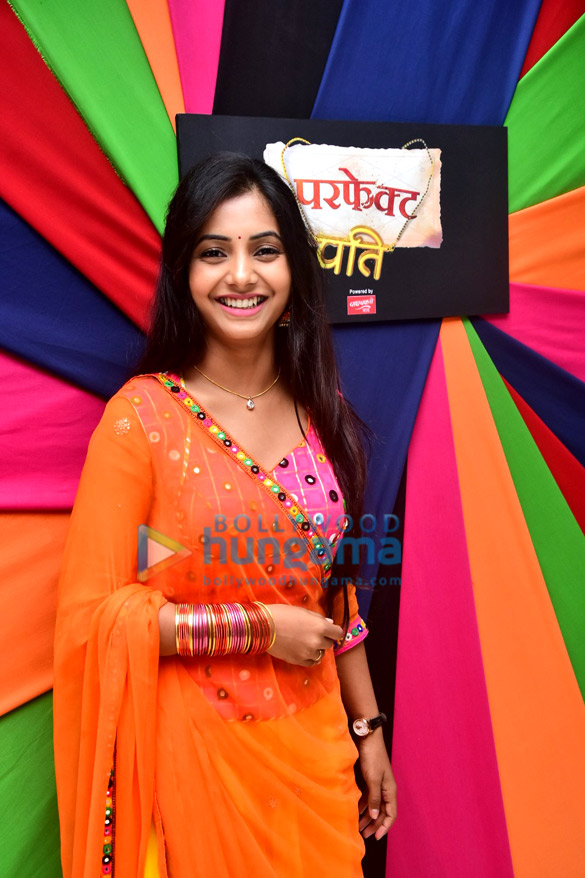
Sayali Sanjeev

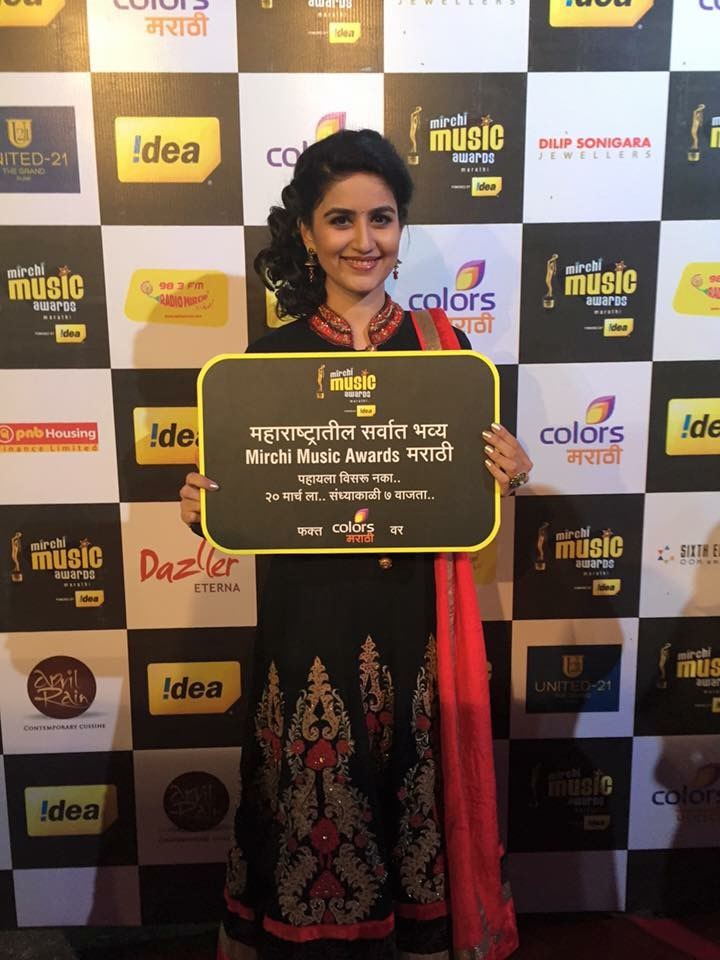
Vaidehi Parshurami

Prajakta Koli

Hemal Ingle

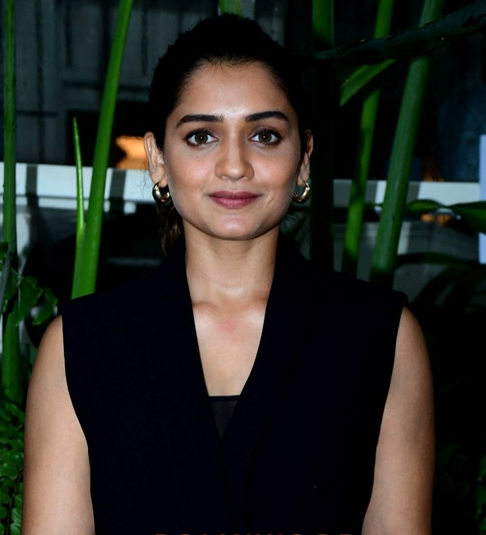
Hruta Durgule

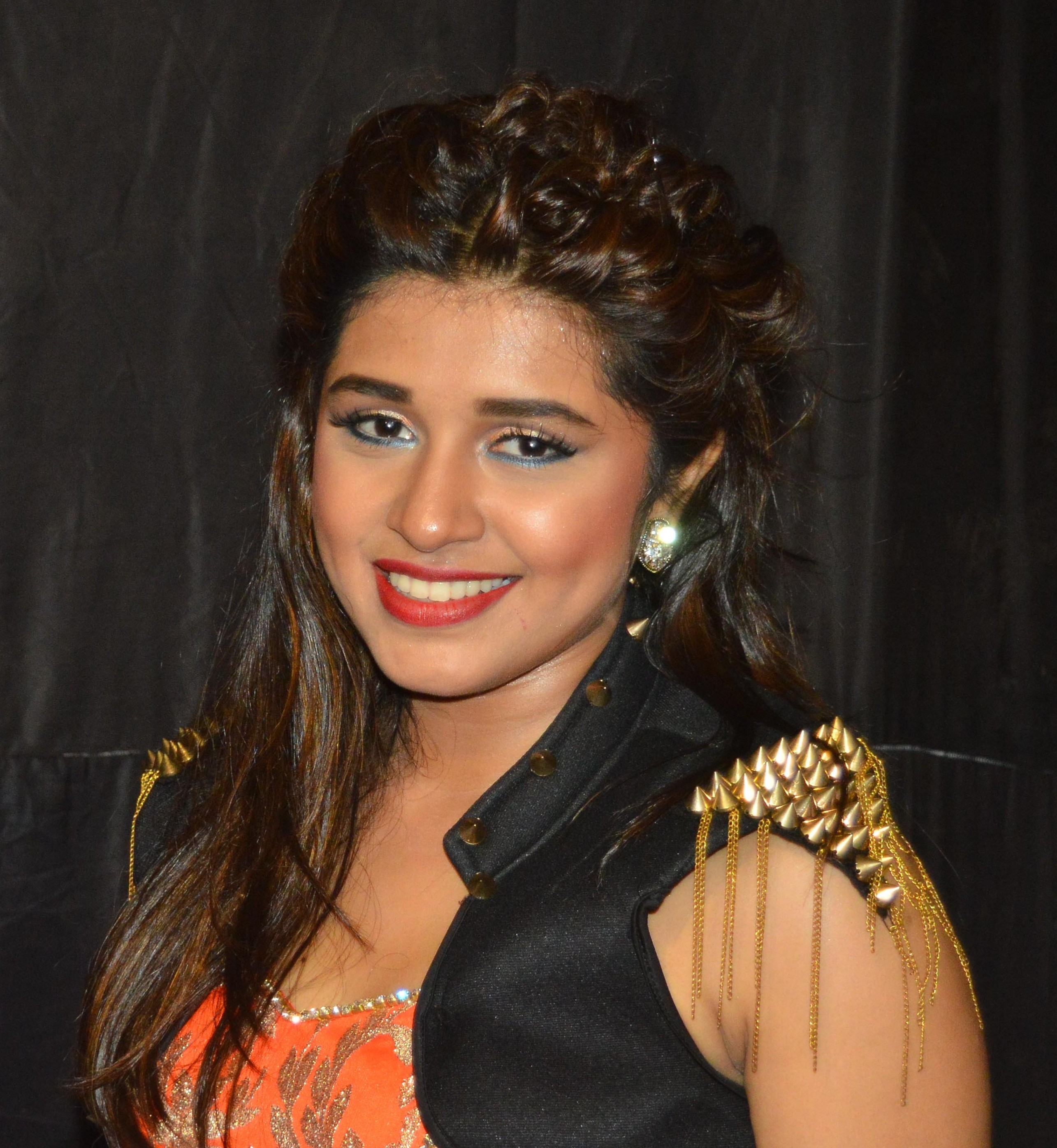
Sanskruti Balgude

Year	Name	Debut film	Other notable films
2020	Rutuja Bagwe	Respect	
2021	Resham Shrivardhankar	June	
2022	Shivali Parab	Prem Pratha Dhumshaan	Mangla (2025)
2022	Hruta Durgule	Ananya	Timepass 3 (2022), Aarpar (2025)
2022	Tejasswi Prakash	Mann Kasturi Re	
2022	Gauri Ingawale	Panghrun	De Dhakka 2 (2022), Hi Anokhi Gaath (2024)
2022	Ashwini Kesar	Ek Hota Malin	
2022	Genelia D'Souza	Ved	
2022	Jiya Shankar	Ved	
2023	Vaishnavi Kalyankar	Bamboo	
2023	Priyadarshini Indalkar	Phulrani	Navardev Bsc. Agri (2024), Dashavatar (2025)
2023	Sana Shinde	Maharashtra Shahir	
2023	Kalindi Nistane	TDM	
2023	Shweta Gulati	Aflatoon	
2023	Megha Shinde	Dhishkyaoon	Shri Ganesha (2024)
2024	Rajshri Deshpande	Satyashodhak	
2024	Pallavi Paranjape	Sridevi Prasanna	
2024	Smrity Sinha	Musafiraa	
2024	Vaishnavi Barde	Gaafil	
2024	Ankita Landepatil	Delivery Boy	
2024	Swanandi Berde	Man Yedyagat Zala	
2024	Niharica Raizada	Janma Runn	
2024	Sanayaah Anand	MyLek	
2024	Gargi Datar	Lek Asavi Tar Ashi	
2024	Jui Bhagwat	Like Aani Subscribe	Zapuk Zupuk (2025)
2024	Rajasi Bhave	Like Aani Subscribe	Gharat Ganpati (2024), Fussclass Dabhade (2025)
2024	Shanvi Srivastava	Raanti	
2025	Elli AvrRam	Ilu Ilu 1998	
2025	Richa Agnihotri	Sa La Te Sa La Na Te	
2025	Surbhi Bhosle	Ek Radha Ek Meera	
2025	Nandini Chikte	Sthal	
2025	Shraddha Khanolkar	Bhera	
2025	Sajiri Joshi	April May 99	
2025	Esha Dey	Gulkand	
2025	Sai Godbole	Tu, Me Ani Amaira	
2025	Ridhima Pandit	Premachi Goshta 2	
2026	Prajakta Koli	Krantijyoti Vidyalay Marathi Madhyam	
2026	Shital Patil	Rubaab	
2026	Anushka Sarkate	Jabraat	
2026	Megha Shetty	After Operation London Cafe	
2026	Gautami Patil	Ladki Bahin	

== See also ==
- List of Marathi film actors
