= Sushama Shiromanee =

Indian actress

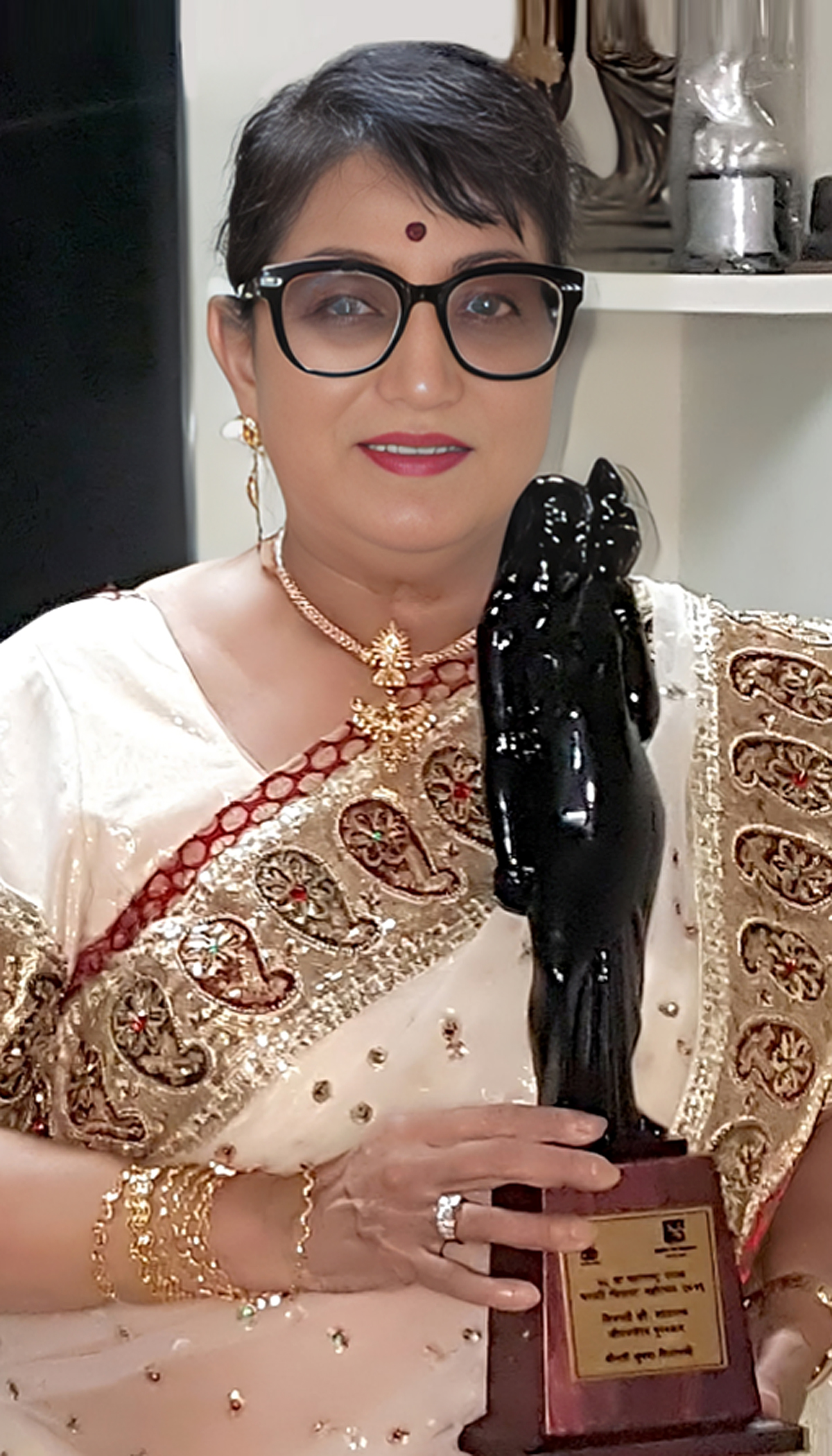
- Shiromanee with V. Shantaram Lifetime Achievement Award 2019
- Born: 9 November 1955 (age 70); Mumbai, Maharashtra, India
- Occupations: Actress, Producer
- Years active: 1958–present
- Awards: V. Shantaram Lifetime Achievement Award

Sushama Shiromanee (born 19 November 1955) is an actress, producer and a director who has worked across several regional film industries, including Hindi, Marathi and Gujarati. She served as the president of the Indian Motion Pictures Producers Association (IMPPA) from 2004 to 2005 and has held the position of senior vice-president since 2006.

She is known for directing films such as: Pyar Ka Karz(1990),Kanoon (1994 film) and Bijli and Marathi films like Bhingari, Fatakadi.

== Career ==
She started her career in 1958 as an actress.

== Awards ==
Chitrapati V. Shantaram Lifetime Achievement Award.Gov.of Maharashtra 2019/20 and jeevangaurav Award

== Filmography ==
=== Marathi films as a producer ===
- Bijli (1986)
- Gulchhadi (1984)
- Bhannat Bhanu (1982)
- Mosambi Narangi (1981)
- Fatakadi(1980)
- Bhingari(1976)
- Tevdha Shodhun Bola (1974)

=== Hindi films as a producer ===
- Prem Geet 3 (2022)
- Kanoon(1994)
- Pyar Ka Karz (1990)

=== Hindi and Marathi films as a director ===
- Kanoon (1994 film)
- Sonal Sundari (1985) Guajrati
- Gulchhadi (1984)
- Bhannat Bhanu (1982)

=== Hindi and Marathi films as an actress ===
- Chitamani Surdas (1988)
- Bijli (1986)
- Inteqam Ki Aag (1986)
- Sonal Sundari (1985)
- Gulchhadi(1984)
- Bhannat Bhanu (1982)
- Mosambi Narangi (1981)
- Fatakadi (1980)
- Maan Apmaan (1979)
- Kanchan ane Ganga (1978)
- Jai Ambe Maa (1977)
- Jai Randal Maa (1977)
- Bhingari (1977)
- Badla (1977)
- Hum Kisise Kum Naheen ( 1977)
- Bajrangbali (film) (1976)
- Daku Aur Bhagwan (1975)
- Chowkidar (1974)
- Tevdha Shodun Bola (1974)
- Haath Lavin Tithe Sona (1973)
- Kaadu Makrani (1973) Gujarati
- Mahashivratri (1972)
- Paathrakhin (1972)
- Narad Leela (1972)
- Mai Mauli (1971)
- Daam Kari Kaam (1971)
- Mai Mauli (197)
- Purani Pehchan (1971)
- Sampoorna Devi Drashan (1971)
- Maa Ka Aanchal (1970)
- Sampoorna Teerth Yatra (1970)
- Begunah (1970)
- Sawan Bhadon (1970)

=== As Child Artist ===
- Jyoti (1968)
- Satiche Van (1968)
- Sati Sulochana (1968)
- Talash (1969 film)
- Balram Shri Krishna(1968)
- Fareb (1968)
- Sati Arudhanti (1968)
- Yethe Shahane Rahtat (1968)
- Jung Aur Aman (1968)
- Chimukala Pahuna (1967)
- Kaka Mala Vachwa (1967)
- Thaamb Lakshmi Kanku Lavatey (1967)
- Gurukilli (1966)
- Kunwari (1966)
- Patlachi Soon (1966)
- Sheras Savva Sher (1966)
- Pavanakathcha Dhondi (1966)
- Nai Umar Ki Nai Fasal (1965)
- Sudharlelya Biaka (1965)
- Teen Devian (1965)
- Bheegi Raat (1965)
- Sehra (film) (1963)
- Talaaq (1958)
- Sone ki Chidiya (1958)
- Lajwanti (1958)

=== Hindi film as a distributor ===
- Khotey Sikkay
- Naag Panchami

== See also ==
- Marathi cinema
- Maharashtra State Film Awards
- List of Marathi film actresses
- Indian Motion Picture Producers Association
- List of people from Maharashtra
