= Aashirwad (film) =

- Directed by: Hrishikesh Mukherjee
- Written by: Story: Anil Ghosh; Dialogue: Gulzar
- Produced by: Hrishikesh Mukherjee; N. C. Sippy
- Starring: Ashok Kumar; Veena (actress); Sanjeev Kumar; Sumita Sanyal
- Cinematography: T.B. Seetaram
- Edited by: Hrishikesh Mukherjee
- Music by: Vasant Desai; Gulzar
- Release date: 1968
- Running time: 146 minutes
- Country: India
- Language: Hindi

Aashirwad (transl. Blessing) is a 1968 Bollywood film, directed by Hrishikesh Mukherjee. The film main stars Ashok Kumar, Veena (actress), Sumita Sanyal and Sanjeev Kumar. The film is notable for Ashok Kumar & Veena (actress) life time performances and its also inclusion of a rap-like song performed by Ashok Kumar, "Rail Gaadi" & "Nav Chali".

== Plot summary ==
The protagonist Jogi Thakur (Ashok Kumar) is a simple man of high principles. He is a Gharjamai with an autocratic landlady wife (Veena), and has been bequeathed property and estates by his father-in-law. He breaks his marriage when he finds out that on his wife's order, the chief accountant of the estate has cunningly obtained his signatures on an order that the houses of the poor be burnt. He leaves home, vowing never to return as long as he lives, leaving his daughter Neena behind. He moves to Mumbai where he makes a living by entertaining children in a park. He is specially fond of a girl whose name, incidentally, is Neena (played by baby Sarika), too. Unfortunately, the girl takes ill and dies.

Jogi then returns to his village, Chandanpur, where he finds that the daughter of one of his villager friends, Baiju, has been abducted. He rushes someplace where she is about to be raped by the estate's cunning chief accountant, and he kills him to protect the girl. The villagers make up a phony story to save him, but he opts to tell the truth in the court and is jailed. There, he starts tending to the garden and composes philosophical poems. The doctor at the jail, Dr. Biren (Sanjeev Kumar) takes a special liking to him. Coincidentally, Neena, Jogi Thakur's daughter is set to be married with the doctor. Jogi Thakur finds this out by chance as he is tending to the garden outside doctor's room and overhears their conversations. He also learns that his daughter hates criminals. And so he shields his face from her on the few occasions that they meet. Unfortunately, he takes ill just as he is granted pardon by the government for his good behaviour. The doctor, has come to think of him as a father figure. He tells Jogi Thakur that the day he will be out of jail will be the eve of his marriage. Jogi Thakur is taken by the desire to see his daughter being wedded, and hurries to see her. However, he does not want anyone to recognize him. Finally he joins the beggars who have gathered for a treat for the marriage, where his daughter and son-in-law are serving food. He manages to give his blessings to her and hurries out. However, as he collapses on the road, he is recognized and people gather around him. The news reaches his daughter who rushes to the spot to meet with her father at his last moment.

== Cast ==
- Ashok Kumar as Shivnath "Jogi Thakur" Choudhary
- Sanjeev Kumar as Doctor Biren
- Sumita Sanyal as Neena "Bittu" S. Choudhary
- Veena as Leela S. Choudhary, Rani maa
- Sajjan as Ramdas munimji
- Harindranath Chattopadhyay as Baiju "Dholakia"
- Padma Khanna as Rukmini
- Bipin Gupta
- S.N. Banerjee as Mohan/Mamaji
- Amar Kumar
- Brahm Bhardwaj advocate for Jogi Thakur
- Leela Gandhi as dancer in 'Saf Karo, insaf karo'
- Abhi Bhattacharya as Jailor
- Sarika as Munni/Neena
- Baby Deepali as young Neena/Bittu
- Dev Kishan as Mahadev street movie vendor
- Harbans Darshan M Arora as Munni's (Sarika) father
- Kedarnath Saigal as radio broadcaster (Ek tha bachpan)
- Amol Sen as guard of medical ward in jail.
- Ashim Kumar as bullock cart driver (Jeevan se lambe hai bandhu)

== Soundtrack ==
The music of the film was by Vasant Desai, with lyrics by Gulzar. Harindranath Chattopadhyay wrote the song "Rail Gaadi..."

- "Ik Tha Bachpan" - Lata Mangeshkar
- "Rail Gaadi Chhuk Chhuk Chhuk Chhuk" - Ashok Kumar
- "Jeevan Se Lambe Hain Bandhu Yeh Jeevan Ke Raste" - Manna Dey
- "Jhirjhir Barse" - Lata Mangeshkar
- "Saf Karo, insaf karo" - Asha Bhosle, Manna Dey, Ashok Kumar
- "Kanno ki ek nagri thi" - Ashok Kumar, Harindranath Chattopadhyay
- "Naav chali" - Ashok Kumar

The song "Ik Tha Bachpan" is set in raga Gurjari Todi.

== Awards ==
- 1969 Filmfare Best Actor Award for Ashok Kumar
- 1969 National Film Award for Best Actor for Ashok Kumar
- 1969 National Film Award for Best Feature Film in Hindi
