= Aai Thor Tujhe Upkar =

Aai Thor Tujhe Upkaar
- Theatrical release poster
- Directed by: Prakash Bhende
- Produced by: Uma Prakash Bhende
- Starring: Uma Bhende; Ashok Saraf; Laxmikant Berde; Sukanya Kulkarni; Mohan Joshi; Avinash Kharshikar
- Music by: Nandu Honap
- Production company: Shri Prasad Chitra
- Release date: November 1999
- Running time: 153 minutes
- Country: India
- Language: Marathi

Aai Thor Tujhe Upkaar is a 1999 Indian Marathi-language drama film directed by Prakash Bhende and produced by his wife Uma Bhende. The film stars Uma Bhende, Ashok Saraf, Laxmikant Berde, Sukanya Kulkarni and Mohan Joshi.

== Cast ==
- Prakash Bhende
- Ashok Saraf
- Laxmikant Berde
- Avinash Kharshikar
- Ravindra Berde
- Mohan Joshi
- Uma Bhende
- Surekha Kudachi
- Sukanya Kulkarni
- Kuldeep Pawar

== Soundtrack ==
The music is composed by Nandu Honap and the sung by Anupama Deshpande, Sudesh Bhosale and Uttara Kelkar.

=== Track listing ===
- "Priye Lajwanti"
- "Baicha Putla"
- "Vahinibai Vahinibai"
- "Aai Thor Tujhe Upkar" (Title track)
- "Man Aaj Pakhru Hoi"
- "Tu Wadapav Wala"
