= Sampoorna Teerth Yatra =

- Directed by: Dhirubhai Desai
- Produced by: Murarilal Gupta
- Starring: Sushama Shiromanee alias Jaymala and Jeevan
- Cinematography: Narottam Patni
- Music by: Shivram
- Release date: 20 March 1970
- Country: India
- Language: Hindi

Sampoorna Teerth Yatra is a 1970 Bollywood fantasy film directed by Dhirubhai Desai. The film stars Sushama Shiromanee alias Jaymala and Jeevan.

== Cast ==
- Sushama Shiromanee alias Jaymala ...Bimla, Debut
- Jeevan ... Bhagwan Naradmuni
- Mahipal ... Uttam
- Shahu Modak ...Vishnu

== Songs ==
1. "Daya Karo Hum Pe Bhole Shankar" - Mahendra Kapoor
2. "Ganga Maiya Aaj Humari Rakh Le Laaj" - Hemlata
3. "Hum Hai Bramha Vishnu Mahesh" - Shivram, Mahendra Kapoor
4. "Hum Hai Tumhare Tum Humare" - Mahendra Kapoor, Hemlata
