= Kanoon (1994 film) =

1994 Indian film by Sushma Shiromani

- Directed by: Sushma Shiromani
- Written by: Sushma Shiromani; Ranveer Pushp
- Produced by: Sushma Shiromani
- Starring: Ajay Devgan; Urmila Matondkar
- Music by: Raamlaxman
- Production company: Shiromani Chitra
- Release date: 1 April 1994
- Running time: 152 minutes
- Country: India
- Language: Hindi

Kanoon (transl. The law) is a 1994 Indian Hindi-language film directed and produced by Sushma Shiromani under her own production Shiromani Chitra and starring Ajay Devgan and Urmila Matondkar in lead roles.

== Plot ==
Vishal returns from police training to find most of his family — father Dharmadhikari Singh (Alok Nath), mother, and elder brother Pankaj (Arun Govil), who was also a police officer — murdered by Raja Thakur (Gulshan Grover). Only his sister-in-law (Reema Lagoo) and nephew are alive.

This is the same Raja Thakur who harboured ill will against the family, and it all started when Dharmadhikari, as a judge, sentenced his father to death.

Things only escalate after Thakur and his brothers' paths cross with those of Dharmadhikari and Pankaj.

However, Thakur finds an ally in a crooked advocate named Dhananjay (Prem Chopra), who not only gets the Thakur siblings out of their legal troubles but also gets his identical twin killed to benefit them.

Vishal is eventually blamed for the murder of Police Commissioner Kiran Shroff (Kiran Kumar)'s son, who was also allied with the Thakurs.

Dhananjay, by now a judge, convicts and imprisons Vishal after the public prosecutor makes it appear that Vishal killed the man over a dispute because the latter was pimping out his own sister Shalu, who happens to be Vishal's love.

Vishal uses the same subterfuge Thakur used to get out of jail temporarily without leaving behind any evidence, and kills one of Thakur's brothers.

In the end, Thakur is about to kill Vishal's sister-in-law and nephew, having captured the commissioner, when Vishal arrives and kills him and his henchmen. Vishal also gets Dhananjay to confess in court how he helped Thakur carry out his reign of terror, for which he is arrested and faces legal action as well as criminal proceedings.

== Cast ==
- Ajay Devgn as Vishal Singh
- Urmila Matondkar as Shalu
- Kiran Kumar as Police Commissioner Kiran Shroff
- Prem Chopra as Advocate Dhananjay
- Gulshan Grover as Raja Thakur
- Alok Nath as Judge Dharmadhikari Singh
- Asha Sharma as Mrs. Dharmadhikari Singh
- Arun Govil as Pankaj Singh
- Reema Lagoo as Mrs. Pankaj Singh
- Ajay Nagrath as Ravi
- Yunus Parvez as Jailor
- Johnny Lever as Lakhiya
- Ishrat Ali as Chaturvedi
- Sudhir Dalvi as Public Prosecutor
- Bharat Kapoor as Inspector Desai

== Soundtrack ==
Soundtrack is available on Tips Music. Background Score is by Shyam-Surender. The lyricists are Maya Govind, Faaiz Anwar and Rani Malik.

| Song | Singer |
|---|---|
| "Mere Dil Pe Kiye Hai" | S. P. Balasubrahmanyam |
| "Mere Dil Pe Kiye Hai Jo Tune" (Duet) | Lata Mangeshkar, S. P. Balasubrahmanyam |
| "Balma Arzi Meri" | Lata Mangeshkar |
| "Tujhe Lift Car Mein" | Lata Mangeshkar, Kumar Sanu |
| "Jack And Jill Went" | Lata Mangeshkar, Kumar Sanu |
| "Kya Khata Hai Meri" | Lata Mangeshkar, Kumar Sanu |
| "Main Bani Hoon Sirf" | Lata Mangeshkar, Kumar Sanu |
| "Madhosh Dil Hai" | Vinod Rathod |
