= Kranthiveera Sangolli Rayanna (1967 film) =

Sangolli Rayanna
- Directed by: B. T. Athani; Gurubala
- Written by: Ranjit Desai (Translation: T. K. Patil) (dialogues)
- Screenplay by: Rajajith Desai
- Story by: Rajajith Desai
- Produced by: Neminatha Gat
- Starring: V. S. Patil; Kamini Kadam; Dada Salavi; Rajashekar
- Cinematography: Shankar Savekar
- Edited by: Vasantha Shelake
- Music by: Lakshman Beralekar
- Production company: Chithravani
- Distributed by: Chithravani
- Release date: 4 January 1966
- Running time: 135 min
- Country: India
- Language: Kannada

Krantiveera Sangolli Rayanna ( transl. Revolutionary warrior Sangolli Rayanna) is a 1967 Indian Kannada-language film, directed by B. T. Athani and produced by Neminatha Gat. The film stars V. S. Patil, Kamini Kadam, Dada Salavi, and Rajashekar in lead roles. The film had a musical score by Lakshman Beralekar.

== Cast ==
- V. S. Patil
- Kamini Kadam
- Dada Salavi
- Rajashekar
- Leela Gandhi
- Saroja Borakara
- Thara
- Shanthamma
- Renukadevi
- Chandrakantha
- Gururaja
- Kodanda Rao
- Padesura Basavaraj
- Srinath
- Maruthi Pailwan
- Sharanayya
- Rama Sevekari
- Sannachari
- Obaleshwara
- Abhi Bhattacharya in a guest appearance

== Soundtrack ==
The movie has 7 songs composed by Laxman Baralekar. The songs are sung by Lata Mangeshkar, Usha Mangeshkar, Asha Bhosle and Manna Dey. Mangeshkar sisters made their debut in Kannada. Lata's song "Bellane Belagayithu" was well received.

| No. | Title | Lyrics | Singers | Length |
|---|---|---|---|---|
| 1. | "Bellane Belagaayitu" | Bhujendra Mahishawadi | Lata Mangeshkar |
| 2. | "Ellare Iratiro Endaare Baratiro" | P. B. Dhuttharagi | Lata Mangeshkar |
| 3. | "Yako Yeno Seraga Nillavaldu" | | Asha Bhonsle |
| 4. | "Yaariva Nan Mana Marulaagisidava" | | Usha Mangeshkar |
| 5. | "Neere Ninu Baare Bega" | | Manna Dey |
| 6. | "Jagavidu Sojiga" | | Manna Dey |
| 7. | "Gurumaraneya Madu" |
