= Pyar Ka Karz =

- Film poster
- Directed by: K.Bapaiah
- Produced by: Sushma Shiromani
- Starring: Dharmendra; Mithun Chakraborty; Meenakshi Seshadri; Neelam
- Music by: Laxmikant–Pyarelal
- Release date: 2 March 1990
- Running time: 130 minutes
- Country: India
- Language: Hindi

Pyar Ka Karz (Debt of Love) is a 1990 Indian Hindi-language action film directed by K. Bapaiah, starring Dharmendra, Mithun Chakraborty and Meenakshi Seshadri.

== Plot ==
Ravi Shankar is a famous singer and musician. His path crosses with that of three women. Naina is a doctor who saves Ravi's life twice. Mona is a criminal sent to kill him, but stops when she falls in love with him. Seema is a girl from a wealthy family being blackmailed by a gang that distributes drugs.

Ravi marries Seema. When Seema and their child are killed Ravi joins the local mafia and starts killing high-ranking officials. The police are looking for him. Maya who knows why Ravi took this path persuades the police inspector to bail him out.

== Cast ==
- Dharmendra as Shekhar "Shaka"
- Mithun Chakraborty as Ravi Shankar
- Meenakshi Seshadri as Dr. Naina
- Neelam as Seema
- Sonam as Mona
- Vinod Mehra as Police Commissioner Arun Kumar
- Kader Khan as Constable / Sub-Inspector Nakedar Subedar
- Aruna Irani as Indumati Sarpotdar
- Shakti Kapoor as Lal
- Raza Murad as Rajpal
- Asrani as Constable Lapetkar
- Rajendranath as Doctor
- Vikram Gokhale as Mr. Sanyal
- Viju Khote as Sub-Inspector Naik
- Vikas Anand as DIG

== Music ==
Anand Bakshi wrote the songs.

1. "Naina Tere Naino Ki" (Part 1) – Amit Kumar
2. "Ek Saal Chalega Apna Honeymoon" – Sudesh Bhosle, Alka Yagnik
3. "Sabse Pehla Yeh Kaam Kiya" – Kavita Krishnamurthy, Amit Kumar
4. "Laagi Nahin Chhute Rama" – Anuradha Paudwal, Sudesh Bhosle
5. "I Love You, Ye Jo Aag Lagi Hai Dil Me" – Sudesh Bhosle, Anuradha Paudwal
6. "Naina Tere Naino Ki" (Part 2) – Amit Kumar
