= Chatak Chandni =

1982 film

- Theatrical release poster
- Directed by: Prakash Bhende
- Produced by: Uma Prakash Bhende
- Starring: Jayshree T.; Prakash Bhende; Lalita Pawar; Nilu Phule; Bal Karve; Aarati Savur
- Music by: Srikant Telang
- Release date: 1982
- Country: India
- Language: Marathi

Chatak Chandni (transl. Bright moonlight) is a 1982 Indian Marathi-language film directed by Prakash Bhende and produced by Uma Bhende.

== Cast ==
The cast includes Jayshree T., Prakash Bhende, Lalita Pawar, Nilu Phule, Dhumal, Bal Karve and others.

== Soundtrack ==
The music has been composed by Shrikant Telang, while lyrics have been written by Sudhir Moghe.

=== Track listing ===
| No. | Title | Performer(s) | Length |
|---|---|---|---|
| 1. | "Parvyachi Jodi Ghume" | Jaywant Kulkarni, Usha Mangeshkar | 3:10 |
| 2. | "Kamrechi Lachak Dolyati Chamak" | Jaywant Kulkarni, Usha Mangeshkar | 3:23 |
| 3. | "Yel Sonyachi Vaya Jaeel" | Jaywant Kulkarni, Usha Mangeshkar | 4:44 |
| 4. | "Lukuluku Lakhlakhati" | Usha Mangeshkar | 3:15 |
| 5. | "Naandtes Too Ditheet Majhya" | Jaywant Kulkarni, Usha Mangeshkar | 3:52 |
| 6. | "Sajana Tujhya Vina" | Usha Mangeshkar | 5:13 |
