= Apan Yana Pahilat Ka =

Aapan Yana Pahilat Ka - Marathi Movie
- Theatrical release poster
- Directed by: Prakash Bhende
- Written by: Datta Keshav
- Produced by: Uma Prakash Bhende
- Starring: Vikram Gokhale; Girish Pardeshi; Hemangi Rao; Uma Bhende; Resham Tipnis; Prakash Bhende; Upendra Date
- Edited by: Anil Gandhi
- Music by: Dattaraj
- Production company: Shriprasad Chitra
- Release date: April 1992
- Country: India
- Language: Marathi

Aapan Yana Pahilat Ka (transl. Did you see them?) is a 1992 Indian Marathi-language romantic drama film directed by Prakash Bhende and produced by Uma Bhende. Aapan Yana Pahilat Ka was released in April 1992.

== Cast ==
The movie stars Vikram Gokhale, Girish Pardeshi, Hemangi Rao, Uma Bhende, Prakash Bhende, Upendra Date, Resham Tipnis and others.

== Soundtrack ==
The music score has been provided and composed by Dattaraj Khot.
