= Bhalu =

- Theatrical release poster
- Directed by: Rajdutt
- Written by: Baba Kadam
- Produced by: Uma Bhende
- Starring: Prakash Bhende; Uma Bhende; Nilu Phule; Ranjana; Vikram Gokhale; Chandrakant; Nana Patekar
- Music by: Vishwanath More
- Release date: October 1980
- Country: India
- Language: Marathi

Bhalu (transl. The Bear) is a Marathi-language movie released in October 1980. The movie has been produced by Uma Bhende and directed by Rajdutt.

== Plot ==
Orphaned during her childhood, Sajjala is raised by Appakaka, an ex-army man who is a dear friend of Sajjala's father. He fixed her marriage to Advocate Jayantrao, son of Jagirdar, but of Ramrao rank; The sly and shrewd chieftain of the village cannot bear this and convinces the zamindar against Sajjala. Instead, dampening her spirit, Sajja sends a letter through her faithful and loyal companion Bhaa, clearing Jayantrao of his misunderstanding. Police Inspector Khandekar, who is Jayantrao's friend, exposes Ramrao's plot. When Jayantrao confronts Ramrao, he brazenly refuses. Ramrao later poisons Jayantrao, but Appakaka is tricked and arrested. As Jayantrao is on his deathbed, lawyer MLA Pawar's niece Sumitra accepts the challenge to release Appakaka.

== Cast ==
- Nilu Phule as Ramrao Rank
- Ranjana as Sumitra
- Prakash Bhende as Jayantrao
- Uma Bhende as Sajjala
- Vikram Gokhale as Fauzdar Sudhir Khandekar
- Nana Patekar as Rangarao
- Vasant Shinde as Sada
- Viju Khote
- Chandrakant Kulkarni
- Asha Patil as Maina
- Raja Mayekar as Balsha
- Majnakar

== Soundtrack ==
Music

The music was directed by Vishwanath More.

Lyrics

The lyrics is written by P. Savalaram

=== Track listing ===
No.	Title	performer(s)	Length
1.	"Gandh Phulancha Gela Sangun"	Suresh Wadkar, Asha Bhosle	3:24
2.	"Alyad Navri Palyad Navra"	Jayavant Kulkarni, Usha Mangeshkar
3.	"Parnpachu Savala Savala"	Sudhir Phadke
