= Sumati Gupte-Joglekar =

Indian actress

- Sumati in 1941
- Born: Sumati Gupte; 11 May 1919; Wai, Satara, British India
- Died: 31 October 2009 (aged 90); Mumbai, India
- Years active: 1940 - 1979
- Spouse: Vasant Joglekar (m. 1943)

Sumati Gupte-Joglekar (11 May 1919– 31 October 2009) was an Indian actress and producer who made significant contributions to Marathi and Hindi cinema and theatre. Beginning her career with Marathi films and stage, she expanded into Hindi cinema, later moving behind the camera as a producer and writer with her husband’s banner. In 1999, Sumati was honoured with the V. Shantaram Lifetime Achievement Award, Maharashtra's highest award in the field of cinema.

== Early life ==
Joglekar was born on May 11, 1919, in Wai, Satara district, Maharashtra. She was the daughter of a judge and spent much of her childhood and education in Baroda, Gujarat.

After completing her graduation, she pursued acting—a challenging path at the time for women—leveraging connections through family friends to join the Prabhat Film Company.

== Personal life ==
While working on Chimukla Sansar, she met director Vasant Joglekar; they married in 1943 and she henceforth became known as Sumati Gupte-Joglekar. The couple had three daughters: Meera, Chanda, and Madhushri.

== Career ==
She debuted in the bilingual Marathi-Hindi film Sant Dnyaneshwar (1940), where she also performed two songs. She gained recognition in Bhalji Pendharkar’s historical drama Thoratanchi Kamla (1941), portraying Sambhaji’s fiancée, followed by roles in Navardeo, Chimukla Sansar (1943), and Sunbai (1942).

Gupte-Jokelar developed a strong presence in Marathi stage theatre, performing in plays such as Sanshaykallol, Udyacha Sansar, Sanyasta Khadag, Lagnachi Bedi, and Vikarvilasit. Her career expanded into Hindi films with roles in Hamara Sansar (1945), Sharbati Aankhen (1945), Santan (1946), Veer Ghatotkach (1949), Nand Kishore (1951), Shiv Leela (1952), Samaj (1954), Mausi (1958), Kareegar (1958), Keechak Vadh (1959), Waqt (1965), Parivar (1968), Adhikar (1971), Jalte Badan (1973), Paise Ki Gudiya (1974), Sajjo Rani (1976), and Aadmi Sadak Ka (1977).

She and Vasant Joglekar co-founded the Mera Pictures production banner. Under this, she produced several Marathi films including Shevatcha Malusara (1966), Ha Khel Savalyancha (1976), and Janaki (1979).

In the film Ha Khel Savalyancha, she contributed as writer and producer; the film was directed by Vasant Joglekar and received acclaim, including awards for its music and cinematography. She also helped launch her daughter Meera in the film Ek Kali Muskayee (1968), where Meera starred opposite Joy Mukherjee.

== Death ==
Gupte-Jokelar died on October 31, 2009, at the age of 90.

== Honors and recognition ==
Gupte-Jokelar was honoured with several awards, among them the V. Shantaram Award, and the Chitrabhushan Jeevan Gaurav (Lifetime Achievement) Award.
