= Leela Gandhi (actress) =

Indian actress (1938)

- Born: 1 June 1938 (age 88); Kolhapur, Bombay Presidency, British India (now in Maharashtra, India)
- Occupations: Actress; Choreographer
- Years active: 1951–1992

Leela Gandhi (1 June 1938) is an Indian actress and choreographer who worked in Marathi cinema. She was the recipient of various accolades, receiving two Maharashtra State Film Awards, and a Zee Chitra Gaurav Puraskar. In 2011, Gandhi was honoured with the V. Shantaram Lifetime Achievement Award, Maharashtra's highest award in the field of cinema.

== Early life and career ==
Gandhi began training in Kathak dance under Govind Nikam when she was eight years old. In 1951, director Dinkar D. Patil made the Hindi film Gharbar, based on his successful Marathi film Ram Ram Pahune. Gandhi assisted in choreographing a dance sequence featuring Gop and Paro.

On one occasion, Gandhi accompanied her guru, Govind Nikam, to the residence of actor-director Bhagwan Dada. There, she met dance instructor Robert, who was a close associate of Nikam. After learning about her dancing abilities, Bhagwan Dada offered her opportunities to perform in his films, including Rangila (1953), Hallagulla (1954), and Bhala Aadmi (1958). Robert later invited Gandhi to perform a dance in Baghdad Ki Raaten. The sequence was set before the villain, played by Shyam, while the hero, played by Mahipal, was tied up nearby. Although Gandhi completed the dance successfully, the film was never released. She subsequently performed alongside Helen in Bus Conductor, in a sequence that combined Helen's bhangra with Gandhi's lavani.

Director Raja Thakur saw one of Gandhi's dance performances and invited her to participate in the programme Reshmachya Gathi. Vasant Pawar and Mohammed were initially expected to choreograph the performance. However, after observing Gandhi's abilities, Pawar suggested that she choreograph her own dance. Gandhi performed to the song “Ishkachya Rangat Vij Bhare Angat”, marking her debut in Marathi cinema.

Gandhi's dance performance with Hindi actor Agha in Preetisangam (1957) became popular. Beginning with Sangtye Aika (1959), she worked as a choreographer for several films. She also appeared as a supporting actress in Kela Ishara Jata Jata (1965). Alongside her film career, she worked in theatre and performed in approximately 75 films and 25 plays. Her theatrical work included a performance in the Sanskrit play Mahakavi Kalidas. Her performances in Katha Aklecha Kandyachi attracted the attention of composer Vasant Desai. Desai recommended her to director Hrishikesh Mukherjee, who subsequently invited her to perform in the “Sawal Jawab” sequence in the Hindi film Aashirwad. Gandhi's dance in the film received attention.

After retiring from acting and dancing in films and theatre, Gandhi served as a director of Cosmos Bank and as president of the Akhil Bharatiya Natya Parishad. She also served as a member of the government's Rangbhoomi Prayog Parinirikshan Mandal, a body responsible for examining theatrical performances.

== Personal life ==
Gandhi married Mr. Ronghe, a businessman involved in the transport industry, and settled in Pune. The couple had three daughters, all of whom were married.

== Filmography ==
Year	Title	Role	Notes
1951	Gharbar	Herself	As choreographer
1953	Rangila	Herself	As choreographer
1954	Hallagulla	Herself	As choreographer
1957	Preetisangam	Herself	As choreographer
1958	Bhala Aadmi	Herself	As choreographer
1959	Bus Conductor	Herself	As choreographer
1959	Sangtye Aika	Herself	As choreographer
1959	Sata Janmachi Sobati	Herself	As choreographer
1963	Vaybhav	Leelabai	Debut as actress
1965	Kela Ishara Jata Jata	Sonabai	
1967	Sant Gora Kumbhar		
1967	Pahila Bhau		
1967	Deva Tujhi Soniyachi Jejuri		
1968	Aashirwad	Herself	In a song "Saaf Karo, Insaf Karo"
1969	Manacha Mujra	Bhingri	
1971	Lakhat Ashi Dekhni	Vithabai Dalgaonkar	
1973	Bholi Bhabdi		
1974	Kartiki		Maharashtra State Film Award for Best Supporting Actress
1975	Pandoba Porgi Phasali		
1976	Pudhari	Hausabai Akka	
1978	Sarvasakshi		
1978	Sushila	Herself	In the song “Kunya Gavacha Aala Pakharu"
1978	Irsha		
1978	Chandaal Chowkadi		
1979	Lage Bandhe		
1980	Fatakadi		
1980	Sahkar Samrat		
1980	Paij		Maharashtra State Film Award for Best Supporting Actress
1981	Satichi Punyayee		
1981	Manacha Kunku	Manjula Deshmukh	
1981	Aai	Salubai	
1982	Bhamta		
1986	Dhakti Sun		
1987	Bhatak Bhavani		
1988	Bandiwan Mi Ya Sansari		
1992	Shubh Mangal Savdhan		

== Accolades ==
- 1974 – Maharashtra State Film Award for Best Supporting Actress for Kartiki
- 1980 – Maharashtra State Film Award for Best Supporting Actress for Paij
- 2011 – V. Shantaram Lifetime Achievement Award from Government of Maharashtra
- 2014 – Dadasaheb Phalke Lifetime Achievement Award
- 2016 – Zee Chitra Gaurav Lifetime Achievement Award from Zee Marathi
- 2024 – PIFF Distinguished Award
- 2025 – Bal Gandharva Award
