= Kamini Kadam =

Indian actress

- Born: Manik Mudliar; 3 August 1933; Bombay Presidency, British India
- Died: 19 June 2000 (aged 66); Mumbai, Maharashtra, India
- Occupation: Actress
- Years active: 1955–1967
- Spouse: Anil G. Kadam (m. 1960)

Kamini Kadam (3 August 1933 – 19 June 2000), popularly known as Kamini Kadam, is an Indian actress who acted in several Marathi, Kannada and Hindi films in the 1950s and 1960s.

== Early life ==
Kamini Kadam was born on 3 August 1933 as Manik Mudaliar in Belagavi, Karnataka, was the sister-in-law of cinematographer V. Avadhoot. At the age of seven, she relocated to Bombay to live with her sister for her formal education. She attended the Orient High School and G.E.I. Girls High School in Dadar, where she developed a keen interest in athletics. During her school years, she excelled in traditional outdoor sports, including Hututu, Kabaddi, and Kho-Kho.

While she originally intended to pursue sports as a career, her trajectory shifted following an introduction to filmmaker Bhalji Pendharkar. Despite her proficient background in sports and lack of prior training in acting, Pendharkar selected her for a role in the 1955 film Ye Re Mazya Maglya. Under Pendharkar's mentorship, she made her acting debut alongside established contemporary artists such as Damuanna Malvankar, Shashikala, and Baburao Pendharkar. Noting her cheerful expressions, Pendharkar gave her the screen name "Smita."

== Career ==
She made her debut in Marathi films under the screen name of Smita in 1955 in Yere Maazya Magalya. She acted in a number of Marathi films before switching over to Hindi films. In 1958, Kadam changed her screen name to Kamini Kadam and made her debut in Hindi films with Talaq (1958) opposite Rajendra Kumar. Other notable Hindi films to her credit include Santan (1959), School Master (1959) and Sapne Suhane (1961). Kamini Kadam died on 19 June 2000 at the age of 66.

== Filmography ==
Year	Film	Role	Language	Notes
1955	Yere Mazya Maglya	Smita	Marathi	Marathi debut
1956	Devghar	Vasanti	Marathi	
1956	Andhala Magto Dola	Smita	Marathi	
1957	Dev Jaaga Aahe	Manik	Marathi	
1957	Devagharcha Lena	Baby	Marathi	
1957	Navra Mhanu Naye Apla	Bayko	Marathi	
1957	Pahila Prem	Smita	Marathi	
1958	Talaq	Indu Chaubey	Hindi	Hindi debut
1958	Dhakti Jaao	Shobha	Marathi	
1958	Don Ghadicha Daav	Suman	Marathi	
1959	Santan	Shobha	Hindi	
1959	School Master	Master's wife	Hindi	
1960	Maa Baap	Sarita	Hindi	
1960	Miya Bibi Razi	Kamla	Hindi	
1961	Sapne Suhane	Bela	Hindi	
1963	Maza Hoshil Ka?	Anu	Marathi	
1965	Sudharlelya Bayka	Sandhya Bhosale	Marathi	
1966	Sheras Savvasher	Sushma	Marathi	
1967	Kranthiveera Sangolli Rayanna	Mallava - Rayanna's wife	Kannada	
1967	Santh Wahate Krishnamai	Doctor Bai	Marathi	
1968	Dharmapatni	Smitabai	Marathi	
