= Premasathi Vattel Te =

Premasathi Vattel Te - Marathi Movie
- Theatrical release poster
- Directed by: Dutta Keshav
- Produced by: Uma Prakash Bhende
- Starring: Uma Bhende; Ashok Saraf; Laxmikant Berde; Padma Chavan; Sudhir Joshi
- Music by: Shrikant Telang
- Release date: May 1987
- Country: India
- Language: Marathi

Premasathi Vattel Te is a Marathi movie released in May 1987. Produced by Uma Prakash Bhende and directed by Dutta Keshav.

== Cast ==
- Uma Bhende
- Prakash Bhende
- Ashok Saraf
- Laxmikant Berde
- Kanchan Adhikari
- Padma Chavan
- Sudhir Joshi
- Sukanya Kulkarni
- Atmaram Bhende
- Manorama Wagle

== Soundtrack ==
The music is provided by Shrikant Telang.
