= Aamhi Jato Amuchya Gava =

- Theatrical release poster
- Directed by: Kamalakar Torne
- Story by: Madhusudan Kalelkar
- Produced by: Kamlakar Torne
- Starring: Suryakant; Uma Bhende; Shrikant Moghe; Ganesh Solanki; Ramchandra Warde
- Cinematography: Ratnakar Lad
- Edited by: N. S. Vaidya
- Music by: Sudhir Phadke
- Production company: Prem Chitra
- Release date: 9 August 1968
- Running time: 95 minutes
- Country: India
- Language: Marathi

Amhi Jaato Amucha Gava (transl. We are living for our village) is a Marathi language film released on 9 August 1968. The film was remade in Tamil as Moondru Deivangal and in Hindi as Teen Chor.

== Plot ==
Shridhar Pant is a businessman who lives with his wife, Laxmi, and daughter, Vaijayanti. His business partner, Shamrao Khapartonde, takes advantage of his trusting nature, by giving him business loans and tricking him into signing away everything he owns. Now, Khapartonde is threatening to ruin Pant if he does not agree to marry his daughter to Khapartonde's son, who has mental problems.

One day, three travelers—Santaji, Dhanaji, and Sayaji—arrive at Pant's house and ask for shelter. Pant kindly lets them stay. However, these men are actually criminals who have escaped from jail and plan to steal from Pant. But after seeing Pant's troubles, they change their minds and decide to help him instead.

== Cast ==
- Uma Bhende as Vaijayanti Pant
- Shrikant Moghe as Arun
- Dhumal as Dhanaji
- Suryakant as Santaji
- Ganesh Solanki as Sayaji
- Ramchandra Warde as Shamrao Khapartonde
- Madhu Apte as Khapartonde's mentally challenged son
- Jaishankar Danve as Shridhar Pant
- Mai Bhide as Laxmi Pant

== Reception ==
The shooting for the film started in 1963, but due to budget issues, it was released in 1968. When it finally came out, it achieved a big success and won nine Maharashtra State Film Awards.

== Soundtrack ==
The music was composed by Sudhir Phadke.

=== Track listing ===
| No. | Title | Performer(s) | Length |
|---|---|---|---|
| 1. | "Swapnat Rangale Mee" | Asha Bhonsle, Sudhir Phadke | 3:26 |
| 2. | "Mee Aaj Phul Jhale" | Asha Bhonsle | 3:07 |
| 3. | "Mala He Dattaguru Disale" | Asha Bhonsle | 2:59 |
| 4. | "Hawas Maj tu" | Asha Bhonsle | 3:23 |
| 5. | "Dehachi Tijori" | Sudhir Phadke | 3:23 |
