= Uma Bhende =

Indian actress (1945–2017)

- Born: Anusaya Sakarikar; 31 May 1945; Bombay, Bombay State, India
- Died: 19 July 2017 (aged 72); Mumbai, Maharashtra, India
- Occupation: Actress
- Years active: 1960–2000
- Spouse: Prakash Bhende (m. 1974)
- Children: 2
- Family: Bhende family
- Awards: Chitrabhushan

Uma Bhende (31 May 1945 – 19 July 2017) was an Indian actress who worked in Marathi films, television and theatre. She made her debut in Marathi film Aakshganga (1960). She is known for appearing in movies Aamhi Jato Amchya Gava (1968), Angai (1968), Bhalu (1980). Bhende was felicitated by Chitrabhushan Award for her contribution towards Marathi film industry.

== Early life ==
Uma was born on 31 May 1945 as Anusaya Shrikrishna Sakarikar in Mumbai, though her childhood was spent in a middle-class household in Kolhapur. Her father, Shrikrishna Sakarikar, was a writer and playwright, while her mother, Ramadevi, was employed with the Prabhat Film Company.

During her youth, she participated in local cultural gatherings and performance troupes, where her work was noticed by the prominent filmmaker Bhalji Pendharkar. This exposure led to her first minor appearance on screen, featuring in a song sequence picturized on actress Sulochana Latkar in Pendharkar's film Akashganga.

== Career ==
While preparing for her first leading role in Madhav Shinde’s film Thoratanchi Kamala, she discovered on the day of the premier in Kolhapur that her birth name, Anusaya, was missing from the promotional posters. The film's producer, Lata Mangeshkar, subsequently informed her that she had been given the screen name "Uma."

Following this debut, she appeared in a series of Marathi films, including Yalach Mhanatat Prem, Shevatcha Malusara, Madhuchandra, and Aamhi Jato Amuchya Gava. She also transitioned briefly into Hindi cinema, debuting in Rajshri Productions' Dosti, directed by Satyen Bose. Her subsequent Hindi film credits included Ek Dil Sau Afsane, Ek Masoom, Brahma Vishnu Mahesh, and Har Har Mahadev. However, due to the logistical challenges of commuting between Kolhapur and Mumbai, she chose to shift her primary focus back to Marathi cinema.

Her filmography also extended to other regional languages, including roles in the Chhattisgarhi film Kahi Debe Sandesh and the Telugu film Khiladi. For her performance in Ashi Hi Sataryachi Tarha, she was awarded the Maharashtra State Film Award for Best Actress.

In 2012, she was honored with the 'Chitrabhushan' Award by the Akhil Bharatiya Marathi Chitrapat Mahamandala, recognizing her contributions spanning a 55-year acting career.

Following her marriage to filmmaker and actor Prakash Bhende, she relocated to the Sion neighborhood of Mumbai. Professionally, she collaborated extensively with her husband, appearing in several films produced or directed under their banner, including Bhalu, Chatak Chandni, Premasathi Vattel Te, Apan Yana Pahilat Ka, and Aai Thor Tujhe Upkar. Throughout her later years, she and her husband remained active members of the Marathi film fraternity, frequently participating in industry events and maintaining connections with younger generations of filmmakers and artists.

== Filmography ==
Year	Film	Role	Language	Notes
1960	Aakashganga	Unnamed	Marathi	Small role
1960	Antaricha Diva	Uma	Marathi	
1962	Thoratanchi Kamala	Kamala	Marathi	
1964	Swayamvar Zale Siteche	Sita	Marathi	
1965	Malhari Martand	Kamala	Marathi	
1965	Shevatcha Malusara	Savitri	Marathi	
1965	Laxmi Aali Ghara	Laxmi	Marathi	
1967	Madhuchandra	Malu	Marathi	
1967	Sudarshan		Marathi	
1967	Sant Gora Kumbhar	Santu	Marathi	
1967	Kaka Mala Vachwa	Vinu	Marathi	
1967	Deiva Janile Kuni	Anu	Marathi	
1967	Bara Varshe Saha Mahine Saha Divas		Marathi	
1968	Angai	Aai	Marathi	
1968	Aamhi Jato Amuchya Gava	Vaijayanti Pant	Marathi	
1968	Bai Mothi Bhagyachi	Bharti	Marathi	
1970	Dhartichi Lekara	Shevanti	Marathi	
1970	Ganane Ghungroo Haravale	Manjula	Marathi	
1971	Naate Jadle Don Jivanche		Marathi	
1972	Pach Najook Bote	Mira	Marathi	
1972	Be-Imaan	Sapna 's friend	Hindi	
1972	Har Har Mahadev	Paro	Hindi	
1974	Ashi Hi Sataryachi Tarha	Rangu	Marathi	Maharashtra State Film Award for Best Actress
1980	Bhalu	Jayantrao's Wife	Marathi	
1982	Chatak Chandni		Marathi	
1987	Premasathi Vattel Te	Rama	Marathi	
1992	Apan Yana Pahilat Ka		Marathi	
1999	Aai Thor Tujhe Upkar	Aai	Marathi	

== See also ==
- Marathi cinema
