= Sant Dnyaneshwar (film) =

1940 Marathi language film

- Theatrical release poster
- Directed by: Vishnupant Govind Damle; Sheikh Fattelal
- Written by: Anand Kumar; Shivram Vashika
- Based on: Dnyaneshwar
- Starring: Shahu Modak; Sumati Gupte; Datta Dharmadhikari; Pandit
- Production company: Prabhat Film Company
- Release date: 18 May 1940
- Running time: 139 min
- Country: India
- Languages: Hindi; Marathi
- Box office: ₹4.67 crore

Sant Dnyaneshwar

Sant Dnyaneshwar is a 1940 Marathi-Hindi biographical devotional film directed by Vishnupant Govind Damle and Sheikh Fattelal and produced by Prabhat Film Company. The film was released on 18 May 1940 and is based on the life of the 13th-century Marathi saint and poet Dnyaneshwar. It stars Shahu Modak, Sumati Gupte, Datta Dharmadhikari, Govind and Sumitra in prominent roles. The film was a commercial success.

== Plot ==
Dnyaneshwar was the second of the four children of Vitthal Govind Kulkarni and Rukmini, a pious couple from Apegaon near Paithan on the banks of the river Godavari. Vitthal had studied Vedas and set out on pilgrimages at a young age. In Alandi, about 30 km from Pune, Sidhopant, a local Yajurveda Brahmin was very much impressed with him and Vitthal married his daughter Rukmini.

After some time, getting permission from Rukmini, Vitthal went to Varanasi in Uttar Pradesh, where he met Ramananda Swami and requested to be initiated into sannyas, lying about his marriage. But Ramananda Swami later went to Alandi and, convinced that his student Vitthal was the husband of Rukmini, he returned to Kashi and ordered Vitthal to return home to his family. The couple was excommunicated from the Brahmin caste as Vitthal had broken with sannyas, the last of the four ashrams. Four children were born to them; Nivrutti, Dnyaneshwar, Sopan, Mukta. It is believed that later Vitthal and Rukmini ended their lives by jumping into the waters at Prayag where the river Ganges meets Yamuna, hoping that their children would be accepted into the society after their death.

This is the point at which the film starts. The orphaned children grew up on alms. They approached the Brahmin community of Paithan to accept them, but the Brahmins refused. According to the disputed "Shuddhi Patra", the children were purified by the Brahmins on the condition of observing celibacy. But when they returned, the Brahmins did not pay any attention to the Shuddhi Patra and said that it was fake. Later, a farmer took them to live with his family, where Jñāneśvar translated the Bhagavad Gita into the Marathi language and performed many miracles; riding on a flying wall was the most famous of these.

== Cast ==
- Shahu Modak as Dnyaneshwar
  - Yashwant Nikam as Young Dnyaneshwar
- Sumati Gupte as Narmada
  - Manju as Young Narmada
- Datta Dharmadhikari as Sopan
  - Govind Nikam as Young Sopan
- Pandit as Nivruttinath
  - Madhukar Nikam as Young Nivruttinath
- Sumitra as Muktabai
  - Malti as Young Muktabai
- Tamhankar as Vitthal Kulkarni
- Shanta Majumdar as Rukmini Kulkarni
- Bhagwat as Vissoba
- Sundarabai as Vissoba's wife
- Shankar Kulkarni as Gangadhar Shastri
- Ulhas as Vidyadhar Shastri
- Ganpatrao as Changdev
- Vasant Desai as Craftsman

== Release and reception ==
The film was released on 18 May 1940 and was distributed in both Marathi and Hindi. The film was produced by Prabhat Film Company and directed by Vishnupant Damle and Sheikh Fattelal. It became a major commercial success, running for 36 weeks in cinema halls in both Pune and Mumbai and earned ₹4.67 crore during its theatrical run.

The film was also notable for its international release. It was released commercially in the United States under the title Dnyandev, Light of Asia. The film's international exhibition was part of Prabhat Film Company's efforts to present Indian devotional cinema to audiences outside India.
