= List of Marathi films of 2018 =

This is a list of Marathi (Indian Marathi-language) films that were released in 2018.

== Box office collection ==
| Rank | Film | Production Company | Worldwide gross | Ref(s) |
|---|---|---|---|---|
| 1 | Naal | Zee Studios | ₹31.3 crore (US$3.3 million) | |
| 2 | Mauli | Mumbai Film Company | ₹26.12 crore (US$2.7 million) | |
| 3 | Aapla Manus | Ajay Devgn FFilms; Watergate Production | ₹25 crore (US$2.6 million) | |
| 4 | Ani... Dr. Kashinath Ghanekar | Viacom18 Motion Pictures; Shree Ganesh Marketing & Films | ₹16 crore (US$1.7 million) | |
| 5 | Boyz 2 | Everest Entertainment; Supreme Motion Pictures; Ekvira Productions; L. V. Shinde Group | ₹16 crore (US$1.7 million) | |
| 6 | Baban | The Folk Confluence Entertainment Group; Chitraksha Films | ₹15 crore (US$1.6 million) | |
| 7 | Mumbai Pune Mumbai 3 | Eros International; 52 Friday Cinemas; Everest Entertainment | ₹15 crore (US$1.6 million) | |
| 8 | Mulshi Pattern | Abhijeet Bhosale Genuine Production; Punit Balan Entertainment | ₹11 crore (US$1.1 million) | |
| 9 | Farzand | Swami Samarth Creations LLP | ₹10 crore (US$1.0 million) | |
| 10 | Bucket List | Dark Horse Cinemas; DAR Motion Pictures; Blue Mustang Creations | ₹6 crore (US$620,000) | |

== January – March ==
| Opening | | Title | Director | Cast | Ref. |
|---|---|---|---|---|---|
| J A N | 5 | Ye Re Ye Re Paisa | Sanjay Jadhav | Umesh Kamat, Siddhartha Jadhav, Tejaswini Pandit | |
| J A N | 12 | Barayan | Deepak Patil | Nandu Madhav, Anurag Worlikar, Pratiksha Lonkar | |
| J A N | 14 | Mhorkya | Amar Bharat Deokar | Raman Deokar, Amar Deokar | |
| J A N | 19 | Veda BF | Altaf Dadasaheb Shaikh | Nagesh Bhonsle, Vinit Bonde, and Altaf Raja | |
| F E B | 9 | Aapla Manus | Satish Rajwade | Nana Patekar, Iravati Harshe, Sumeet Raghavan | |
| F E B | 16 | Gulabjaam | Sachin Kundalkar | Siddharth Chandekar, Sonali Kulkarni | |
| F E B | 23 | Rakshas | Dnyanesh Zoting | Sharad Kelkar, Sai Tamhankar | |
| F E B | 23 | Aamhi Doghi | Pratima Joshi | Mukta Barve, Priya Bapat, Bhushan Pradhan | |
| M A R | 2 | Bhay | Rahul Bhatankar | Abhijeet Khandkekar, Smita Gondkar | |
| M A R | 2 | Memory Card | Mitesh Chindarkar | Reeshabh Purohit, Apurva Paranjape, Vibhuti Kadam | |
| M A R | 23 | Baban | Bhaurao Karhade | Bhausaheb Shinde, Gayatri Jadhav | |
| M A R | 30 | Gavthi | Anand Kumar Konnar | Shrikant Patil, Yogita Chavan | |

== April–June ==
| Opening | Title | Director | Cast | Source |
|---|---|---|---|---|
| 6 April | Asehi Ekada Vhave | Sushrut Bhagwat | Umesh Kamat, Tejashree Pradhan, Chirag Patil | |
| 13 April | Mantr | Devendra Shinde | Saurabh Gogate, Deepti Devi, Manoj Joshi | |
| 20 April | Shikari | Viju Mane | Neha Khan, Bharat Ganeshpure | |
| 27 April | Nude | Ravi Jadhav | Chhaya Kadam, Madan Deodhar, Kalyanee Mulay | |
| 4 May | Cycle | Prakash Kunthe | Hrishikesh Joshi, Priyadarshan Jadhav, Bhalchandra Kadam | |
| 11 May | Lagna Mubarak | Sagar Pathak | Siddhant Mooley, Prarthana Behere | |
| 11 May | Ranangan | Rakesh Sarang | Swwapnil Joshi, Sachin Pilgaonkar | |
| 11 May | Mahasatta 2035 | Ramprabhu Nakate | Nagesh Bhosale, Bharat Ganeshpure, Usha Naik | |
| 18 May | Wagherya | Sameer Asha Patil | Hrishikesh Joshi, Bharat Ganeshpure, Chhaya Kadam, Kishor Kadam, Sambhaji Sasane | |
| 18 May | Redu | Sagar Chhaya Vanjari | Chhaya Kadam, Shashank Shende | |
| 25 May | Bucket List | Tejas Deoskar | Madhuri Dixit, Sumeet Raghvan | |
| 25 May | Sobat | Milind K. Ukly | Himanshu Visale, Monalisa Bagal | |
| 1 June | Maska | Priyadarshan Jadhav | Aniket Vishwasrao, Prarthana Behere, Shashank Shende, Chinmay Mandlekar | |
| 1 June | Farzand | Digpal Lanjekar | Prasad Oak, Ankit Mohan, Chinmay Mandlekar, Mrinal Kulkarni, Mrunmayee Deshpande, Neha Joshi, Ajay Purkar, | |
| 1 June | Bedhadak | Santosh Manjrekar | Akshay Waghmare, Ashok Samarth, Ganesh Yadav | |
| 8 June | Trushart | Arun Mavnoor | Jyoti Nivadunge, Mahesh Rajput, Amul Bute, Dilip Potnis, Vrinda Bal, Dr. Jadav, Nilangi Revankar, Yogita Chaudhary, Milisha Jadav, Akshay Vartak, Vinaya Dongre, Nishant Pathare, Chiatali Stut, Chandrakant Mitbawkar | |
| 8 June | Aa Bb Kk | Ramkumar Shegde | Tamannaah Bhatia, Suniel Shetty | |
| 22 June | Ziprya | Kedar Vaidya | Chinmay Kambli, Prathamesh Parab, Pravin Tarde, Amruta Subhash | |

== July – September ==
| Opening | Title | Director | Cast | Source |
|---|---|---|---|---|
| 6 July | Youngraad | Makarand Mane | Vitthal Patil, Chaitanya Dore | |
| 13 July | Dry Day | Pandurang Jadhav | Rutwik Kendre, Monalisa Bagal, Kailash Waghmare, Chinmay Kambli, Parth Ghadge | |
| 13 July | Lathe Joshi | | | |
| 24 August | Truckbhar Swapna | Pramod Pawar | Makarand Deshpande, Kranti Redkar, Aaditi Pohankar, Mukesh Rishi | |
| 31 August | Savita Damodar Paranjpe | Swapna Waghmare Joshi | Subodh Bhave, Trupti Toradmal, Pallavi Patil | |
| 7 September | Party | Sachin Darekar | Suvrat Joshi, Vedant Patil, Akshay Tanksale, Prajakta Mali, Stavan Shinde, Rohit Haldikar and Manjiri Pupala | |
| 7 September | Bogda | Nisheeta Keni | Suhas Joshi, Mrunmayee Deshpande | |

== October – December ==
| Opening | Title | Director | Cast | Source |
|---|---|---|---|---|
| 5 October | Boyz 2 | Vishal Devrukhkar | Sumant Shinde, Parth Bhalerao, Pratik Lad, Girish Kulkarni, Onkar Bhojane, Sayli Patil, Akshata Padgaonkar, Shubhangi Tambale, Soham Kalokhe, Pallavi Patil, Yatin Karyekar, Amitriyan Patil, Sharvari Jamenes | |
| 5 October | Namdev Bhau: In Search of Silence | Dar Gai | Namdev Gaurav | |
| 12 October | Shubh Lagna Savdhan | Sameer Ramesh Surve | Subodh Bhave, Shruti Marathe, Pratik Deshmukh, Rewati Limaye, Girish Oak, Vidyadhar Joshi, Kishore Pradhan, Nirmiti Sawant, Kishori Ambiye | |
| 18 October | Ek Sangaychay | Lokesh Gupte | Kay Kay Menon | |
| 18 October | Me Shivaji Park | Mahesh Manjrekar | Ashok Saraf, Vikram Gokhale, Shivaji Satam, Dilip Prabhavalkar, Satish Alekar | |
| 19 October | Tu Tithe Asave | Santosh Gaikwad | Bhushan Pradhan, Pallavi Patil, Vijay Patkar, Sameer Dharmadhikari, Arun Nalawade, Mohan Joshi, Jayavant Wadkar, Shrikant Vattamvar, Abhilasha Patil, Vishakha Dube, Master Tejas Patil | |
| 26 October | Patil | Santosh RamMeena | Shivaji Patil, Bhagyashree Mote, Narendra Deshmukh, SRM Alien, Yash Deshmukh, Pratima Deshpande, Suresh Pillay, Kapil Kamble, Dr. Jagdish Patil | |
| 26 October | Maza Agadbam | Trupti Bhoir | Trupti Bhoir, Subodh Bhave, Usha Nadkarni, Jaywant Wadekar, Tanaji Galgunde | |
| 8 November | Ani... Dr. Kashinath Ghanekar | Abhijeet Deshpande | Subodh Bhave, Vaidehi Parashurami, Sonali Kulkarni, Sumeet Raghavan, Nandita Dhuri | |
| 16 November | Gat-Mat | Nishith Shrivastava | Akshay Tanksale, Rasika Sunil, Nikhil Wairagar | |
| 16 November | Naal | Sudhakar Reddy Yakkanti | Shreenivas Pokale, Nagraj Manjule | |
| 23 November | Mulshi Pattern | Pravin Vithhal Tarade | Om Bhutkar, Mohan Joshi Mahesh Manjrekar Upendra Limaye Pravin Vithhal Tarade, Malvika Gaekwad, Savita Malpekar, Kshitish Date, Sunil Abhyaknar, Ramesh Pardeshi, Abhay Arun Gaekwad, Dipti Dhotre, Suresh Vishwakarma | |
| 23 November | Majhya Baikocha Priyakar | Rajiv S. Ruia | Aniket Vishwasrao, Priyadarshan Jadhav, Bhagyashree Mote, Anshuman Vichare, Priya Gamre, Bharat Ganeshpure, Anupama Takmoge. Swati Pansare, | |
| 14 November | Mauli | Aditya Sarpotdar | Riteish Deshmukh, Saiyami Kher, Jitendra Joshi, Girija Oak, Siddharth Jadhav | |
| 30 November | Madhuri | Swapna Waghmare Joshi | Sonali Kulkarni, Sharad Kelkar | |
| 7 December | Mumbai Pune Mumbai 3 | Satish Rajwade | Swwapnil Joshi, Mukta Barve | |
