= Vasant Joglekar =

Indian film director and producer

Vasant Joglekar (1914–1993) was a film director and producer. He directed several Marathi and Hindi movies, including Aanchal and Aaj Aur Kal.

== Career ==
=== Ha Khel Savalyancha ===
Vasant Joglekar is the director of Ha Khel Savalyancha (transl. This Game of Shadows), a 1976 Indian Marathi-language crime thriller (Note: In the book "Marathi Cinema: In Retrospect" by Sanjit Narvwekar, the film genre referred to is "suspense thriller," and in Indian Horror Cinema: (En)gendering the Monstrous book it referred as horror genre.) produced by Sumati Gupte-Joglekar and starring Asha Kale and Kashinath Ghanekar star in the lead roles. Ha Khel Savalyancha includes elements of horror and received critical and commercial acclaim at the time of his released; it is still considered a "superhit" of Marathi cinema. For that film, Hridaynath Mangeshkar won the Ganeshan Award in Best Music Director category and Manohar Aacharya for Best colour photography. The film was said to be "deeply rooted in the village life of Maharastra".

In the 2018 film Ani... Dr. Kashinath Ghanekar, starring Subodh Bhave as Kashinath Ghanekar and Prajakta Mali as Asha Kale, the iconic song "Gomu Sangatina" from the film was remade, bridging the rich legacy of Marathi theater with modern audiences.

== Selected filmography ==
=== Director only ===
- Janki (1979)
- Ha Khel Sawalyancha (1976)
- Prarthana (1969)
- Ek Kali Muskai (1968)
- Shevatcha Malusura (1965)
- Aaj Aur Kal (1963)
- Aanchal (1960)
- Karigar (1958)
- Samaj (1954)
- Firdaus (1953)
- Jeet Kiski (1952)
- Nand Kishore (1951), with Baburao Pendharkar
- Sakharpuda (1949)
- Adalat (1948)
- Aap Ki Sewa Mein (1947)
- Chimukla Sansar (1943)
- Kiti Hasaal (1942)

=== Director and producer ===
- Aanchal (1960)
- Aaj Aur Kal (1963)
