= Pranali Ghogare =

Indian actress

- Other name: Prranali
- Occupation: Actress
- Years active: 2014–present
- Known for: Mere Rang Mein Rangne Waali; Guddu Engineer; Ranangan

Pranali Ghogare is an Indian actress who primarily works in Hindi, Telugu and Tamil films and Hindi television. She made her acting debut in 2014 with Mere Rang Mein Rangne Waali portraying Radha Pathak Chaturvedi. She made her Hindi film debut with Nikhil Advani's Short film Guddu Engineer in 2016.

In 2018, Ghogare made her Marathi film debut with Ranangan and Telugu film debut with Manchukurisevelalo.

== Career ==
Ghogare made her acting debut with Mere Rang Mein Rangne Waali portraying Radha Pathak Chaturvedi opposite Samridh Bawa from 2014 to 2015.

She made her film debut in 2016 with the Hindi short film Guddu Engineer, portraying Sonia opposite Prabuddh Dyma. It proved as a major turning point in her career.

In 2018, Ghogare made her Marathi film debut with Ranangan portraying Sanika Deshmukh opposite Siddharth Chandekar. It received mixed to positive reviews from critics. The same year, she portrayed Durdhara opposite Kartikey Malviya in Chandragupta Maurya.

She made her Telugu film debut in 2018, with Manchukurisevelalo portraying Geetha opposite Ram Karthik. The film received mostly mixed reviews.

Ghogare portrayed Poorva Mishra Tripathi in Rajaa Betaa opposite Dishank Arora in 2019. The same year, she portrayed Risha in the Hindi film Fastey Fasaatey opposite Nachiket Narvekar. It received mostly negative reviews.

In 2022, she portrayed Meena in Human, marking her web debut. It received positive reviews from critics.

In 2025, Pranali Ghogare featured in the Marathi music video Daina Zaliya, alongside singer-songwriter Vaibhav Londhe, who also wrote, composed, and performed the song.

== Filmography ==
=== Films ===
Key
†	Denotes films that have not yet been released

Year	Title	Role	Language	Notes	Ref.
2016	Guddu Engineer	Sonia	Hindi	Short film	
2018	Ranangan	Sanika Varad Deshmukh	Marathi		
2018	Manchukurisevelalo	Geetha	Telugu		
2019	Fastey Fasaatey	Risha	Hindi		
2023	Ariyavan	Jessie	Tamil	credited as Prranali	
2023	The Kerala Story	Shaziya	Hindi		

=== Television ===
Year	Title	Role	Notes	Ref.
2014-2015	Mere Rang Mein Rangne Waali	Radha Pathak Chaturvedi		
2018	Chandragupta Maurya	Young Durdhara		
2019	Rajaa Betaa	Poorva Mishra Tripathi		

=== Web series ===
Year	Title	Role	Notes	Ref.
2022	Human	Meena		

=== Music Videos ===
Year	Title	Language	Notes	Ref.
2025	Daina Zaliya	Marathi		
2025	Ranjha Tera Heeriye	Hindi		

== See also ==
- List of Indian television actresses
