= Vishnupant =

Vishnupant is a given name. People with the name include:

- Vishnupant Govind Damle
- Vishnupant Moreshwar Chatre

== See also ==
- Vishnupant Damle (film)
