= Devmanus (film) =

2025 Indian Marathi language film

- Theatrical release poster
- Directed by: Tejas Prabha Vijay Deoskar
- Written by: Neha Shitole
- Produced by: Luv Ranjan; Ankur Garg
- Starring: Mahesh Manjrekar; Renuka Shahane; Subodh Bhave; Siddharth Bodke
- Cinematography: Amey Vasant Chavan
- Edited by: Faisal Mahadik
- Music by: Advait Nemlekar; Rohan-Rohan
- Production company: Luv Films
- Distributed by: PVR Inox Pictures
- Release date: 25 April 2025
- Running time: 129 minutes
- Country: India
- Language: Marathi

Devmanus (transl. God-like person or God figure) is a 2025 Indian Marathi language drama film directed by Tejas Prabha Vijay Deoskar and produced by Luv Ranjan and Ankur Garg under Luv Films. Starring Mahesh Manjrekar, Renuka Shahane, Subodh Bhave, and Siddharth Bodke, the film is an adaptation of Jaspal Singh Sandhu and Rajeev Barnwal's 2022 Hindi film Vadh, also produced by Luv Films. It follows a saintly man whose life takes a dramatic turn after a pivotal act, forcing him to navigate a moral dilemma between repentance and atonement. Devmanus was released in theatres on 25 April 2025.

== Cast ==
- Mahesh Manjrekar as Keshav
- Renuka Shahane as Laxmi, Keshav's wife
- Subodh Bhave as Inspector Ravi Deshmukh
- Siddharth Bodke as Dilip
- Abhijeet Khandkekar as Vilas Jedhe
- Avni Tamhane as Rama
- Ruturaj Shinde as Madhav
- Pournima Dey as Jedhe's wife
- Gayatri Bansode as Dilip's wife
- Anshuman Joshi as Hawaldar
- Vinod Vanve as Auto Rickshaw driver
- Mohan Agashe in a special appearance as an Unknown Varkari
- Sai Tamhankar in a special appearance as dancer in the song ''Aalech Mi''

== Production ==
Devmanus marks the debut of Luv Films in Marathi cinema. It is an adaptation of the 2022 Hindi-language film Vadh, also produced by Luv Films, starring Sanjay Mishra and Neena Gupta.

In December 2024, it was announced that veteran actors Mahesh Manjrekar and Renuka Shahane would star together for the first time, with filming completed in Phaltan, Maharashtra. The film marks Shahane's return to Marathi cinema since her 2018 film Bucket List, also directed by Pravin Deoskar. Subodh Bhave was cast in a significant role, as revealed in January 2025.

The film features Sai Tamhankar's debut Lavani performance, choreographed by Ashish Patil, for the song "Aalech Mi Lavani". Tamhankar rehearsed for 33 hours to prepare for the dance sequence. Additionally, actress Neha Shitole debuted as a writer, contributing the dialogues and screenplay.

== Release and marketing ==
=== Release ===
Devmanus was scheduled for release on 25 April 2025, with the date announced on 15 January 2025. Director Pravin Deoskar's Hindi action thriller Ground Zero was also released on the same day.

=== Marketing ===
On 11 February 2025, the first look of the main cast was released, generating significant interest among audiences. The teaser, showcasing Mahesh Manjrekar as a Warkari, was unveiled on 13 February 2025 and screened alongside the Bollywood film Chhaava in theatres. The promotional campaign included the release of the devotional song "Panduranga," featuring Manjrekar, on 2 April 2025. A Lavani song, "Alech Mi Lavani," featuring Sai Tamhankar, was released on 15 April 2025. The trailer was launched at an event in Mumbai on 8 April 2025, attended by the cast and crew. On 21 April 2025, the song "Sobati," featuring the lead pair and sung by Shekhar Ravjiani and Aarya Ambekar, was released.

== Reception ==
=== Critical response ===
The Marathi film Devmanus received mixed to positive reviews from critics, with praise for its performances and direction, though some noted shortcomings in its narrative execution. Santosh Bhingarde of Sakal described the film as a compelling remake, highlighting Mahesh Manjrekar and Renuka Shahane's chemistry and the film's emotional depth, though he noted pacing issues in the second half. Reshma Raikwar, writing for Loksatta, appreciated director Tejas Prabha Vijay Deuskar's sensitive handling of the subject matter and the lead pair's nuanced performances, but felt the screenplay could have been tighter. Kalpesh Kubal from Maharashtra Times lauded the film's attempt to balance drama and social commentary, commending Manjrekar's intensity, though he criticized certain predictable plot points. Deepa Gehlot of Scroll.in called it a "respectable remake" with a well-matched lead pair, emphasizing Shahane's understated performance but pointing out that the film lacked the original's sharpness. Mihir Bhanage from The Times of India gave a positive review, praising the film's engaging narrative and strong acting, particularly Manjrekar's commanding presence, but noted that some emotional beats felt repetitive. He wrote "What makes Devmanus a good watch is the way the film unfolds. While the crux remains the same as Vadh, the setting changes, as do a few scenes. The casting of Devmanus is worth applauding. Every actor is immensely talented, but it’s the story that’s the star here".

=== Accolades ===
Awards	Year	Category	Recipient	Result	Ref
Zee 24 Taas Marathi Sanman	2025	Best Villain	Abhijeet Khandkekar	Won	
MaTa Sanman	2026	Best Actor	Mahesh Manjrekar	Nominated	
MaTa Sanman	2026	Best Supporting Actor	Siddharth Bodke	Won	
City Cine Awards Marathi	2026	Best Supporting Actor – Male	Siddharth Bodke	Pending	
Filmfare Awards Marathi	2026	Best Film Critic	Tejas Prabha Vijay Deoskar	Pending	
Filmfare Awards Marathi	2026	Best Actor	Mahesh Manjrekar	Pending	
Filmfare Awards Marathi	2026	Best Actress	Renuka Shahane	Pending	
