= Naktichya Lagnala Yaycha Ha =

2017 Indian Marathi-language TV series

- Genre: Comedy; Drama
- Starring: See below
- Country of origin: India
- Original language: Marathi
- No. of episodes: 156

Production
- Producers: Aparna Ketkar; Atul Ketkar
- Production locations: Mumbai, Maharashtra
- Camera setup: Multi-camera
- Running time: 22 minutes
- Production company: Right Click Media Solutions

Original release
- Network: Zee Marathi
- Release: 17 January – 4 November 2017

Naktichya Lagnala Yaycha Ha (transl. Come to Nakti's wedding) is an Indian Marathi language TV series which aired on Zee Marathi. It starred Prajakta Mali and Abhijit Amkar in lead roles.

== Plot ==
Nupur (Nakti), a young woman at the marriageable age, initially resists the idea of matrimony under family pressure. However, gradually, she finds herself opening up to the prospect. As preparations for her wedding commence without a chosen groom, her family embarks on a search for a suitable match. Nakti encounters 23 prospective suitors, with each meeting resulting in either her rejection or theirs.

Enter Shree Ketkar, a familiar face from a previous meeting, reemerging in Nakti's life. Over time, a mutual understanding blossoms, and feelings between them deepen. After a few days, they gather the courage to express their emotions to each other. Subsequently, discussions with their respective families lead to the acceptance of their union.

Navigating through various challenges and chaos, Nakti and Shree Ketkar eventually tie the knot, culminating in a union that overcame the complexities of the matchmaking process.

== Cast ==
=== Main ===
- Prajakta Mali as Nupur Suryakant Deshpande
- Abhijit Amkar as Neeraj Jayant Divate

=== Recurring ===
- Shashank Ketkar as Shree Ketkar
- Pournima Talwalkar as Vijaya Suryakant Deshpande
- Sanjay Kulkarni as Suryakant Deshpande
- Varsha Dandale as Lata Chandrakant Deshpande
- Asit Redij / Atul Todankar as Chandrakant Deshpande
- Abhinay Sawant as Yash Chandrakant Deshpande
- Ragini Samant as Aaisaheb
- Shakuntala Nare as Baisaheb
- Ananda Karekar as Jayant Divate
- Sonali Pandit as Shailaja Jayant Divate

=== Guest appearances ===
- Aniket Vishwasrao
- Prasad Oak
- Swapnil Joshi
- Avadhoot Gupte
- Siddharth Chandekar
- Bharat Jadhav
- Siddharth Menon
- Vaibhav Mangle
- Subodh Bhave
- Hrishikesh Joshi
- Gashmeer Mahajani
- Nilesh Sabale
- Lalit Prabhakar
- Sushant Shelar
- Sandeep Pathak
- Sagar Karande
- Anand Ingale
- Milind Shinde
- Prashant Damle
- Bhalchandra Kadam
- Uday Tikekar
- Mohan Joshi
- Kavita Lad
- Shilpa Tulaskar
- Nirmiti Sawant
- Kranti Redkar
- Seema Deshmukh
- Mugdha Godbole
- Radhika Harshe
