= Rohan-Rohan =

Indian music director duo of Hindi and Marathi films

Rohan Rohan
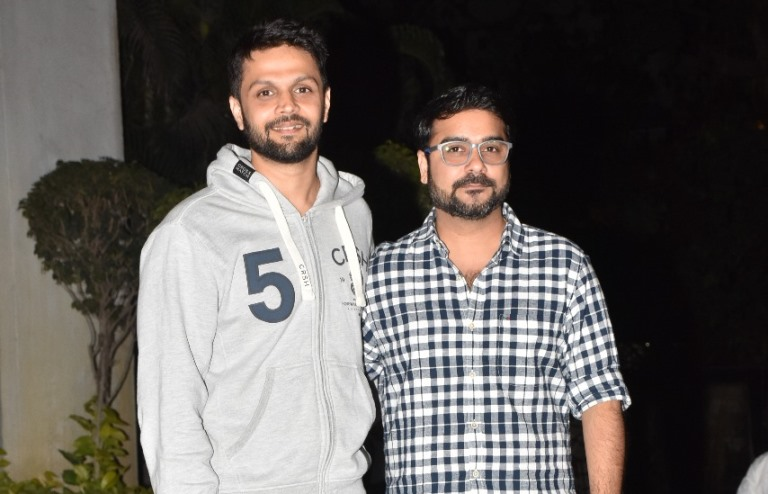
- Rohan and Rohan at Thackeray Premier

Background information
- Origin: Mumbai, India
- Genres: Pop, Indian film music, rock, electronic dance music, original film score
- Occupations: Singer–songwriters, music composer, lyricist, musicians, music production
- Instruments: Piano, keyboards, guitars
- Years active: 2014–present
- Labels: Zee Music Company, Universal Music India, T-Series
- Members: Rohan Pradhan, Rohan Gokhale

Rohan Rohan is an Indian music director duo of Hindi and Marathi films, various television series, ad films and web series. The duo consists of Rohan Praddhan and Rohan Gokhale and is known for their work in Marathi and Hindi films including Ventilator, Sanju, Bucket List and Thackeray among many others.

== Early life ==
Rohan Pradhan hails from Mumbai. He started his music journey at a very early age, singing and learning piano. Before joining hands with Rohan Gokhale, he worked as an independent composer and singer for many Marathi films.

Rohan Gokhale was born and grew up in Nagpur. He is an engineer. Gokhale and Pradhan teamed up in 2014 to form Rohan Rohan.

The Duo is co-producers of Marathi film 'Bardo' which won two National Awards, in Best film and Best Female Singer categories for their song 'Raan Petla'.

== Filmography ==
=== Films ===
Year	Film	Language
2014	Mumbai Delhi Mumbai	Hindi
2015	Shinma	Marathi
2016	Barad	Marathi
2016	Kaul Manacha	Marathi
2016	Photocopy	Marathi
2016	Ventilator	Marathi
2017	Thank You Vitthala	Marathi
2017	Kaay Re Rascalaa	Marathi
2018	Sanju	Hindi
2018	Cycle	Marathi
2018	Bucket List	Marathi
2018	Jaga Vegli Antayatra	Marathi
2018	Dostigiri	Marathi
2018	Ani... Dr. Kashinath Ghanekar	Marathi
2019	Thackeray	Hindi
2019	Kissebaaz	Hindi
2019	Smile Please	Marathi
2019	Baba	Marathi
2019	Bypass Road	Hindi
2019	Copy	Marathi
2019	15 August	Marathi
2020	Bonus	Marathi
2020	Vijeta	Marathi
2021	Well Done Baby	Marathi
2021	Pirem	Marathi
2022	Zombivli	Marathi
2022	Sumi	Marathi
2023	Chhatriwali	Hindi
2023	Haddi	Hindi
2023	Ekda Yeun Tar Bagha	Marathi
2023	Baap Manus	Marathi
2024	Musafiraa	Marathi
2025	ChikiChiki BooBoomBoom	Marathi
2025	Hardik Shubhechha	Marathi
2025	Ground Zero	Hindi
2025	Phule	Hindi
2025	Devmanus	Marathi
2025	April May 99	Marathi
2026	Tula Pahata	Marathi
2026	Manjar	Marathi

=== TV series ===
Year	TV series Title Song	Channel	Language
2014	Chala Hawa Yeu Dya	Zee Marathi	Marathi
2014	Sakhi	Colors Marathi	Marathi
2016	Anjali	Zee Yuva	Marathi
2016	Aawaz	Colors Marathi	Marathi
2016	Radha Prem Rangi Rangli	Colors Marathi	Marathi
2018	Bigg Boss Marathi	Colors Marathi	Marathi
2018	Sukhachya Sarini He Man Baware	Colors Marathi	Marathi
2018	Jaago Mohan Pyare	Zee Marathi	Marathi
2019	Raja Ranichi Ga Jodi	Colors Marathi	Marathi
2020	Sahkutumb Sahparivar	Star Pravah	Marathi
2021	Swabhiman – Shodh Astitvacha	Star Pravah	Marathi
2021	Tujhya Rupacha Chandana	Colors Marathi	Marathi

=== Web series and films ===
Title	Platform	Language
Intruder	Hotstar	Hindi
Thoda Adjust Please	Eros Now/Apple TV	Hindi
Wrong Number	RVCJ Media	Hindi
Hutatma	Zee5	Hindi
TVF Sixer	Amazon Mini	Hindi
Hostel Daze	Amazon Prime	Hindi
Permanent Roommates	Amazon Prime	Hindi
Humorously Yours	Zee5	Hindi
Space Gen: Chandrayaan	JioHotstar	Hindi
