= Daadi Maa =

- Poster
- Directed by: L. V. Prasad
- Screenplay by: Pandit Mukhram Sharma
- Story by: Pini Shetty
- Produced by: L. V. Prasad
- Starring: Ashok Kumar; Bina Rai; Durga Khote; Shashikala; Mehmood Ali; Rehman; Chand Usmani; Kashinath Ghanekar; Mumtaz; Tanuja; David Abraham; Kanhaiyalal
- Cinematography: Dwarka Divecha
- Edited by: Shivaji Avdhut
- Music by: Roshan
- Production company: Prasad Productions
- Release date: 1966
- Running time: 171 minutes
- Country: India
- Language: Hindi

Daadi Maa (transl. Grandmother) is a 1966 Indian Hindi-language drama film directed by L. V. Prasad and starring Ashok Kumar, Bina Rai, Mumtaz, Tanuja and Durga Khote.

== Plot ==
Parvati (Bina Rai) hopes to repair the relationship between her husband Raja Pratap Rai (Ashok Kumar) and his stepmother. So she takes in her sister-in-law's baby as her own, while the true heir gets raised up in the status of a servant. Will this secret be found out and what will happen?

== Cast ==
- Durga Khote as Daadi Maa / Rajmata (Queen Mother)
- Ashok Kumar as Raja Pratap Rai, her step-son
- Bina Rai as Rani Maa Parvati Devi, wife of Raja Pratap Rai
- Shashikala as Ganga, sister of Raja Pratap Rai
- Mehmood as Mahesh, husband of Ganga
- Rehman as Dr. Bharati, brother of Rani Maa Parvati Devi
- Chand Usmani as Dr. Bharati's wife; she is a former nurse from a family background deemed lowly by the Raja
- Purnima as Bahurani, the widowed daughter-in-law of Rajmata and the actual mother of Shankar (Uncredited role)
- Dilip Raj as Shankar, actually the son of Bahurani but raised by Raja Pratap Rai and Rani Parvati Devi as their son
- Kashinath Ghanekar as Somu, actual son of Raja Pratap Rai and Rani Parvati Devi
- Mumtaz as Seema
- Tanuja as Saguna
- David as Balram
- Kanhaiyalal as Totaram, a courtier of the Raja
- Jankidas as Pandit Gyandutt, a courtier of the Raja
- Mukri in a role as a courtier of the Raja

== Songs ==
Song title	Singer(s)	Raga
"Usko Nahin Dekha Hamne Kabhi ..."	Manna Dey, Mahendra Kapoor	Pahadi
"Jata Hoon Main Mujhe Ab Na Bulana ..."	Mohammed Rafi	
"Ai Maa Teri Surat Se ..."	Manna Dey, Mahendra Kapoor	
"Chale Aaye Re Hum ..."	Lata Mangeshkar	
"Maine Aur Kya Kiya ..."	Asha Bhosle	
"Suraj Soya Soye Ujale ..."	Lata Mangeshkar	
"Sant Log Farmay Gaye ..."	Manna Dey, Pooran	
"Jaane Na Dunga Na Jaane Dunga"	Asha Bhosle, Manna Dey	

== Reception ==
In a typically negative review, K. Shankar Pillai, in a column for the magazine Shankar's Weekly, wrote of Daadi Maa in 1966, "Whatever else our faults as a nation, none shall ever blame us for letting down Indian motherhood... Bina Rai is the Mom with the halo, married to Ashok Kumar who is quick to scowl, yell and shoot at people. He is no lover here; he is a Rajah entitled to the said tantrums. He even stands for elections, which is quite understandable since Rajahs are elected or nominated nowadays. He is opposed by a commoner backed by Durga Khote, who is the stepmother of Ashok Kumar... Brother-in-law Rehman is an ardent believer in socialism and looks as though he has swallowed Avadi and all that hook, line and sinker (note: reference is to the 1955 session of the INC at Avadi, where socialism was famously adopted as the ruling party's policy) .... Mehmood appears often, trying hard to raise a laugh or two. He is the only relieving feature, although he too contributes his share of hamming ... Kumar is getting more rotund and even he is obviously fed up with Indian cinema, whatever film journals might say".
