= Hampi (film) =

- Film poster
- Directed by: Prakash Kunte
- Screenplay by: Aditi Moghe
- Produced by: Yogesh Bhalerao, Sujeet Gaikwad
- Starring: Lalit Prabhakar; Sonalee Kulkarni; Prajakta Mali
- Cinematography: Amalendu Chaudhary
- Music by: Narendra Bhide; Aditya Bedekar
- Production company: Zee Studios
- Release date: 17 November 2017 (India)
- Running time: 136 minutes
- Country: India
- Language: Marathi

Hampi is a 2017 Indian Marathi language film directed by Prakash Kunte, starring Sonalee Kulkarni, Lalit Prabhakar, Prajakta Mali, Priyadarshan Jadhav, Vijay Nikam and Chhaya Kadam.

== Plot ==
Isha is hurt by her parents' divorce. So she hates people and does not believe in love. She visits Hampi in Karnataka, in search of happiness. She meets many people, including Kabir who helps her find happiness in the little things. They become friends and after some time she falls in love with him. One day, Kabir disappears suddenly without informing anyone. In the end, Isha realises the value of people and true love.

== Cast ==
- Sonalee Kulkarni as Isha, a girl who is depressed due to her parents' divorce
- Lalit Prabhakar as Kabir, a young bachelor in the neighborhood of Isha's hotel room
- Prajakta Mali as Girija, a fun-loving girl, friend of Isha
- Priyadarshan Jadhav as Ranjeet, an auto rickshaw driver and tourist guide
- Vijay Nikam as Shankar, a Sadhu
- Chhaya Kadam as Ashabai, a handicraft items seller
- Ruturaaj Shinde as Raj
- Sayali Rathod as Lamani Bai's daughter-in-law

== Production ==
The film is set against Hampi's backdrop.

== Release ==
The film was released on 17 November 2017. It was later released on streaming platform ZEE5.

== Reception ==
=== Box office ===
At the box office, Hampi grossed over approximately ₹12 crore (US$1.2 million).

=== Critical reception ===
Mihir Bhanage of The Times of India rated the film 3 out of 5 stars. He praised the cinematography, philosophy and performances but criticised the story. Blessy Chettiar of Cinestaan described the film as a genuine attempt of story, screenplay and dialogue writer Aditi Moghe. Ulhas Shirke of MarathiMovieWorld rated it 3.5/5, praising the cinematography and theme. The Maharashtra Times rated it 3/5. Ganesh Matkari writing for the Pune Mirror rated it 2.5 out of 5, praised its production design and criticised its lack of story placing it between romantic comedy and travel film. Film journalist Amol Parchure praised the cinematography and music and criticised the lack of depth in some characters. He rated it 2.5/5.
