= Tejas Prabha Vijay Deoskar =

Indian film director (born 1983)

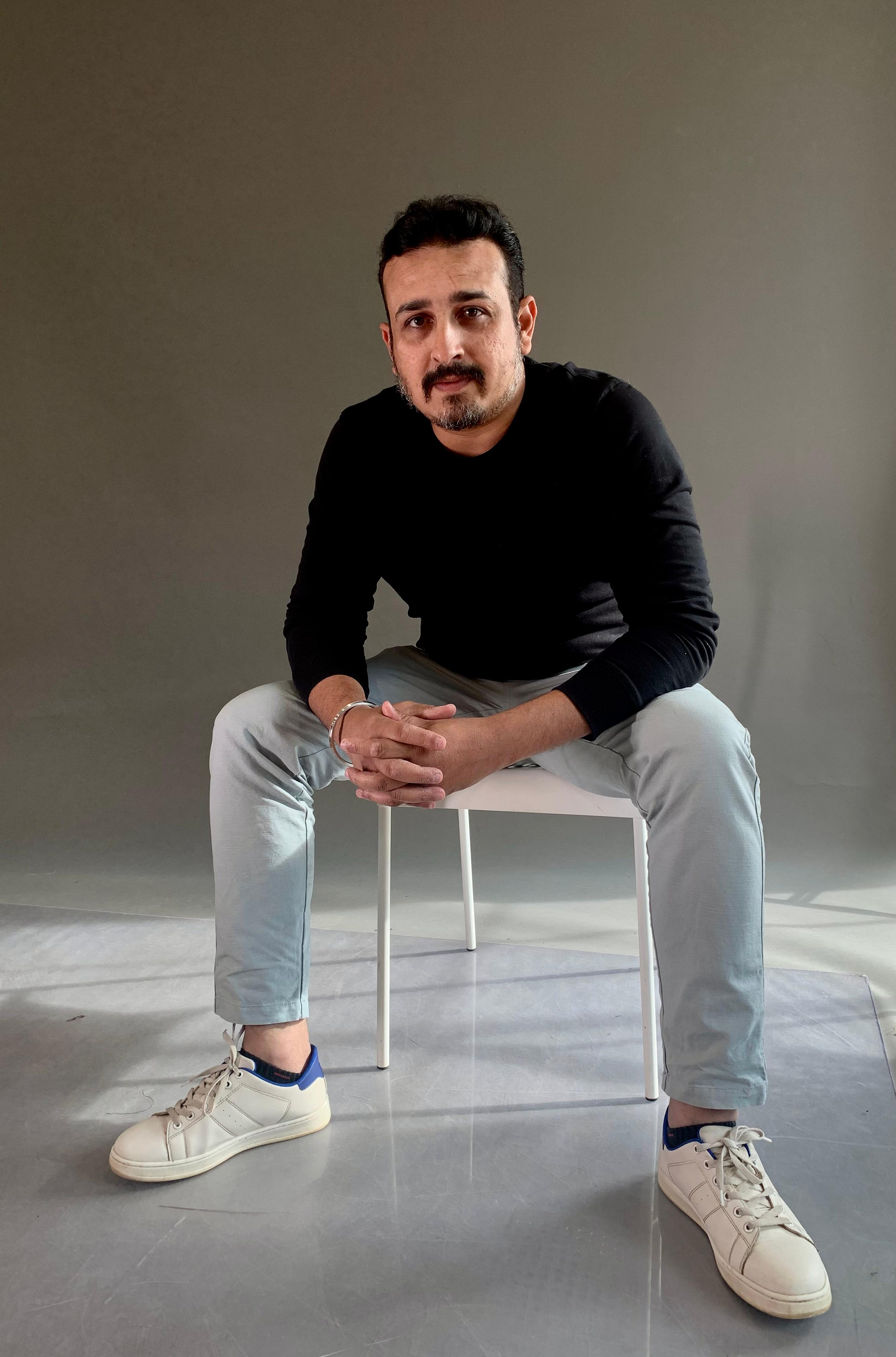
- Born: May 14, 1983 (age 42); Nagpur, Maharashtra, India
- Occupations: Film director; screenwriter

Tejas Prabha Vijay Deoskar (born 14 May 1983) is an Indian film director and screenwriter working in Marathi and Hindi cinema. He is best known for directing Madhuri Dixit's Marathi debut film Bucket List (2018), and the Hindi film Chhatriwali (2023).

== Filmography ==
Key
†	Denotes film or TV productions that have not yet been released

Year	Film	Director	Writer	Lyricist	Language	Notes	Ref.
2013	Premsutra	Yes	Yes	No	Marathi	Debut	
2018	Bucket List	Yes	Yes	Yes	Marathi		
2023	Chhatriwali	Yes	No	No	Hindi		
2025	Ground Zero	Yes	No	No	Hindi		
2025	Devmanus	Yes	No	Yes	Marathi		
