= Me Honar Superstar – Chhote Ustad =

2021 Indian Marathi-language singing show

- Presented by: See here
- Judges: See below
- Country of origin: India
- Original language: Marathi
- No. of seasons: 4
- No. of episodes: 150

Production
- Production locations: Mumbai, Maharashtra
- Camera setup: Multi-camera
- Running time: 45 minutes
- Production company: Frames Production

Original release
- Network: Star Pravah
- Release: 4 December 2021 – 3 May 2026

Me Honar Superstar – Chhote Ustad (transl. I Will Be a Superstar – Little Masters) is an Indian Marathi language TV reality singing show which is a part of Mi Honar Superstar. The show aired 4 seasons of singing genre specially for juniors which aired on Star Pravah.

== Host ==
- Siddharth Chandekar
- Vaidehi Parshurami

== Judges ==
- Sachin Pilgaonkar
- Vaishali Samant
- Adarsh Shinde

== Seasons ==
Season	Originally broadcast	
Season	First aired	Last aired
1	4 December 2021	8 May 2022
2	10 June 2023	8 October 2023
3	13 July 2024	10 November 2024
4	3 January 2026	3 May 2026
