= Amalendu Chaudhary =

Indian cinematographer

- Born: India
- Occupation: Cinematographer
- Years active: 2000s–present
- Known for: Chhichhore, Stree, OMG 2, Fukrey 3
- Awards: Maharashtra State Award, Filmfare Award

Amalendu Chaudhary is an Indian cinematographer known for his work in Hindi and Marathi cinema. He is known for his works in The Sabarmati Report, Ae Watan Mere Watan, Fukrey 3 and OMG 2.

== Career ==
Amalendu Chaudhary is known for his work in Harishchandrachi Factory (2009), which was chosen as India’s official entry for the Oscars in 2010.

In 2018, he received the Filmfare Award and Maharashtra State Film Award for his work in Hampi (2017) and Cycle (2018), respectively.

== Filmography ==
Year	Film	Language	Notes	Ref.
2004	Shubra Kaahi	Marathi	Short film	
2007	Dohaa	Marathi		
2009	Bokya Satbande	Marathi		
2009	Harishchandrachi Factory	Marathi		
2009	Gandha	Marathi		
2010	Jhing Chik Jhing	Marathi		
2011	Hello Jai Hind!	Marathi		
2012	Aiyyaa	Hindi		
2013	Chintoo 2: Khajinyachi Chittarkatha	Marathi		
2013	Prem Mhanje Prem Mhanje Prem Asta	Marathi		
2013	Tendulkar Out	Marathi		
2014	Youngistaan	Hindi		
2014	The Shaukeens	Hindi		
2016	Tere Bin Laden: Dead or Alive	Hindi		
2016	The Kill	Marathi		
2016	That Pair	Marathi	Short film	
2017	Kachcha Limboo	Marathi		
2017	Hampi	Marathi		
2018	Baa Baaa Black Sheep	Hindi		
2018	Nude	Marathi		
2018	Cycle	Marathi		
2018	Saheb Biwi Aur Gangster 3	Hindi		
2018	Stree	Hindi		
2018	Mauli	Marathi		
2018	State vs. Malti Mhaske	Marathi		
2019	Chhichhore	Hindi		
2020	Darbaan	Hindi		
2021	Roohi	Hindi		
2021	Shiddat	Hindi		
2021	Hum Do Hamare Do	Hindi		
2023	OMG 2	Hindi		
2023	Fukrey 3	Hindi		
2024	Ae Watan Mere Watan	Hindi		
2024	The Sabarmati Report	Hindi		
2025	Gondhal	Marathi		

== Accolades ==
- Filmfare Award – Hampi, Cycle (2018)
- National Award for Best Hindi Film – Chhichhore (2019)
