= Teen Adkun Sitaram =

- Theatrical release poster
- Directed by: Hrishikesh Joshi
- Written by: Hrishikesh Joshi; Tejas Ranade
- Produced by: Lalasaheb Shinde; Rajendra Shinde; Nitin Vaidya
- Starring: Prajakta Mali; Vaibhav Tatwawadi; Hrishikesh Joshi; Alok Rajwade
- Cinematography: Amol Salunke
- Edited by: Guru Patil; Mahesh Kullekar
- Music by: Agnel Roman; Kaushal Inamdar
- Production companies: Supreme Motion Pictures; Nitin Vaidya Productions
- Release date: 29 September 2023
- Country: India
- Language: Marathi

Teen Adkun Sitaram (Note: In an interview to Zee 24 Taas, Joshi said, "Teen Adkun Sitaram" is a popular proverb or phrase used for a person who is stuck in a strange interesting situation in western Maharashtra.) is a 2023 Indian Marathi-language comedy-drama film written and directed by Hrishikesh Joshi, featuring Vaibhav Tatwawadi, Prajakta Mali, Alok Rajwade, Sankarshan Karhade. The film is produced by Supreme Motion Pictures and Nitin Vaidya Productions. It was theatrically released on 29 September 2023.

== Plot ==
Ajinkya, Kautilya, and Pushkar are highly rash and cunning. Before their fathers gave them the order to go into hiding because of their carelessness, life looked to be going really smoothly for them.

== Cast ==
- Vaibhav Tatwawadi as Pushkar
- Prajaktta Mali as Reva
- Sankarshan Karhade as Ajinkya
- Alok Rajwade as Kautilya
- Hrishikesh Joshi as Picasso
- Jitendra Rai as Gurubaksh

== Production ==
The film was officially announced in August 2023 via poster. Teaser was released on 6 September 2023.

== Release ==
Teen Adkun Sitaram was theatrically released on 29 September 2023.

== Reception ==
Film Information wrote that the film is too ordinary to make a mark at the box-office in spite of good comedy. Chandrasekhar Nene of Tarun Bharat says: "The film is invention of the youth of today's India."
