= Idhaya Kamalam =

1965 film by Srikanth

- Theatrical release poster
- Directed by: Srikanth
- Screenplay by: Aaroor Dass
- Based on: Pathlaag by Jayant Dehle
- Produced by: L. V. Prasad
- Starring: K. R. Vijaya; Ravichandran
- Cinematography: K. S. Prasad
- Edited by: P. V. Manickam
- Music by: K. V. Mahadevan
- Production company: Prasad Productions
- Distributed by: Prasad Productions
- Release date: 27 August 1965
- Country: India
- Language: Tamil

Idhaya Kamalam (transl. Lotus of the Heart) is a 1965 Indian Tamil-language thriller film, directed by Srikanth, written by Aaroor Dass and produced by L. V. Prasad. A remake of the 1964 Marathi film Pathlaag, it stars K. R. Vijaya and Ravichandran. The film was released on 27 August 1965 and became a box-office success.

== Plot ==
Kamala and Vimala are twin sisters. While Kamala leads a normal life and is married to a lawyer studying in London, Vimala joins a band of robbers. Kamala's husband returns home to find his wife terminally ill.

== Cast ==
Female cast

- K. R. Vijaya as Kamala and Vimala
- Sheeladevi as Geetha
- R. Rukmani as Bhaskar's mother

Male cast

- Ravichandran as Bhaskar
- T. S. Balaiah as Bhaskar's uncle
- S. V. Sahasranamam as the judge
- R. S. Manohar as the public prosecutor
- Balaji as the police inspector

== Production ==
Idhaya Kamalam, a remake of the Marathi film Pathlaag (1964), was directed by Srikanth and produced by L. V. Prasad under Prasad Productions. The screenplay was written by Aaroor Dass, cinematography was handled by K. S. Prasad, editing by P. V. Manickam and art direction by Thota. L. V. Prasad also served as supervising director. The film was colourised using Eastmancolor.

== Soundtrack ==
The soundtrack album was composed by K. V. Mahadevan while the lyrics were written by Kannadasan. Ustad Ahmad Hussain Khan, a member of Mahadevan's musical troupe, played the sitar for the songs "Ennathaan Ragasiyamo Idhayathile" and "Malargal Nanaindhana".

Track listing
No.	Title	Singer(s)	Length
1.	"Unnai Kaanaadha"	P. Susheela	03:26
2.	"Malargal Nanaindhana"	P. Susheela	03:57
3.	"Thol Kandaen"	P. B. Sreenivas, P. Susheela	04:24
4.	"Nee Pogum Idamellam"	P. B. Sreenivas, P. Susheela	04:38
5.	"Melathai Mella Thattu Mama"	S. Janaki	04:35
6.	"Ennathaan Ragasiyamo Idhayathile"	P. Susheela	04:39
7.	"Title Music" (Instrumental)	—	02:14
Total length:			27:53

== Release and reception ==
Idhaya Kamalam was released on 27 August 1965, and distributed by Prasad Productions in Madras. T. M. Ramachandran of Sport and Pastime called it a "noteworthy film", appreciating K. R. Vijaya and saying she gives "The best performance in the film [..] she displays mark her out as a fine actress". Ramachandran also praised K. V. Mahadevan's music, calling it "lilting" and "one of the important assets of the film" and also calling K. S. Prasad's camerawork "praiseworthy". Kalki lauded Prasad's cinematography, Vijaya's dual performance and Srikanth's direction, but felt Ravichandran did not do well enough. The film was a major success; according to historian Randor Guy, this was because of the music and Vijaya's performance.
