= Ranangan =

2018 Indian Marathi-language political drama film

- Directed by: Rakesh Sarang
- Starring: Sachin Pilgaonkar; Swapnil Joshi; Siddharth Chandekar; Suchitra Bandekar
- Cinematography: Prasad Bhende
- Edited by: Dharmesh Patel
- Music by: Amar Mohile
- Release date: 11 May 2018
- Country: India
- Language: Marathi

Ranangan (transl. Battlefield) is a 2018 Indian Marathi-language political drama film written and directed by Rakesh Sarang and produced by Vaibhav Uttamrao Joshi. The film stars Sachin Pilgaonkar, Swapnil Joshi, Siddharth Chandekar, Suchitra Bandekar and Pranali Ghogare. Amar Mohile composed the music with cinematography by Prasad Bhende. It was theatrically released on 11 May 2018.

== Plot ==
The film begins with a young woman named Priya (Prarthana Behere), dressed in bridal attire, following the sound of a flute to a fort at night. There, she encounters Sagar (Swapnil Joshi), who is playing the instrument. Priya confesses her love for him and reveals that she left her wedding to be with him. Although Sagar initially appears pleased, he confronts her for aborting their child. Priya explains that she did so to begin a new life with him. Upon hearing this, Sagar reveals that he has no other choice and pushes her off a cliff, causing her death. Later, while returning by train, a man tells Sagar that he witnessed what Sagar did, leaving him shocked.

The story then shifts to the household of Dr. Shyamrao Deshmukh (Sachin Pilgaonkar), a former principal-turned-politician who runs an educational trust and a university in Pune. Shyamrao lives with his wife Kalindi (Suchitra Bandekar) and their son Varad (Siddharth Chandekar), who has had two failed marriages due to impotence. Shyamrao is an arrogant and ambitious politician seeking a ticket to the Rajya Sabha, and he often belittles his brother-in-law Anna (Anand Ingale). Shyamrao's elderly aunt Aatya (Shital Shukla) is aware of his misdeeds and despises him.

One day, Shyamrao visits his spiritual leader, Guruji (Madhav Abhyankar), accompanied by Varad. At Guruji's residence, Varad meets Sanika (Pranali Ghogare), who is later revealed to be Guruji's granddaughter. Guruji confides to Shyamrao that Sanika is pregnant out of wedlock after being deceived by a man named Avinash. Shyamrao, upon hearing this, shares Varad's situation and proposes that Varad and Sanika should marry, believing they would be a suitable match. Guruji agrees, and the two are married.

After their marriage, a man named Shlok arrives at the Deshmukh residence. Sanika faints upon seeing him, though everyone except Shyamrao is pleased by his arrival. Shlok is revealed to be Varad's adopted elder brother. However, Shlok's constant advances toward Sanika make her uncomfortable, angering Shyamrao.

It is later revealed that Shlok and Avinash are the same person, and that Shlok was also the man known as Sagar who pushed Priya off the cliff earlier. When Varad and Sanika move temporarily to their farmhouse, Shlok visits and cryptically confesses his true identity to Sanika, reminding her of their past.

Shyamrao later meets Shlok at a dilapidated school, where it is revealed that Shyamrao had instructed Shlok to impregnate Sanika, as he wanted to ensure that only Deshmukh blood would continue his lineage. It is also revealed that Shlok is Shyamrao's biological son from another woman. The story then flashes back 25 years, when Shlok's mother, Kavita Sabnis (Mukta Barve), was a teacher at the same school where Shyamrao served as principal. The two fell in love, and Kavita became pregnant. When Shyamrao left her to marry Kalindi, Kavita confronted him and threatened to expose him. To protect his reputation, Shyamrao killed her, took the baby, and fabricated a story that Shlok had been adopted as an orphan. Motivated by revenge, Shlok returns to confront Shyamrao and demands that he confess his crime to the police. Shyamrao refuses, prompting Shlok to declare that a war between them is inevitable.

Meanwhile, Shyamrao becomes increasingly desperate to secure his Rajya Sabha ticket and even mortgages his house despite warnings from his friend Srinivas (Umesh Damle). He has Shlok arrested through deceit, but Kalindi bails him out. Later, Shlok attempts to abduct Sanika from the university, but Shyamrao intervenes. Shyamrao then hires a goon named Usman (Sanjay Narvekar) to kidnap Shlok until the elections are over. However, after learning about Shlok's past, Aslam sympathizes with him and helps him instead, falsely informing Shyamrao that Shlok has been captured. Aatya tells Shyamrao to stop his evil deeds but he tries to strangle her. However he is caught red-handed by Anna but says nothing out of awkwardness and tells him that he has secured the Rajya Sabha nomination

A celebration event is held at his university. During the event, Shlok exposes the truth about Shyamrao's past before the media. The news quickly spreads on social media, leading to widespread outrage. Shyamrao loses his election ticket, and students protest outside his university, tearing down his cutout in anger.

Upon returning home, Shyamrao finds that Kalindi, his aunt, Sanika, and Varad are preparing to leave him. Varad confronts his father, asserting that a man's worth is not defined by his ability to father children and also says that there are other ways to bring a child into this world. Shyamrao defends his actions, claiming he only sought to preserve his bloodline and he did it for Varad so that he wouldn't have to live in shame due his impotence. He further justifies by saying that a random child wouldn't have Deshmukh blood and wouldn't be able to run his educational trust. Kalindi reminds him that the educational trust was established by her father and he gave it Shyamrao. As Sanika attempts to leave, Shyamrao stops her, saying he never cared for her and only wanted the child she was carrying. Distraught, Sanika collapses and is hospitalized; though she survives, her unborn child dies.

In the final sequence, Shyamrao meets Shlok at the same abandoned school. He offers Shlok all his wealth in exchange for the child, but Shlok rejects him, saying that everything is already lost. Shlok hands Shyamrao a gun and tells him to end his own life. Realizing the truth of Shlok's words, Shyamrao shoots himself. Hearing the gunshot, Shlok looks toward the sky, feeling that justice has finally been served for his mother, and walks away.

== Cast ==
- Sachin Pilgaonkar as Dr. Shyamrao Deshmukh
- Swwapnil Joshi as Shlok/Avinash/Sagar
- Siddharth Chandekar as Varad Shyamrao Deshmukh
- Suchitra Bandekar as Kalandi Shyamrao Deshmukh
- Pranali Ghogare as Sanika Varad Deshmukh
- Anand Ingale as Anna
- Mukta Barve as Kavita Sabnis
- Prarthana Behere as Priya
- Sanjay Narvekar as Usman
- Madhav Abhyankar as Guruji
- Vijay Patwardhan as Janardan
- Shital Shukla as Aatya
- Umesh Damle as Srinivas
- Santosh Juvekar as Dancer in song “Naad Karaycha Naay“
- Vaibhav Tatwawadi as Dancer in song “Naad Karaycha Naay”
- Ali Asgar as Dancer in song “Naad Karaycha Naay”
- Prajakta Mali as Dancer in song “Vinayaka Gajanana”

== Reception ==
=== Critical response ===
Reshma Raikwar of Loksatta wrote "This confusion has proved fatal to his character. In fact, Swapnil's hard work both physically and mentally for this film is visible, but it does not make an impact. Despite being the first film, System Ghogre has played the role of Sanika well. Despite the potential in the story, director Rakesh Sarang's insistence on dramaturgy does not make this 'Battlefield' effective despite the powerful warriors". A reviewer from Lokmat says "It has to be said that Swapnil has won in this film. Swapnil has done amazing acting in many scenes only through eyes. The film's dialogues are also applaudable. Except for Sakhya Re, no song in the film is lip smacking. Overall if you are a fan of Swapnil Joshi then definitely don't miss this movie". Keyur Seta from Cinestaan.com says "There is nothing more to his act though. Swwapnil Joshi shows the right attitude needed for his mysterious character. But his character lacks depth and layers". Ibrahim Afghan from Maharashtra Times wrote "There is consistency in Sachin's acting. The role of Swapneel is actually completed by a hair dresser. He has acted while picking up his mouth". Mihir Bhanage of The Times of India says "The promos of this film had raised expectations and for a fair amount of time, the team tries to meet those. Ultimately, what could've been a pretty good watch ends up being just a decent one".
