= Vaidehi Parshurami =

Indian actress

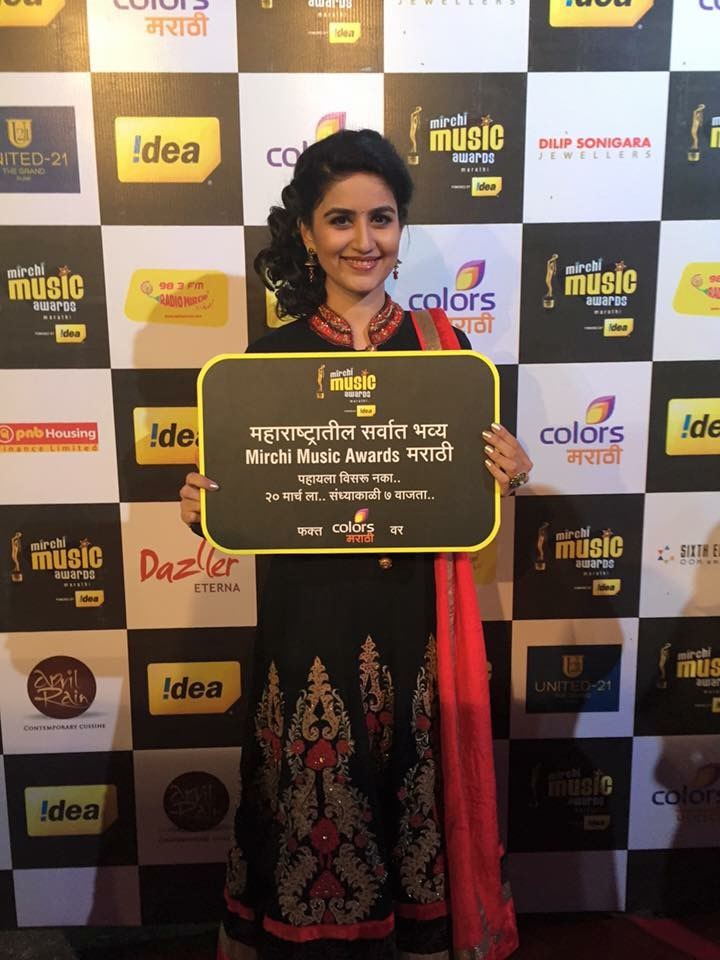
- Parshurami in 2016
- Born: 1 February 1992 (age 34); Mumbai, Maharashtra, India
- Occupation: Actress
- Years active: 2010–present

Vaidehi Parshurami (born 1 February 1992) is an Indian actress who works primarily in Marathi cinema, as well as in Hindi films, television and streaming projects. A trained Kathak dancer and a law graduate, she has established herself as one of the leading actresses of contemporary Marathi cinema and is the recipient of several accolades, including a Filmfare Award Marathi and a Zee Chitra Gaurav Puraskar for Best Actress, along with a nomination at the Maharashtra State Film Awards.

Born and raised in Mumbai, Parshurami made her film debut opposite Adinath Kothare in the romantic drama Ved Lavi Jeeva (2010), followed by supporting roles in Kokanastha (2013) and Vrundavan (2016), and an appearance in the Hindi thriller Wazir (2016). She gained wider recognition in 2018 with Rohit Shetty's action film Simmba, and her portrayal of Kanchan Ghanekar in the biopic Ani... Dr. Kashinath Ghanekar, which earned her the Zee Chitra Gaurav Puraskar for Most Natural Performance.

She went on to star in the commercially successful Marathi films Zombivli and Lochya Zaala Re (both 2022), and later appeared in Jaggu Ani Juliet (2023), which earned her a nomination at the 61st Maharashtra State Film Awards. In 2024, she made her streaming debut with Amazon Prime Video'sIndian Police Force and starred in Ek Don Teen Chaar as a newlywed expecting quadruplets, winning Best Actress at the Filmfare Awards Marathi. She later portrayed Bhamini in Subodh Bhave's period musical Sangeet Manapmaan (2025). Beyond films, Parshurami has hosted Marathi reality shows such as Fu Bai Fu and has served as a brand ambassador for Clean & Clear and P. N. Gadgil Jewellers.

== Early life ==
Parshurami was born on 1 February 1992 in Mumbai, Maharashtra, to Vaibhav and Sunanda Parshurami, both of whom are lawyers; her brother, Vikrant, is also a lawyer. She grew up in the Hindu Colony area of Dadar and attended the Indian Education Society's English medium school there, before completing junior college at Ramniranjan Anandilal Podar College of Commerce and Economics. She earned a Bachelor of Arts degree in English literature from Ramnarain Ruia College and later a Bachelor of Laws (LL.B.) from New Law College, Mumbai.

Parshurami began training in Kathak as a child and competed in several classical dance competitions during her school years. In 2012, she was named "Fresh Face of the Year" at a beauty pageant organised by The Times of India, and subsequently served as a brand ambassador for the skincare brand Clean & Clear.

== Career ==
=== Debut and early work (2010–2017) ===
Parshurami made her acting debut in 2010 with Ved Lavi Jeeva, a romantic drama directed by Mahesh Kothare. She played the female lead, a wealthy young woman who falls in love with a car mechanic played by Adinath Kothare, who was also making his debut as a lead actor. Her performance earned her a nomination at the Zee Chitra Gaurav Puraskar.

She next appeared in a supporting role in Mahesh Manjrekar's Kokanastha (2013), a drama centred on a Konkanastha Brahmin family. In 2016, she made her Hindi film debut in Bejoy Nambiar's thriller Wazir, playing Nina Dhar, the daughter of Amitabh Bachchan's character. The same year, she appeared alongside Raqesh Bapat and Pooja Sawant in the Marathi romantic drama Vrundavan (2016). She later featured in Manjrekar's ensemble comedy F.U.: Friendship Unlimited (2017), where her performance was noted.

=== Breakthrough and commercial success (2018–2023) ===
Parshurami gained wider recognition in 2018 for her portrayal of Kanchan Ghanekar in Abhijeet Deshpande's biographical film Ani... Dr. Kashinath Ghanekar, opposite Subodh Bhave, who played the titular role. Kanchan, the daughter of the veteran actress Sulochana Latkar, later became the second wife of theatre actor Kashinath Ghanekar. Her performance received praise, with The Common Man Speaks noting that she "doesn’t falter or let the presence of such stalwarts affect her performance". The film grossed ₹16 crore (equivalent to ₹23 crore or US$2.5 million in 2026) at the box office, becoming the fourth highest-grossing Marathi film of the year. She won the Most Natural Performance of the Year award at the Zee Chitra Gaurav Puraskar for her performance. Later that year, she appeared in Rohit Shetty's Hindi action film Simmba, starring Ranveer Singh, as Aakruti Dave, a young medical student whose assault and murder forms the central conflict of the narrative.

After a three-year hiatus, Parshurami returned to the screen with Aditya Sarpotdar's Zombivli (2022), promoted as the first zombie comedy in Marathi cinema, alongside Amey Wagh and Lalit Prabhakar. Her performance received praise from critics, with Kalpeshraj Kubal of Maharashtra Times highlighting the centrality of her character to the film's narrative and its portrayal of female empowerment. The film received positive critical reviews and was commercially successful. She next featured in the comedy-drama Lochya Zaala Re (2022), opposite Ankush Chaudhari and Siddharth Jadhav, portraying a woman who is forced to pose as the wife of her husband's friend. The film was adapted from the Marathi stage play Pati Sagle Uchapati and drew inspiration from the Hindi film All the Best: Fun Begins (2009). It received mixed reviews, with critics appreciating the trio's comic chemistry, and grossed ₹7.8 crore (equivalent to ₹9.0 crore or US$960,000 in 2026) at the box office.

In 2023, she reunited with Amey Wagh in Mahesh Limaye's romantic comedy Jaggu Ani Juliet, playing Julie "Juliet" Chitale, an Indian-American woman from Los Angeles who meets a outspoken man from Versova during a five-day trip to Uttarakhand. Her American accent received mixed reactions from reviewers, although several critics praised her emotional scenes and on-screen chemistry with Wagh. Lokmat described her portrayal of Juliet as "delightful". Although the film received a modest response commercially, her performance earned her a Best Actress nomination at the 61st Maharashtra State Film Awards.

=== Critical acclaim and recent work (2024–present) ===
She made her streaming debut with Rohit Shetty's Indian Police Force (2024), released on Amazon Prime Video, portraying a young woman who unknowingly marries a terrorist and later helps the police track him down. The series received mixed reviews, while Parshurami's performance was widely praised by critics. Bollywood Hungama stated, "Parshurami is the best performer of the show. Her character is well-written, and she does justice to it." In the same year, she starred opposite Nipun Dharmadhikari in Varun Narvekar's Ek Don Teen Chaar. She featured as a newlywed woman who discovers that she is pregnant with quadruplets, with the story following the couple as they navigate the difficult decision surrounding the pregnancy. Kalpeshraj Kubal of The Times of India noted that "Vaidehi conveys the emotions of a pregnant woman beautifully", while other reviewers praised her on-screen chemistry with Dharmadhikari. The role won her several Best Actress awards, including the Filmfare Awards Marathi and the Zee Chitra Gaurav Puraskar.

In 2025, Parshurami starred as the female lead in Subodh Bhave's musical Sangeet Manapmaan, a film adaptation of Krushnaji Prabhakar Khadilkar's 1911 stage play. She took on the role of Bhamini, the proud daughter of an army commander, who disguises herself as a village woman named Vanmala to expose the man to whom she is engaged. Her performance divided critics, with Sakal noting that "her role has shades and she has captured the bearings of the role well", while Nandini Ramnath of Scroll.in called her "a poor fit" for the part. Despite being among the most anticipated Marathi releases of the year, the film earned ₹2.5 crore (equivalent to ₹2.6 crore or US$280,000 in 2026) and emerged as a box-office disaster.

== Other work ==
=== Television ===
In 2022, she made her debut as a television host with the ninth season of Zee Marathi's comedy show Fu Bai Fu, which returned to the channel after a gap of nine years. In June 2023, she began hosting the second season of the Star Pravah children's singing reality show Mi Honar Superstar – Chhote Ustaad.

== Filmography ==
=== Films ===
Key
†	Denotes films that have not yet been released

Year	Title	Role	Language	Notes	Ref.
2010	Ved Lavi Jeeva	Rupali	Marathi	Debut film	
2013	Kokanastha	Vidya Gokhale	Marathi		
2016	Wazir	Nina Dhar	Hindi		
2016	Vrundavan	Bhumi Inamdar	Marathi		
2017	F.U.: Friendship Unlimited	Revati	Marathi		
2018	Ani... Dr. Kashinath Ghanekar	Kanchan Ghanekar	Marathi		
2018	Simmba	Aakruti Dave	Hindi		
2022	Zombivli	Seema Joshi	Marathi		
2022	Lochya Zaala Re	Dimple / Pooja	Marathi		
2023	Jaggu Ani Juliet	Juliet	Marathi		
2024	Ek Don Teen Chaar	Sayali	Marathi		
2025	Sangeet Manapmaan	Bhamini	Marathi		
2026	Aadi Anant	Celebrity	Marathi	Cameo appearance	

=== Television ===
Year	Title	Role	Channel	Notes	Ref.
2022	Fu Bai Fu - Jithe Asal, Tithe Hasal	Anchor	Zee Marathi	Season 9	
2023	Me Honar Superstar – Chhote Ustad	Anchor	Star Pravah	Season 2	
2024	Indian Police Force	Nafisa Khan	Amazon Prime		

=== Theatre ===
- Kathateet

== Awards and nominations ==
Year	Awards	Category	Work	Result	Ref.
2025	Filmfare Awards Marathi	Best Actress	Ek Don Teen Chaar	Won	
2026	Indian National Cine Academy Awards	Best Actress – Marathi	Sangeet Manapmaan	Nominated	
2025	MaTa Sanman	Best Actress	Ek Don Teen Chaar	Won	
2023	Maharashtra State Film Awards	Best Actress	Jaggu Ani Juliet	Nominated	
2018	Maharashtracha Favourite Kon?	Popular Face of the Year	—N/a	Won	
2019	Maharashtracha Favourite Kon?	Popular Face of the Year	—N/a	Nominated	
2021	Maharashtracha Favourite Kon?	Popular Face of the Year	—N/a	Nominated	
2022	Maharashtracha Favourite Kon?	Favourite Actress	Zombivli	Nominated	
2022	Maharashtracha Favourite Kon?	Popular Face of the Year	—N/a	Nominated	
2023	Maharashtracha Favourite Kon?	Popular Face of the Year	—N/a	Nominated	
2019	Radio City Cine Awards	Best Actress	Ani... Dr. Kashinath Ghanekar	Nominated	
2011	Zee Chitra Gaurav Puraskar	Best Actress	Ved Laavi Jeeva	Nominated	
2019	Zee Chitra Gaurav Puraskar	Most Natural Performance of the Year	Ani... Dr. Kashinath Ghanekar	Won	
2025	Zee Chitra Gaurav Puraskar	Best Actress	Ek Don Teen Chaar	Won	
2025	Zee Chitra Gaurav Puraskar	Best Jodi	Ek Don Teen Chaar	Won	
2026	Zee Chitra Gaurav Puraskar	Best Actress	Sangeet Manapmaan	Nominated	
2026	Zee Chitra Gaurav Puraskar	Natural Talent of the Year	Sangeet Manapmaan	Won	
2020	Zee Yuva Sanmaan	Youthful Face of the Year	—N/a	Won	
