= Mumbai Pune Mumbai 3 =

2018 film directed by Satish Rajwade

Mumbai-Pune-Mumbai 3
- Directed by: Satish Rajwade
- Screenplay by: Ashwini Shende; Pallavi Rajwade; Satish Rajwade
- Story by: Pallavi Rajwade
- Produced by: Sanjay Chhabria
- Starring: Swapnil Joshi; Mukta Barve; Prashant Damle; Mangal Kenkre; Vijay Kenkre; Savita Prabhune; Suhas Joshi; Rupal Nand
- Music by: Avinash Vishwajeet; Nilesh Moharir
- Production companies: Eros International; 52 Friday Cinemas; Everest Entertainment
- Distributed by: Eros International
- Release date: December 7, 2018 (India)
- Country: India
- Language: Marathi
- Box office: est.₹19 crore

Mumbai-Pune-Mumbai 3 is a 2018 Indian Marathi language romantic drama film directed by Satish Rajwade and produced by 52 Friday Cinemas and Everest Entertainment and distributed by Eros International. The film is the third installment to the Mumbai-Pune-Mumbai film series before its prequels titled Mumbai-Pune-Mumbai (2010) and Mumbai-Pune-Mumbai 2 (2015). Released theatrically on 7 December 2018, the film stars Swapnil Joshi and Mukta Barve in lead roles and Prashant Damle, Mangal Kenkre, Vijay Kenkre, Savita Prabhune, Suhas Joshi and Rupal Nand in supporting roles. The screenplay and the dialogues are written by Ashwini Shende, Pallavi Rajwade and Satish Rajwade. The film score and soundtrack album are composed by Avinash-Vishwajeet and Nilesh Moharir.

== Cast ==
- Swapnil Joshi as Gautam Shekhar Pradhan
- Mukta Barve as Gauri Ashok Deshpande / Gauri Gautam Pradhan
- Prashant Damle as Shekhar Amar Pradhan: Mrs. Pradhan's husband; Gautam's father
- Mangal Kenkre as Mrs. Shekhar Pradhan: Shekhar's wife; Suhas' daughter-in-law; Gautam's mother
- Vijay Kenkre as Ashok Deshpande: Sunanda's husband; Gauri and Rashmi's father; Gautam's father-in-law
- Savita Prabhune as Sunanda Ashok Deshpande: Ashok's wife; Gauri and Rashmi's mother; Gautam's mother-in-law
- Suhas Joshi as Suhasini "Suhas" Amar Pradhan: Shekhar's mother; Mrs. Pradhan's mother-in-law
- Rupal Nand as Rashmi Ashok Deshpande: Ashok and Sunanda's younger daughter; Gauri's younger sister
- Rohini Hattangadi as Dr. Shubhu (Mavshi): Gauri's gynaecologist; Suhas' best friend

== Soundtrack ==
Mumbai Pune Mumbai 3

Soundtrack album by Avinash-Vishwajeet, Nilesh Moharir
- Released: 13 November 2018
- Recorded: 2018
- Genre: Feature film soundtrack
- Length: 11:21
- Language: Marathi
- Labels: Everest Marathi, Saregama Marathi
- Producer: Sanjay Chhabria

Avinash and Vishwajeet are the music directors for the film. The songs featured in the film are composed by Nilesh Moharir, Avinash-Vishwajeet and lyrics are written by Devyani Karve-Kothari, Pallavi Rajwade and Vishwajeet Joshi.

Everest Entertainment released the music video of the song "Kuni Yenar Ga" on 12 November 2018 on YouTube. The song is sung by Hrishikesh Ranade, Aanandi Joshi, Saee Tembhekar, Jaydeep Bagwadkar, Varsha Bhave, Yogita Godbole and Mandar Apte. It is composed by Nilesh Moharir and lyrics are penned by Devayani Karve Kothari and Pallavi Rajwade. The second song of the film, "Aali Thumkat Naar" from the 1972 film Pinjara originally sung by Vishnu Waghmare and composed by Ram Kadam has been recreated for this film by Avinash-Vishwajeet in the voices of Aadarsh Shinde and it was released on 3 December 2018.

The third song "Tula Pahata" was released on 6 December 2018. The song is sung by Hrishikesh Ranade, composed by Avinash-Vishwajeet and lyrics are penned by Vishwajeet Joshi and Jay Atre.

=== Track listing ===
No.	Title	Lyrics	Music	Singer(s)	Length
1.	"Kuni Yenar Ga"	Devyani Karve-Kothari, Pallavi Rajwade	Nilesh Moharir	Aanandi Joshi, Saee Tembhekar, Varsha Bhave, Yogita Godbole-Pathak	3:36
2.	"Aali Thumkat Naar"	Vishwajeet Joshi, Jagdish Khebudkar	Avinash-Vishwajeet, Ram Kadam	Adarsh Shinde	3:05
3.	"Tula Pahata"	Vishwajeet Joshi, Jay Atre	Avinash-Vishwajeet	Hrishikesh Ranade	4:40
Total length:					11:21

== Production ==
=== Development ===
Director Satish Rajwade had announced Mumbai Pune Mumbai 3 during the promotion of Mumbai-Pune-Mumbai 2. In the film Mukta Barve and Swapnil Joshi will be playing lead roles and Prashant Damle, Mangal Kenkre, Vijay Kenkre, Savita Prabhune and Suhas Joshi forms the supporting cast.

== Release ==
=== Marketing ===
The first look of the film's official motion logo released on 2 August 2018 on YouTube. The films official small teaser released on YouTube on 4 October 2018. Everest Entertainment released the official trailer of the film on 26 November 2018.

== Box office ==
Mumbai Pune Mumbai 3 opened on a very positive note at the box office especially in metro cities. It collected around ₹5 crore (US$520,000) in the opening weekend and ₹19 crore (US$2.0 million) in its entire theatrical run.
