= Ek Don Teen Chaar =

2024 Marathi-language romantic comedy-drama film

- Directed by: Varun Narvekar
- Written by: Nipun Dharmadhikari; Varun Narvekar
- Produced by: Jyoti Deshpande; Ranjit Gugle; Keyur Godse; Nipun Dharmadhikari; Neeraj Biniwale
- Starring: Nipun Dharmadhikari; Vaidehi Parshurami
- Cinematography: Milind Jog
- Edited by: Aniket Kale
- Music by: Saurabh Bhalerao; Yashraj Mukhate
- Production companies: Jio Studios; Bahawa Entertainment; Sixteen By Sixty-Four Productions
- Distributed by: Jio Studios
- Release date: 19 July 2024
- Running time: 128 minutes
- Country: India
- Language: Marathi

Ek Don Teen Chaar (also known as 1234) is a 2024 Indian Marathi-language romantic comedy-drama film directed by Varun Narvekar, who co-wrote the screenplay with Nipun Dharmadhikari. The film was produced by Jyoti Deshpande under the banner of Jio Studios, along with Ranjit Gugle, Keyur Godse, Nipun Dharmadhikari and Neeraj Biniwale under the banners of Bahawa Entertainment and Sixteen By Sixty-Four Productions. It stars Nipun Dharmadhikari and Vaidehi Parshurami in the lead roles. The story revolves around a young married couple who discover that they are expecting quadruplets.

The film was released theatrically on 19 July 2024. Parshurami won the Filmfare Award Marathi for Best Actress.

== Plot ==
Sameer "Samya" and Sayali fall in love during their college days and marry at the age of 23, settling into a rented house in Pune. Soon after the wedding, Sayali discovers that she is pregnant. During a sonography, their doctor informs them that Sayali is carrying quadruplets, a rare case occurring roughly once in six lakh pregnancies. The initially overjoyed couple, along with their families, struggle to cope with the news, and the strain of the impending parenthood begins to test their relationship. The couple are eventually faced with a difficult choice about whether to continue with all four pregnancies.

== Cast ==
- Nipun Dharmadhikari as Sameer "Samya"
- Vaidehi Parshurami as Sayali
- Mrinal Kulkarni as Sayali's mother
- Hrishikesh Joshi as Sameer's father
- Shaila Kanekar as Sameer's mother
- Satish Alekar as Dr. Vivek Bhave
- Karan Sonawane as Dadhi, Sameer's friend
- Maithili Patwardhan as Rama
- Suhas Shirsat as Patil
- Amey Wagh in a special appearance

== Production ==
=== Development ===
The film was announced by Jio Studios in September 2022 as part of its slate of Marathi films and series, with an initial release scheduled for February 2023. It marked Varun Narvekar's next directorial venture following Muramba (2017).

=== Casting ===
Nipun Dharmadhikari and Vaidehi Parshurami were cast in the lead roles, marking their first on-screen pairing. The film also marked Dharmadhikari's first major leading role in a feature film. Social media influencer Karan Sonawane, popularly known as "Focused Indian", made his Marathi film debut with the film.

== Soundtrack ==
Ek Don Teen Chaar

Soundtrack album by Saurabh Bhalerao and Yashraj Mukhate
- Released: 4 July 2024
- Genre: Feature film soundtrack
- Length: 9:19
- Language: Marathi
- Label: Zee Music Marathi

Track listing
No.	Title	Lyrics	Music	Singer(s)	Length
1.	"Googly Googly"	Akshayraje Shinde	Saurabh Bhalerao	TEA	3:29
2.	"Love Chumbak"	Akshayraje Shinde	Yashraj Mukhate	Yashraj Mukhate, Sonal Kaushal	2:35
3.	"Googly Googly Remix"	AkshayRaje Shinde	Saurabh Bhalerao	TEA	2:50
4.	"Ek Don Teen Chaar Theme"	Yashraj Mukhate	Yashraj Mukhate	Yashraj Mukhate	0:25
Total length:					9:19

== Release ==
The first teaser was released on 24 November 2023, alongside the theatrical release of Jio Studios' Jhimma 2, and announced a release date of 5 January 2024. The release was later postponed, and in May 2024 the makers announced a new release date of 19 July 2024. A second teaser was released on 18 June 2024, followed by the official trailer in July 2024. The film was released theatrically on 19 July 2024 and distributed by Jio Studios.

== Reception ==
=== Critical response ===
Kalpeshraj Kubal of The Times of India rated the film 3 out of 5 stars, writing, “The film delivers what you expect from it and leaves a smile on your face.” Sanjay Ghavre of Lokmat gave the film 2.5 stars and described it as "it's worth watching to understand the curiosity of the newlyweds about children and the mentality of taking care of them." Film Information called the story unusual and found the first half entertaining, but felt the screenplay lost momentum after the interval; he praised the performances of Dharmadhikari and Parshurami, as well as the art direction and editing. Urbanly rated the film 3 out of 5 stars, calling it "a heartwarming tale of parenthood with a unique twist" and appreciating its non-linear narrative, production design and supporting performances, while criticising the songs and the background score.

=== Accolades ===
Award	Date of ceremony	Category	Recipient(s)	Result	Ref.
Zee Chitra Gaurav Puraskar	2025	Best Actress	Vaidehi Parshurami	Won	
Filmfare Awards Marathi	2025	Best Director	Varun Narvekar	Nominated	
Filmfare Awards Marathi	2025	Best Actress	Vaidehi Parshurami	Won	
Filmfare Awards Marathi	2025	Best Supporting Actress	Mrinal Kulkarni	Nominated	
Filmfare Awards Marathi	2025	Best Screenplay	Varun Narvekar, Nipun Dharmadhikari	Nominated	
Filmfare Awards Marathi	2025	Best Art Direction	Sampada Gejji	Nominated	
