= Prajakta Mali =

Indian actress (born 1989)

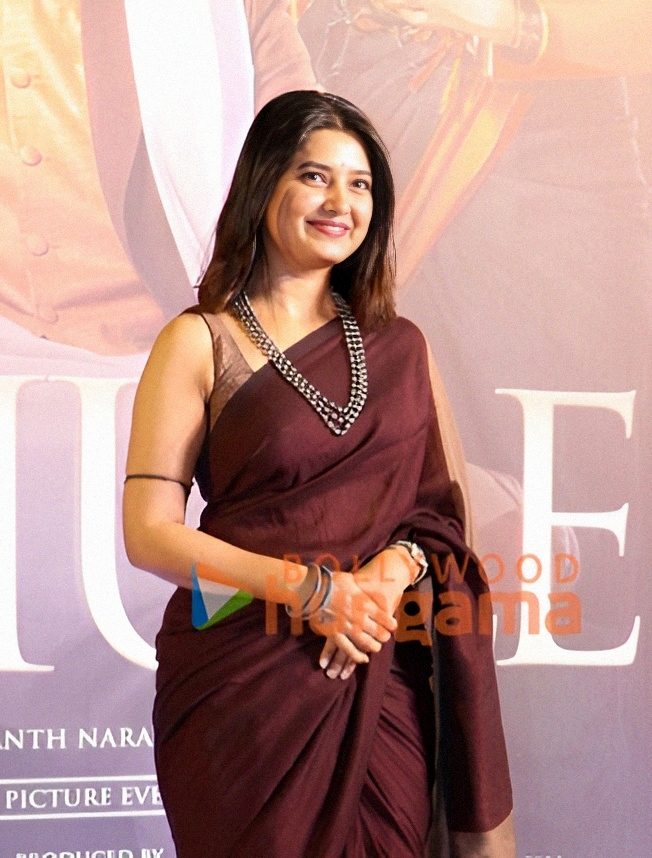
- Mali in 2025
- Born: 8 August 1989 (age 37); Barshi, Solapur, Maharashtra, India
- Occupations: Actress; television presenter; poet; producer
- Years active: 2004–present
- Height: 1.60 m (5 ft 3 in)
- Website: prajaktaraj.in

Prajakta Mali (pronounced [prədʒəkt̪aː ˈmaːli]; born 8 August 1989) is an Indian actress, producer, and poet who primarily works in Marathi films and television.

Born in Pandharpur and raised in Pune, Mali won the dance reality show Kya Masti Kya Dhoom at the age of 14. She had an uncredited role in Ashutosh Gowariker's Swades (2004) and also appeared as a child artist in the Marathi drama film Taandala – Ek Mukhavta (2008). After appearing in several Marathi daily soaps, she gained recognition for her role as Meghana in the romantic drama series Julun Yeti Reshimgathi (2013–2015).

Mali made her lead film debut with Kedar Shinde’s comedy-drama Kho-Kho (2013). She later received critical acclaim for her performances in Hampi (2017), the comedy thriller Dokyala Shot (2019), the comedy Pandu (2021), the family drama Luckdown Be Positive, and the social thriller Y (both 2022). For her role in Pandu, she won the MFK Award for Favourite Villain. Since 2018, she has been hosting the comedy sketch show Maharashtrachi Hasyajatra on Sony Marathi. In 2022, she made her web debut with Abhijit Panse’s thriller drama RaanBaazaar, where she portrayed a prostitute, earning widespread acclaim. This was followed by her title role as a renowned dancer in the epic historical drama Phullwanti (2024), which also marked her debut as a producer.

Beyond acting, Mali founded the Nrityangan Dance Academy in Pune and launched her traditional jewellery brand, PrajaktaRaj. She also published a poetry book titled Prajakta Prabha in 2021.

== Early life ==
Mali was born on 8 August 1989 in Barshi, Maharashtra, into a Marathi family. Later, her family moved to Pune. Her father is a retired CID officer, and her mother is Shweta Mali. She completed her Masters in Performing Arts (Bharatanatyam) from Lalit Kala Kendra, Pune University. She was also awarded a scholarship by the Ministry of Culture for higher studies in Bharatnatyam. At an early age, she founded her dance academy, Nrityangan Dance Academy, which currently has six branches in Pune. On her birthday in August 2026, Mali announced that she had adopted a vegan diet, citing health reasons after her body began rejecting dairy products.

== Career ==
=== Early work and Julun Yeti Reshimgathi (2001–2015) ===
Prajaktta participated in dance reality shows from an early age; at the age of 14, she won the Hindi dance show, Kya Masti Kya Dhoom (2001), which aired on Star Plus. She made her acting debut with an uncredited role in Shah Rukh Khan's starred Swades in 2004 and subsequently appeared in a small role in Gandhi, My Father. In 2008, she made her Marathi film debut as a child actress in Sanjay Surkar's Taandala - Ek Mukhavta, she played the young version of Asawari Joshi's character. The film didn't have any dialogue for Mali. Following this, she made her television debut with Firuni Navi Janmen Mi, produced under Kothare Vision. In 2011, she played the energetic young girl, whose world centers around her family, in the Marathi daily soap Suvasini, produced by Smita Talwalkar’s Asmita Chitra Productions.

In 2013, Mali got widespread recognition for her role as Meghana Kudalkar Desai opposite Lalit Prabhakar in the Julun Yeti Reshimgathi aired on Zee Marathi. The plot revolves around how the two become inseparable and face every obstacle together to be madly in love with each other. Next, she was a contestant on the fifth season of the dance reality show Eka Peksha Ek — Apsara Aali. The same year, she played a significant role as the love interest of the lead character, portrayed by Bharat Jadhav, in the critically acclaimed comedy drama Kho-Kho, directed by Kedar Shinde. The following year, she played the role of Bijli in the ensemble film Sangharsh.

=== Pivotal role and critical acclaim (2017–present) ===
After a gap of two years, in 2017, she was seen alongside Prabhakar and Sonalee Kulkarni in Prakash Kunte's romantic drama Hampi. Mihir Bhanage of The Times of India called her performance "convincing". Ulhas Shirke of Marathi Movie World wrote, "She does extremely well to invite the audience attention with her bubbly character for almost the next half an hour" and further concluded, "will surely help her to find better roles in Marathi films." The film was successful at the box office. Next, she appeared as a protagonist in Zee Marathi's comedy show Naktichya Lagnala Yaycha Ha, which had many special appearances by well-known Marathi celebrities opposite her, including Subodh Bhave, Siddharth Chandekar, Prasad Oak, Gashmeer Mahajani and Swapnil Joshi.

In 2018, Mali portrayed the girl next door character in an ensemble comedy drama Party opposite Suvrat Joshi. The film was not so well received by critics and audiences. The same year, she made two guest appearances in Ani... Dr. Kashinath Ghanekar and Ranangan. In the former, she enacted the role of Asha Kale in the superhit song "Gomu Sangatina" from the 1975 Marathi film Ha Khel Sawalyancha. The next year, she once again paired opposite Joshi in the black comedy film Dokyala Shot, a remake of the Tamil film Naduvula Konjam Pakkatha Kaanom (2012). The story is based on a true story that involves a young man who experiences retrograde amnesia after a cricket incident two days before his wedding. She played the Tamil girl, Subbulakshmi Iyengar, who falls in love with Marathi guy Abhijit. The film was a critical and commercial success. Critics appreciated her southern role but felt it was limited. She hosted Marathi television shows Maharashtrachi Hasyajatra for Sony Marathi in 2018 and Mast Maharashtra Travel Show in the year 2020 for Zee Marathi. Mali portrayed a negative role in the critical and commercial hit Pandu (2021), directed by Viju Mane. Mihir Bhanage of The Times of India described her as "a surprise package." She won Maharashtracha Favourite Kon for Favourite Villain. The film grossed ₹5.9 crore (US$610,000) worldwide.

In 2022, her first release was Digpal Lanjekar's directorial historical action drama Pawankhind, based on the life of Maratha warrior Baji Prabhu Deshpande. She played the real-life character of Shrimant Bhavanibai Bandal. The film was a huge commercial and critical success, becoming the fifth highest-grossing Marathi film of all time with earnings of ₹75 crore (US$7.8 million) worldwide. Her next release was the family drama Luckdown Be Positive, opposite Ankush Chaudhari. The film revolves around a married couple and the problems that arise due to lockdown. Preeti Atulkar of The Times of India ascribed Chaudhari and her chemistry as "remarkable" and wrote, "They look convincing as a couple on screen." She had a guest appearance as Naina Chandrapurkar in the musical romantic Chandramukhi, where she was seen in the song "Sawaal Jawaab" alongside Amruta Khanvilkar. Her last release of that year was critically acclaimed Y, which was screened at the Pune International Film Festival and MAMI Festival in 2019 before its theatrical release. A reviewer from Kalakruti Media praised the film’s subject but noted that, "Prajakta’s character could have been developed further, especially in the second half, where it remains somewhat incomplete." The same year, she made her digital debut with the political thriller RaanBaazaar, which was streamed on Planet Marathi OTT. The story revolves around the two escorts, who become entangled in a dangerous web of politics, power, and conspiracy. Mali portrayed the cheerful and generous prostitute from Kamathipura who works at a seedy brothel. Initially, she was reluctant to play a play sex worker, but her actor friends Prasad Oak and Khanvilkar convinced her to take the challenge. For her role, she had to gain 11 kg of weight and practice eating masala gutka. The series was one of the most anticipated and critically acclaimed series of the year. Kayur Seta of Cinestaan wrote that "Mali goes completely against her image and gives a great performance as Ratna." Shaheen Irani of OTT Play called her "powerful" and wrote, "She plays her role to perfection, and to an extent, you get drawn to understanding her fun-loving character that is also very influential." It emerged as the most watched Marathi web series, with more than 10 million views. In 2023, she had only one film release—Hrishikesh Joshi's comedy-drama Teen Adkun Sitaram, where she starred alongside Vaibhav Tatwawadi, Alok Rajwade, and Sankarshan Karhade. The film was well-received by critics but performed averagely at the box office.

The following year marked a significant turning point in her career when she co-produced and starred in the titular role of the epic historical drama Phullwanti, directed by Snehal Tarde. Marking her debut as a producer, the film was based on Babasaheb Purandare's novel of the same name. She portrayed a renowned dancer from the Peshwa era, with the story set in 18th-century Pune, exploring the complex relationship of love and rivalry between her character and Venkatadhwari Shastri (played by Gashmeer Mahajani). Maharashtra Times critic Kalpeshraj Kubal wrote, "Prajakta’s expressive dance ensures that Phullwanti gets a distinct identity." Santosh Bhingarde of Sakal praised the team's hard work, stating, "Mali has made a great impression in both acting and dancing. She has effectively captured the character's self-respect, ego, sacrifice, and love." Meanwhile, Anub George from The Times of India noted, "Mali’s dance falls short of the reputation built for Phullwanti. That said, what Mali lacks in dance, she makes up for with her acting prowess." The film was declared a hit at the box office, earning ₹7.5 crore (US$780,000) worldwide and becoming the eighth highest-grossing Marathi film of 2024. For her performance, she went on to win the Filmfare Marathi Award and the Sanskruti Kala Darpan Award for Best Actress, while the film received several nominations for Best Film across various award ceremonies.

== Other works ==
In July 2021, Mali published the first edition of her poetry collection, Prajakta Prabha. The book was released by veteran writer and lyricist Praveen Davane, along with chief guests Akshay Bardapurkar, Amruta Khanvilkar, Pushkar Shrotri, and Abhijit Panse. Speaking about the book, she said, "I was writing poems for myself, not to get them published or posted on social media. I never dreamed that my poetry collection would come out. It's all coming together by chance." In November of the same year, she released the third edition of her book on the inaugural day of the All India Marathi Literature Conference, organized by Lokhitwadi Mandal, Nashik, in the presence of Food, Civil Supplies, and Consumer Protection Minister Chhagan Bhujbal. In January 2023, she launched her traditional jewelry brand, PrajaktaRaj, which was unveiled by MNS President Raj Thackeray. The brand, known for its affordable jewelry with traditional designs, quickly gained popularity in a short period. In May 2026, Mali walked the red carpet at the 2026 Cannes Film Festival, wearing a traditional Maharashtrian nauvari saree, as part of the team launching the Marathi OTT platform Abhijat Marathi.

== Filmography ==
=== Films ===
Key
†	Denotes films that have not yet been released

- All films are in Marathi, unless otherwise noted the language.

Year	Film	Role	Notes	Ref.
2004	Swades	College girl	Hindi film; Uncredited role	
2007	Gandhi, My Father	Gulab's friend	Hindi film	
2008	Taandala – Ek Mukhavta	Sonsala	Child artist	
2013	Kho-Kho	Suman		
2014	Sangharsh	Bijli		
2015	Mahanayak Vastant Tu	—N/a	Guest Appearance	
2017	Hampi	Girija		
2017	Anaan			
2018	Ani... Dr. Kashinath Ghanekar	Asha Kale	Special appearance in song "Gomu Sangtina"	
2018	Ranangan	—N/a	Special appearance in song "Vinayaka Gajanana"	
2018	Party	Arpita		
2019	Dokyala Shot	Subbulakshmi Iyengar		
2019	Manikarnika: The Queen of Jhansi	Kashi Bai	Hindi film; Uncredited role	
2021	Pandu	Karunatai Pathare		
2022	Pawankhind	Shrimant Bhavanibai Bandal		
2022	Luckdown Be Positive	Sapana		
2022	Chandramukhi	Naina Chandrapurkar	Special appearance in the song "Sawaal Jawaab"	
2022	Y	Reema		
2023	Teen Adkun Sitaram	Reva		
2024	Nach Ga Ghuma	Herself	Special appearance in the song "Nach Ga Ghuma"	
2024	Phullwanti	Phullwanti		
2025	ChikiChiki BooBoomBoom	Ravee		

=== Television ===
Year	Show	Role	Channel	Notes	Ref(s)
2001	Kya Masti Kya Dhoom	Contestant	Star Plus	Winner	
2010	Firuni Navi Janmen Mi	Shreayasee	Fakt Marathi		
2010-2011	Bandh Reshmache	Aditti	Star Pravah		
2011-2013	Suvasini	Savitri	Star Pravah		
2013	Eka Peksha Ek - Apsara Aali	Contestant	Zee Marathi		
2013-2015	Julun Yeti Reshimgathi	Meghna Desai	Zee Marathi		
2017	Naktichya Lagnala Yaycha Ha	Nupur Deshpande	Zee Marathi		
2018–present	Maharashtrachi Hasyajatra	Host	Sony Marathi		
2020	Mast Maharashtra	Host	Zee Marathi		
2021-2023	Indian Idol Marathi	Host	Sony Marathi		

=== Web series ===
Year	Serial	Role	Notes
2022	RaanBaazaar	Ratna	
2026	Devkhel	Sarika Nimkar	

== Accolades ==
Year	Awards	Category	Work	Result	Ref.
2022	Maharashtra Governor Award	Kamala Rising Stars Award	Contribution in the Field of Art	Won	
2022	e4m Play Streaming Media Awards	Best Host	Indian Idol Marathi	Won	
2023	Maharashtracha Favourite Kon?	Favourite Villain	Pandu	Won	
2023	Majja Digital Award	Best Supporting Actress	Y	Won	
2023	Zee Yuva Sanman Puraskar	Tejaswi Chehra (Glamours Face)	—N/a	Won	
2023	Planet Marathi Film and OTT Awards	Best Actress OTT	RaanBaazaar	Won	
2024	Maharashtra Sahitya Parishad	Sunitabai Smruti Sahitya Puraskar	Prajakta Prabha	Won	
2025	Zee Chitra Gaurav Puraskar	Best Film	Phullwanti	Nominated	
2025	Zee Chitra Gaurav Puraskar	Best Actress	Phullwanti	Nominated	
2025	Zee Chitra Gaurav Puraskar	The Most Natural Performance Of The Year	Phullwanti	Won	
2025	City Cine Awards	Best Film	Phullwanti	Nominated	
2025	City Cine Awards	Best Actress	Phullwanti	Nominated	
2025	NDTV Marathi Entertainment Awards	Best Film	Phullwanti	Nominated	
2025	NDTV Marathi Entertainment Awards	Best Actress in a Leading Role	Phullwanti	Won	
2025	MaTa Sanman	Best Film	Phullwanti	Nominated	
2025	MaTa Sanman	Best Actress	Phullwanti	Nominated	
2025	Sanskruti Kala Darpan Awards	Best Film	Phullwanti	Won	
2025	Sanskruti Kala Darpan Awards	Best Actress	Phullwanti	Won	
2025	Filmfare Awards Marathi	Best Film	Phullwanti	Nominated	
2025	Filmfare Awards Marathi	Best Actress	Phullwanti	Won	
2025	Zee24Taas Marathi Sanman	Best Actress	Phullwanti	Won	
2026	Deenanath Pratishthan	Ma. Deenanath Mangeshkar Chitrapat Seva Puraskar	—N/a	Honoured	
2026	International Iconic Awards	Best Actress Web Series Indian OTT	Devkhel	Won	
