= Kashinath Ghanekar =

Indian film and stage actor and Doctor (1930–1986)

Dr. Kashinath Ghanekar
- Born: Kashinath Ghanekar; 14 September 1930; Chiplun, Bombay State, British India (present-day Maharashtra, India)
- Died: 2 March 1986 (aged 55); Amravati, Maharashtra, India
- Education: BDS (Mumbai)
- Occupations: Theatre, movie actor
- Spouse(s): Irawati Bhide (divorced) Kanchan Ghanekar (m. 1983)
- Relatives: Sulochana Latkar (mother-in-law)

Kashinath Ghanekar (14 September 1930 – 2 March 1986) was a popular stage and Film actor also a dental surgeon. He won the Maharashtra State Film Award for Best Actor for film Pathlaag.

== Early life ==
Ghanekar was born in the Chiplun and did his schooling and higher studies in Chiplun, Maharashtra, India.

== Personal life ==
He married twice. He was married to Irawati M. Bhide, a gynaecologist and obstetrician. His first marriage was childless and ended in divorce. He subsequently married a much younger woman, Kanchan, the daughter of Marathi actress Sulochana Latkar. This marriage was harmonious. After his death Kanchan penned a biography titled Nath Ha Maza, meaning "such was my husband".

== Career ==
Ghanekar was the first superstar of the Marathi stage with a lot of glamour, and he was the highest paid star from the years 1960 to 1980. He appeared in Marathi films in the 1960s. In addition to Marathi stage and movies, he appeared in Hindi movies such as Abhilasha opposite Nanda and Dadi Maa where he played the role of the son of Ashok Kumar and Bina Rai.

The role that made him a popular actor was that of Sambhaji in the play Raigadala Jevha Jaag Yete (When Raigad Awakens) written by the play writer, Vasant Kanetkar. The most notable character played by him was "Lalya" in the play Ashroonchi Zhali Phule. Some of the other noted plays he acted in are: Ithe Oshalala Mrutyu, Garambicha Bapu, Anandi Gopal, Shitu, Tujhe Aahe Tujpashi, Sundar Mi Honar and Madhumanjiri.

The film Madhuchandra (in 1968) made Ghanekar, a noted stage actor, a major Marathi film star. One of his most popular films in Marathi is the mystery movie Ha Khel Savlyancha with Asha Kale.

== Death and legacy ==
Ghanekar died of a heart attack during one of the tours of his plays, at his hotel room at Amravati.

- The Dr. Kashinath Ghanekar Natyagruha, a modern theater with an auditorium, was built by the Thane Municipal Corporation.
- In November 2018, Ani... Dr. Kashinath Ghanekar a Marathi-language feature film was released; starring Subodh Bhave as Dr Ghanekar, Sonali Kulkarni, Sumeet Raghavan, Vaidehi Parashurami, Prasad Oak, Nandita Dhuri, Anand Ingale and Mohan Joshi in prominent roles. It is a biographical drama directed by Abhijeet shirish Deshpande.

== Theatre ==
Below is a list of stage plays where Ghanekar played a significant role. Year mentioned is when the Play was first performed on a public stage.

| Year | Name of Play | Role |
|---|---|---|
| 1952 | Shitu | Shitu |
| 1952 | Tujhe Aahe Tujpashi | Acharya |
| 1952 | Sundar Mi Honar | Maharaj |
| 1952 | Madhumanjiri | |
| 1952 | Laxmi Aali Ghara | |
| 1962 | Raygadala Jevha Jaag Yete | Chh. Sambhaji Maharaj |
| 1963 | Ashroonchi Zhali Phule | Lalya |
| 1968 | Ithe Oshalala Mrutyu | Sambhaji Maharaj |
| 1972 | Garambicha Bapu | Bapu |
| 1972 | Guntata Hriday He | |
| 1976 | Anandi Gopal | Gopalrao Joshi |

== Filmography ==
| Year | Film | Role | Notes |
|---|---|---|---|
| 1953 | Dharma Patni | Mohan | Debut |
| 1963 | Pahu Re Kiti Vaat | Kashi | |
| 1964 | Maratha Tituka Melvava | Bhavya | |
| 1964 | Pathlaag | Balasaheb Panse | |
| 1965 | Padchaya | Raja | |
| 1965 | Laxmi Aali Ghara | Laxmi's husband | |
| 1966 | Daadi Maa | Somu | Hindi film |
| 1967 | Madhuchandra | Dinu Khare | |
| 1968 | Ekati | Surekha's husband | |
| 1968 | Preet Shikva Mala | Vasanta | |
| 1968 | Abhilasha | Dr. Ajay Singh | Hindi film |
| 1970 | Dev Manoos | Prasad | |
| 1970 | Garambicha Bapu | Bapu | |
| 1970 | Manla Tar Dev | Doctor | |
| 1971 | Ajab Tuje Sarkar | Sachya | |
| 1971 | Jhep | Ravindra Phanse | |
| 1974 | Gupt Gyan | Professor | Hindi film |
| 1975 | Ghar Gangecha Kathi | Jayshree's husband | |
| 1976 | Ha Khel Sawalyancha | Dr. Shekhar Thorat | |
| 1978 | Chandra Hota Sakshila | Shridhar | |
