= Guddu Engineer =

- Directed by: Nikkhil Advani
- Screenplay by: Aseem Arora
- Story by: Aseem Arora
- Produced by: Nikkhil Advani; Monisha Advani; Madhu Bhojwani
- Starring: Prabuddh Dyma; Pranali Ghogare
- Cinematography: Soumik Mukherjee
- Edited by: Charu Shree Roy
- Music by: Arjuna Harjai
- Production company: Emmay Entertainment
- Release date: 2016
- Running time: 42 minutes
- Country: India
- Language: Hindi

Guddu Engineer is a 2016 Indian Short romantic drama film directed and co-produced by Nikkhil Advani and written by Aseem Arora. It starred Prabuddh Dyma and Pranali Ghogare.

== Plot ==
The story revolves around Guddu, an engineering student, who is having a near perfect life. To impress his girlfriend, Sonia, Guddu makes a wish list and manages to achieve all of it. However, a simple choice between love and hate changes it all.

== Cast ==
- Prabuddh Dyma as Guddu
- Pranali Ghogare as Sonia
- Ananya Banerjee as Sonia's friend

== Awards ==
Year	Organization	Category	Nominee(s)	Result	Ref.
2017	5th Mumbai Shorts International Film Festival	Best Film Production House	Emmay Entertainment	Won	
2017	5th Mumbai Shorts International Film Festival	Best Music	Arjuna Harjai	Won	
