= Mere Rang Mein Rangne Waali =

- Genre: Indian Soap Opera; Youth Show; Romance
- Created by: Rajshri Productions
- Written by: Rohini, Sonali and Gitanshu; Jyoti Sekhri
- Starring: See Below
- Opening theme: Mere Rang Mein Rangne Waali
- Country of origin: India
- Original language: Hindi
- No. of seasons: 1
- No. of episodes: 170

Production
- Producer: Kavita K. Barjatya
- Camera setup: single-camera
- Running time: 24 minutes
- Production company: Rajshri Productions

Original release
- Network: Life OK
- Release: 17 November 2014 – 10 July 2015

Mere Rang Mein Rangne Waali (transl. The One Who Will Be Colored in My Colors) is an Indian youth soap opera on Life OK, produced by Rajshri Productions. Starring Samridh Bawa and Pranali Ghogare, it premiered on 17 November 2014 and went off air on 10 July 2015.

== Plot ==
Radha, an aspiring actress, lives in Mumbai with her family. Leeladhar (LD) belongs to a traditional family. Radha and LD always plot against each other. LD plans to prank Radha, and both of them end up trapped in an unwanted marriage.

After much persuasion, Radha agrees to stay. While LD has fallen in love with Radha, she goes with him to Mathura to compel him to sign divorce papers but he wins her over and a grand wedding ceremony is planned for them.

LD's grandfather, Dadaji, has other plans and makes Radha sign a blank document which turns out to be a complaint by "Radha" alleging she was tortured by LD's family. On the wedding day, seeing Radha's love and concern for LD, Dadaji drops the idea of filing the complaint but Radha's uncle does not let him change his decision. The police arrive and arrest most of the members of LD's family.

On discovering the signed document, Radha decides to take the blame on herself to spare her grandfather being humiliated. That same day, Dadaji falls ill and is paralysed. With no one to prove her innocence, Radha is thrown out of the house by LD and his family.

=== One year later ===
LD requests Radha to return, but hates her. Radha has become a well known actress. Actor Kabir proposes to Radha. Neha tries to get them married with the help of her brother, Abhishek, who later falls for Jahnvi. Kabir learns about LD and Radha and confronts her. LD knows about Radha's love for him. Dadaji recovers and reveals his role in the misunderstanding between Radha and LD. LD and Radha remarry with the approval of Kabir. At last, the Chaturvedis are reunited.

== Cast ==
=== Main ===
- Samridh Bawa as Leeladhar Chaturvedi or LD
- Pranali Ghogare as Radha Pathak Chaturvedi

=== Recurring ===
- Alok Nath as Shankarnath Chaturvedi
- Mahesh Thakur as Govind Chaturvedi
- Dolly Sohi as Sadhana Chaturvedi
- Imran Zahid as Sudhakar Pathak
- Surbhi Zaveri Vyas as Suhasini Pathak
- Suchitra Bandekar as Ishaani Chaturvedi
- Amit Bhanushali as Murlidhar Chaturvedi
- Rashmi Gupta as Shamlee Chaturvedi
- Harsh Vashisht as Mohan Bhanwari Chaturvedi
- Karuna Pandey as Jayashree Chaturvedi
- Vishnu Bholwani as Himansh Pathak
- Renuka Shahne as Lawyer Renuka Deshmukh
- Akshaya Naik as Easha Deshmukh
- Dhiraj Totlani as Mukul
- Khushwant Walia as Kabir Kapoor
- Sonali Naik as Shivani
- Alefia Kapadia as Neha
- Kushabh Manghani as Abhishek
