= Zombivli =

- Theatrical release poster
- Directed by: Aditya Sarpotdar
- Written by: Mahesh Iyer
- Produced by: Vikram Mehra; Siddharth Anand Kumar
- Starring: Amey Wagh; Vaidehi Parshurami; Lalit Prabhakar
- Cinematography: Lawrence D'Cunha
- Edited by: Jayant Jathar
- Music by: Rohan-Rohan
- Production company: Saregama India Ltd.
- Distributed by: AA Films
- Release date: 26 January 2022
- Running time: 134 minutes
- Country: India
- Language: Marathi

Zombivli is a 2022 Indian Marathi-language zombie-comedy film directed by Aditya Sarpotdar. The film stars Lalit Prabhakar, Vaidehi Parshurami, Amey Wagh and Trupti Khamkar in lead roles. It was released in theatres on 26 January 2022 and digitally premiered on ZEE5 on 20 May 2022.

== Plot ==
Set in Dombivli, the story follows two individuals from contrasting backgrounds—Sudhir, an engineer, and Vishwas, a slum leader—who are forced to unite when a mysterious infection begins turning people into zombies. As chaos unfolds, the pair must navigate a city descending into panic while uncovering a disturbing corporate conspiracy.

== Cast ==
- Amey Wagh as Sudhir Joshi
- Vaidehi Parshurami as Seema Joshi, Sudhir's wife
- Lalit Prabhakar as Vishwas
- Trupti Khamkar as Malti
- Sharat Sonu as Prakash Dubey
- Renuka Daftardar as Sudhir's mother
- Vighnesh Joshi as building resident
- Tushar Khair as doctor
- Vijay Nikam as Appa Musale
- Janaki Pathak as Anjali
- Rajendra Shisatkar as building resident
- Janardan Kadam as zombie
- Siddhartha Jadhav in a guest appearance in the song "Angaat Alaya"
- Sanjay Borkar as Inspector Koli

== Production ==
=== Pre-production ===
The screenplay was completed during the COVID-19 lockdown in Maharashtra. As Dombivli remained a hotspot, most of the planning and design work, including zombie makeup and storyboarding, was done remotely or in alternative locations.

=== Filming ===
Principal photography began in 2020, with 90% of the film shot in Latur due to safer conditions. Exterior and aerial shots were filmed in Dombivli. The team followed strict COVID-19 protocols throughout production.

== Release ==
=== Theatrical ===
Zombivli was released theatrically on 26 January 2022.

=== Home media ===
The film premiered digitally on ZEE5 on 20 May 2022.

== Reception ==
Zombivli received positive reviews from critics for its unique blend of horror and social commentary. Mihir Bhanage of The Times of India described it as a "zombie apocalypse with a dash of humour" and praised its pace and climax. Nandini Ramnath of Scroll.in called it a tribute to Shaun of the Dead, noting that the satire lay more with the living than the undead. Maharashtra Times highlighted the film's technical achievements, including makeup, VFX, and background score.

== Copyright issues ==
Filmmaker Tarun Wadhwa filed a petition in the Bombay High Court alleging that Saregama India Limited used his idea without permission. He claimed to have submitted the concept through the Screenwriters Association to Yoodlee Films. The court ruled that there was no infringement, as copyright does not protect ideas, and allowed the film's release.
