= Mi Honar Superstar =

2020 Indian Marathi-language reality show

- Presented by: See here
- Judges: See below
- Country of origin: India
- Original language: Marathi
- No. of seasons: 5
- No. of episodes: 145

Production
- Production locations: Mumbai, Maharashtra
- Camera setup: Multi-camera
- Running time: 45 minutes
- Production company: Frames Production

Original release
- Network: Star Pravah
- Release: 12 January 2020 – 7 July 2024

Mi Honar Superstar (transl. I Will Be a Superstar) is an Indian Marathi language television reality show which aired on Star Pravah. It premiered from 12 January 2020 airing every weekend. The show aired 5 seasons of Dance and Singing genre for adult and juniors with 4 Me Honar Superstar – Chhote Ustad singing seasons specially for little masters.

== Host ==
=== Season 1 and Aawaz Kunacha Maharashtracha ===
- Pushkar Shrotri

=== Jallosh Dancecha and Juniorscha, Jodi Number 1 ===
- Sanskruti Balgude
- Samrudhhi Kelkar
- Saisha Salvi

== Judges ==
=== Season 1 and Aawaz Kunacha Maharashtracha ===
- Adarsh Shinde
- Saleel Kulkarni
- Mrinal Kulkarni
- Bela Shende
- Rahul Deshpande

=== Jallosh Dancecha and Juniorscha, Jodi Number 1 ===
- Ankush Chaudhari
- Kruti Mahesh
- Phulwa Khamkar
- Vaibhav Ghuge

== Seasons ==
Season	Originally broadcast		Name
Season	First aired	Last aired	Name
1	12 January 2020	22 March 2020	Me Honar Superstar
2	21 August 2021	28 November 2021	Jallosh Dancecha
3	14 May 2022	21 August 2022	Aawaz Kunacha Maharashtracha
4	18 February 2023	4 June 2023	Jallosh Juniorscha
5	9 March 2024	7 July 2024	Jodi Number 1
