= Pathlaag =

1964 film by Raja Paranjape

- DVD cover
- Directed by: Raja Paranjape
- Screenplay by: G. D. Madgulkar
- Based on: Asha Parat Yete by Jayant Deokule
- Produced by: Raja Paranjape
- Starring: Kashinath Ghanekar; Bhavana
- Cinematography: Datta Gorle
- Music by: Datta Davjekar
- Production company: Shripad Chitra
- Release date: 1964
- Running time: 123 minutes
- Country: India
- Language: Marathi

Pathlaag (transl. The Chase) is a 1964 Indian Marathi-language thriller film produced and directed by Raja Paranjape. It is an adaptation of the Jayant Deokule novel Asha Parat Yete (Asha comes back). The film stars Kashinath Ghanekar and Bhavana. It was a commercial success, and won the National Film Award for Best Feature Film in Marathi and Maharashtra State Film Award for Best Actor for Ghanekar. The film was later remade in Tamil as Idhaya Kamalam (1965) and in Hindi as Mera Saaya (1966).

== Plot ==
When Balasaheb Panse, a renowned Indian lawyer goes abroad, he receives a telegram informing him of the sudden death of his wife Asha. After she has been cremated and he is still in mourning, a woman arrested as a member of a criminal gang by the police claims to be Asha. She keeps telling Panse intimate details about their lives, expresses surprise that anyone could have thought her dead and implores him to have her released, causing a major emotional dilemma for Panse. Eventually, the second woman is revealed as indeed his wife, while the woman who died was her hitherto unmentioned twin sister.

== Cast ==
- Kashinath Ghanekar as Balasaheb Panse
- Bhavana as Asha and Nisha/Raina

== Production ==
Pathlaag is based on Jayant Deokule's novel Asha Parat Yete. It was produced and directed by Raja Paranjape under Shripad Chitra, and the screenplay was written by G. D. Madgulkar. The cinematography was handled by Datta Gorle. Kashinath Ghanekar and Bhavana made their acting debuts with this film.

== Soundtrack ==
The music was composed by Datta Davjekar, and screenwriter Madgulkar also served as lyricist. There are only two songs in the film: "Ya Dolyanchi Don Pakhare" and "Nako Marus Hak", both sung by Asha Bhosle. The former attained popularity.

== Release and reception ==
Pathlaag became a commercial success, and won the National Film Award for Best Feature Film in Marathi. The film was later remade in Tamil as Idhaya Kamalam (1965) and in Hindi as Mera Saaya (1966). Despite its success, Pathlaag failed to set a trend of more detective films being made in Marathi.

== Bibliography ==
- Rajadhyaksha, Ashish; Willemen, Paul (1998) [1994]. Encyclopaedia of Indian Cinema. British Film Institute and Oxford University Press. ISBN 0-19-563579-5.
