= Chhatriwali (film) =

2023 film by Tejas Prabha Vijay Deoskar

- Official release poster
- Directed by: Tejas Prabha Vijay Deoskar
- Written by: Sanchit Gupta; Priyadarshee Srivastava
- Produced by: Ronnie Screwvala
- Starring: Rakul Preet Singh; Sumeet Vyas; Satish Kaushik; Rajesh Tailang; Dolly Ahluwalia
- Cinematography: Siddharth Vasani
- Edited by: Shruti Bora
- Music by: Score: Mangesh Dhakde; Rohan-Rohan; Songs: Akhil Sachdeva; Rohan-Rohan; Sumeet Bellary; Durgesh R Rajbhatt
- Production company: RSVP Movies
- Distributed by: ZEE5
- Release date: 20 January 2023
- Running time: 116 minutes
- Country: India
- Language: Hindi

Chhatriwali (transl. woman with umbrella) is a 2023 Indian Hindi-language social comedy film directed by Tejas Prabha Vijay Deoskar and produced by Ronnie Screwvala. The film stars Rakul Preet Singh, Sumeet Vyas, Satish Kaushik, Dolly Ahluwalia and Rajesh Tailang. The film premiered on 20 January 2023 on ZEE5. The film aims to promote the importance of male contraceptives and safe sex. It marked the last film of Satish Kaushik before his death on 9 March 2023, while he was alive.

== Plot ==
Set in Karnal, Sanya Dhingra is an unemployed chemistry genius who makes a living by taking Chemistry tuitions. She is on the lookout for a job but gets rejected everytime. One day, while flying kites, she chances upon Ratan Lamba, the owner of Cando Condoms. He is impressed by Sanya's knowledge and proposes a job offer as the Quality Control Head at his factory. Though initially hesitant about the nature of the job, Sanya agrees to work for him for a salary of 50,000 Rs. under the condition that he does not disclose to anyone that she works at a condom factory. In exchange, Lamba makes a demand that she signs a contract to work for a year before quitting. She agrees and hides her true job from her family, telling them that she works at an umbrella factory, due to fear of being ridiculed.

At a friend's engagement, she has a brief encounter with Rishi, who is engaged in a business of selling Puja items and deity figures. Over time, the duo fall in love and their marriage gets fixed. Sanya hides her true job from Rishi and his family due to their highly religious background and confides in her sister about the same. One day, Nisha, her sister-in-law, collapses in the kitchen. Upon taking her to the doctor, she learns that Nisha has had two abortions and two miscarriages in the past, and her body had gotten weak over continuously consuming birth-control pills. Sanya confronts Nisha about not using condoms during sex, who in turn tells her how much Rajan, despite being a Biology teacher, despises it due to religious beliefs.

This prompts Sanya to coerce Rishi into using condoms who initially hesitant, finally yields. Sanya conveys to Nisha that Rishi has agreed to use condoms and encourages her to ask Rajan to do the same. Nisha tells Sanya that she would only talk about this to Rajan if all the women in Karnal forced their husbands to use condoms. Sanya arranges a meeting with the women of Karnal and makes them aware about the side-effects of pills, and ask them to force their husbands to use condoms. This proves successful. An increasing number of men turn up at Madan Chacha's store to buy condoms, who believes that condoms are a disgraceful thing. Upon Madan Chacha's insistence, the men decide to avoid their wives' advances in hopes they would finally agree to sex without condoms. Their plan works. An enraged menfolk storm the Kalra's household holding a newspaper with an article showing Sanya being the first condom quality tester of Karnal. This breaks Sanya's lie to all in the house and Rajan orders Sanya to choose between her marriage or her job. Sanya insists that her work is for a noble cause and chooses to leave the house. She decides to tackle the problem head-on from the root.

She sets up a shed outside the school in which Rajan teaches hoping to provide sex-education to students, who are otherwise shied away from the topic by Rajan, who opted to segregate both genders into different classes to teach the topic. Her plan sees some success as a considerable number of students turn up at her shed to get their doubts cleared on the same. Rajan calls the cops on her who arrest her for indecency. Rishi sees this and bails her out against his brother's wish. Rishi apologises to Sanya and informs her about his support in her fight. They set up classes at the Kalra's household for students with the support of everyone except Rajan. Rajan tries to stop the classes but Nisha and Mini stand up to him. Rajan understands his mistake and apologises to Sanya further proclaiming his support for her.

== Cast ==
- Rakul Preet Singh as Sanya Dhingra
- Sumeet Vyas as Rishi Kalra, Sanya's husband
- Satish Kaushik as Ratan Lamba, Sanya's employer
- Dolly Ahluwalia as Dhingra Aunty
- Rajesh Tailang as Rajan Kalra / Bhai Ji (Sanya's brother-in-law)
- Prachee Shah Paandya as Nisha Kalra
- Rakesh Bedi as Madan Chacha
- Riva Arora as Mini Kalra

== Production ==
The shoot of the film started soon in November 2021. It was mostly shot in Lucknow, Uttar Pradesh. The shoots were wrapped by December 2021.

== Critical reception ==
The film received mixed to positive reviews from critics.

Archika Khurana of The Times of India rated the film 3 out of 5 stars and concluded it "could have been packaged and delivered more creatively and uniquely," but was still "watchable". Bollywood Hungama gave the film 3 out of 5 stars. Similarly, Phelian of The Quint rated the film 3/5, and described it as "Lackluster, despite earnest and crucial messaging"

In rating the film 2.5/5, India Today critic Anindita Mukherjee wrote that it "tends to get preachy in parts," but "is a decent weekend watch." In her review for Hindustan Times, Monika Rawal Kukreja wrote, "There are some flaws here and there, but with all the humour and lighter moments, they can be somewhat overlooked."

Shubhra Gupta of The Indian Express was far more critical in her review. Rating the film 1.5 out of 5 stars, she wrote, "Rakul Preet Singh has delivered a perky performance in a film hamstrung by a script that is afraid to fully embrace its message."

== Soundtrack ==
Chhatriwali

Soundtrack album by Akhil Sachdeva, Rohan-Rohan, Sumeet Bellary and Durgesh R Rajbhatt
- Released: 13 January 2023
- Genre: Feature film soundtrack
- Length: 14:25
- Language: Hindi
- Label: Zee Music Company

Official audio
- Chhatriwali - Full Album on YouTube

The music for the film composed by Akhil Sachdeva, Rohan-Rohan, Sumeet Bellary and Durgesh R Rajbhatt. Lyrics are written by Tejas Prabha, Vijay Deoskar, Akhil Sachdeva, Satya Khare and Saaveri Verma.

No.	Title	Lyrics	Music	Singer(S)	Length
1.	"Chhatriwali (Title Track)"	Tejas Prabha, Vijay Deoskar	Rohan-Rohan	Sunidhi Chauhan	2:42
2.	"Main Teri Hi Rahoon"	Akhil Sachdeva	Akhil Sachdeva	Akhil Sachdeva, Shirley Setia	4:26
3.	"Special Edition Kudi"	Satya Khare	Sumeet Bellary	Sunidhi Chauhan, Gandhharv Sachdeva	3:12
4.	"Toot Hi Gaya"	Saaveri Verma	Durgesh R Rajbhatt	Himani Kapoor, Durgesh R Rajbhatt	4:05
Total length:					14:25
