= Aaj Aur Kal (1963 film) =

- Poster
- Directed by: Vasant Joglekar
- Written by: P L Deshpande; Akhtar-Ul-Iman (dialogues)
- Produced by: Vasant Joglekar; Panchadeep Chitra
- Starring: Sunil Dutt; Ashok Kumar; Nanda; Tanuja
- Cinematography: Bal M. Jogalekar
- Edited by: Chintamani Borkar
- Music by: Ravi
- Distributed by: Shemaroo Video Pvt. Ltd. (2004) DVD
- Release date: 1963
- Country: India
- Language: Hindi

Aaj Aur Kal (transl. Today and tomorrow) is a 1963 Indian Hindi-language film produced and directed by Vasant Joglekar, based on the Marathi book and play 'Sundar mi honar' (I will become beautiful) by author P.L.Deshpande (Pu.la.Deshpande).

The film stars Sunil Dutt, Nanda, Tanuja, Ashok Kumar and Deven Verma. The film was a box office success. It was given a U certificate and re-certified with the same rating after 9 cuts by the censor board in 1981.

== Plot ==
It is the story of a fastidious king Balbir Singh of Himmatpur, whose stern, high handed behaviour leads to a breakdown in communication with his four children; eldest daughter Hemalata, younger daughter Ashalata and sons Pratap and Rajendra. His intimidating commands lead to partial paralysis of Hemlata's lower limbs and also a simmering discontent amongst other descendants. After numerous attempts fail to cure Hemalata, the king hires a new doctor, Sanjay, who contrary to expectations, is not just young and handsome, but also against silly protocols that hamper laughter, fun and frolic. Dr. Sanjay's experimentations provide greater mobility and joy to the youngsters, giving them a fresh lease of life and a much needed voice of rebellion. Transcending normal barriers of doctor-client confidentiality, Sanjay and Hemalata fall in love and the romance enables her to walk in double quick time on her feet! Initially reluctant, the king awakens to a new dawn of freedom and humbly accepts not just their relationship, but also Ashalata's betrothal to social activist, who defeats him in a general election.

== Cast ==
- Ashok Kumar as Maharaja Balvir Singh
- Sunil Dutt as Dr. Sanjay
- Nanda as Rajkumari Hemlata "Hema"
- Tanuja as Rajkumari Ashalata "Asha"
- Deven Verma as Rajendra
- Sudesh Kumar as Ashalata's Friend
- Agha as Rajkumar Dhanak Singh
- Dhumal as Dhanak Singh's Secretary
- Kusum Deshpande as Sister

== Music ==
All lyrics provided by Sahir Ludhianvi and music by Ravi.

Song	Singer
"Yeh Waadiyan, Yeh Fizayen, Bula Rahi Hai"	Mohammed Rafi
"Itni Haseen, Itni Jawan Raat, Kya Kare"	Mohammed Rafi
"Takht Na Hoga, Taj Na Hoga, Kal Tha, Lekin Aaj Na Hoga"	Mohammed Rafi, Manna Dey, Geeta Dutt
"Mujhe Gale Se Laga Lo" (Duet)	Mohammed Rafi, Asha Bhosle
"Mujhe Gale Se Laga Lo" (Solo)	Asha Bhosle
"Mohe Chhedo Na Kanha Bajariya Mein"	Asha Bhosle
"Maut Kitni Bhi Sangdil Ho"	Asha Bhosle
"Ba-Adab, Ba-Mulahisa, Hoshiyar"	Asha Bhosle, Mahendra Kapoor
"Kehte Hai Jisko Ishq, Tabiyat Ki Baat Hai"	Shamshad Begum, Usha Mangeshkar

Two songs are set in Hindustani ragas: "Mujhe Gale Se Laga Lo" (both versions, Asavari) and "Yeh Waadiyan, Yeh Fizayen, Bula Rahi Hai" (Pahadi).
