= Vishnupant Damle (film) =

Vishnupant Damle : The Unsung Hero Of Talkies
- Directed by: Virendra Valsangkar
- Produced by: M/s A. V . Damle
- Starring: Hrishikesh Joshi; Nachiket Purnapatre; Ashwini Giri; Nitin Dhanduke; Prashant Tapasvi; Rajesh Pathak
- Cinematography: Ashu Solanki
- Music by: Kedar Divekar
- Release date: 2011
- Country: India
- Language: Marathi

Vishnupant Damle : The Unsung Hero Of Talkies Is a national award-winning docudrama about life of Shri Vishnupant Damle – one of the founder members of the legendary Prabhat Film Company. V G Damle started his journey as a poor village boy and became a remarkable personality in the film history of India. In the early 19th century, he has worked as an art director, cameraman, sound recordist, producer and director, for many acclaimed films.

The film won award for best biographical/historical reconstruction at the 59th National Films Awards.

The film follows his life journey as well as his contribution to the world of cinema.

== About ==
This docudrama highlights V G Damle's contribution to films. The docu-drama traces Damle's journey, starting as a young artiste who steadily went on to learn and master art direction, sound recording and film direction under able hands, and the film projects he handled with other company co-founders like S Fatehlal. It also throws light on some of the most important films he did that leveraged Indian cinema, for instance, 'Sant Tukaram' and 'Sant Dnyaneshwar,' among others. The Prabhat Film Company itself stood on the present-day premises of the Film and television Institute if India

The film uses pictures, information and other data from various sources. The project consciously focuses on V G Damle's career, his creative contributions and his life. Along with his journey the film portrays The story of Prabhat, simultaneously.

== Making ==
The research for this documentary lasted three years, and it took an entire year to complete the shoot of the film. Award-winning film makers like Sumitra Bhave and Sunil Sukhtankar contributed towards the making of this National Award Winning Film.

The film was shot on a high definition camera with an around Rs 10 lakh. Film and Television Institute of India provided the infrastructure and other needed help.

== Festivals and screenings ==
The film was first screened on 23 December at the Asian Film Festival in Kolhapur and also at the Pune International Film Festival next year.

The film was also screened at other festivals like 13th Mumbai International Film Festival

The Film was also screened at The Consulate General of India, New York It was the first in a series of events at the Consulate to commemorate 100 years of Indian cinema.

== Awards ==
The film won award for best biographical/historical reconstruction at the 59th National Film Awards.
SPECIAL JURY MENTION at the 10th IDPA Awards for Excellence
