= Bucket List (2018 film) =

- Directed by: Tejas Prabha Vijay Deoskar
- Screenplay by: Tejas Prabha Vijay Deoskar; Devashree Shivadekar
- Story by: Tejas Prabha Vijay Deoskar
- Produced by: Jamashp Bapuna; Amit Pankaj Parikh; Arun Rangachari; Vivek Rangachari; Aarti Subhedar; Ashok Subhedar
- Starring: Madhuri Dixit; Sumedh Mudgalkar; Sumeet Raghavan; Vandana Gupte; Renuka Shahane; Ritika Shrotri
- Cinematography: Arjun Sorte
- Edited by: Abhijeet Balaji Deshpande
- Music by: Rohan-Rohan
- Production companies: Dark Horse Cinemas; DAR Motion Pictures; Blue Mustang Creations
- Distributed by: Dharma Productions; AA Films
- Release date: 25 May 2018
- Running time: 130 minutes
- Country: India
- Language: Marathi
- Box office: est.₹6−12 crore

Bucket List is a 2018 Indian Marathi-language comedy drama film directed by Tejas Prabha Vijay Deoskar. Jointly produced by DAR Motion Pictures, Dark Horse Cinemas and Blue Mustang Creations, the film stars Madhuri Dixit in her Marathi debut, along with Renuka Shahane and Sumeet Raghavan. It was released on 25 May 2018.

On 29 November 2018, Dixit announced the streaming of the film on Netflix through her Instagram account.

== Plot ==
The film begins with dedicated housewife Madhura (Madhuri Dixit) cooking a custom-made meal for each of her family members (husband Mohan (Sumeet Raghavan), daughter, son, in-laws, and grandmother-in-law). She is clearly shown to have dedicated her entire existence to keeping her family happy, from sunrise to sunset. It is revealed that Madhura received a heart transplant a few months ago, and she traces the donor to a 20-year-old girl called Sai. Madhura feels obliged to show her gratitude and visits Sai's parents (played by Renuka Shahane and Milind Phatak) and her twin brother, Salil (Sumedh Mudgalkar) at their home.

Sai's family is caught off guard, but receives her amicably, except for Salil. She discovers that Sai had voluntarily signed up to be an organ donor, and encouraged her friends to do so too (Sai's cause of death is shown as a truck accident in the newspaper). Madhura is touched and inspired by the young girl's profound thoughts. She decides to attend Sai's college reunion, which Sai had planned to go to, and learns more about Sai from her friends there. She discovers that Sai had a 'bucket list' - a list of things she intended to complete before her 21st birthday, but died before being able to do so. Madhura immediately decides to fulfill Sai's wishes by completing the list itself. What begins as a heart-warming journey of Harley motorbike races and disco nights evolves into a whole new voyage of self-rediscovery for Madhura.

== Cast ==
- Madhuri Dixit as Madhura Sane
- Sumeet Raghavan as Mohan Sane
- Vandana Gupte as Aai (Madhura's mother-in-law)
- Pradeep Velankar as Baba (Madhura's father-in-law)
- Shubha Khote as Panji
- Dilip Prabhavalkar as Madhura's father
- Ila Bhate as Madhura's mother
- Renuka Shahane as Mrs. Deshpande (Sai's mother)
- Milind Phatak as Mr. Deshpande (Sai's father)
- Sumedh Mudgalkar as Salil Deshpande (Sai's twin brother)
- Krutika Deo as Riya
- Resham Tipnis as Lavina Mavera
- Shalv Kinjawadekar as Adi
- Ritika Shrotri as Radhika Sane
- Atharva Bedekar as Neil Sane
- Ranbir Kapoor (Cameo Appearance)
- Shishir Sharma as surgeon in hospital (special appearance)

== Soundtrack ==
Bucket List

Soundtrack album by Rohan-Rohan
- Released: 17 May 2018
- Genre: Feature film soundtrack
- Length: 14:59
- Language: Marathi
- Label: Zee Music Company

Rohan-Rohan chronology
Ventilator (2016)	Bucket List (2018)	Sanju (2018)
External audio
- Audio Jukebox on YouTube

Singles from Bucket List
- 1. "Houn Jau Dya" Released: 8 May 2018; 2. "Tu Pari" Released: 15 May 2018

The soundtrack of Bucket List consists of three songs composed by Rohan-Rohan, the lyrics of which have been written by Mandar Cholkar and Tejas Prabha Vijay Deoskar.

Track listing
No.	Title	Lyrics	Singer(s)	Length
1.	"Houn Jau Dya"	Mandar Cholkar	Shreya Ghoshal, Sadhana Sargam & Shaan	03:54
2.	"Tu Pari"	Mandar Cholkar	Shreya Ghoshal & Rohan Pradhan	05:59
3.	"Majhya Mana"	Tejas Prabha Vijay Deoskar	Rohan Pradhan	05:06
Total length:				14:59

== Reception ==
=== Box office ===
Bucket List was released in 409 screens in India and opened to pretty decent collections at the box office. It collected ₹0.96 crore (US$100,000) on the opening day and ₹3.66 crore (US$390,000) in its opening weekend.

=== Critical response ===
Mihir Bhanage of The Times of India said that the film doesn't have anything more to offer than what the trailer had already revealed but praised the performance of Madhuri Dixit saying that, "Madhuri owns the film and sails through it with flying colours." and gave the film a rating of 3 out of 5. Kunal Guha of Mumbai Mirror gave the film a rating of 2.5 out of 5 saying that, "Madhuri Dixit long-overdue debut in Marathi cinema is a comfort watch even if a tad predictable and sappy." Kennith Rosario of The Hindu reviewed the film saying that, "Though a well-intentioned film, Bucket List is repetitive and often hammers its message to a point of sheer boredom." Johnson Thomas of Free Press Journal gave the film a rating of 3 out of 5 and said that, "The narrative is more interested in presenting the diva in sparkling form than in telling a plausible story. So it’s entirely Madhuri’s show, so-to-speak!". Snehil Sharma of Humaribaat online portal gave 4 out of 5, he further explains "Overall film is joyful and entertaining in all respect".

Prasanna D Zore of Rediff said that, "Madhuri's Bucket List isn't as endearing as her" and gave the film a rating of 2.5 out of 5. Devansh Sharma of First Post gave the film a rating of 3 out of 5 and praised Madhuri Dixit's performance but found the screenplay of the film to be weak specially in the second half of the film. Suhani Singh of India Today praised the funny moments of the film and the acting performances of Madhuri Dixit and Shubha Khote but criticized the "holier-than-thou image" of Madhura [the character played by Madhuri Dixit] as it wasn't quite believable. Suhani gave the film a rating of 2 out of 5. Abhay Salvi of Marathi Stars gave the film a rating of 2.5 out of 5 saying that, "Bucket List’s biggest problem is the directorial decision making, from the tone of the film to the overall flow of the screenplay, the inclusion of irrelevant drama & the absurd climax."

== See also ==
- The Bucket List, a 2007 American comedy drama film
