= Ani... Dr. Kashinath Ghanekar =

2018 Marathi-language biographical film

- Theatrical release poster
- Directed by: Abhijeet Deshpande
- Written by: Abhijeet Shirish Deshpande
- Based on: Kashinath Ghanekar
- Produced by: Viacom18 Motion Pictures; Shree Ganesh Marketing & Films
- Starring: Subodh Bhave; Vaidehi Parashurami; Sonali Kulkarni; Sumeet Raghavan; Prasad Oak
- Edited by: Apurva Motiwale; Ashish Mhatre
- Music by: Rohan-Rohan; Ajit Parab
- Release date: 8 November 2018
- Country: India
- Language: Marathi
- Box office: ₹16 crore

Ani... Dr. Kashinath Ghanekar (transl. And...Dr. Kashinath Ghanekar) is a 2018 Indian Marathi biographical drama film directed and written by Abhijeet Deshpande. The film follows the life of Marathi film actor Kashinath Ghanekar. It was jointly produced by Sunil Phadtare under the Shree Ganesh Marketing & Films with Viacom18 Motion Pictures. Subodh Bhave played the role of Kashinath Ghanekar, with Sonali Kulkarni, Vaidehi Parshurami, Sumeet Raghavan and Nandita Patkar in supporting roles.

== Plot ==
Dr. Kashinath Ghanekar, who is a dental surgeon from Bombay (Mumbai), decides to pursue acting. Despite facing various personal and professional hurdles. Kashinath was the first superstar of Marathi Theatre. Most notable character is "Lalya" in the Ashroonchi Zhali Phule which was played by him.

== Cast ==
- Subodh Bhave as Kashinath Ghanekar
- Vaidehi Parshurami as Kanchan Ghanekar
- Sonali Kulkarni as Sulochana Latkar
- Sumeet Raghavan as Shreeram Lagoo
- Mohan Joshi as Bhalji Pendharkar
- Prasad Oak as Prabhakar Panshikar
- Anand Ingle as Vasant Kanetkar
- Nandita Patkar as Dr. Irawati Bhide Ghanekar
- Suhas Palshikar as Master Dattaram
- Swapnil Rajshekhar as Mohan
- Suved Kulkarni as Dinkar Phule
- Nandkishor Choughule as Kashinath's manager
- Madhav Apte as Chittaranjan Kolhatkar
- Paritosh Pradhan as Raja Paranjape

=== Special Appearance ===
- Pradeep Velankar as Kashinath's father
- Amruta Khanvilkar as Sandhya Shantaram (Chandrakala)
- Prajakta Mali as Asha Kale (special appearance in "Gomu Sangtina" song)

== Production ==
=== Casting ===
Actor Subodh Bhave was Abhijeet's first choice to play Ghanekar's character. Abhijeet stated, "When I knew that there is so much Complexity in the character and the story, I wanted an actor who can project all those different shades of the same person! So, I first thought Subodh and went straight to him."

=== Characters ===
Vaidehi Parashurami was cast as Kanchantai Ghanekar second wife of Kashinath Ghanekar. Sonali Kulkarni approached for role of Sulochana Latkar. Amruta Khanvilkar and Prajakta Mali were next cast in supporting roles. While it was known that Amruta would play the role of Actress Sandhya Shantaram whereas Prajakta played the role of well-known Marathi actress Asha Kale.

== Soundtrack ==
Ani... Dr. Kashinath Ghanekar

Soundtrack album by Rohan-Rohan, Ajit Parab
- Released: 2018
- Recorded: 2018
- Genre: Feature Film Soundtrack
- Language: Marathi
- Label: Saregama Marathi
External audio
- Audio jukebox on YouTube

The songs were composed by Rohan-Rohan & Ajit Parab while the lyrics are written by Guru Thakur and Sachin Phatak. The soundtrack album was released in 2018.

The song "Gomu Sangtina" and "Tumhavar" originally composed by Hridaynath Mangeshkar and Ram Kadam respectively, sung by Hemant Kumar, Asha Bhosle & Usha Mangeshkar respectively.

Track listing
No.	Title	Lyrics	Music	Singer(s)	Length
1.	"Gomu Sangtina"	Sudhir Moghe	Hridaynath Mangeshkar	Hemant Kumar, Asha Bhosle	3:27
2.	"Indradhanu"	Guru Thakur	Ajit Parab	Sharayu Date	4:11
3.	"Lalya"	Sachin Phatak	Rohan-Rohan	Nakash Aziz	4:01
4.	"Tumhavar"	Jagdish Khebudkar	Ram Kadam	Usha Mangeshkar	3:23

== Release and reception ==
The film released in India on 8 November 2018 and in the United States 9 November 2018. The satellite rights were sold to Colors Marathi and Shemaroo MarathiBana.

=== Critical reception ===
Upon release, the film received positive reviews from critics. Ganesh Matkari from Pune Mirror gave it 3.5 out of 5 stars, concluding that, "Fantastic acting by all is an icing on the cake in this gripping story of Marathi Stage Superstar. The film keeps you involved till end is in itself is a great success of the film."

The Times of India gave it 3.5 stars out of 5, concluding, "The mention of Kashinath Ghanekar would bring Bhave's image in front of the eyes. All in all, the film is worth a watch."

=== Box office ===
Ani... Dr. Kashinath Ghanekar opened on a strong note at the box office. It collected around ₹10.40 crore (US$1.1 million) at the Box office in the first week. The extremely positive word of mouth helped the movie to hold strong even in second week by collecting ₹5.50 crore (US$590,000) in the second weekend, taking the total to ₹15.90 crore (US$1.7 million) in 10 days.
