= Cycle (2018 film) =

Cycle (Marathi Film)
- Directed by: Prakash Kunte
- Screenplay by: Aditi Moghe
- Story by: Aditi Moghe
- Produced by: Sangram Surve; Amar Pandit
- Starring: Hrishikesh Joshi; Bhalchandra Kadam; Priyadarshan Jadhav
- Cinematography: Amalendu Chaudhary
- Music by: Aditya Bedekar
- Production company: Happy Mind Entertainment Pvt. Ltd.
- Release date: 2018
- Country: India
- Language: Marathi

Cycle (Marathi: सायकल) is a 2018 Marathi film directed by Prakash Kunte. The film is produced by Sangram Surve and Amar Pandit and written by Aditi Moghe. The original soundtrack has been composed by Aditya Bedekar.

== Synopsis ==
Keshav is a well-known astrologer who lives with his father, wife and daughter. Keshav's grandfather had obtained a yellow bicycle from an Englishman and had bequeathed it to his grandson prior to his death. Keshav is possessive of his cycle, and the only one who he lets ride it is his daughter. One day, his daughter wonders whether the cycle might get bored of being locked up every night and fly away. Another night, Keshav leaves his cycle outside his house in a rush to attend a play. Two thieves who had looted a nearby mansion, steal his cycle to escape quickly. Keshav's distress renders him unable to give any astrological advice. He sets out in search of his cycle.

As the thieves pass through nearby villages, people instantly recognize the yellow cycle as Keshav's. The thieves pretend to be Keshav's paternal cousins to deflect probing questions. Keshav's reputation as a helpful person gets them free tea from a vendor, a feast in a home and an invitation to be chief guests in a school event. When the thieves lose their bag of stolen goods, they fear that stealing from a person as trusted as Keshav has brought them bad luck. They leave the cycle in a village with a letter to Keshav detailing their interactions with the people he had helped. Meanwhile, Keshav's own journey brings him to a man who has lost his house but has retained an optimistic outlook, taking strength from Keshav's previously given astrological advice. Keshav reflects on his own attachment to his cycle. When he finds it in the next village, he gives it away. He returns home to find his friends and family claiming to have found his bicycle nearby. He rubs the cycle and finds fresh paint on his fingers. He then smiles, gesturing to his daughter that the cycle has flown away.

== Cast ==
- Hrishikesh Joshi as Keshav, an astrologer
- Bhalchandra Kadam as Gajya, a thief / Vitthal, Keshav's cousin (Fake)
- Priyadarshan Jadhav as Mangya, a thief / Tukaram "Tukya", Keshav's cousin (Fake)
- Deepti Lele as Jayashree, Keshav's wife
- Vidhyadhar Joshi as Savkar
- Abhijeet Chavan as Shyam, Keshav's friend who owns a small restaurant but aspires to become an actor
- Baby Mythili Patwardhan as Mrunmayi, Keshav's daughter
- Manoj Kolhatkar as Keshav's father

== Reception ==
It was one of the three Marathi films sold at the Cannes Film Market in 2017. It won best film, best director and best screenplay awards at the fifth Kolhapur International Film festival. It also won the National Film Award for Best Costume Design.
