= Hrishikesh Joshi =

Indian actor

- Born: Kolhapur, Maharashtra, India
- Occupations: Film, Theater and Television Actor, Writer

Hrishikesh Joshi, born in Kolhapur, is a Marathi actor. He has acted in numerous Hindi, Marathi Movies, tele-serials and theater and has won applauds from many noted professionals. He has acted in award-winning films like Harishchandrachi Factory, Yellow (2014 film), Aajcha Divas Majha, Vishnupant Damle : The Unsung Hero Of Talkies, Deool

Hrishikesh Joshi completed his post graduation from National School of Drama, in 1997 Acted in more than 50 plays in Hindi, Marathi and Sanskrit Represented India for Sri Lankan Theatre Festival in which performed ‘ Abhigyan Shakuntalam’ in Sanskrit in Columbo and Candy.

Best Actor Award from Maharashtra state government for Commercial Play State Competition (1999-2000) for the play Shobhayatra, (2006-2007) for Love story and (2007-2008) for 'Ye Bhau Doka Nako Khau' More than 400 shows for commercial play Mukkampost Bombilwadi More than 150 shows for commercial play Sangeet Lagnakallol. More than 150 shows for commercial play Marathi play Love Story

He also writes for a column in the famous Marathi newspaper, Loksatta

== Filmography ==
=== Films ===
Year	Title	Role	Notes
2026	Super Duperr	Balasaheb Jadhav	
2024	Phullwanti	Pant Chitnis	
2024	Ek Don Teen Chaar	Sameer's father	
2024	Paani Puri		
2023	Teen Adkun Sitaram	Picaso	
2023	Jaggu Ani Juliet		
2022	Bhirkit	Popat	
2017	Cycle	Keshav	
2019	Miss U Mister	Friend of Kaveri's father	
2014	Yellow		At the 61st National Film Awards, it won the Special Jury Award
2014	Aajcha Divas Majha		At the 61st National Film Awards, it won the National Film Award for Best Marathi Film 2014
2014	Poshter Boyz		Zee Chitra Gaurav Puraskar for Best Supporting Actor
2014	Ajoba		
2012	Vishnupant Damle : The Unsung Hero Of Talkies		The film won award for best biographical/historical reconstruction at the 59th National Film Awards
2012	Bhartiya		
2012	Masala		
2011	Deool		The film won the 59th National Film Awards for Best Feature Film
2010	Harishchandrachi Factory		56th National Film Awards: National Film Award for Best Feature Film in Marathi it was selected as India's official entry to Academy Award in the Best Foreign Language Film Category
2010	Atithi Tum Kab Jaoge?		
2009	Kaminey		
	Takkar		
2008	De Dhakka		
	Nirmala Machhindra Kamble		
	Kal Ka Admi		
	Devi Ahilya		
	Agabai Arechya		
	Wrong Mauritius		
	Jagajjanani Mahalaxmi		
2000	Dr. Babasaheb Ambedkar		The film won three National Film Awards (India) in 1999.: Best feature film in English; Best Actor - Mammootty; Best Art Direction - Nitin Chandrakant Desai
	Nishani Daava Angtha		
1986	Sutradhar		

=== Marathi Serials ===
Title	Role	TV Channel	Notes
Ghadlay Bighadlay		Alpha Marathi	
Shi. Gangadhar Tipare		Alpha Marathi	
Hasa Chakat fu		Alpha Marathi	
Spandan		Alpha Marathi	
Eka Lagnachi Dusri Gosht		Zee Marathi	
Bigg Boss Marathi 1	Himself	Colors Marathi	Guest

== Awards ==
- Best Actor Award from Maharashtra state government for Commercial Play State Competition (1999-2000) for Shobhayatra
- Best Actor Award from Maharashtra state government for Commercial Play State Competition (2006-2007) for Love story
- Best Actor Award from Maharashtra state government for Commercial Play State Competition (2007-2008) for Ey bhau doka nako khau
