= List of Marathi films of 1988 =

A list of films produced by the Marathi-language film industry based in Maharashtra in the year 1988.

== 1988 Releases ==
A list of Marathi films released in 1988.

- Mala Ghevun Chala
  - Director: Dada Kondke
  - Producer: Vijay Kondke
  - Cast: Dada Kondke
- Bandiwan Mi Ya Sansari
  - Director: Arun Vasudev Karnatki
  - Cast: Leela Gandhi, Asha Kale, Mohan Kotwan
  - Release Date: 30 December 1988 (Maharashtra)
  - Distributor: Everest Entertainment
- Majjach Majja
  - Director: Satish Ranadive
  - Cast: Laxmikant Berde, Nilu Phule, Varsha Usgaonkar
- Nashibwan
  - Director: N. S. Vaidya
  - Producers: Arvind Khanolkar, Annasaheb Deulgaonkar
  - Cast: Nitish Bharadwaj
- Maza Pati Karodpati
  - Director: Sachin Pilgaonkar
  - Producers: Chelaram Bhatia, Lalchand Bhatia
  - Cast: Sachin Pilgaonkar, Supriya Pilgaonkar, Ashok Saraf, Kishori Shahane, Nilu Phule, Shubha Khote, Jairam Kulkarni, Suhas Bhalekar, Macchindra Kambli
  - Release Date: 20 January 1988 (Maharashtra)
  - Distributor: Everest Entertainment
- Rangat Sangat
  - Director: Girish Ghanekar
  - Cast: Laxmikant Berde, Ramesh Bhatkar, Archana Joglekar
- Kiss Bai Kiss
  - Director: Murlidhar Kapdi
  - Cast: Laxmikant Berde, Ashwini Bhave, Sudhir Joshi
- Gauracha Navra
  - Director: Usha Chavan
  - Cast: Usha Chavan, Savita Prabhune, Kuldeep Pawar, Ramesh Tilekar, Laxmikant Berde, Narendra Dongre, Sharad Talwalkar
- Aai Pahije
  - Director: Kamalakar Torne
  - Cast: Sadashiv Amrapurkar, Mandakini Badbade, Laxmikant Berde
  - Studio: Shri Chintamani Chitra
- Ashi Hi Banwa Banwi
  - Director: Sachin Pilgaonkar
  - Producer: Vasant Sabnis
  - Cast: Ashok Saraf, Sachin Pilgaonkar, Laxmikant Berde, Siddharth Ray, Ashwini Bhave, Supriya Pilgaonkar, Priya Arun Berde, Nivedita Joshi Saraf, Nayantara, Sudhir Joshi, Viju Khote
  - Release Date: 23 September 1988 (Maharashtra)
  - Studio: V. Shantaram Productions
