= List of Marathi films of 1979 =

A list of films produced by the Marathi language film industry based in Maharashtra in the year 1979.

== 1979 Releases ==
A list of Marathi films released in 1979.

Year	Film	Director	Cast	Release Date	Producer	Notes	Source
1979	22 June 1897	Jayu Patwardhan, Nachiket Patwardhan	Sadashiv Amrapurkar, Udayan Dixit, Prabhakar Patankar		Sanket	Dubbed in Hindi with same name	
1979	Aaitya Bilavar Nagoba	Murlidhar Kapdi	Yashvant Dutt, Nilu Phule, Asha Kale-Naik, Nargis Banu, Master Bhagwan, Sanjivani Bhosle				
1979	Aapali Manase	V. K. Naik					
1979	Ashtavinayak	Rajdutt	Sachin, Vandana Pandit, Sharad Talwalkar, Vasantrao Deshpande, Raja Gosavi				
1979	Sinhasan	Dr. Jabbar Patel	Arun Sarnaik, Nilu Phule, Dr Mohan Agashe, Reema Lagoo, Nana Patekar			National Film Award for Best Feature Film in Marathi in 1979.	
1979	Baeelveda	Prabhakar Naik					
1979	Duniya Kari Salaam	Anant Mane	Ashok Saraf, Ravindra Mahajani, Ramesh Bhatkar				
1979	Tikhat Mirchi Ghata Varchi	Arun Vasudev Karnatki					
1979	Mama Bhache	Datta Mane					
1979	Deed Shahane	Raja Bargir					
1979	Haldikunku	Anant Mane	Ashok Saraf, Ravindra Mahajani, Ranjana				
1979	Chimanrao Gundyabhau	Vinay Dhumale	Mohan Gokhale, Sushma Tendulkar, Dilip Prabhawalkar		Aditya Chitra		
1979	Janki	Vasant Joglekar					
1979	Sunbai Oti Bharun Ja	Dinkar D. Patil	Usha Chavan, Chandrakant Madre, Avinash Masurekar	10 April 1979 (India)	Everest Entertainment		
