= List of Marathi films of 1972 =

A list of films produced by the Marathi language film industry based in Maharashtra in the year 1972.

== 1972 Releases ==
A list of Marathi films released in 1972.

Year	Film	Director	Cast	Release date	Producer	Notes	Source
1972	Aai Mi Kuthee Jau ?	A. Shamsheer					
1972	Kunku Mazhe Bhagyache	Dinkar D. Patil					
1972	Pinjara	V. Shantaram	Dr. Shriram Lagoo, Sandhya, Nilu Phule, Vatsala Deshmukh, Bhalchandra Kulkarni,		V. Shantaram	National Film Award for Best Feature Film in Marathi in 1972. Dubbed in Hindi with same name.	
1972	Paathrakhin	Prabhakar Naik					
1972	Ekta Jeev Sadashiv	Govind Kulkarni	Dada Kondke, Ratnamala, Usha Chavan		Dada Kondke	It was remade in Hindi as Jis Desh Mein Ganga Rehta Hain which was released in 2000.	
1972	Soon Ladki Hya Gharchi	Yashwant Pethkar	Suryakant, Jayshree Gadkar, Dada Salvi				
