= List of Marathi films of 1978 =

A list of films produced by the Marathi language film industry based in Maharashtra in the year 1978.

== 1978 Releases ==
A list of Marathi films released in 1978.

Year	Film	Director	Cast	Release date	Producer	Notes	Source
1978	Bhairu Pahilwan Ki Jai	Kamalakar Vishnu Torne	Yashwant Dutt, Usha Chavan, Arun Sarnaik, Ratnamala, Usha Naik				
1978	Chandaal Chowkadi	Shankar Patil	Usha Chavan, Nilu Phule, Yashwant Bhalkar	10 Jul 1978			
1978	Bot Lavin Tithe Gudgulya	Dada Kondke	Dada Kondke		Dada Kondke		
1978	Sarvasakshi	Ramdas Phutane	Smita Patil, Jairam Kulkarni, Anjali Paigaonkar		Giriraj Pictures		
1978	Kalavantin	Anant Mane	Avinash Masurekar, Usha Chavan, Kuldeep Pawar	28 October 1978 (India)	Everest Entertainment		
1978	Lakshmi	Anant Mane					
1978	Chandra Hota Sakshila	Rajdutt					
1978	Dhakti Mehuni	Datta Dharmadhikari					
1978	Sushila	Anant Mane	Avinash Masurekar, Ranjana, Ashok Saraf				
1978	Sasurvasheen	Babasaheb S. Fattelal	Asha Kale, Lalita Pawar, Nilu Phule				
