= Hyoch Navra Pahije =

1980 Indian film

- Directed by: Dada Kondke
- Written by: Rajesh Majumdar
- Produced by: Dada Kondke
- Starring: Dada Kondke; Jayshree T.
- Cinematography: Arvind Lad
- Edited by: N. S. Vaidya
- Music by: Raamlaxman
- Production company: Dada Kondke Productions
- Release date: 23 May 1980
- Running time: 155 minutes
- Country: India
- Language: Marathi

Hyoch Navra Pahije (transl. I want this husband) is a 1980 Indian Marathi-language comedy film directed and produced by Dada Kondke under the banner of Dada Kondke Productions. The film's story, screenplay and dialogues were written by Rajesh Majumdar. The film starring an ensemble cast of Dada Kondke, Jayshree T., Ratnamala, Sharad Talwalkar, Bhagwan Dada and Asha Patil. The film was released on 23 May 1980.

== Plot ==
The villagers, thoroughly exhausted by the continuous mischief of a young man named Gopal (Gopya), approach the local church priest to lodge complaints against him. Hoping to curb his wayward behavior, the priest advises Gopal that he should settle down and get married. However, Gopal refuses, explaining that a family fortune teller prophesied his father would die the moment he enters into matrimony.

In contrast, Gopal's stepmother treats him as her own biological son and deeply desires to see him married. Amidst these conflicting household dynamics, Gopal meets Gopi, and the two immediately experience a strong mutual attraction. As their relationship develops, Gopal's father steps in to create constant obstacles, actively trying to sabotage their romance and keep them apart.

== Cast ==
- Dada Kondke as Gopal (Gopya)
- Jayshree T. as Gopi
- Ratnamala as Gopya's stepmother
- Dhumal as Gopya's father
- Asha Patil as Masterinbai
- Sharad Talwalkar as Priest
- Bhagwan Dada as Dada
- Madhu Kambikar as Dancer in "Aala Thandicha Mahina"
- Vasant Shinde
- Mohan Kothiwan
- Dinanath Takalkar

== Production ==
The professional friction between veteran director V. Shantaram and Dada Kondke manifested in a notable pair of retaliatory films. Industry chronicles interpreted Shantaram’s 1978 release Asla Navra Nako Ga Bai (Woman, Don't Want Such a Husband) as a subtle critique of Kondke's raw, rustic comedies. Kondke countered with his 1980 film Hyoch Navra Pahije (I Want This Husband). Featuring a title explicitly structured as a direct reply, Kondke's project championed his signature mass-appeal style, marking a legendary chapter of competitive studio politics in Marathi cinema.

== Reception ==
Upon its release on May 23, 1980, film was a commercial success at the box office. The film achieved a theatrical run of 50 weeks.

Following the release of Hyoch Navra Pahije (1980), Kondke met the spiritual teacher Osho after Osho was reportedly informed that a character in the film was intended to parody him. Kondke explained that the scene in question was not intended to portray or satirise Osho, but was based on Sathya Sai Baba and the broader phenomenon of self-styled godmen. Osho reportedly accepted Kondke's explanation, and the meeting ended amicably. Kondke later described the encounter in his book Ekta Jeev as a memorable experience.

== Soundtrack ==
Hyoch Navra Pahije

Soundtrack album by Raamlaxman
- Released: 1980
- Genre: Feature film soundtrack
- Length: 25:19
- Language: Marathi
- Label: Saregama India Limited

Official audio
- Hyoch Navra Pahije- Full Album on YouTube

The movie soundtrack has 6 songs composed by Raamlaxman.

=== Track listing ===
No.	Title	Singer(s)	Length
1	"Kashi Ga Kashi"	Mahendra Kapoor, Usha Mangeshkar	5:03
2	"Aala Thandicha Mahina"	Usha Mangeshkar	3:42
3	"Daulat Hi Teen Lakhanchi"	Mahendra Kapoor, Usha Mangeshkar	4:01
4	"Chal Khel Khelu Dogha"	Mahendra Kapoor, Usha Mangeshkar	3:40
5	"Holicha Sang Gheun"	Asha Bhosle	4:13
6	"Kuni Govind Ghya"	Mahendra Kapoor	4:32
