= List of Marathi films of 1977 =

A list of films produced by the Marathi language film industry based in Maharashtra in the year 1977.

== 1977 Releases ==
A list of Marathi films released in 1977.

Year	Film	Director	Cast	Release Date	Producer	Notes	Source
1977	Chaani	V. Shantaram	Ranjana Deshmukh, Yashvant Dutt Siddharth Ray			Dubbed in Hindi with same name.	
1977	Jait Re Jait	Dr. Jabbar Patel	Smita Patil, Mohan Agashe, Nilu Phule, Sulabha Deshpande			National Film Award for Best Feature Film in Marathi in 1977.	
1977	Naav Motha Lakshan Khota	Murlidhar Kapdi	Usha Chavan, Dhumal, Nilu Phule				
1977	Devaki Nandan Gopala	Rajdutt	Dr Shriram Lagoo				
1977	Ram Ram Gangaram	Dada Kondke	Master Bhagwan, Usha Chavan, Dada Kondke		Dada Kondke		
1977	Bala Gau Kashi Angai	Kamalakar Torne	Raja Bapat, Vatsala Deshmukh, Vikram Gokhale, Asha Kale	14 April 1977 (India)	Everest Entertainment		
1977	Navra Mazha Brahmachari	Dutta Keshav Kulkarni	Yashwant Dutt				
1977	Bhingri	Dutta Keshav Kulkarni					
1977	Padarachya Savleet	Prabhakar Naik	Nilu Phule				
1977	Mansa Paris Mendhare Bari	Prabhakar Naik					
1977	Badla	Dutta Keshav Kulkarni					
1977	Asla Navra Nakoga Bai	Anant Mane					
1977	Tuch Majhi Rani	Dutta Keshav Kulkarni	Madhu Apte, Padma Chavan, Amol Palekar	1 January 1977 (India)			
