= List of Marathi films of 1980 =

A list of films produced by the Marathi language film industry based in Maharashtra in the year 1980.

== 1980 Releases ==
A list of Marathi films released in 1980.

Year	Film	Director	Cast	Release Date	Producer	Notes	Source
1980	Bhalu	Rajdutt	Prakash Bhende, Uma Bhende, Vikram Gokhale	October 1980 (India)	Everest Entertainment		
1980	Choravar More	Murlidhar Kapdi	Usha Chavan, Mohan Gokhale, Viju Khote				
1980	Savli Premachi	Datta Keshav					
1980	Zaakol	Shreeram Lagoo	Shreeram Lagoo, Urmila Matondkar, Tanuja	5 September 1980		Urmila Matondkar's acting debut	
1980	Hyoch Navra Pahije	Dada Kondke	Dada Kondke, Jayshree T.		Dada Kondke		
1980	Gad Jejuri Jejuri	Ram Kadam	Jayamala Kale, Nana Patekar	2 February 1980 (India)			
1980	Zidd	Datta Keshav					
1980	Phatakadi	Datta Keshav	Usha Kiran, Shreeram Lagoo, Nilu Phule				
1980	Saavaz	Anant Mane					
1980	Ranpakhre	Arun Vasudev Karnatki					
1980	Kadaklakshmi	Murlidhar Kapdi	Yashwant Dutt, Jayshree Gadkar, Prakash Inamdar				
