= Lek Chalali Sasarla =

- Poster
- Directed by: N. S. Vaidya
- Written by: Annasaheb Deulgaonkar; N. G. Karmarkar
- Produced by: Annasaheb Deulgaonkar
- Starring: Alka Kubal; Mahesh Kothare; Laxmikant Berde; Sharad Talwalkar; Saroj Sukhtankar; Savita Prabhune; Shashikala Jawalkar; Jairam Kulkarni
- Cinematography: Suryakant Lavande
- Edited by: N. S. Vaidya
- Music by: Raamlaxman
- Production company: Rasikraj Productions
- Release date: 1984
- Running time: 156 minutes
- Country: India
- Language: Marathi

Lek Chalali Sasarla (transl. The Daughter went to marital home) is a 1984 Indian Marathi-language drama film directed by N. S. Vaidya in his directorial debut. The film is produced by Annasaheb Deulgaonkar, who co-wrote screenplay and dialogues with N. G. Karmarkar. The film stars Mahesh Kothare, Alka Kubal, Laxmikant Berde (debut in Marathi cinema). The film is about the problem of bride–burning for dowry has created a stir all over Maharashtra.

== Plot ==
The lovely Mukta is the poster master Bapusaheb's daughter. While still in college, she marries Vilas, the son of the avaricious Aai Saheb, who demands a large dowry from Mukta's family. After their marriage, Vilas has an affair in secret with another woman, and Aai Saheb harasses Mukta constantly. The only person who stands up for Mukta in the family is her sister-in-law, Jyothi, who confronts her mother when she mistreats her. Deepak, whom Jyothi is in love with, feels awful for Mukta because of how she is treated. After seeing a picture of Vilas with another woman one day, Mukta is devastated and tells her parents about it. When Mukta returns to her in-laws, her father finds Aaisaheb abusing her and takes her back to his house. Jyothi then leaves her home with Deepak because she can't stand how her mother and brother treat her.

A few days later, Bapusaheb receives a telegram informing him that Aaisaheb is ill and asks Mukta to show forgiveness. Mukta steps in to support Aaisaheb. While they are traveling, Jyothi, Deepak, and their driver notice something strange: Aaisaheb has called Mukta back. When they meet her, Aaisaheb reveals that everything was orchestrated by her and Vilas to get Mukta back so they could kill her. When Jyothi discovers the crime and passes out, Aaisaheb and Vilas set Mukta on fire. Vilas and Aaisaheb keep her locked in the house and warn her not to tell anyone the truth. However, Deepak and the driver are able to free her, and she tells the truth that Mukta was killed by Aaisaheb and Vilas for dowry. In the end, Aaisaheb and Vilas are taken into custody by the police.

== Cast ==
- Alka Kubal as Mukta Ghorpade–Inamdar
- Mahesh Kothare as Vilas Inamdar
- Laxmikant Berde as Deepak Waghmare
- Sharad Talwalkar as Bapusaheb Ghorpade
- Saroj Sukhtankar as Sushila Ghorpade
- Savita Prabhune as Jyothi
- Shashikala as Aaisaheb Inamdar
- Jairam Kulkarni as Desai Kaka
- Alka Inamdar as Parobai
- Asha Patil as Aatyabai
- Arun Sarnaik as Wagh
- Bhalchandra Kulkarni as Police officer
- Ashok Pahelwan as Dhabade's henchmen
- Shobha Shiralkar as Bindu

== Music ==
The music is composed by Raamlaxman and lyrics are written by Annasaheb Deulgaonkar, Anant Jadhav. The songs are sung by Asha Bhosale, Lata Mangeshkar and Mahendra Kapoor.
