= Aage Ki Soch =

1988 film by Dada Kondke

- Directed by: Dada Kondke
- Starring: Shakti Kapoor; Swapna; Raza Murad; Satish Shah
- Music by: Raam Laxman
- Release date: 22 April 1988
- Country: India
- Language: Hindi

Aage Ki Soch is 1988 Hindi language Drama movie directed by Dada Kondke, starring Shakti Kapoor, Swapna, Raza Murad and Satish Shah.

== Cast ==
- Dada Kondke as Shashi
- Shakti Kapoor as Pratap
- Swapna as Anuja
- Raza Murad as Prithvi
- Satish Shah as Nandlal
- Huma Khan as Suman
- Manorama Wagle as Nirmala

== Soundtrack ==
#	Song	Singer
1	"O Mere Pyare Bail, Chala Chal Zor Se"	Kishore Kumar
2	"Heeron Se, Moti Se"	Kishore Kumar, Usha Mangeshkar
3	"Sapna O Sapna"	Kishore Kumar, Usha Mangeshkar
4	"Phudak Phudakke Na Chal"	Kishore Kumar, Usha Mangeshkar
5	"Kalkatte Ki Kalavati Main"	Usha Mangeshkar
