= Shirdi Ke Sai Baba =

- Directed by: Ashok V. Bhushan
- Screenplay by: Manoj Kumar
- Produced by: Sarla Charities Trust
- Starring: Sudhir Dalvi; Manoj Kumar; Rajendra Kumar; Hema Malini
- Narrated by: Manoj Kumar
- Music by: Pandurang Dixit
- Release date: 4 March 1977.
- Country: India
- Language: Hindi

Shirdi Ke Sai Baba is a 1977 Indian Hindi-language biographical film written and directed by Ashok V. Bhushan. The plot revolves around a sick child who wishes to be taken to Shirdi, where the guru Sai Baba of Shirdi lived.

== Cast ==
- Sudhir Dalvi as Sai Baba of Shirdi
- Manoj Kumar as Devotee & Scientist
- Rajendra Kumar as Doctor (Pooja's husband)
- Hema Malini as Pooja
- Shatrughan Sinha as Heera
- Premnath as Som Dev
- Madan Puri as Ranveer Singh
- Dheeraj Kumar as Tatya Kote
- Krishan Dhawan as Chand Patil
- Manmohan Krishna as Dasganu
- Raj Mehra as Bapusaheb Buti
- Jyotsna Kirpekar as Laxmi
- Kanwarjit Paintal as Karim
- Ratnamala as Baijamma
- Birbal Khosla as Kulkarni in Shirdi
- B. M. Vyas as Vaid Mangal
- Sachin as Sarju
- Usha Chavan as Guest in Song
- Vatsala Deshmukh as Tahsildar Wife
- Shrikant Moghe as Tahsildar Chandorkar
- Gurbachan Singh as Bandit
- C. S. Dubey as Groom's dad
- Master Ravi as Little Child Dipak
- Master Titto Khatri as Heera Child
- Laxman Chawla
- Pritam Beli

== Music ==
1. "Sai Baba Bolo, Sai Baba Bolo" - Mohammed Rafi, Jani Babu, Anuradha Paudwal, Anup Jalota
2. "Bhola Bhandari Sai, Bhola Bhandari" - Anup Jalota, Dilraj Kaur
3. "Sumer Manwa Sumer Re Panch" - Anup Jalota
4. "Dam Dam Damroo Baaje, Are Sai Nath Shiv Shambhu Wale" - Anup Jalota
5. "O Dukhiyo Ke Data" - Asha Bhosle
6. "Dar Bhi Chhoda Tujhe Mann Me Basa Ke" - Asha Bhosle
7. "Dipaawali Manaai Suhaani" - Asha Bhosle
8. "Sainath Tere Hajaro Haath" - Mohammed Rafi, Usha Mangeshkar

== See also ==
- Sri Shirdi Saibaba Mahathyam, a 1986 Telugu film starring Vijayachander as Sai Baba of Shirdi
- Jagadguru Sri Shiridi Saibaba a 2009 Telugu film starring B. V. Reddy as Sai Baba of Shirdi
- Shirdi Sai, a 2012 Telugu film starring Nagarjuna as Sai Baba of Shirdi
- Mere Sai – Shraddha Aur Saburi, a Television series between 2021 and 2023 starring Tushar Dalvi, Abeer Soofi and Abhishek Nigam as Sai Baba of Shirdi
