= Dhagala Lagali Kala =

1978 Indian Marathi song

Song by Mahendra Kapoor, Usha Mangeshkar

from the album Bot Lavin Tithe Gudgulya
- Language: Marathi
- Released: 1978
- Genre: Folk; filmi; pop; dance
- Length: 5:25
- Label: Saregama India Limited
- Composer: Raamlaxman
- Lyricist: Dada Kondke
- Producer: Venkatesh Kulkarni

Music video
- Dhagala Lagali Kala – Lyrical video on YouTube

"Dhagala Lagali Kala" (Note: The song is also referred to as "Var Dhagala Lagali Kala" or in its longer version, "Var Dhagala Lagali Kala Pani Themb Themb Gala.") is an Indian Marathi-language song from the soundtrack of Bot Lavin Tithe Gudgulya. Sung by Mahendra Kapoor and Usha Mangeshkar, the song was originally performed by Dada Kondke, who also wrote the lyrics, with music composed by Raamlaxman. The track features Dada Kondke and Usha Chavan. It is known for its double entendre lyrics, became a huge hit and remains a well-known dance anthem.

== Development ==
The inspiration for the song struck Dada Kondke during a hunting expedition in the Radhanagari Wildlife Sanctuary.

He observed a solitary black cloud in the sky, which began to release a light drizzle. The tranquil scene and the rhythmic sound of the rain inspired him to write the song, capturing the serene atmosphere and the gentle fall of the rain.

== Other versions ==
A remix version of the song with the same title was featured in Dream Girl, starring Ayushmann Khurrana, Nushrratt Bharuccha, and Riteish Deshmukh (in a guest appearance). The remix, composed by the Meet Bros, who also provided vocals alongside Mika Singh and Jyotica Tangri, was part of the film's soundtrack. However, the situation escalated when Saregama, the copyright holder of the original song, filed a petition against the version used in Dream Girl. As a result, the Delhi High Court imposed restrictions on the film's makers, prohibiting them from using any part of the original track. The court further ordered the removal of the promotional song, "Dhagala Lagali Kala," from all digital platforms due to copyright violations.

The tune of song also reused in 2001 in Telugu language song "Dum Dum Dum" from the film Murari, sung by Shankar Mahadevan and written by Veturi.
