= Bot Lavin Tithe Gudgulya =

1978 Indian film by Dada Kondke

- Theatrical release poster
- Directed by: Dada Kondke
- Screenplay by: Rajesh Mujumdar
- Produced by: Dada Kondke
- Starring: Dada Kondke; Usha Chavan; Ratnamala; Padma Chavan
- Cinematography: Arvind Lad
- Edited by: N. S. Vaidya
- Music by: Raamlaxman
- Production company: Sadiccha Chitra
- Release date: 10 November 1978
- Running time: 153 minutes
- Country: India
- Language: Marathi

Bot Lavin Tithe Gudgulya (transl. Wherever I touch with my finger, it tickles)is a 1978 Indian Marathi language drama film directed by Dada Kondke and written by Rajesh Mujumdar. The film was produced and is starred by Dada Kondke with Usha Chavan.

The cinematography was handled by Arvind Lad and editing was provided by N. S. Vaidya. In addition, the soundtrack was composed by Raamlaxman. The song “Dhagala Lagali Kala” from the film became very popular after its release. It was widely liked by the audience and helped the movie gain more attention. Dada Kondke received the Maharashtra State Film Award for Best Director, while Usha Chavan won the Maharashtra State Film Award for Best Actress.

== Plot ==
Chotu (Dada Kondke) becomes deeply drawn to Maina (Usha Chavan), a Tamasha performer, much to the concern of his mother, Laxmibai (Ratnamala). She warns him to keep his distance, as his father’s life was once ruined due to his involvement with a dancer. Meanwhile, Maina faces pressure from her own mother, who expects her to follow the traditional path of Tamasha artists by attracting wealthy men. However, Maina refuses to accept this way of life, as she genuinely cares for Chotu.

At the same time, the village is shaken by a series of child kidnappings, creating fear among the residents. Determined to protect their community, a group of strong-willed women takes a stand against the culprits, with Chotu supporting their efforts. As events unfold, Maina begins to feel jealous of the growing bond between Chotu and the women leading the fight.

== Cast ==
- Dada Kondke as Chotu
- Usha Chavan as Maina
- Ratnamala as Laxmibai
- Padma Chavan
- Asha Patil as Gajre
- Vasant Shinde
- Pushpa Bhosale
- Dinkar Inamdar
- Mukund Gokhale
- Asawale Guruji

== Soundtrack ==
Bot Lavin Tithe Gudgulya

Soundtrack album by Raamlaxman
- Released: 1978
- Genre: Feature film soundtrack
- Length: 28:13
- Language: Marathi
- Label: Saregama India Limited

Official audio
- Bot Lavin Tithe Gudgulya- Full Album on YouTube

The music album was composed by Raamlaxman and songs were sung by Usha Mangeshkar and Mahendra Kapoor.

No.	Title	Lyricist	Singer(s)
1	"Dhagala Lagali Kala"	Dada Kondke	Usha Mangeshkar, Mahendra Kapoor
2	"Aai Majhya Lagnachi"	Rajesh Mujumdar	Usha Mangeshkar
3	"Mala Ek Chanas Hava"	Dada Kondke	Usha Mangeshkar, Mahendra Kapoor
4	"Tapasyet Dang"	Rajesh Mujumdar	Usha Mangeshkar, Mahendra Kapoor
5	"Shambharachi Note"	Dada Kondke	Usha Mangeshkar, Mahendra Kapoor
6	"Pikala Jambhul Todu Naka"	Dada Kondke, Rajesh Mujumdar	Usha Mangeshkar
