= Tumcha Aamcha Jamala =

Marathi movie

- Theatrical release poster
- Directed by: Dada Kondke
- Screenplay by: Datta Keshav; Rajesh Majumdar
- Produced by: Dada Kondke
- Starring: Dada Kondke; Anjana Mumtaz; Ashok Saraf
- Cinematography: Arvind Lad
- Edited by: N. S. Vaidya
- Music by: Raamlaxman
- Production company: Sadicha Chitra
- Release date: 29 April 1976
- Running time: 106 minutes
- Country: India
- Language: Marathi

Tumcha Aamcha Jamala (transl. You and I got along) is a 1976 Indian Marathi-language drama film directed by Dada Kondke and written by Datta Keshav and Rajesh Majumdar. The film was produced and is starred by Dada Kondke with Anjana Mumtaz and Ashok Saraf.

The cinematography was handled by Arvind Lad and editing was provided by N. S. Vaidya. In addition, the soundtrack was popular and composed by Raamlaxman. The film was a blockbuster at the box office.

== Plot ==
Aaba Chougule lives with his two sons—Nagojirao, the elder one, who has fallen into bad habits and Krushna, who is known for helping others. Aaba is tired of Nagya’s constant misbehavior and wants to ensure he stays away from his property. One day, Aaba’s old friend visits the village along with his daughter Radha. Radha falls in love with Krushna, and they decide to marry. However, before their marriage can take place, Nagya hatches a plan. He forces Aaba to sign over the property to him and in a fit of rage, kills Aaba.

Now owning everything, Nagya leaves Krushna with nothing. However, the villagers sympathize with Krushna and offer their support. Despite this, Krushna decides to leave the village and start a new life in another place, which happens to be Radha's uncle's village. There, Krishna and Radha reunite.

Meanwhile, Nagya falls into heavy debt and is eventually thrown out of his property by the villagers. Homeless, he comes across Krushna, who, despite everything, offers him a place to stay. However, Nagya betrays Krishna’s kindness by stealing from Radha’s uncle’s house. Krishna is wrongly accused of the crime and things take a dramatic turn as he tries to prove his innocence.

== Cast ==
- Dada Kondke as Krushna Chougule
- Anjana Mumtaz as Radha
- Ashok Saraf as Nagojirao Chougule
- Shanta Tambe as Nagoji's wife
- Rajani Chavan as Yamu
- Asha Patil as Savitri Mami
- Prakash Phadtare as Jaywantrao
- Bhalchandra Kulkarni as Mama
- Vikas Rakte as Pahelwan
- Vasant Shinde as Aaba Chougule

== Soundtrack ==
Tumcha Aamcha Jamala

Soundtrack album by Raamlaxman
- Released: 1976
- Genre: Feature film soundtrack
- Length: 26:50
- Language: Marathi
- Label: Saregama India Limited

Official audio
- Tumcha Aamcha Jamala- Full Album on YouTube

The music album was composed by Raamlaxman and songs were sung by Mahendra Kapoor, Asha Bhosle and Usha Mangeshkar.

No.	Title	Lyricist	Singer(s)	length
1	"Majha Majha Mhaneet Hoto"	Dada Kondke	Mahendra Kapoor, Asha Bhosle	3:15
2	"Chandanachya Patavar"	Dada Kondke	Usha Mangeshkar, Mahendra Kapoor	3:22
3	"Alya Alya Jau Naka"	Dada Kondke	Usha Mangeshkar	3:12
4	"Zalya Tinhisanja"	Dada Kondke	Usha Mangeshkar	6:30
5	"Anjanichya Suta"	Dada Kondke	Mahendra Kapoor	6:51
6	"Thamb Ga Pori"	Dada Kondke	Mahendra Kapoor, Usha Mangeshkar	3:17
