= Bangaarada Panjara =

- Directed by: V. Somashekhar
- Screenplay by: V. Somashekhar
- Based on: Ekta Jeev Sadashiv by Vasant Sabnis
- Produced by: Raja Shankar; A. L. Balu
- Starring: Dr. Rajkumar; Aarathi; Balakrishna; K. S. Ashwath
- Cinematography: Annayya; Mallik
- Edited by: P. Bhaktavatsalam
- Music by: G. K. Raghu
- Distributed by: Raja Productions
- Release date: 1974
- Running time: 167 minutes
- Country: India
- Language: Kannada

Bangaarada Panjara ( transl. Golden Cage) is a 1974 Indian Kannada-language comedy film directed by debutant V. Somashekhar and co-produced by actor Raja Shankar. It starred Dr. Rajkumar in the lead role along with Aarathi, K. S. Ashwath, Pandari Bai and Lokanath. The movie saw a theatrical run of 25 weeks.

The core plot of the movie is based on the Vasant Sabnis's Marathi play Ekta Jeev Sadashiv which had earlier been adapted into a 1972 Marathi movie of the same name starring Dada Kondke. The 2000 Hindi movie Jis Desh Mein Ganga Rehta Hain is based on the Marathi movie and this movie. The movie was remade in Telugu in 1978 as Dudu Basavanna starring Chalam with Pandari Bai reprising her role. This was actor Chalam's fourth remake of Rajkumar movie after Bhale Jodi, Mayor Muthanna and Sampathige Savaal.

== Plot ==
Beera is an innocent, young shepherd who loves his parents Nanjamma and Junjappa. One day Janaki, a middle aged woman comes to Beera's village with her husband and brother. It is revealed that Janaki is the biological mother of Beera and that Nanjamma and Junjappa were childless, raised Beera like their own son. Janaki asks Nanjamma and Junjappa to hand over their son back to her. They reluctantly agree and Beera is forcefully taken to a sophisticated house in Bangalore where he has 2 elder brothers, sisters-in-law and a younger brother. Everything in the house is new to him including the sophisticated way of living, food, even household equipments. Many comical incidents take place when Beera begins to explore things in the new house and the city. He also discovers his brother's illegitimate affair with a woman. Beera undergoes emotional turmoil due to the contrast manners and way of dealing things in the city. Unable to tolerate this, he finally returns to his foster parents and marries Mallamma whom he liked in the village.

== Cast ==
- Dr. Rajkumar as Beera
- Aarathi as Mallamma
- M. V. Rajamma as Nanjamma, Beera's Foster Mother
- K. S. Ashwath as Junjappa, Beera's Foster Father
- Pandari Bai as Janaki, Beera's Biological Mother
- Lokanath as Beera's Biological Father
- Balakrishna as Seetharamaiah, Janaki's brother
- Shivaram as Somashekar Rao, Janaki's son
- Vajramuni (Guest appearance)
- Thoogudeepa Srinivas (Guest appearance)
- Shakti Prasad (Guest appearance)
- Bindu as Reshma
- B. Jaya
- Raja Shankar as Lawyer Ravishankar, Janaki's son
- Vaishali Kasaravalli as Pallavi, Ravishankar's wife
- Shylashri as Seema
- Shani Mahadevappa as Chakravarthy
- H. R. Shastry as Vaidyaraj Bheemnarayan Pandit
- Joker Shyam as Raja

== Production ==
The film marked the directorial debut of V. Somasekhar. The filming was held at Chikmagalur.

== Soundtrack ==
The music of the film was composed by G. K. Raghu who was the brother of music director G. K. Venkatesh. The lyrics for the soundtrack written by Chi. Udaya Shankar.

=== Track list ===
#	Title	Singer(s)
1	"Bittare Sigadone"	P. B. Sreenivas, S. Janaki
2	"Kariya Kambali"	P. B. Sreenivas, S. Janaki
3	"Come And Meet Me"	P. B. Sreenivas, S. Janaki
4	"Suy Anno Gaali"	P. B. Sreenivas, S. Janaki
5	"Sloka"	Dr. Rajkumar

== Release ==
It became the first film to be screened at now-defunct Cauvery Theatre at Bengaluru.
