= Jagachya Pathivar =

- DVD cover
- Directed by: Raja Paranjape
- Screenplay by: G. D. Madgulkar
- Story by: Raja Paranjape
- Produced by: Raja Paranjape
- Starring: Raja Paranjape; Seema Deo; Dhumal; Raja Gosavi; Ramesh Deo; Sharad Talwalkar; Rekha Kamat
- Cinematography: Bal Bapat
- Edited by: Bal Korade
- Music by: Sudhir Phadke
- Production company: Shripad Chitra
- Release date: 16 April 1960
- Running time: 147 minutes
- Country: India
- Language: Marathi

Jagachya Pathivar (transl. On the back of the world) is a 1960 Indian Marathi-language musical drama film directed and produced by Raja Paranjape. Along with Paranjape the film stars Seema Deo, Dhumal, Raja Gosavi, Ramesh Deo, Sharad Talwalkar, Rekha Kamat also features.

== Plot ==
Sakharam was wandering for a job. While wandering he goes to a beggar's settlement. Here he meets a blind young girl. She feeds herself by dancing and singing. Sakharam supports her. But this girl is the lost daughter of a rich man. Her parents find her. The sign fits and her parents take her. She takes Sakharam with her. Good days come to Sakharam. His cycle of bad luck ends.

== Cast ==
- Raja Paranjape as Sakharam
- Seema Deo as Suma
- G.D.Madgulkar
- Dhumal as Dada
- Mai Bhide
- Vinay Kale
- Raja Gosavi
- Ramesh Deo
- Raja Patwardhan
- Sharad Talwalkar
- Raj Dutt
- Surekha Joshi
- Vasant Thengadi
- Kusum Deshpande
- Sudhir Phadke
- Anna Joshi
- Rekha Kamat

== Production ==
The film was produced at Rungata Cine Corporation (Pvt.) Ltd., Mumbai. It is produced by Raja Paranjape under the banner of Shripad Chitra.

== Soundtrack ==
Jagachya Pathivar

Soundtrack album by Sudhir Phadke
- Released: 31 December 1960
- Studios: His Master's Voice, Mumbai
- Genre: Feature film soundtrack
- Length: 24:15
- Language: Marathi

Official audio
- Jagachya Pathivar - Full Album on YouTube

The music composed by Sudhir Phadke and the songs are sung by Asha Bhosale and Sudhir Phadke while the lyrics were provided by G. D. Madgulkar. The songs became very popular at that time.

=== Track listing ===
No.	Title	Singer(s)	Length
1	"Ka ho dharila majwar raag "	Asha Bhosale	
2	"Bai mi vikat ghetla shyam"	Asha Bhosale, Sudhir Phadke	
3	"Jag he bandishala"	Sudhir Phadke	
4	"Tula Pahate re"	Asha Bhosale	
5	"Ek dhaga sukhacha"	Sudhir Phadke	
6	"Uddhava ajab tujhe sarkar "	Sudhir Phadke	
7	"Thakle re nandlala"	Asha bhosle	
