= Ram Ram Pahuna =

- Directed by: Dinkar D. Patil
- Story by: Dinkar D. Patil
- Produced by: K. V. Alurkar
- Starring: Chandrakant Mandare; Ratnamala; Kumud; Baburao Athane; Damuanna Malvankar
- Cinematography: Shankar Savekar
- Edited by: Madhav Shinde
- Music by: Lata Mangeshkar
- Production company: Uday Kala Chitra
- Release date: 1 January 1950
- Running time: 122 minutes
- Country: India
- Language: Marathi

Ram Ram Pahuna is a 1950 Indian Marathi-language film directed by Dinkar D. Patil and produced by A. V. Alurkar under the banner of Udya Kala Chitra. The film stars Chandrakant Mandare, Ratnamala, Kumud, Damuanna Malvankar and Baburao Athane in the pivotal roles. The music is composed by Lata Mangeshkar. The film marked Patil's directorial debut and Mangeshkar's music directorial debut in Marathi cinema. The film celebrated its silver jubilee.

== Plot ==
Shreepati Patil is a hardworking farmer who lives with his wife, Lakshmi. When his stepbrother Jaysingh passes the revenue department examination, Shreepati sends him to the city to study English under their maternal uncle, Sarkar (Damuanna Malvankar). However, Sarkar and his wife, lead extravagant and deceitful lives. Sarkar schemes to bring Jaysingh and his niece Lila closer, while turning Jaysingh against Shreepati.

When Shreepati's mother becomes seriously ill, Sarkar convinces Jaysingh that Shreepati is using the situation to avoid sending money. As a result, Jaysingh refuses to visit his ailing mother. He eventually marries Lila, but Sarkar and his wife continue to manipulate the couple. Lila accuses Shreepati of inappropriate behaviour and demands a division of the family property. Sarkar steals the family's jewellery and frames Shreepati for the theft, forcing him, Lakshmi and their young daughter Kamali to leave their home. Sarkar further misleads Jaysingh and takes him into a life of vice. However, the courtesan Tulasa exposes Sarkar's schemes, prompting Jaysingh to realise his mistakes and seek forgiveness from Shreepati. On his way, Jaysingh's bullock cart runs over Kamali, but she survives. He takes her to Shreepati and apologises to his brother and sister-in-law. The stolen jewellery is eventually found in Sarkar's possession, leading to his arrest. The film ends with Jaysingh bidding farewell to his uncle by saying, "Ram Ram Pahuna."

== Cast ==
- Chandrakant Mandare as Shreepati Patil
- Ratnamala as Lakshmi Patil
- Baburao Athane as Jaysingh Patil
- Kumud as Lila
- Damuanna Malvankar as Sarkar Mama
- Kusum Deshpande as Mahima Mami
- Shakuntala Bhome as Tulasa
- Baby Asha as Kamala

== Soundtrack ==
Ram Ram Pahuna

Soundtrack album by Lata Mangeshkar
- Released: 1950
- Genre: Feature film soundtrack
- Length: 22:51
- Language: Marathi
- Label: Saregama India Limited

Official audio
- Ram Ram Pahuna- Full Album on YouTube

The music album was composed by Lata Mangeshkar and lyrics are written by P. Savalaram.

=== Track listing ===
No.	Title	Singer(s)	Length
1	"Haath Jodite Padar Pasarite"	Meena Khadikar	3:34
2	"Shapath Dudhachi"	Lata Mangeshkar	3:12
3	"Tu Gupit Kunala Sangoo Nako"	Lata Mangeshkar	3:24
4	"Aale Vayat Me"	Lata Mangeshkar	3:07
5	"Pahuna Mhanoni Aala"	Lata Mangeshkar	3:15
6	"Mazya Shetat Sonach Piktay Ga"	Meena Khadikar, C. Ramchandra	3:31
