= Pandu Havaldar =

Pandu Hawaldar
- Poster
- Directed by: Dada Kondke
- Written by: Rajesh Majumdar
- Produced by: Dada Kondke
- Starring: Dada Kondke; Ashok Saraf; Usha Chavan
- Cinematography: Arvind Lad
- Edited by: N. S. Vaidya
- Music by: Raamlaxman
- Production company: Sadichha Chitra
- Release date: 29 March 1975
- Running time: 143 minutes
- Country: India
- Language: Marathi

Pandu Havaldar (transl. Constable Pandu) is a 1975 Indian Marathi-language comedy film directed and produced by Dada Kondke under the banner of Sadichha Chitra. The film's story, screenplay and dialogues were written by Rajesh Majumdar. The film starring an ensemble cast of Dada Kondke, Usha Chavan, Ashok Saraf, Lata Arun, Ratnamala, Pramod Damle. Saraf Won Maharashtra State Film Award for Best Supporting Actor.

== Plot ==
A fruit merchant with ties to a smuggling organisation, Paru Kelewali, is allied with Pandu Havaldar, a hilarious person whose outfit undermines any attempt to appear authoritative. Pandu Havaldar is a corrupt police officer. The police officer humanises himself by rescuing a deaf and stupid woman, therefore breaking up the gang.

== Cast ==
- Dada Kondke as Pandu Havaldar
- Ashok Saraf as Havaldar Sakharam
- Usha Chavan as Paro Kelewali
- Lata Arun as Sakharam's wife
- Roohi Berde as Shobha
- Ratnamala as Radhabai; Pandu's mother
- Baby Vinaya as Yami; Sakharam's daughter
- Mohan Kotiwan as Gangster
- Anant Senjit
- Pramod Damle

== Reception ==
The film achieved a huge box office success. It ran over than 25 weeks in theatres.

== Soundtrack ==
Pandu Havaldar

Soundtrack album by Raamlaxman
- Released: 1975
- Genre: Feature film soundtrack
- Length: 20:45
- Language: Marathi
- Label: Saregama India Limited

Official audio
- Pandu Havaldar - Full Album on YouTube

The movie soundtrack has 6 songs composed by Raamlaxman.

=== Track listing ===
No.	Title	Singer(s)	Length
1	"Mee Tar Bholi Adani Thakoo"	Jaywant Kulkarni, Usha Mangeshkar	3:03
2	"Kulpachi Chavi"	Pushpa Pagdhare	3:38
3	"Mumbaichi Kelewali"	Usha Mangeshkar	3:17
4	"Marji Tumchi"	Usha Mangeshkar	3:34
5	"Whiskichi Batli"	Jaywant Kulkarni, Usha Mangeshkar	3:36
6	"Ye Na Jawal Ghe Na"	Jaywant Kulkarni, Usha Mangeshkar	3:34
