= Ekta Jeev Sadashiv =

- Theatrical release poster
- Directed by: Govind Kulkarni
- Written by: Vasant Sabnis
- Produced by: Dada Kondke
- Starring: Dada Kondke; Usha Chavan
- Cinematography: Shankarao Savekar
- Edited by: N. S. Vaidya
- Music by: Ram Kadam
- Production company: Sadicha Chitra
- Release date: 8 December 1972
- Country: India
- Language: Marathi

Ekta Jeev Sadashiv is a 1972 Indian Marathi-language comedy drama film directed by Govind Kulkarni, starring Dada Kondke and Usha Chavan as leads. It was remade in Hindi as Jis Desh Mein Ganga Rehta Hain, which was released in 2000. The core plot of the 1974 Kannada movie Bangaarada Panjara was thematically similar to this movie since it was also based on the Marathi play Ekta Jeev Sadashiv.

== Plot ==
Sadashiv, the infant son of a rich family, has an unspecified childhood illness. For reasons of health, Sadashiv's family sends him away from the city to live in a country village. There he is raised by a simple couple whom he regards as his parents. When he becomes a young man, he falls in love with a village girl. When the time comes for Sadashiv to marry, his parents inform him that his biological parents live in the city and want him to settle there. Sadashiv bids a tearful farewell to his village and its inhabitants. He travels to the city of his birth parents. The rest of the movie presents the young man's comic struggle to adjust to city life, its corruption, and its hypocrisy.

== Cast ==
- Dada Kondke as Sadashiv
- Usha Chavan as Manji
- Ratnamala as Laxmi
- Sharad Talwalkar as Bhagwantrao
- Gulab Korgaonkar as Bajaba
- Suman Jagtap
- Pushpa Bhosale
- Madhu Apte
- Bipin Talpade
- Nana Oak
- Saroj Sukhtankar
- Janardhan Sohni
- Appa Gajmal
- Dhananjay Bhave
- B. Majnalkar
- Bhalchandra Kulkarni
- Gulab Mokashi
- Madhu Bhosle
- Pramod Damle
- Sampat Nikam
- Damodar Gaikwad
- Vasant Khedekar
- Sadhana Bhosle

== Soundtrack ==
Ekta Jeev Sadashiv

Soundtrack album by Ram Kadam
- Released: 1974
- Genre: Feature film soundtrack
- Length: 14:23
- Language: Marathi
- Label: Saregama India Limited

Official audio
- Ekta Jeev Sadashiv - Full Album on YouTube

The music is composed by Ram Kadam and lyrics by Jagdish Khebudkar and Dada Kondke.

=== Track listing ===
No.	Title	Singer(s)	Lyrics	Length
1	"Kal Rateela Sapan Padlan"	Jaywant Kulkarni, Usha Mangeshkar	Dada Kondke	3:49
2	"Labad Langda Dhong Karatay"	Jaywant Kulkarni	Jagdish Khebudkar	3:37
3	"Mansa Paris Mendhara Bari"	Jaywant Kulkarni	Dada Kondke	3:03
4	"Nako Chalus Dudkya Chali"	Jaywant Kulkarni	Jagdish Khebudkar	3:36

== Remakes ==
- Bangaarada Panjara (Kannada)
- Jis Desh Mein Ganga Rahta Hain (Hindi)
- Mayer Anchal (Bengali)
