= Songadya =

- Theatrical release poster
- Directed by: Govind Kulkarni
- Screenplay by: Vasant Sabnis
- Produced by: Dada Kondke
- Starring: Dada Kondke; Usha Chavan; Nilu Phule; Ganpat Patil
- Cinematography: Arvind Lad
- Edited by: N. S. Vaidya
- Music by: Ram Kadam
- Production company: Sadicha Chitra
- Release date: 24 February 1971
- Running time: 142 minutes
- Country: India
- Language: Marathi

Songadya (transl. Jester) (Note: In Marathi, "Songadya" means a Buffoon character in Tamasha) is a 1971 Indian Marathi-language drama film directed by Govind Kulkarni and written by Vasant Sabnis. The film was produced and is starred by Dada Kondke with Usha Chavan. It was the debut of Kondke's own kind of ribald comedy, vaguely borrowed from tamasha, with a seductive heroine, an innocent but bumbling hero, and dialogue full of innuendo and sexual puns.

The cinematography was handled by Arvind Lad and editing was provided by N. S. Vaidya. In addition, the soundtrack was composed by Ram Kadam. The film was a huge box office hit ran over than 25 weeks in theatres.

== Plot ==
The gentle Namya, son of the rough Shitabai, is brought to a Tamasha performance by his friends. He becomes so enthralled by the Draupadi's Vastraharan episode from Mahabharata that he rushes onto the stage, interfering with the performance. When the actor supposed to portray the monkey god Hanuman becomes inebriated, he is asked to understudy the role and heads to the next hamlet to witness the show again. Namya is ejected from the house by his grieving mother, but dancer Kalavati gives him a place to stay. Then Namya, a simpleton, develops feelings for Kalavati, a gorgeous woman.

== Cast ==
- Dada Kondke as Namdeo (Namya)
- Usha Chavan as Kalavati
- Nilu Phule as Battashya
- Ganpat Patil
- Ratnamala as Shitabai
- Gulab Mokashi
- Bhalchandra Kulkarni
- Vasant Khedekar
- Sampat Nikam
- Madhu Bhosale
- Damodar Gaikwad
- Shanta Tambe

== Soundtrack ==
Songadya

Soundtrack album by Ram Kadam
- Released: 1971
- Genre: Feature film soundtrack
- Length: 23:56
- Language: Marathi
- Label: Saregama India Limited

Official audio
- Songadya - Full Album on YouTube

The music album was composed by Ram Kadam and songs were sung by Suman Kalyanpur, Usha Mangeshkar, Krishna Kulle, Jaywant Kulkarni, Pushpa Pagdhare. The sound design was by Ramnath Jathar and sound recording was done by Mangesh Desai, B. N. Sharma.

No.	Title	Lyricist	Singer(s)	length
1	"Raya Chala Ghodyavarti Basu"	Vasant Sabnis	Usha Mangeshkar	3:23
2	"Kay Ga Sakhoo"	Dada Kondke	Usha Mangeshkar, Jaywant Kulkarni	3:43
3	"Raya Mala Pavsat Neu Naka"	Vasant Sabnis	Pushpa Pagdhare	3:29
4	"Malyachya Malya Madhi Kon Ga Ubhi"	Dada Kondke	Usha Mangeshkar, Jaywant Kulkarni	3:45
5	"Biba Ghya Biba"	Jagdish Khebudkar	Krishna Kalle	6:01
6	"Gela Sodun Majasi Kanha"	Vasant Sabnis	Suman Kalyanpur	3:19

== Controversy ==
Kohinoor Theatre's owner in Dadar choose to show Dev Anand's Teen Devian despite Kondke having reserved the venue four weeks in advance. Dada Kondke then asked Balasaheb Thackeray, the head of the Shiv Sena, for assistance. Before long, Shiv Sainiks assembled and began demonstrating outside the venue. When "Songadya" was eventually launched in Kohinoor, it became very popular.
