= Jis Desh Mein Ganga Rehta Hain =

2000 film by Mahesh Manjrekar

- Poster
- Directed by: Mahesh Manjrekar
- Written by: Mahesh Manjrekar
- Based on: Ekta Jeev Sadashiv by Vasant Sabnis
- Produced by: Jackie Shroff; Ayesha Shroff
- Starring: Govinda; Sonali Bendre; Rinke Khanna
- Cinematography: Teja
- Edited by: V. N. Mayekar
- Music by: Anand Raj Anand
- Distributed by: Universal Music
- Release date: 13 October 2000
- Running time: 149 minutes
- Country: India
- Language: Hindi

Jis Desh Mein Ganga Rehta Hai (transl. The Country Where Ganga Lives) is 2000 Indian Hindi-language comedy film directed by Mahesh Manjrekar and starring Govinda and Sonali Bendre as leads. It is a remake of the 1972 Marathi film Ekta Jeev Sadashiv, and the 1974 Kannada film Bangaarada Panjara. It was later remade in Bengali as Mayer Anchal (2003).

== Plot ==
Gangaram, alias Ganga, lives the simple life in a rural village with his mother, his father, and his lover and childhood friend, Saavni.

When the time comes for Ganga to marry, his parents inform him that his biological parents live in the city; they want him to settle there. Ganga bids a tearful farewell to his fellow villagers and travels to the city where his birth parents live. There he meets his elder brother, who is married to Supriya, his younger siblings, as well as his wealthy birth parents, Avinash and Radha. Ganga struggles to cope with modern city life. His sister-in-law dislikes him more with each passing day.

Soon word spreads that Ganga is an eligible bachelor. His parents want him to marry a socialite, Tina. Ganga agrees to all his newfound family wants him to do, but things start to go bad for Ganga, and he flees his biological parents' home. He discovers his older brother is being blackmailed by a woman and two goons. Ganga saves his brother, but one of the goons stabs his best friend, and Ganga is accused of the stabbing. Ganga refuses to speak the truth about the incident in court because he doesn't want to ruin his family's reputation. However, his sister-in-law, who has learned the truth from her husband, is able to prove Ganga's innocence in court.

After the verdict, Ganga and his best friend return to their village. There, Ganga reunites with Saavni, and his parents consent to let them get married.

== Cast ==
- Govinda as Ganga
- Sonali Bendre as Saavni
- Rinke Khanna as Tina Dutt
- Ankush Choudhary as Rahul Vashisht
- Milind Gunaji as Milind
- Supriya Karnik as Supriya Gokhale
- Shivaji Satam as Gangaram's Father
- Reema Lagoo as Gangaram Mother
- Shakti Kapoor as Avinash Trivedi
- Himani Shivpuri as Radha
- Kishore Nandlaskar as Sannata
- Anand Abhyankar as Tina Father
- Nandu Madhav as Iqbal Ansari
- Atul Kale as Birbal, Avinash's Secretary
- Rajendra Gupta as guest appearance in song "Prem nagar me"
- Makarand Anaspure
- Farhad Shahnawaz
- Rakhi Sawant
- Herman D'souza as villain Rakhi sawant's brother

== Soundtrack ==
Jis Desh Mein Ganga Rehta Hain

Soundtrack album by Anand Raaj Anand
- Released: 2000
- Genre: Feature film soundtrack
- Label: Universal Music India

The soundtrack is on Universal Music, the music is composed by Anand Raaj Anand, while the songs are written by Dev Kohli and Praveen Bhardwaj.

#	Title	Singer(s)
1	"Chal Jhoothi"	Udit Narayan, Shraddha Pandit
2	"O Piya O Piya Sun"	Sukhwinder Singh, Sadhana Sargam
3	"Prem Jaal Mein"	Sukhwinder Singh, Anuradha Sriram
4	"Jis Desh Mein Ganga"	Abhijeet
5	"Matari Kohtari Tumbo"	Atul Kale
6	"Shadi Karvado"	Udit Narayan, Sapna Awasthi
7	"Kem Chhe"	Bali Brahmbhatt, Sunidhi Chauhan

== Reception ==
Sharmila Taliculam of Rediff.com wrote, "Mahesh Manjrekar's comedy bid, though a good attempt, makes you wish he had chosen a more original subject." Taran Adarsh of IndiaFM gave the film 2 out of 5, writing, "On the whole, JIS DESH MEIN GANGA REHTA HAI pales when compared to Mahesh Manjrekar's previous attempts. At best, it will entertain to the select few in Maharashtra because of the Maharashtrian flavour in the film."
