= Bhakta Pundalik =

1975 film

- Theatrical release poster
- Directed by: Dutta Dharmadhikari
- Written by: Annasaheb Deulgaonkar
- Produced by: Ram Devtale, Ram Karve
- Starring: Sarala Yeolekar; Saroj Sukhtankar; Lata Arun; Heera Chavan; Yashwant Dutt; Chandrakant Gokhale
- Cinematography: Arvind Lad
- Edited by: Gangaram Mathphod
- Music by: Bhaskar Chandavarkar
- Production company: Vilas Chitra
- Release date: 19 February 1975
- Country: India
- Language: Marathi

Bhakta Pundalik is a Marathi movie released on 19 February 1975. The movie has been produced by Ram Devtale and Ram Karve and directed by Dutta Dharmadhikari. The film had a 30 week run in Padma Talkies of Kolhapur.

== Cast ==
- Yashwant Dutt
- Chandrakant Gokhale
- Sarala Yeolekar
- Saroj Sukhtankar
- Lata Arun
- Heera Chavan

== Soundtrack ==
The music was directed by Bhaskar Chandavarkar.

=== Track listing ===
No.	Title	Length
1.	"Pundalika Bheti Parabramha Aale"	3:30
2.	"Jya Zhadani Dili Saavali"	4:49
3.	"Maaybaap Seva Pavitra"	3:26
