= Khol De Meri Zuban =

- Directed by: Dada Kondke
- Produced by: Dada Kondke
- Starring: Dada Kondke; Mehmood
- Music by: Raam Laxman
- Release date: 1989
- Country: India
- Language: Hindi

Khol De Meri Zuban is a 1989 Bollywood film directed by Dada Kondke and starring Dada Kondke, Bandini Mishra, Mehmood, Viju Khote, Satish Shah and Ratan Mala.
