= Pasant Aahe Mulgi (1956 film) =

1956 Indian Marathi-language film

- Theatrical release poster
- Directed by: Raja Paranjape
- Screenplay by: G.D. Madgulkar
- Story by: N.G. Karmarkar
- Produced by: Vamanrao Kulkarni; Vishnupant Chavan
- Starring: Raja Gosavi; Rekha; Dhumal; Ramesh Deo; Baburao Pendharkar
- Cinematography: Vasant Veltangadi
- Edited by: Balasaheb Ghatage
- Music by: Vasant Pawar
- Production company: Mangal Pictures
- Distributed by: Navchitra Film Exchange, Mumbai
- Release date: 29 November 1956
- Country: India
- Language: Marathi

Pasant Aahe Mulgi (transl. I Have Liked the Girl) is a 1956 Indian Marathi-language drama film directed by Raja Paranjape and produced by Mangal Pictures. It stars Raja Gosavi, Rekha, Dhumal, Ramesh Deo, Baburao Pendharkar.

== Cast ==
- Raja Gosavi
- Rekha
- Dhumal
- Ramesh Deo
- Baburao Pendharkar
- Vinay Kale
- Prabhakar Mujumdar
- Kumar Vikram
- Chandrakant Gokhale
- Leela Mehta
- Raosaheb Joglekar
- Vasant Thengadi
- Prabhakar Naik
