= Dher Chalaki Jinkara =

1971 Bhojpuri film

- Directed by: Datta Keshav
- Produced by: Lalchand Tejwan Chug
- Starring: Raja Gosavi
- Music by: Shankar Rao Kulkarni
- Release date: 1971
- Country: India
- Language: Bhojpuri

Dher Chalaki Jinkara (Bhojpuri for Don’t act too smart) is a 1971 Bhojpuri language comedy film directed by Datta Keshav. The film was produced by Lalchand Tejwan Chug with film star Raja Gosavi in the lead role.

The film is a remake of the Marathi language film Ati Shahana Tyachya (1966), which was also directed by Datta Keshav and starred Raja Gosavi in the lead role. Both Keshav and Gosavi were prominent figures in Marathi cinema; Keshav directed over 25 Marathi films, while Gosavi appeared in more than 80 films over a career spanning three decades. Dher Chalaki Jinkara marked their debut in Bhojpuri cinema and remains the only Bhojpuri film in which they worked.

The significance of Dher Chalaki Jinkara lies in its release during a period marked by multiple box office failures in the Bhojpuri film industry, which was attempting to stabilize following the initial commercial success of Ganga Maiyya Tohe Piyari Chadhaibo (1962), Laagi Nahi Chhute Ram (1963), and Bidesiya (1963). Dher Chalaki Jinkara is the only Bhojpuri film released between 1969 and 1976, giving it notable place in the industry's early history.

== Cast ==
- Raja Gosavi
- Agha

== Soundtrack ==
The film's soundtrack was composed by Shanker Rao Kulkarni.
