= Palva Palvi =

- Poster
- Directed by: Dada Kondke
- Written by: Dada Kondke; Rajesh Mujumdar
- Screenplay by: Rajesh Mujumdar
- Story by: Dada Kondke; Rajesh Mujumdar
- Produced by: Vijay Kondke
- Starring: Dada Kondke; Usha Chavan
- Cinematography: Chinnu Shah
- Edited by: Vishwas – Anil
- Music by: Raamlaxman
- Production company: Jyoti Arts Productions
- Release date: 1990 (India)
- Running time: 120 minutes
- Country: India
- Language: Marathi

Palva Palvi is a 1990 Indian Marathi-language comedy film directed by Dada Kondke and produced by Vijay Kondke under the banner of Jyoti Arts Productions. The film stars Dada Kondke and Usha Chavan in the leading roles. The music is composed by Raamlaxman and songs were provided by Mahendra Kapoor and Anupama Deshpande, recorded by B. N. Sharma.

== Plot ==
A local girl and a man fall in love, but they break up when the latter marries a wealthy man because of financial difficulties. The distraught boyfriend learns quickly that the girl is being mistreated by her spouse.

== Cast ==
- Dada Kondke as Shirpya
- Usha Chavan as Hausa
- Raghuvendra Kadkol as Munimji
- Dinanath Takalkar as Chole Guruji
- Dinkar Inamdar as Savkar
- Asha Patil as Mausi, Phulabai
- Bhalchandra Kulkarni as Hawaldar
- Vasant Shinde
- Rahul Solapurkar as Chabburao Nagre
- Shanta Inamdar as Kaku

== Soundtrack ==
Palva Palvi

Soundtrack album by Raamlaxman
- Released: 1991
- Studio: Bombay Sound Service
- Genre: Feature film soundtrack
- Length: 26:24
- Language: Marathi
- Label: Ishtar Music

Official audio
- Palva Palvi - Full Album on YouTube

The album is composed by Raamlaxman, sung by Mahendra Kapoor and Anupama Deshpande. The songs are recorded at the Bombay Sound Service by B. N. Sharma, while the sound recording is done by Ashwin Vavhal in Vijaya Cine Sound.

Track listing
No.	Title	Singer(s)	Length
1	"Nako Dhanda An Chakari"	Mahendra Kapoor	4:35
2	"Chincha Bor Keli Rataal"	Anupama Deshpande	4:17
3	"Tuzya Hiriche Pani Lai God"	Mahendra Kapoor, Anupama Deshpande	3:44
4	"Aga Hausa Bhar Divsa"	Mahendra Kapoor, Anupama Deshpande	4:54
5	"Bazaar Aahe Band"	Mahendra Kapoor, Anupama Deshpande	4:58
6	"Dena Ekach Muka"	Mahendra Kapoor, Anupama Deshpande	4:06
