= Rekha Kamat =

Indian Actress (1932–2022)

- Born: Kumud Sukhtankar; 17 August 1933; Mumbai, Maharashtra, India
- Died: 11 January 2022 (aged 89); Mumbai
- Education: SNDT college
- Occupation: Actress
- Spouse: G. R. Kamat (m. 1953)
- Relatives: Chitra Navathe (sister)

Rekha Kamat (born Kumud Sukhtankar; 17 August 1933– 11 January 2022) popularly known as Rekha was an Indian film and television actress.

== Early life and education ==
Kamat was born on 17 August 1933 in Mahim, Mumbai. Her father was a clerk in the Indian Navy. Her family consisted of seven siblings (five sisters and two brothers). Chitra Navathe (born as Kusum Sukhtankar) was her younger sister. Her father worked as a lipik at Army and Navy store in Mumbai.

She took her primary education (up to class IV) at a school in Kumbharwada area on Bhawani Shankar Road and matriculated in 1949 from General Education Society Chabildas. Further education from SNDT college. In 1953, Kamat married G.R. Kamat. She has two daughters, Sanjeevani and Madhavi.

She learned singing from Vasantrao Kulkarni.

G. D. Madgulkar gave both sisters their respective reel names, Rekha and Chitra, during the meet for 1954 Marathi film Lakhachi Goshta. This also became the occasion for G. R. Kamat to meet both sisters and know them.

== Plays ==
- Kalpavruksha Kannesathi
- Runanubadha
- Ekach Pyala
- Ghosht Janmantarichi
- Tarun Turka Mhatare Arka
- Sangeet Punyaprabhav as Kinkini
- Bhavbandha
- Sanshaykallol
- Saubhadra
- Dilya Ghari Tu Sukhi Raha
- Tujha Aahe Tujpashi
- Lagnachi Bedi
- Premachya Gava Jave
- Diva Jalu De Sari Raat
- Kaal Chakra

== Filmography ==
=== Films ===
| Year | Film | Role | Notes |
|---|---|---|---|
| 1950 | Ram Ram Pahuna | Lila | |
| 1952 | Lakhachi Gosht | Rekha | |
| 1953 | Kuberacha Dhan | Rekha | |
| 1953 | Kon Kunacha | Rekha | |
| 1953 | Mazi Zameen | Varsha | |
| 1954 | Kanchan Ganga | Kanchan | |
| 1955 | Ganget Ghoda Nhahale | Rani | |
| 1955 | Bal Maza Navsacha | Mother | |
| 1956 | Pasant Aahe Mulgi | Bride | |
| 1956 | Disata Tasa Nasta | Kishori | |
| 1957 | Gruh Devata | Rekha/Chitra | Double Role |
| 1960 | Jagachya Pathivar | | |
| 1963 | Baiko Maheri Jaate | Gautam's wife | |
| 1978 | Netaji Palkar | Palkar's wife | |
| 1979 | Sinhasan | Jivajirao's Wife | |
| 1982 | Smruti Chitre | Bhikutai | |
| 1986 | Dhakti Soon | Sasubai | |
| 2003 | Bhoot | Vishal's Neighbour | |
| 2004 | Aga Bai Arrecha! | Ranga's Aaji | |
| 2005 | Pak Pak Pakaak | Tribal old woman | |
| 2005 | Mi Tulas Tujhya Angani | | |
| 2006 | Shubhmangal Savdhan | Aaji | |
| 2010 | Har Har Mahadev | Aaji | |
| 2014 | Hawaa Hawaai | Harishchand's mother | |
| 2014 | Yashwantrao Chavan: Bakhar Eka Vaadalaachi | | |

=== Television ===
- Janta Janardhan (1998)
- Prapanch
- Eka Lagnachi Dusri Gosht

== Death ==
Rekha Kamat died on 11 January 2022, aged 89.
