= Lakhachi Gosht =

- Theatrical release poster
- Directed by: Raja Paranjape
- Story by: G. D. Madgulkar; G. R. Kamat
- Produced by: Raja Paranjape
- Starring: Raja Gosavi; Rekha Kamat; Chitra; Sharad Talwalkar
- Cinematography: Bal Bapat
- Edited by: Raja Thakur
- Music by: Sudhir Phadke
- Production company: Gajraj Chitra
- Distributed by: Pinacle Pictures
- Release date: 1952
- Running time: 133 minutes
- Country: India
- Language: Marathi

Lakhachi Gosht (transl. Story of One Lakh rupees) is a 1952 Indian Marathi-language comedy film directed and produced by Raja Paranjape, who also co-wrote the screenplay with G. D. Madgulkar. The film stars Raja Gosavi (debut), Sharad Talwalkar, Rekha Kamat, Chitra in the pivotal roles. The music is composed by Sudhir Phadke. Cinematography is done by Bal Bapat, and editing is handled by Raja Thakur. The film is a humorous comedy about two impoverished friends. When one of them develops feelings for a wealthy and attractive girl, her father offers the young guy a fortune, which he must spend in less than a month.

== Plot ==
In addition to being a poet, Shyam writes songs that a wealthy girl named Rekha sings on the radio. Ramnath, his friend who paints, develops feelings for Rekha. Gokhale, Rekha's father, approves of their union and offers him a one-lakh rupee budget to be used within a month to test his capacity to live a lavish lifestyle.

== Cast ==
- Raja Gosavi as Ram
- Rekha Kamat as Rekha
- Chitra as Saroj
- Raja Paranjape as Shyam
- Vinayak Sane as Doctor (left ear specialist)
- Indira Chitnis
- G. D. Madgulkar as Babasaheb Velinkar
- Ravindra
- Madan Mohan

== Soundtrack ==
Lakhachi Gosht

Soundtrack album by Sudhir Phadke
- Released: 1952
- Genre: Feature film soundtrack
- Length: 22:08
- Language: Marathi
- Label: Saregama India Limited

Official audio
- Lakhachi Gosht - Full Album on YouTube

The music album was composed by Sudhir Phadke and lyrics are written by G. D. Madgulkar.

=== Track listing ===
| No. | Title | Singer(s) | Length |
|---|---|---|---|
| 1 | "Dolyat Vaach Mazya" | Asha Bhosle, Sudhir Phadke | 3:21 |
| 2 | "Sang Tu Majha Hoshil Ka" | Asha Bhosle | 3:07 |
| 3 | "Eksheel Ka Re Majhey" | Asha Bhosle | 3:25 |
| 4 | "Pehley Bhandan" | Malati Pande | 2:46 |
| 5 | "Laaj Wate Aaj Bai" | Malati Pande | 3:03 |
| 6 | "Maza Hoshil Ka" | Asha Bhosle | 3:03 |
| 7 | "Tya Tithe Palikade" | Malati Pande | 3:09 |

== Reception ==
On 6 June 1958, Lakhachi Gosht was screened at the CWD Staff Institute. Over 500 workers and their families saw the movie.
