= Sunbai Oti Bharun Ja =

Sunbai Oti Bharun Ja - Marathi Movie
- Theatrical release poster
- Directed by: Dinkar D.Patil
- Produced by: Ram Karve
- Starring: Avinash Masurekar; Usha Chavan; Nilu Phule; Chandrakant Madre; Rajshekhar
- Music by: Bal Palsule
- Production company: Nava Maharashtra Films Pune
- Release date: 11 April 1979
- Country: India
- Language: Marathi

Sunbai Oti Bharun Ja is a Marathi movie released on 11 April 1979. Produced by Ram Karve and directed by Dinkar D.Patil.

== Cast ==
The cast includes Avinash Masurekar, Usha Chavan, Nilu Phule, Chandrakant Madre, and Rajshekhar.

== Soundtrack ==
The music is provided by Bal Palsule.

- "Suravatichya" - Asha Bhosle
