= Andheri Raat Mein Diya Tere Haath Mein =

1986 film by Dada Kondke

- Film poster
- Directed by: Dada Kondke
- Starring: Dada Kondke; Amjad Khan; Usha Chavan
- Release date: 16 May 1986
- Country: India
- Language: Hindi

Andheri Raat Mein Diya Tere Haath Mein (Hindi translation: In darkness of night, lamp in your hand, another meaning: In darkness of night, given in your hand) is a Hindi film made in 1986. The film is well known for its dual meaning dialogues like in all Dada Kondke films.

== Cast ==
- Akshay Vats

== Soundtrack ==
The film contains 6 songs. Among them 5 are duets of Mahendra Kapoor and Shaila Chikhale and one solo is sung by Shaila alone.

1. "Meri Choli Sila De O"
2. "Kas Ke Na Dalo"
3. "Petrol Dalun Ya"
4. "Andheri Raat Me"
5. "Teri Chun Chun"
6. "Aa Pahucha Teri Gali"
