= Ram Ram Gangaram =

1977 Indian film

- Poster
- Directed by: Dada Kondke
- Written by: Rajesh Mujumdar
- Produced by: Dada Kondke
- Starring: Dada Kondke; Ashok Saraf; Anjana Mumtaz; Usha Chavan; Ratnamala
- Cinematography: Arvind Lad
- Edited by: N. S. Vaidya
- Music by: Raamlaxman
- Production company: Dada Kondke Productions
- Release date: 5 March 1977
- Running time: 140 minutes
- Country: India
- Language: Marathi
- Budget: 20 lakhs
- Box office: 5 crore

Ram Ram Gangaram is a 1977 Indian Marathi-language drama film directed and produced by Dada Kondke under the banner of Dada Kondke Productions. It stars Kondke himself with Usha Chavan, Ashok Saraf and Anjana Mumtaz. The music is composed by Raamlaxman, editing is by N. S. Vaidya and cinematography is handled by Arvind Lad.

The film originally titled Gangaram Vis Kalmi reportedly made reference to Indira Gandhi's Twenty-Point Economic Programme during the Emergency, and the picture itself was meant to be a political satire. This may have contributed to the film's censoring issues. Under this new title, a partially reedited edition was released.

== Plot ==
After his wealthy uncle passes away, Gangaram inherits a million dollars and leaves his village to live in Bombay, where he must deal with his mother's ignorance and his uncle's dishonest manager. Disillusioned, he returns to the village and his beloved Gangi after giving up his money.

== Cast ==
- Dada Kondke as Gangaram
- Usha Chavan as Gangi
- Ashok Saraf as Mhamdu Khatik
- Anjana Mumtaz as Anjana
- Ratnamala as Sundarabai
- Bhagwan Dada as Gangaram's uncle
- Asha Patil as Gangaram's aunt
- Anant Dhumal
- Mohan Kotiwan
- Dinanath Takalkar
- Kundankumar

== Release ==
The film was released on 5 March 1977 in Maharashtra. The film achieved huge success on the box office, running successfully for 25 weeks.

== Soundtrack ==
Raam Laxman composed the music and sound recording is provided by B. N. Sharma. The lyrics of the songs was written by Dada Kondke and Rajesh Majumdar with singers Usha Mangeshkar, Mahendra Kapoor.

- "Bakricha Samdhyashni Laglay Lala" – Usha Mangeshkar
- "Mhora Ho Gangubai" – Usha Mangeshkar, Mahendra Kapoor
- "Ala Maharaja" – Mahendra Kapoor
- "Gala Varchi Khali Tujhya" - Usha Mangeshkar, Mahendra Kapoor
- "Naki Doli Chhaan" – Usha Mangeshkar
- "Gangoo Tarunya Tujh Befam" – Usha Mangeshkar, Mahendra Kapoor
