= Manorama Wagle =

Indian actress and singer (1929–2000)

Manorama Manohar Wagle (30 August 1929 – 26 August 2000) is an Indian theatre actress and singer known for her work in Marathi and Konkani stage productions.

== Early life and education ==
Wagle was born on 30 August 1929 in Bombay. After completing her schooling, she earned a degree in music from SNDT Women's University. To deepen her knowledge of classical music, she trained under classical vocalists including Pandit Govindrao Agni, B. R. Deodhar, Shyam Gogate, Pandit Jagannathbuwa Purohit, and K. G. Ginde. She also studied Natya Sangeet and light music under R. N. Paradkar.

== Career ==
Wagle began her theatrical career playing the role of Ramabai in the musical play Sangeet Satteche Gulam at a gathering organized by the women's branch of The Goa Hindu Association. Her subsequent stage performances included playing Gargi in Lagnachi Bedi, Krittika in Samsaykallol, Radhabai in the 1952 production of Khadashtak, Nati in Saubhadra, and a male character named Jagannath in the musical play Swamini.

In the Konkani play Swar Thamble Maifaliche, she played a lead courtesan character, performing genres such as ghazals and thumris. She also rendered lively lyrical poetry set to recorded background music composed by Bhaskar Chandavarkar in Ratnakar Matkari's play Panchechallis Hech Lagnach Vay.

Over the course of her career, Wagle performed around 35 distinct roles spanning children's theatre to modern theatre (*navanatya*). Her repertoire included participation in two children's plays, ten farces, seven comedies, three plays with all-female casts, one mono-act play, and four modern plays. Through her performances, she gained prominent recognition as a comedic artist on the Marathi stage. She also appeared in television advertisements, notably playing the role of "Sasubai" in a commercial for Ariel soap.

== Awards and accolades ==
Wagle won multiple awards:

- 1955–56: Best Acting Award and Silver Medal at the Bombay State Second Drama Competition for her role as Ragini in Khadashtak.
- Parshwanath Altekar Drama Competition: Promising Actress Award for her performance as Shantabai.
- 1966: Honored by the All India Marathi Natya Parishad.
- 1985: 'Dinkar Kamanna' Rasik Gold Medal, sponsored by Shankar Ghanekar.
- 1992: Gold Medal for television commercial for her performance in an Ariel soap advertisement.
- 1992: Best Acting Trophy for the Tamil-language version of the Ariel commercial.
- 1994–95: Honorary Fellowship (Manad Adhisadasyatva) conferred by the Gomantak Marathi Academy for her contributions to Marathi theatre.

== Death ==
Wagle died on 26 August 2000.
