= Shiv Sena (disambiguation) =

Shiv Sena was a Marathi regionalist and Hindu nationalist political party that split in 2022 into:

- Shiv Sena (Eknath Shinde), formed by a faction led by Eknath Shinde
- Shiv Sena (UBT), formed by a faction led by Uddhav Balasaheb Thackeray

Shiv Sena or Shivsena may also refer to various political parties:

- Nepal Shivsena, a Hindutva political party founded in 1999
- Shivsena Nepal, a Hindu political party founded in 1990
