= Raja Gosavi =

Indian actor

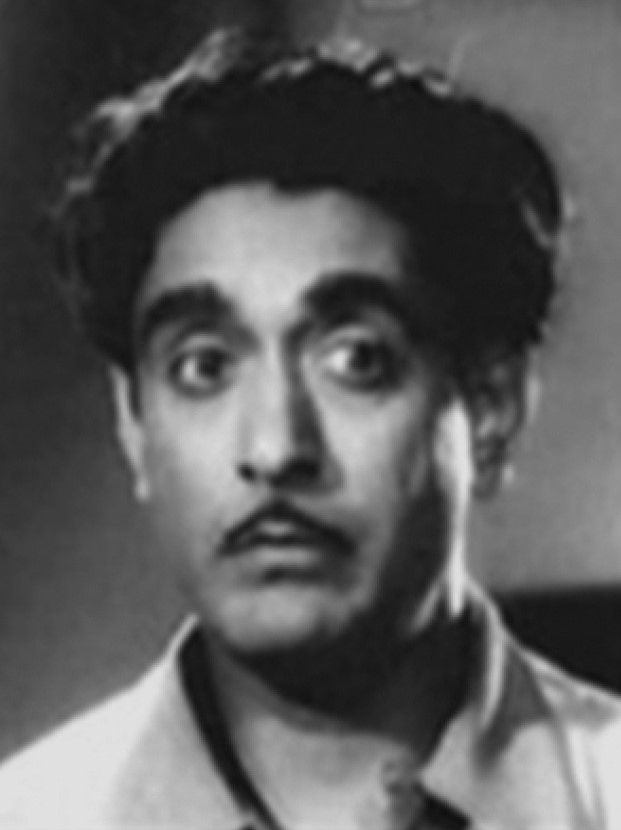
- Born: 28 March 1925; Satara district, British India
- Died: 28 February 1998 (aged 72); Pune, Maharashtra, India
- Occupations: Stage, film actor
- Years active: 1951-1998
- Spouse: Sunanda Gosavi (m. 1949)
- Children: 5 (including, Shama Deshpande)

Raja Gosavi (26 March 1925 – 28 February 1998) was a prominent Indian actor who became one of the most celebrated figures in Marathi cinema and theatre during the mid-20th century. Born in Siddheshwar Kuroli, Satara district, he is widely regarded as a pioneer of the "Golden Age" of Marathi films, particularly known for his impeccable comic timing and portrayal of the "common man."

Throughout a prolific career spanning several decades, Gosavi appeared in over 265 Marathi films and 5 Hindi films. He rose to popularity in the 1950s and 1960s, forming a cinematic pair with actor Sharad Talwalkar. He was best known for his light-hearted, romantic-comedy roles that resonated with the middle-class audience of Maharashtra.

== Early life ==
Gosavi was born on 28 March 1925 in Siddheshwar Kuroli, located in the Mandesh region of Satara district, Maharashtra. From a young age, he developed a keen interest in traditional performances, including Mela (folk troupes), singing, mimicry, and theatre. Driven by his passion for the arts, he left home to join Gangadharpanth Londhe’s theatrical troupe, the Rajaram Sangeet Mandali. While performing backstage duties with the troupe, Gosavi secured a job at Master Vinayak’s Prafull Pictures. During his tenure there, he took on various minor roles behind the scenes before making his acting debut with a small part in the film Chimukla Sansar in 1943. This was followed by minor appearances in films such as Gajabhau and the Hindi film Badi Maa.

His involvement in Gajabhau led to an acquaintance with the noted actor Damuanna Malvankar, through whom he joined the Prabhakar Natya Mandir theatre group. Initially employed as a prompter, he gradually transitioned into acting. His first stage role was a brief appearance as a station master's guard in the play Bhavbandhan. Gosavi continued to hone his craft by taking on small roles in numerous plays, including Udhaar Usanwar, Ekach Pyala, Saubhadra, Sanshaykallol, and Shivsambhav. Following his marriage in 1949, he worked as a booking clerk at the Bhanuvilas Theatre in Pune to support his family while continuing his work in theatre. He later served as an assistant director for Datta Dharmadhikari’s film Akher Jamla, in which he also played a minor role.

== Career ==
Gosavi acted in the role of Natsamrat in noted Marathi playwright Kusumagraj’s iconic & milestone Marathi play "Natsamrat" after Dr. Shriram Lagoo. Gosavi had made his film debut in Raja Paranjape's Lakhachi Gosht in 1952, along with Sharad Talwalkar (it was his debut too). Gosavi worked as a ticket-seller at Bhanuvilas Talkies, Pune for a few years and his film 'Lakhachi Goshta' opened there, which he promoted by selling the tickets both at the counter and in black. Raja Gosavi also plays lead role in one of the most famous play in Marathi "Soujanyachi Aishi Taishi".

== Filmography ==
Year	Film	Role	Notes
1952	Akher Jamla	Unnamed	Debut
1952	Lakhachi Gosht	Ram	
1952	Chimani Pakhar	Raju	
1952	Sagai	Gatekeeper	Hindi film
1952	Ek Hota Raja	Raja	
1953	Bolavita Dhani	Damodar	
1953	Aboli	Shrimant	
1953	Saubhagya		
1954	Savdhan	Shyam	
1954	Kalakar	Raju	
1954	Een Meena Sadeteen	Saumya	
1955	Sabse Bada Rupaiya	Shambhu	Hindi film
1955	Punvechi Raat	Surya	
1955	Haa Haa Hee Hee Ho Ho		
1955	Ganget Ghode Nhale	Rajendra	
1956	Pasant Aahe Mulgi	Vasudev	
1956	Gaath Padli Thaka Thaka	Pundalik	
1956	Devghar	Raja	
1956	Andhala Magto Ek Dola	Blind Man	
1957	Jhale Gele Visrun Ja	Ramesh	
1957	Bhabhi	Rajan	Hindi film
1957	Aaliya Bhogasi	Ramesh	
1957	Matevin Baal	Baal	
1957	Zhakli Mooth	Rajabhau Sahastrabuddhe	
1958	Don Ghadicha Daav	Vishwajeet	
1958	Sant Changdev	Sant Changdev	
1958	Mi Tulas Tujhya Angani	Yashwant	
1959	Yaala Jeevan Aise Naav		
1959	School Master		
1960	Kanyadaan	Kumar Inamdar	
1960	Sangat Jaldi Tujhi An Majhi		
1960	Jo Huwa So Bhul Jao	Master	Hindi film
1960	Paishacha Paus	Raja	
1960	Miya Bibi Razi	Makhan	Hindi film
1960	Lagna Jaato Me		
1960	Jagachya Pathivar	Amrutrao Deshmukh	
1960	Bhairavi		
1960	Avaghachi Sansar	P. Sadanand	
1960	Aadhi Kalas Mag Paaya		
1960	Baap Maza Brahmachari		
1960	Bhagyalaxmi		
1960	Chimnyanchi Shala		
1960	Priti Vivah		
1960	Soniyachi Paule		
1962	Vardakshina	Hansraj	
1962	Private Secretary	Sarang Guru	
1964	Vaat Chuklele Navre	Husband	
1964	Shriman Balasaheb	Balasaheb	
1964	Ek Do Teen	Srinivas	Hindi film
1965	Sudharlelya Baika	Raja Ghorpade	
1965	Kamapurta Mama		
1965	Chala Utha Lagna Kara		
1966	Tuch Majhi Vahini		
1966	Gurukilli		
1966	Sheras Savvasher		
1967	Kaka Mala Vachwa	Vijay Kumar	
1967	Daivala Janile Kuni		
1968	Yethe Shahane Rahtat	Mr. Shahane	
1968	Bai Mothi Bhagyachi	Sudhir Deshpande	
1968	Shrimant Mehuna Pahije		
1970	Ti Mi Navhech		
1971	Asel Majha Hari	Hari	
1971	Dher Chalaki Jinkara		Bhojpuri film
1975	Ya Sukhano Ya		
1976	Nag Champa		
1976	Ha Khel Sawalyancha	Ganu Mama	
1977	Asla Navra Nako Ga Bai	Sakharam Navre	
1977	Navra Maza Brahmachari	Hari	
1979	Ashtavinayak	Naru Mama	
1979	Janki	Tukaram Bapu	
1979	Deed Shahane	Gajanan	
1981	Totaya Aamdar	Aamdar	
1981	Manacha Kunku	Narayan	
1988	Pandharichi Wari	Nana	
1990	Ghabraiche Nahin	Munimji	
1990	Changu Mangu	Dadasaheb	
1991	Fat Fajeeti		

== Recognition ==
Raja Gosavi Road in T.M.V. Colony, Pune has been named in his honour.
