= Annasaheb Deulgaonkar =

Indian screenwriter, musician and film producer

- Born: 22 August 1920; Pune, Bombay Presidency, British Raj
- Died: 3 June 2008 (aged 87); Nagpur, Maharashtra, India
- Occupations: Screenwriter; musician; producer; distributor
- Awards: V. Shantaram Lifetime Achievement Award; Chitrabhusahan Award

Annasaheb Deulgaonkar (22 August 1920 – 3 June 2008) was an Indian screenplay writer, musician, film producer and distributor. The accolades he received in his career included V. Shantaram Award, Chitrabhushan Award and Gadima Award.

His famous independent films are Subhadra Haran, Thapadya, Saticha Vaan, Bhakt Pundalik, Sasurvasheen, Satichi Punyai, Lek Chalali Sasarla, Dhum Dhadaka, De Danadan, Khatyal Sasu Nathal Soon, Navra Bayko, Nashibwan, Maherchi Sadi, Kunku and Sakharpuda.

== Death ==
Deulgaonkar died on 3 June 2008 after a brief illness at the age of 87 in Nagpur, Maharashtra.
