= Ratnamala (actress) =

Indian actress (1924–1989)

- Born: Kamal Bhiwandkar; 1924
- Died: 24 January 1989 (aged 64–65)
- Occupation: Actress
- Spouse: Raja Pandit

Ratnamala (born as Kamal Bhiwandkar; 1924 – 24 January 1989) was an Indian film actress. She known for her roles in Marathi and Hindi films, particularly for portraying Dada Kondke's mother consistently throughout her films, earned the special title of "Dada Kondke's mother."

== Career ==
In 1938, at the age of fourteen, she starred in the Marathi film Bhagwa Zenda under the screen name Kamal Bhiwandkar, which was later changed to Ratnamala. Afterward, she assumed the role of the protagonist for the first time in the film Mazi Ladki (1939). Therefore, "Station Master" marked her debut in Hindi cinema.

Some of her famous major Marathi films are as follows. Rukhmini Swayamvar (1946), Maza Ram (1949), Gokulcha Raja (1950), Ramram Pavana (1950), Sangatye Aika (1959), Manini (1961), Kortachi Payari (1970), Rangapanchami (1961), Kali Baiko (1970), Mumbaicha Jawai (1970)

Ratnamala debuted as Dada Kondke's on-screen mother in his first Marathi film, Songadya in 1971. Following that, she reprised the role in subsequent films such as Ekta Jeev Sadashiv (1972), Harya Narya Zindabad (1972), Thapadya (1973), Pandu Havaldar (1975), Preet Tuzhi Majhi (1975), Ram Ram Gangaram (1977), Bot Lavin Tithe Gudgulya (1978), Lakshmi (1978), Hyoch Navra Pahije (1980), Aali Angavar (1982), Navre Sagle Gadhav (1982), Dhagala Lagli Kal (1985), and Muka Ghya Muka (1987).

== Personal life ==
Ratnamala was married to Raja Pandit.

== Death ==
Ratnamala died on 23 January 1989.
