= N. S. Vaidya =

Indian film director and editor

- Occupations: Director; editor
- Known for: Umbartha (1982)
- Awards: Zee Chitra Gaurav Lifetime Achievement Award (2009)

N. S. Vaidya was an Indian film director and editor who primarily worked in Marathi cinema. He made his directorial debut with the 1984 Marathi film Lek Chalali Sasarla. Vaidya edited several films of Dada Kondke including Songadya (1971), Ekta Jeev Sadashiv (1972), Pandu Havaldar (1975), Ram Ram Gangaram (1977). He collaborated with Mahesh Kothare in Dhum Dhadaka (1985) and De Danadan (1987).

== Selected filmography ==
=== As editor ===
- Songadya (1971)
- Ekta Jeev Sadashiv (1972)
- Samna (1974)
- Pandu Havaldar (1975)
- Ram Ram Gangaram (1977)
- Sinhasan (1979)
- Tere Mere Beech Mein (1984) – Hindi film
- Mumbaicha Faujdar (1984)
- Dhum Dhadaka (1985)
- Andheri Raat Mein Diya Tere Haath Mein (1986) – Hindi film
- De Danadan (1987)

=== As director ===
- Lek Chalali Sasarla (1984)
- Dhakti Sun (1986)
- Khatyaal Sasu Nataal Soon (1987)
- Nashibvan (1988)
- Navra Baiko (1989)
- Kuldeepak (1990)
- Dhumakool (1990)
- Bandal Baaz (1991)
- Shubhamkaroti (1993)
- Maza Saubhagya (1994)
