= Dada Kondke =

Indian actor (1932–1998)

- Born: Krishna Kondke; 8 August 1932; Bombay, Bombay Presidency, British India
- Died: 14 March 1998 (aged 65); Mumbai, Maharashtra, India
- Other name: Dada
- Occupations: Actor; director; lyricist; writer; singer
- Years active: 1969–1997
- Political party: Shiv Sena
- Spouse: Nalini Kondke (m. 1964; div. 1968)

Krishna "Dada" Kondke (8 August 1932 – 14 March 1998) was an Indian actor, lyricist and film producer. He was one of the most renowned personalities in Marathi film industry, famous for his double entendre dialogues in movies.

Kondke was born into a family owning a grocery shop and owners of chawls in Morbaug area of Mumbai which were let out. His family members were also foreman handling millworkers of Bombay Dyeing. Kondke was called "Dada", an honorific Marathi term meaning "elder brother", which led to his popular name Dada Kondke. From the early 1970s to the 1990s, Dada Kondke and his films dominated the Marathi film industry. Kondke was instrumental in sustaining audience interests in Marathi cinema. His films were low on aesthetic merit but high on animated comic performance that included double entendre. He was credited with introducing the genre of sex comedy to Marathi and Hindi cinema. Dada Kondke was entered in the Guinness Book of World Records for the highest number of films (nine) that achieved silver jubilee (running for 25 consecutive weeks).

== Early life ==
Kondke was a born into a Koli family of cotton-mill workers in a chawl in Naigaon, near Lalbaug, Mumbai. His family originally hailed from the village of Ingavali which was in the erstwhile Bhor State near Pune. Kondke and his migrant family retained close connections to their rural roots. As a youngster, Kondke was a rough kid who later on took up job in a local grocery retail chain called Apna Bazaar. He lost his parents to unfortunate events and the grieving process changed him profoundly. Left alone with his elder brother Dhondiram and his family to take care of him, these events made him focus more on the lighter side of life and make people laugh. Kondke started his entertainment career with a band and then worked as a stage actor. While working for the drama companies, Kondke toured throughout Maharashtra which helped him understand the local population's taste in entertainment.

== Personal life ==
Kondke was married to Nalini in 1964. The marriage was arranged by his elder brother, who was concerned about Kondke's mischievous behavior and sought to settle him down. At the time, Kondke was not keen on marriage as he had recently started a job at the Mumbai Kamgar and was beginning his stage career with the play Vichha Majhi Puri Kara. Due to the play's immense success, Kondke was frequently away on tours across Maharashtra, leaving his wife alone in Mumbai. Tensions eventually rose between the couple, leading to their legal separation in 1968. In his autobiography, Kondke remained private about the specific reasons for the fallout, though he noted that he paid a significant alimony following the divorce. Despite being married to Nalini, legendary he never had any officially acknowledged children. After the couple separated, claims surfaced regarding a daughter named Tejaswini (born 1969), but Kondke repeatedly rejected reports that he was her father.

Following his divorce, Kondke entered a long-term live-in relationship with actress Neela Kadwadkar (also known as Neelambari), who was a co-artist in his play Vichha Majhi Puri Kara. Neela, who came from a Devdasi background, became a close companion during a period when Kondke was reportedly dealing with mental stress and loneliness.

The two lived together as a couple for several years; however, the relationship was marked by turbulence. Kondke later discovered that Neela had been untruthful about her past—specifically that she already had children from a previous relationship. Despite the betrayal, Kondke initially stayed with her due to his emotional attachment, though the couple eventually split.

In his later years and through various interviews, Kondke revealed a brief but serious romantic chapter involving legendary playback singer Asha Bhosle. The two had grown very close during their professional collaborations, to the point where Bhosle reportedly proposed marriage. The proposal allegedly came with two conditions: that Kondke would have to leave the film industry and relocate. Kondke sought the advice of his mentor, director Bhalji Pendharkar, who advised him against the union, suggesting that their vastly different professional worlds and the required conditions would not lead to long-term happiness. Consequently, Kondke declined the proposal, and the two remained professional colleagues.

Throughout the height of his film career, Kondke was most frequently linked by the media to his long-standing leading lady, Usha Chavan. While they shared an iconic on-screen chemistry and worked together on numerous "Silver Jubilee" hits, both maintained that their relationship was primarily professional and based on deep mutual respect. Kondke was reportedly working on a film titled Jaraa Dheer Dhara with Chavan at the time of his death in 1998.

== Career ==
=== Early career ===
Kondke was involved in cultural activities of Seva Dal, a Congress party volunteers organization, where he started working in dramas. During this period came in contact with various Marathi stage personalities including writer, Vasant Sabnis. Later, Kondke started his own theatre company, and approached Sabnis to compose a drama script for him. Sabnis appreciated Dada's performance in Khankhanpurcha Raja (Translation: Bankrupt King), and agreed to write a modern Marathi language Tamasha or Loknatya (folk play). The drama was named Vichha Majhi Puri Kara (Translation: Fulfill my Wish). The drama went on to play over 1500 shows all over Maharashtra and made Dada a star.

=== 1969-1970s ===
Vichha Majhi Puri Kara brought Kondke into spotlight and in 1969, he debuted in Marathi movies through a role in Bhalji Pendharkar's movie Tambdi Maati which won the National Film Award for Best Feature Film in Marathi. He then turned producer with Songadya in 1971. Songadya was based on a story written by Vasant Sabnis, and was directed by Govind Kulkarni. He cast himself as Namya, the simpleton who falls for the glamour of Kalavati (played by Usha Chavan) who is a dancer. Some of the other people who played major characters in this movie were Nilu Phule, Ganpat Patil, Sampat Nikam and Ratnamala. Kondke retained his team from Songadya and delivered his next hit Ekta Jeev Sadashiv. Kondke's story-lines were always based on the simpleton engaged in lower level occupations. For example, Kondke portrayed himself as a Dhobi (Laundry Man) in Aali Angavar, Poor Farmer in Songadya, and a Police Constable in Pandu Havaldar. Kondke is known for using the same team of actors, technicians and playback singers to repeat the formula for success that he believed he had got from his debut film. Many of his movies, produced under the "Kamakshi Pictures" banner, had Usha Chavan as the lead actress, Rajesh Mujumdar as screen play writer (from Pandu Hawaldar onward), Raamlaxman as music director, Jayawant Kulkarni and later Mahendra Kapoor as the male playback singer, Usha Mangeshkar as the female playback singer, and Bal Mohite as the chief assistant. Kondke often employed the veteran actor-dancer, Bhagwan Dada in dancing sequences in his films. In 1976, Dada Kondke directed and starred in Tumcha Aamcha Jamala, alongside Anjana, Ashok Saraf and Shanta Tambe. The film emerged as the highest-grossing Marathi film of the year and won the Maharashtra State Film Award for Best Film II, while Kondke received the award for Best Director.

His next film, Ram Ram Gangaram (1977), starring Usha Chavan, Bhagwan Dada, Ashok Saraf and Anjana, was also a commercial success and completed a silver jubilee run at the box office. In the same year, Kondke appeared in the Gujarati-language film Chandu Jamadar, an adaptation of his Marathi film Pandu Havaldar. The film featured Laxmi Chhaya, Firoz Irani and Sarala Yeolekar in prominent roles. In 1978, Kondke released Bot Lavin Tithe Gudgulya, co-starring Usha Chavan and Padma Chavan. The film became a golden jubilee hit, while its song “Dhagala Lagali Kala” gained immense popularity and continues to remain well known among Marathi audiences.

=== 1980s ===
In 1980, Dada directed and starred in Hyoch Navra Pahije (transl. “This Is the Husband I Want”). The film’s title was considered a satirical response to V. Shantaram’s earlier film Asla Navra Nako Ga Bai (transl. “Woman, Don’t Want Such a Husband”), reportedly intended as a playful dig at Shantaram. Unlike Kondke’s previous films, Hyoch Navra Pahije featured a considerable amount of English dialogue, leading him to cast Jayshree T. as the female lead instead of his frequent collaborators Usha Chavan and Anjana. The film also starred Bhagwan Dada, Ratnamala, Sharad Talwalkar and Dhumal, and went on to become a silver jubilee success.

In 1981, Kondke appeared in the Gujarati-language film Ram Ram Amtharam, alongside Laxmi Chhaya and Kamini Bhatia. The film was an adaptation of his 1977 Marathi film Ram Ram Gangaram. In 1982, Kondke directed Aali Angavar, starring Usha Chavan in the lead role. The film received the Maharashtra State Film Award for Best Film, while Kondke won the award for Best Director.

From 1984 onward, Dada began focusing on Hindi-language cinema as a producer, director and actor. His first Hindi film, Tere Mere Beech Mein (1984), featured Kondke himself alongside Usha Chavan and Amjad Khan in lead roles. The film was an adaptation of his Marathi film Ram Ram Gangaram and performed successfully at the box office. In 1985, Kondke produced, directed and acted in Khol De Meri Zuban, co-starring Mehmood and Bandini Mishra. This was followed by Andheri Raat Mein Diya Tere Haath Mein (1986), starring Usha Chavan and Amjad Khan. The film attracted controversy because of its title and failed to achieve commercial success.

Kondke later returned to Marathi cinema with Muka Ghya Muka, featuring Usha Chavan in the lead role. The film went on to complete a silver jubilee run. In 1988, he directed and acted in the Hindi film Aage Ki Soch, starring Swapna, Shakti Kapoor and Raza Murad. In 1989, Kondke released the Marathi film Mala Gheun Chala, starring Madhu Kambikar, Dilip Kulkarni and Satish Shah. However, the film failed commercially at the box office.

=== 1990s ===
In 1990, Dada produced, directed and acted in the Marathi film Palva Palvi, alongside Usha Chavan, Asha Patil and Rahul Solapurkar. The film performed well at the box office. In 1992, he directed and starred in Yeu Ka Gharat?, featuring Usha Naik in the lead role. Two years later, he released Sasarcha Dhotar (transl. “Father-in-law’s Dhoti”) in 1994. The title was reportedly intended as a satirical response to his nephew Vijay Kondke’s successful 1991 film Maherchi Sadi (transl. “Mother’s Home Saree”), during a period when the two were said to be estranged.

In 1995, Kondke directed and acted in Vajavu Ka?, once again starring Usha Chavan. The film marked the final release of his career. Prior to his death in 1998, he was also working on an unreleased film titled Jaraa Dheer Dhara.

== Filmography ==
| Year | Film | Role | Language | Notes |
|---|---|---|---|---|
| 1969 | Tambdi Maati | Nana | Marathi | |
| 1971 | Songadya | Namdeo (Namya) | Marathi | |
| 1972 | Ekta Jeev Sadashiv | Sadashiv | Marathi | |
| 1973 | Andhala Marto Dola | Shripati (Shirpya) | Marathi | |
| 1975 | Pandu Havaldar | Pandu Hawaldar | Marathi | Maharashtra State Film Award for Best Director |
| 1976 | Tumcha Aamcha Jamala | Krushna | Marathi | Maharashtra State Film Award for Best Director |
| 1977 | Ram Ram Gangaram | Gangaram | Marathi | |
| 1977 | Chandu Jamadar | Chandu | Gujarati | |
| 1978 | Bot Lavin Tithe Gudgulya | Chhotu | Marathi | Maharashtra State Film Award for Best Director |
| 1980 | Hyoch Navra Pahije | Gopal (Gopi) | Marathi | |
| 1982 | Aali Angawar | Janardan (Janya) | Marathi | Maharashtra State Film Award for Best Director |
| 1984 | Tere Mere Beech Mein | Gangaram | Hindi | |
| 1985 | Khol De Meri Zuban | Gangaram | Hindi | |
| 1986 | Andheri Raat Mein Diya Tere Haath Mein | Gullu | Hindi | |
| 1988 | Mukaa Ghya Mukaa | Mukund (Mukya) | Marathi | |
| 1988 | Aage Ki Soch | Ganpat | Hindi | |
| 1989 | Mala Gheun Chala | Ganpat (Ganpa) | Marathi | |
| 1990 | Palva Palvi | Shripati (Shirpya) | Marathi | |
| 1992 | Yeu Kaa Gharaat? | Dharma | Marathi | |
| 1994 | Saasarche Dhotar | Raja | Marathi | |
| 1995 | Vajavu Ka? | Govinda | Marathi | |
| 2000 | Le Chal Apne Sang | Himself | Hindi | (dedicated to the memory of) produced by Sunita Kondke |

=== Featured songs ===
As a lyricist he wrote multiple songs on animals

- "Manasa Paris Mendhara Bari" (meaning 'sheep are much better than human beings') in the film Ekta Jeev Sadashiv
- "Labaad Landga Dhwang Kartay" (on the cunningness of foxes) in Ekta Jeev Sadashiv
- "Chalara Waghya" (dog) in the film Tumcha Aamcha Jamala
- "Jodi Bailachi Khillari" (bullocks) in the film Mala Gheun Chala
- "Bakricha Samdyasni Laglay Lala" (goat) in the film Ram Ram Gangaram

Bhajans

- "Anjanichyā Sutā Tulā Rāmācha Vardān" in the film Tumcha Aamcha Jamala

== Political career ==
Balasaheb Thackeray, leader of the party Shiv Sena, helped Kondke with screenings of Songadya, when Dev Anand's film, Tere Mere Sapne was released, and resulted in movie theatres replacing showings of Songadya, for it. The move angered Marathi-speaking moviegoers, as many were eager to watch Kondke's film. The news of the replacement reached the Sena Bhavan, and after a meeting, party members and locals marched to the theatre to protest the move. Thackeray's justification for supporting Kondke was that he was a Marathi Māṇūs (Man). In return, Kondke, with Gajanan Shirke, helped found the Chitrapat Shakha.

Kondke was impressed with Thackeray's charisma and had toured Maharashtra to attract voters towards Shiv Sena. Kondke was a very active member of Shiv Sena and was able to influence many areas of rural Maharashtra due to his popularity and way of making fiery speeches to impress the masses.
