= Raamlaxman =

Indian composer, pianist, musician, and accordionist (1942–2021)

- Also known as: Raam–Laxman
- Born: Vijay Patil; 16 September 1942
- Died: 22 May 2021 (aged 78) Nagpur, Maharashtra, India
- Genres: Film scores, dance, classical
- Occupations: Composer; music director; arranger
- Instruments: Vocals, drums, piano, accordion
- Years active: 1975–2021

Raamlaxman was an Indian musical duo consisting of Vijay Patil (16 September 1942 – 22 May 2021) who performed under the name Laxman, and Surendra who passed in 1976. However, Patil continued to work under the original name. Laxman, was an Indian composer, pianist, musician and accordionist. Raamlaxman is most famous for his work with Rajshri Productions of Hindi films. In a career spanning four decades, Raamlaxman worked in 150 films in Hindi, Marathi and Bhojpuri, and worked with noted film director of his time, notably Manmohan Desai, Mahesh Bhatt, GP Sippy, Anil Ganguly and Sooraj Barjatya. He composed music for their hit films like Pandu Havaldar (1975), Maine Pyar Kiya (1989), Hum Aapke Hain Koun..! (1994), Hum Saath Saath Hain (1999), Muskurahat (1992), Police Public (1990), 100 Days (1991). His first film was Agent Vinod (1977)

== Early life and training ==
Laxman (Patil) took his initial music lessons from his father and uncle. He later studied music at the Bhatkhande Shikshan Sansthan. Raamlaxman started his own orchestra named Amar-Vijay (Amar was his son's name).

== Career ==
The famous comedian, Dada Kondke was impressed by him and approached him to compose the music for his Marathi comedy Pandu Havaldar. Vijay, with his friend Raam, composed the music that went on to become a raging hit, and their alliance with Kondke did not break until the latter's death. Later, he did films with Manmohan Desai, Mahesh Bhatt, G.P.Sippy, Anil Ganguly and others. His favourite singers were Shailendra Singh and Usha Mangeshkar, while his favourite lyricist was Asad Bhopali. His releases were mostly with Ravindra Rawal. Although he frequently collaborated with Lata Mangeshkar and produced some of the biggest hits in his career.

In 1981, Raamlaxman collaborated with Ravindra Rawal for movie Hum Se Badhkar Kaun. Song "Deva O Deva Ganpati Deva" got famous during that period. He has also given music for movies Hum Se Hai Zamana (1983), Woh Jo Hasina (1983), Deewana Tere Naam Ka (1987) and Aage Ki Soch (1988).

Raamlaxman is the "Laxman" of duo composers "Raam-Laxman". In 1976, "Raam" (his partner Surendra) died immediately after signing the film Agent Vinod (1977). Laxman continued to retain Raam's name in Marathi as well as Hindi films.

In the year 1988, Raamlaxman got a major break with Sooraj Barjatya's Maine Pyar Kiya (1989). His composition earned him filmfare award for Best Music Director. The film set a record at its time for the most Filmfare awards won by a single film with seven, from thirteen nominations. It was also the first film to win the three major awards in the music category (Best Music Director, Male Playback Singer, Best Lyricist). The film also launched S. P. Balasubrahmanyam as voice of new actor Salman Khan from period 1989 to 1994.

Laxman scored a major hit once again with superhit film Hum Aapke Hain Koun..! (1994). His collaboration with Sooraj Barjatya went on and he gave good hits in the film Hum Saath Saath Hain (1999).

He died at his residence in Nagpur on 22 May 2021, due to COVID-related complications and cardiac arrest, at the age of 78.

== Discography ==
| Year | Film | Notes | Sales | Ref |
|---|---|---|---|---|
| 1975 | Pandu Havaldar | Marathi film | | |
| 1976 | Tumcha Aamcha Jamala | Marathi film | | |
| 1977 | Ram Ram Gangaram | Marathi film | | |
| 1977 | Agent Vinod | | | |
| 1978 | Bot Lavin Tithe Gudgulya | Marathi film | | |
| 1979 | Taraana | | | |
| 1979 | Saanch Ko Aanch Nahin | | | |
| 1981 | Hum Se Badhkar Kaun | | | |
| 1981 | Jiyo To Aise Jiyo | | | |
| 1982 | Ustadi Ustad Se | | | |
| 1982 | Bezubaan | | | |
| 1982 | Sun Sajna | | | |
| 1982 | Tumhaare Bina | | | |
| 1983 | Woh Jo Hasina | | | |
| 1983 | Dard-E-Dil | | | |
| 1983 | Gumnaam Hai Koi | | | |
| 1983 | Hum Se Hai Zamana | | | |
| 1983 | Sun Meri Laila | | | |
| 1983 | Mujhe Vachan Do | | | |
| 1984 | Tere Mere Beech Mein | | | |
| 1985 | Patthar | | | |
| 1985 | Yeh Kaisa Farz | | | |
| 1986 | Anadi Khiladi | | | |
| 1986 | Andheri Raat Mein Diya Tere Haath Mein | | | |
| 1987 | Deewana Tere Naam Ka | | | |
| 1987 | Kaun Kitne Paani Mein | | | |
| 1988 | Aage Ki Soch | | | |
| 1988 | Vasna Ki Aag | | | |
| 1989 | Paap Ki Sazaa | | | |
| 1989 | Khol De Meri Zuban | | | |
| 1989 | Maine Pyar Kiya | | 10,000,000 | |
| 1990 | Police Public | | | |
| 1990 | Palva Palvi | Marathi film | | |
| 1991 | Patthar Ke Phool | | 2,500,000 | |
| 1991 | 100 Days | | 1,800,000 | |
| 1991 | Baharon Ki Manzil | | | |
| 1992 | 101 Days | | | |
| 1992 | I Love You | | | |
| 1992 | Mehboob Mere Mehboob | | | |
| 1992 | Phoolwati | | | |
| 1992 | Saatwan Aasmaan | | | |
| 1992 | Muskurahat | | | |
| 1993 | Dil Ki Baazi | | | |
| 1993 | Anmol | | | |
| 1993 | Antim Nyay | | | |
| 1993 | Pyar Ka Tarana | | | |
| 1993 | When Love Calls | | | |
| 1994 | Prem Shakti | | | |
| 1994 | Karan | | | |
| 1994 | Pathreela Raasta | | | |
| 1994 | Fauj | | | |
| 1994 | Kanoon | | | |
| 1994 | Jazbaat | | | |
| 1994 | Hum Aapke Hain Koun..! | | 12,000,000 | |
| 1995 | Vartmaan | | | |
| 1996 | Nirbhay | | | |
| 1996 | Megha | | | |
| 1997 | Lav Kush | | | |
| 1999 | Dulhan Banoo Main Teri | | | |
| 1999 | Hum Saath Saath Hain | | 1,800,000 | |
| 1999 | Manchala | | | |
| 2000 | Le Chal Apne Sang | | | |
| 2002 | Hum Pyaar Tumhi Se Kar Baithe | | | |
| 2002 | Inth Ka Jawab Patthar | | | |
| 2003 | Aissa Kyon | | | |
| 2016 | Brahmaand Nayak Saibaba | | | |
| | Total sales | | 28,100,000 | |

== See also ==
- List of Bollywood films
