= Asha Patil =

Indian actress (1936–2016)

- Born: 1936; Rukadi, Kolhapur
- Died: 18 January 2016 (aged 79–80); Kolhapur, India
- Occupation: Actress
- Years active: 1960–2008
- Awards: Jeevan Gaurav Award

Asha Patil (1936 – 18 January 2016) was an Indian actress of Marathi film, television and theatre. She became famous for playing the character of "Aaye" (Mother) for veteran actor late Dada Kondke, including Tumcha Aamcha Jamala, Bot Lavin Titha Gudgulya, Ram Ram Gangaram, Vajvu Ka, Palva Palvi and Sasarch Dhotar.

== Filmography ==
=== Films ===
- Antaricha Diwa (1960)
- Chandal Choukadi (1961)
- Manasala Pankha Astat (1961)
- Shahir Parshuram (1962)
- Rangalya Ratri Asha (1962)
- Sant Nivrutti Dnyandev (1964)
- Kamapurata Mama (1965)
- Sadhi Mansa (1965)
- Preeti Vivah (1981)
- Samna (1974)
- Karava Tasa Bharav (1975)
- Soyarik (1975)
- Tumcha Aamcha Jamala (1978)
- Bot Lavin Tithe Gudgulya (1978)
- Sasurwashin (1978)
- Banya Bapu (1977)
- Ram Ram Gangaram (1977)
- Padarachya Sawalit (1977)
- Sulavarachi Poli (1979)
- Mantryachi Sun (1980)
- Utavala Navara (1989)
- Gavran Gangu (1989)
- Palva Palvi (1990)
- Shubha Bol Narya (1990)
- Maherchi Sadi (1991)
- Sasarcha Dhotar (1994)
- Putravati (1996)
- Vajavu ka
- Ghe Bharari (2008)
- Maherchi Pahuni

=== Play & Role ===
- To Mi Navhech (1962)
- Ekach Pyala (1976)

== See also ==
- Marathi cinema
