= Vasant Sabnis =

Indian writer

- Born: 6 December 1923; Pandharpur, British India
- Died: 15 October 2002 (aged 78)
- Occupation: Writer
- Works: Songadya; Ashi Hi Banwa Banwi; Ekta Jeev Sadashiv; Gadhvacha Lagna
- Children: Rani Sabnis Patil
- Relatives: Nalesh Dattatraya Patil (writer/poet/ad man)

Vasant Sabnis (6 December 1923 – 15 October 2002) was an Indian Marathi writer from Maharashtra, India.He wrote Marathi plays and screen scripts and dialogues for Marathi movies.

== Early life ==
Sabnis was born on 6 December 1923. He received his high school education in Pandharpur and college education in Pune. After graduation, he joined Maharashtra state government's information and public relations department.

== Selected filmography ==
Humor was the forte of Sabnis's writings.

He wrote plays, including Vichcha Majhi Puri Kara (विच्छा माझी पुरी करा), and screen scripts and dialogues for movies and dramas including the following:

- Songadya (सोंगाड्या)
- Bin Kamacha Navra (बिन कामाचा नवरा )
- Ekata Jeev Sadashiv (एकटा जीव सदाशीव)
- Gela Madhav Kunikade (गेला माधव कुणीकडे)
- Harya Narya Zindabad (हर्या नार्या झिंदाबाद)
- Banyabapu (बन्याबापू)
- Choricha Mamla (चोरीचा मामला)
- Gammat Jammat (गम्मतजम्मत)
- Jamla Ho Jamla
- Gadhvacha Lagna (गाढवाचं लग्न)
- Vajva re Vajva (वाजवा रे वाजवा)
- Navri Mile Navryala
- Eka Peksha Ek
- Ashi Hi Banwa Banwi (अशी ही बनवाबनवी)
