= Sharad Talwalkar =

Indian actor

- Born: 1 November 1918; Ahmednagar, Bombay Presidency, British India
- Died: 22 August 2001 (aged 82); Pune, Maharashtra, India
- Occupation: Actor
- Style: Comedy; dark comedy; fiction–real life
- Spouse: Usha Watve (m. 1950)
- Children: 1

Sharad Talwalkar (1 November 1918 – 22 August 2001) was an Indian film and television actor who led the Marathi film industry and theatre for many years. He had performed in more than 180 Marathi films.

== Childhood ==
He had a passion for acting from his childhood, he acted in plays in Bhave High School where he studied. When he reached college, he along with acting started directing plays. Keshavrao Date was impressed by young Talwalkar's talent, and hence in 1938 Keshavrao Date selected him for Natya Vikas Company.

== Debut and early years ==
Sharad Talwalkar had made his film debut in Datta Dharmadhikari's 'Akher Zamla' in 1952 with Raja Gosavi (it was his debut too), Talwalkar played a comic role in that movie. This movie was a hit and the duo Raja Gosavi and Sharad Talwalkar emerged as a comic pair, and thereafter acted together in many movies. In his early days Sharad Talwalkar worked mainly in Mumbai, Pune & Kolhapur. 'Lakhachi Gosta' and 'Pedgaonche Shahane' were films in his early days. Avaghachi Sansar was his first colour film. The most interesting amongst these is his career as a theater actor. He has acted in around 45 plays. Ekach Pyala, Gharo Ghari Heech Bomb, Lagnachi Bedi are some of his prominent plays.

== Selected filmography ==
- Lakhachi Gosht (1952)
- Akher Zamla (1952)
- Pedgaonche Shahane (1952)
- Avaghachi Sansar (1960)
- Manini (1968)
- Ekti (1968)
- Mumbaicha Jawai (1970)
- Ashtavinayak (1979)
- Javai Vikat Ghene Aahe (1973)
- Rangalya Ratri Asha (1962)
- Dhoom Dhadaka (1985)
- Lek Chalali Sasarla (1984)
- Mumbaicha Faujdar (1984)
- Amhi Doghe Raja Rani (1986)
- Tu Tithe Me (1998)

== Death ==
On the evening of 22 August 2001, at the age of 82, and Sharad Talwalkar died due to a heart attack in his home in Pune. His grandson Kapil Talwalkar is an Indian American actor and musician.

== Awards ==
He had received several awards for his roles in films like Ekti, Mumbaicha Javai, Jawai Vikat Ghene Aahe, Rangalya Ratri Asha, Dhoom Dhadaka, Lek Chalali Sasarla and Tu Tithe Me were some of his latest films.
