= Usha Chavan =

Indian actress

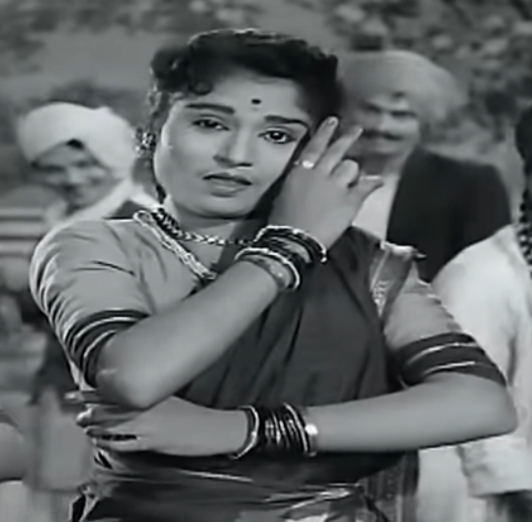
- Chavan in 1964
- Born: Usha Chavan; 18 August 1950 (age 76); Pune, Maharashtra, India
- Occupation: Actress
- Years active: 1964–1995
- Spouse: Dattatray KaduDeshmukh (m. 1970)
- Children: 1
- Honours: V. Shantaram Lifetime Achievement Award

Usha Chavan (born 18 August 1950) is an Indian actress who appears predominantly in Marathi films. Acknowledged as one of the finest actresses in Marathi cinema. she is the recipient of several accolades, including four Maharashtra State Film Awards and two Filmfare Awards Marathi. Best known for her comic timing and glamorous roles, especially in partnership with Dada Kondke. The pair became one of the most iconic duos in Marathi cinema. She remembered as one of the most popular leading ladies of Marathi cinema in the 1970s–80s. In 2021, she was honoured with the V. Shantaram Award, Maharashtra's highest award in the field of cinema.

In 1971 Usha Chavan made her debut with the film Songadya. She has also acted in Telugu film such as Durdabitta, and in the Hindi film Shirdi Ke Sai Baba. She has made several appearances with Dada Kondke in Marathi comedy films.

== Early life ==
Chavan was born on 18 August 1950 in Pune, Maharashtra. She grew up in a culturally vibrant household, with her family deeply involved in Loknatya. Her mother, Hirabai Chavan, acted in silent films alongside Prithviraj Kapoor. Raised in Pune, she was immersed in performing arts from an early age. She was educated only up to the 7th standard. She showed an interest in singing from a young age and would often perform songs at village fairs (jatras). Over time, she realised that dance offered better financial opportunities than singing. However, due to limited resources, she was unable to receive formal training in dance. Determined to pursue her passion, she began teaching herself by listening to songs on the radio after returning from school and practising dance on her own. She began her entertainment career as a background dancer, helping her gain confidence and visibility in the field.

== Personal life ==
She married Dattatray KaduDeshmukh on 15 May 1970. The couple have a son, Hridaynath Kadu-Deshmukh.

She was frequently associated with actor and filmmaker Dada Kondke, with whom she appeared in several commercially successful Marathi films. She claimed that Kondke had wished to marry her, but that she had declined. She also alleged that their differences subsequently influenced the portrayal of her in his autobiography, Ekta Jeev.

== Career ==
Chavan began her career in performing arts with a tamasha troupe before moving to stage plays. One of her popular plays was Lavangi Mirchi Kolhapurchi alongside Arun Sarnaik. She made her film debut as a lead actress with Kela Ishara Jata Jata (1965), where her performance and dance skills were well received by audiences. Prior to this, she had appeared as a background dancer in Sawaal Majha Aika! (1964). Her entry into films as a lead actress came unexpectedly when director Anant Mane offered her the role, initially intended for Jayshree Gadkar. The film’s success brought her recognition, and at the 5th Maharashtra State Film Awards she won the award for Best Supporting Actress for Sawaal Majha Aika!.

Chavan went on to work in several Marathi films including Khandobachi Aan, Mukkam Post Dhebewadi, Ashi Rangali Ratra, and Kortacha Pairi. She rose to further prominence with Songadya (1971), opposite Dada Kondke. Their on-screen pairing became highly popular and led to a series of commercially successful films such as Ekta Jeev Sadashiv (1971), Pandu Havaldar (1975), Ram Ram Gangaram (1977), Bot Lavin Tithe Gudgulya (1978), Palva Palvi (1990), Yeu Ka Gharat (1992), Sasarch Dhotar (1994), and Vajvu Ka?. Apart from her collaborations with Kondke, she worked with other noted actors including Ganpat Patil in Sakhya Sajna, where the film succeeded without a conventional hero, and Nilu Phule in Sonaran Tochla Kan and Bapadya. Her role in Ranpakhre received critical appreciation and awards. She also appeared in Hindi films such as Shirdi Ke Sai Baba, Tere Mere Beech Mein, and Andheri Raat Mein Diya Tere Haath Mein. She produced and directed two Marathi films, Gauracha Navra and Dharpakad. She received Maharashtra State Film Awards for her performances in Kela Ishara Jata Jata, Bot Lavin Tithe Gudgulya, and Choravar Mor.

== Filmography ==
Year	Film	Role	Ref(s)
1964	Sawaal Majha Aika!	Tamasgir	
1965	Kela Ishaara Jaata Jaata	Shevanti	
1968	Khandobachi Aan	Bakula Batisgaokarin	
1969	Mukkam Post Dhebewadi	Gulabjaan Chikhlikar	
1970	Ashi Rangli Raat	Akka	
1970	Mala Tumchi Mhana	Shevanta Solapurkarin	
1971	Songadya	Kalavati	
1972	Ekta Jeev Sadashiv	Kalavati	
1973	Sonarane Tochale Kaan	Bakula	
1975	Pandu Hawaldar	Paro Kelewali	
1975	Varat	Ratna	
1975	Karava Tasa Bharava	Manjula/ Khilabai	
1976	Pudhari	Radha	
1976	Choricha Mamla	Ratna	
1977	Ram Ram Gangaram	Gangi	
1977	Shirdi Ke Sai Baba	Laxmi	Hindi
1977	Dagaa	Anjana	
1977	Naav Motha Lakshan Khota	Unnamed	Cameo appearance
1977	Navra Maza Brahmachari	Aanje	
1978	Bhairu Pehelwan Ki Jai	Shyama	
1978	Bot Lavin Tithe Gudgulya	Maina	
1979	Sunbai Oti Bharun Ja	Champa	
1979	Ashtavinayak	Herself	Special appearance
1980	Ranpakhre	Maina	
1980	Paij	Indu	
1980	Mantrayachi Sun	Usha	
1980	Zidd	Sugandha Sakhre	
1980	Choravar Mor	Shanta & Kanta	
1980	Sulavarchi Poli	Bhingari	
1981	Soon Mazi Laxmi	Laxmi	
1981	Mosambi Narangi	Mosambi	
1981	Ganimi Kawa	Chandra	
1981	Khoon Ki Takkar	Laxmi	Hindi
1981	Tere Mere Beech Mein	Gangi	Hindi
1982	Dalimbi	Dalimbi	
1982	Aali Aangavar	Jani	
1983	Thingi	Usha	
1984	Jugalbandi	Shevanti	
1984	Dhagala Lagli Kal	Maina	
1986	Andheri Raat Mein Diya Tere Haath Mein	Banjaran	Hindi
1987	Muka Ghya Muka	Chandrakka	
1988	Gauracha Navra	Gaura Deshmukh	
1990	Palva Palvi	Hausa	
1992	Dhar Pakad	Radha	
1994	Sasarcha Dhotar	Rani	
1995	Vajau Ka	Nanda	

== Awards ==
Year	Award	Film	Category	Ref.
1965	Maharashtra State Film Awards	Sawaal Majha Aika!	Best Supporting Actress	
1966	Maharashtra State Film Awards	Kela Ishara Jata Jata	Best Supporting Actress	
1977	Filmfare Awards Marathi	Naav Motha Lakshan Khota	Best Actress	
1979	Maharashtra State Film Awards	Bot Lavin Tithe Gudgulya	Best Actress	
1980	Maharashtra State Film Awards	Choravar Mor	Best Actress	
1980	Filmfare Awards Marathi	Ranpakhare	Best Actress	
2021	Government of Maharashtra	Lifetime Achievement	V. Shantaram Award	

== See also ==
- List of Marathi film actresses
