= Nilu Phule =

Indian actor (1930–2009)

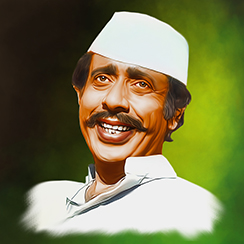
- Born: Nilkanth Krushnaji Phule; 4 April 1930; Poona, Bombay Presidency, British India
- Died: 13 July 2009 (aged 79); Pune, Maharashtra, India
- Occupation: Actor
- Years active: 1968–2009
- Spouse: Rajani Phule (m. 1975)
- Children: 3
- Awards: Sangeet Natak Akademi Award (1991)

Nilu Phule (Marathi pronunciation: [niɭuː pʰuleː]; 4 April 1930 – 13 July 2009) was an Indian actor known for his roles in Marathi movies and Marathi theatre. Nilu Phule acted in around 250 Marathi and Hindi movies during his film career. He was most prominently seen playing the roles of notorious villains in the movies. He is recipient of numerous accolades including a Filmfare Award Marathi, four Maharashtra State Film Awards, Sangeet Natak Akademi Award and Zee Chitra Gaurav Lifetime Achievement Award.

Phule was also a social worker, and was associated with Rashtra Seva Dal.

== Early life ==
Phule was born in 1930 in Pune as Nilkanth Krushnaji Phule in a Mali (gardener) family. He is the great grandson of Indian social reformer Jyotirao Phule. He was involved in the independence movement. According to his interview in a serial 'Vastraharan' on a Marathi channel, he was a freedom fighter from Pune.

Phule's first job was that of a gardener at the Armed Forces Medical College, Pune aged 17. He used to get a salary of Rs. 80 per month, out of which, he used to donate Rs. 10 to the Rashtriya Seva Dal, a social organization he was involved with. He wanted to pursue his gardening career forward, but due to lack of financial support, he could not start his own plant nursery. During this time, at the age of 20, Nilu was inspired by Rabindranath Tagore's writings and went on to write a drama, Udyan. His composing for the drama Yerya Gabalache Kam Nahi during the 1957 Indian general election garnered him fame.

== Acting career ==
Nilu Phule began his theatrical career with the Marathi folk performances (Loknatya). His first professional drama was Katha Akalecha Kandyachi, which went on to have over 2000 shows. It was based on this success that he was offered his first movie Ek Gaav Baara Bhangadi, by Anant Mane in 1968.

Nilu often played villains; most notably his portrayal of Sakharam Binder. Some of his notable film roles include: Hindurao Dhonde Patil, a zamindar and a sugar tycoon in Samna, a power-drunk politician in Mahesh Bhatt's Saaransh and a political journalist in Jabbar Patel's Sinhasan.

He also played the role of 'Nathu Mama' in the 1983 hit Hindi movie Coolie where he worked with Amitabh Bachchan.

One of Phule's most notable theatrical performances include his role as the eponymous hero of Vijay Tendulkar's Sakharam Binder (first staged in 1972). Kamlakar Sarang, who directed the first production of the play in 1972, was apprehensive of Phule's reticence. However, he was convinced that Phule would be fit for the role, when Vijay Tendulkar reminded him of Phule's aggressive performance as a minister in another play, Katha Aklechya Kandyachi.

He was known for his voice and dialogue delivery. His dialogues in his films remains one of the most popular dialogues across Marathi Film Industry.

In May 2013, when Forbes India, the Indian edition of American Business Magazine Forbes, declared 25 Greatest Acting Performances of Indian Cinema, the list included Phule's performance as Hindurao Dhonde Patil in the film Samna.

== Death ==
Nilu Phule died on 13 July 2009, aged 79, from esophageal cancer. His wife Rajani Phule died in 2011. They are survived by their daughter Gargi Phule Tathe.

== Awards ==
- Sangeet Natak Akademi Award (1991), by the President of India
- Maharashtra State Film Award for Haat Lavin Tithe Sone (1973)
- Maharashtra State Film Award for Samna (1974)
- Maharashtra State Film Award for Choricha Mamla (1975)
- Filmfare Award for Best Actor – Marathi for Sahkar Samrat
- Jayantrao Tilak Memorial Life Time Achievement Award' given by Kesari Maratha Trust, Tilak Maharashtra Vidyapeeth and Akhil Bharatiya Marathi Natya Parishad, Pune chapter.
- Zee Chitra Gaurav Lifetime Achievement Award

== Plays Acted ==
1. Katha Akalecha Kandyachi
2. Sakharam Binder

== Filmography ==
Year	Title	Role	Film Language	Notes
1968	Ek Gaon Bara Bhangadi	Jhele Anna	Marathi	
1969	Mukkam Post Dhebewadi	Chandrakant	Marathi	
1969	Gan Gaulan	Bhau	Marathi	
1970	Dhartichi Lekare	Nilu	Marathi	
1970	Ganane Ghungroo Haravale	Chandarao	Marathi	
1971	Songadya	Battashya	Marathi	
1971	Asheech Ek Ratra	Nagya	Marathi	
1971	Lakhat Ashi Dekhani	Bapusaheb Batate	Marathi	
1972	Pinjara	Sarkar	Marathi	
1972	Harya Narya Zindabad	Narya	Marathi	
1973	Thapadya	Rao	Marathi	
1973	Haath Lavin Tithe Sone	Nilu	Marathi	Maharashtra State Film Award for Best Actor
1973	Sonarane Tochale Kaan	Baban Sonar	Marathi	
1975	Samna	Hindurao Dhonde Patil	Marathi	
1975	Varaat	Sopan	Marathi	
1975	Karava Tasa Bharava	Babu	Marathi	
1975	Dhoti Lota Aur Chowpatty	Street Vendor	Hindi	
1976	Farrari	Shripat's Father		
1976	Choricha Mamla	Chanderrao		
1976	Pudhari	Zumbar Sethji		
1977	Soyrik	Raut	Marathi	
1977	Banya Bapu	Kaka		
1977	Naav Motha Lakshan Khota	Usha's Father	Marathi	
1977	Jait Re Jait	Nagya's Father	Marathi	
1977	Bhingri	Daulatrao Patil		
1977	Mansa Paris Mendhra Bari	Hari Baramatikar	Marathi	
1978	Sarvasakshi	Balasaheb	Marathi	
1978	Padrachya Savlit	Nilubhau	Marathi	
1978	Sasurvasheen	Balasaheb	Marathi	
1979	Do Ladke Dono Kadke	Champa's husband	Hindi	
1979	Bhayaanak	Thakur Sahab	Hindi	
1979	Sunbai Oti Bharun Ja	Shekhar	Marathi	
1979	Sobati	Lambatya (Laxman)	Marathi	
1979	Chaandal Chowkadi	Deshmukh	Marathi	
1979	Sinhasan	Digu Tipnis	Marathi	
1979	Paijjecha Vida	Sakhya	Marathi	
1979	Meri Biwi Ki Shaadi	Fernandes	Hindi	
1979	Haldikunku	Himself	Marathi	Special appearance
1979	Deed Shahane	Babnya	Marathi	
1979	Aaitya Bilavar Nagoba	Bhujangrao	Marathi	
1980	Fataakadi	Damu Saavkaar	Marathi	
1980	Bhalu	Ramrao Runk	Marathi	
1980	Sau Din Saas Ke	Khubchand (Lalla Ji)	Hindi	
1980	Kadaklakshmi	Vaman	Marathi	
1980	Zidd	Jeeva Dada	Marathi	
1980	Sinhasan	Digu Tipnis	Marathi	
1980	Savat	Bandu Master	Marathi	
1981	Kasam Bhawani Ki	Maniram Lala	Hindi	
1981	Naram Garam	Guruji	Hindi	(Special appearance)
1981	Shama	Barrister	Hindi	
1981	Satichi Punyayee	Kishenseth Thorat		
1981	Patalin	Amrut Sheth	Marathi	
1981	Nagin	Ranjana's Father		
1981	Soon Majhi Laxmi	Gaffur Seth		
1981	Sahakar Samrat	Sampatrao Kodge		
1981	Saubhagyadaan	Dadasaheb		
1981	Mosambi Narangi	Mumbaji alias Suryajirao	Marathi	
1981	Aai	Guruji		
1981	Sundara Satarkar	Sundara's Father		
1981	Sulavarchi Poli	Kaka		
1982	Shapit	Rangya	Marathi	
1982	Laxmichi Paule	Sudama Pawar		
1982	Chatak Chandni	Sarpanch		
1982	Ramnagari	Himself	Marathi	Special appearance
1982	Raakhandar	Rajabahu		
1982	Galli Te Dilli	Saheb	Marathi	
1982	Don Baika Phajeeti Aika	Aburao		
1982	Diste Tasa Naste	Sarjerao Patil (Anna)		
1982	Bhujang	Bhujangrao	Marathi	
1982	Bhannat Bhanu	Kakasaheb		
1982	Aplech Daat Aplech Oth	Nana		
1982	Bhamta	Nilu	Marathi	
1982	Savitrichi Soon	Bhujangrao Kale		
1983	Gumnaam Hai Koi	Lajpat		
1983	Zara Si Zindagi	Jaggu (Kusum's father)	Hindi	
1983	Woh Saat Din	Maya's maternal grandfather	Hindi	
1983	Coolie	Nathu Mama	Hindi	
1983	Sasu Varchad Javai	Jyotish (Gangaram Teli) Golaram Teli		
1983	Raghumaina	Raghu's Father		
1983	Mardani	Prataprao Ramdokhey	Hindi	
1983	Kashyala Udyachi Baat	Nilkanth Sagle		
1983	Baiko Asavi Ashi	Balu (Balaram Mohite)	Marathi	
1983	Paaygoon	Sampatrao		
1984	Aao Jao Ghar Tumhara	Unnamed	Hindi	Small Role
1984	Mashaal	Vithal Rao	Hindi	
1984	Saaransh	Gajanan Chitre	Hindi	
1984	Zakhmi Sher	Lala (Anandi's father)	Hindi	
1984	Thakas Mahathak	Sarpanch Nanasaheb Uchle		
1984	Sage Soyare	Nanu Mama		
1984	Shraadha	Inamdar		
1984	Bin Kamacha Navra	Sahebrao		
1984	Bahuroopi	Dadasaheb Bhole		
1985	Gaon Tasa Changla Pan Veshila Tangla	Hindurao	Marathi	
1985	Devashappath Khara Sangen	Superintendent K. Bhanudas	Marathi	
1985	Haqeeqat	Rickshaw Driver	Hindi	
1985	Rao Saheb	Radhika's Father	Hindi	
1985	Dhagala Lagli Kala	Nilkanth	Marathi	
1986	Kaanch Ki Deewar	Lakhsmi Singh	Hindi	
1986	Sutradhar	Bhaurao		
1986	Maa Beti	Raghunandan	Hindi	
1986	Pudhcha Paool	Babasaheb		
1986	Insaaf Ki Awaaz	Balwant Azaad	Hindi	
1986	Gadbad Ghotala	Khalave		
1986	Bijli	Niluba - Sonar	Marathi	
1986	Mi Chairman Boltoy	Chairman	Marathi	
1987	Hirasat	Dhirubhai	Hindi	
1987	Sarja	Rustam	Marathi	
1987	Purnasatya	Patang Rao		
1987	Porichi Dhamaal Baapachi Kamaal	Digamber Avdhoot		
1987	Mohre	Social Worker	Hindi	
1987	Kalatay Pan Valat Nahi	Raosaheb Deshmukh		
1987	Jaago Hua Savera	Unnamed	Hindi	Unreleased
1987	Bhatak Bhavani	Kaluram Landge Saheb	Marathi	
1988	Aurat Teri Yehi Kahani	Thakur	Hindi	
1988	Maza Pati Karodpati	Laxmikant Kuber	Marathi	
1988	Tamacha	Jwala Pratap Singh	Hindi	
1988	Kabzaa	Mandar Bhagawat	Hindi	
1988	Bandiwan Mi Ya Sansari	Guru		
1988	Sarvashreshta	Bhau		
1988	Saglikade Bombabomb	Appasaheb Dharadhar	Marathi	
1988	Mamla Porincha	Nilu Bhau		
1988	Majjach Majja	Kaka Saheb	Marathi	
1989	Prem Pratigyaa	Mohan 'Dadhu' Rao	Hindi	
1989	Oonch Neech Beech	Sadhu	Hindi	
1989	Garibon Ka Daata	Post Master	Hindi	
1989	Hamaal De Dhamaal	Nilkanth Phule	Marathi	
1989	Ek Ratra Mantarleli	Ramsharan	Marathi	
1989	Auntyne Wajavli Ghanti	Dhanajirao	Marathi	
1990	Ghanchakkar	Nagraj Baba		
1990	Rickshawali	NK Dada		
1990	Kalat Nakalat	Nana Garud		
1990	Kuldeepak	Bahu Kasbe		
1990	Patli Re Patli	Mamasaheb		
1990	Disha	Dashrath 'Dadji' Mandre	Hindi	
1990	Dhamal Bablya Ganpyachi	Narsinghrao		
1991	Suryodaya			
1991	Halad Rusli Kunku Hasla	Dadasaheb		
1991	Pratikaar	Dadasaheb / Appaji	Hindi	
1992	Shubh Mangal Savdhan	Rajesh's Father		
1992	Zunz Tujhi Majhi	Bapujirao 'Nagoji' Nagvekar	Marathi	
1992	Than Than Gopal	Gopal Rao		
1992	Maalmasala	Manmohan		
1992	Ek Hota Vidushak	Nana	Marathi	
1992	Dharpakad	Dadasaheb Dharpakad	Marathi	
1993	Janmathep	Inspector Tirsinghrao Labade		
1993	Takkar	Mr. Saple		
1995	Painjan	Jairambapu Shingarwadikar		
1995	Senani Sane Guruji	Appa Rane		
1995	Limited Manuski	Jyotish Acharya	Marathi	
1996	Pratidaav	Rao	Marathi	
1996	Putravati	Police Commissioner Krishnakant Deshmukh		
1996	Durga Aali Ghara	Dadasaheb Deshmukh		
1996	Ashi Asavi Sasu	Mama		
1997	Paij Lagnachi	Aabasaheb		
1998	Ghar Bazar	Kishan Murari	Hindi	
2001	Zanzaavat	Gambler	Marathi	
2004	Prem Sakshi	Aajoba		
2004	Pandhar	Farmer		
2004	Saatchya Aat Gharat	Yuvraj's Grandfather	Marathi	
2005	Chalta Hai Yaar	Malhar Rao Patil	Hindi	
2007	Kadachit	Gayatri's Grandfather	Marathi	
2008	Gaav Tasa Chaangla	Satpute Master	Marathi	
2008	Mohini	Kaka	Marathi	
2008	Aara Aara Aaba Aata Tari Thamba	Sutradhar	Marathi	
2009	Goshta Choti Dongraevadhi	Himself	Marathi	Guest Appearance his last film before he died
2010	Ladi Godi	Rajesh's Dead Grandfather	Marathi	(final film role)
