= Usha Mangeshkar =

Indian singer (born 1935)

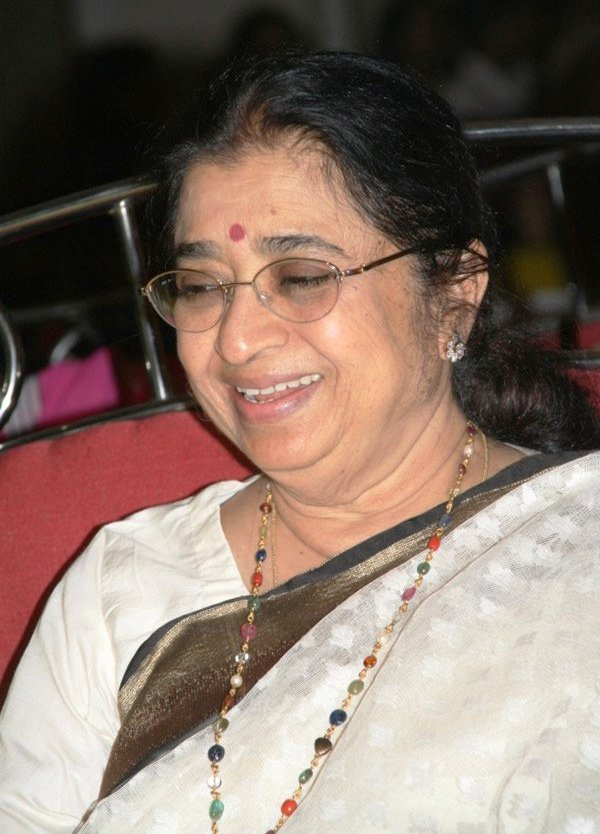
- Usha Mangeshkar in 2007

Background information
- Born: 15 December 1935 (age 90); Indore, Indore State, British India (present day Indore, Madhya Pradesh, India)
- Origin: Indian
- Genres: Indian classical music, playback singing
- Occupations: Singer
- Instruments: vocal
- Years active: 1954–present

Usha Mangeshkar (born 15 December 1935) is an Indian singer who has recorded many Marathi, Manipuri, Hindi, Bengali, Kannada, Nepali, Bhojpuri, Gujarati, Odia and Assamese songs. She is the youngest among four Mangeshkar sisters, after Lata Mangeshkar, Meena Khadikar and Asha Bhosle as well as only elder brother Hridaynath Mangeshkar. In 2025, she received Filmfare Marathi Lifetime Achievement Award for her contribution to Marathi cinema.

== Career ==
Mangeshkar came into the spotlight as a playback singer after singing some devotional songs for the movie Jai Santoshi Maa (1975), which became an all-time blockbuster. She was nominated for the Filmfare Best Female Playback Singer award for her song "Main to Aarti" in that film. She sang the same songs for that movie's remake in 2006.

Mangeshkar is known for her famous song "Mungda" and songs for the Marathi movie Pinjara. She is famous also for her song Chupi Chupi Gori Kane in Odia Film "Abhiman"(1977). She had also produced musical drama Phoolwanti for Doordarshan.

== Awards and nominations ==
- BFJA Awards for Best Female Playback Singer for Jai Santoshi Maa (1975)
- Nominated for Filmfare Award for Best Female Playback Singer for the song "Main to Aarti" from Jai Santoshi Maa (1975)
- Nominated for Filmfare Award for Best Female Playback Singer for the song "Mangta Hai To Aaja" from Inkaar (1977)
- Nominated for Filmfare Award for Best Female Playback Singer for the song "Humse Nazar To Milao" from Ikraar (1980)
- Winner of Mirchi Awards 2020 for Lifetime Achievement Awards
- Lata Mangeshkar Award by Government of Maharashtra (2020)
- Lokmat Sur Jyotsna National Music Award - 2025 Legend Award for her contribution to Indian music

== Discography ==
- "Bhabhi Aayi Badi Dhoom Dhaam Se" from Subah Ka Tara (1954)
- "Aplam Chaplam" from Azaad (1955), duet with Lata Mangeshkar
- "Chali Chali Kaisi Hawa Yeh Chali" from Bluff Master (1963)
- "Dekho Bijli Dole Bin Badal Ki" from Phir Wohi Dil Laya Hoon (1963), duet with Asha Bhosle
- "Kahe Tarasaye Jayara" from Chitralekha (1964), duet With Asha Bhosle
- "Namana Laaj Yestari" from Maitighar (1966)
- "Yariva nan mana", Kannada song from Kranthiveera Sangolli Rayanna (1967)
- "Tumhawar Keli Mi Marji Bahal" from Pinjara (1972)
- "Pyari Pyari Suratwale, Hay Mere Allah Itne Saare" from Khote Sikkay (1974), duet with Asha Bhosle
- "Main To Aarti Utaroon" from Jai Santoshi Maa (1975)
- "Asom Deshor Bagisare", Assamese song from Chameli Memsaab (1975)
- "Mungda" from Inkaar (1977)
- "Na Na Jaane Na Doongi" from Priyatama (1977)
- "Tu Jo Bole Han To Han" from Priyatama (1977)
- "Sultana Sultana" from Taraana (1979)
- "Muje Pyar Ka Tohfa Deke" from Kaala Patthar (1979)
- "Pakdo, Pakdo, Pakdo" from Naseeb (1981)
- "Rang Jamake Jayenge" from Naseeb (1981)
- "Goro Ki Na Kaalon Ki" from Disco Dancer (1982)
- "Sona-No Sooraj Ugyo" from Noorani Chehra
- "Aavo Aavo Momino Sahu Aavore" from Noorani Chehra

Also did scores of Marathi songs for Dada Kondke, including the most famous "Dhagala Lagali Kala" and "Tumhawar Keli Me Marji Bahar" from Pinjara. In 2008, Usha collaborated with Shaukat (Sam) Kassam for the CD Noorani Chehra, to commemorate the Golden Jubilee of the Agha Khan.

== Marathi songs ==
Year	Film	Song	Composer(s)	Co-artist(s)
1972	Pinjra	"Mala Lagli Kunachi" "Disla Ga Bai" "Mala Ishqachi Ingali Dasali" "Naka Todu Pawhn Jara Thamba" "Kashi Nashiban Thatta Aaj Mandli" "Tumhavar Keli Mi Marji" "Chabidar Chabi Mi"	Ram Kadam	Sudhir Phadke, Solo
1975	Jyotibacha Navas	"Phoola Sapnala Aali Ga" "Kunitari Sobatila Rahva Majhya" "Kalpnecha Kunchla" "Ghodyala Lagaam Ghala"	Sudhir Phadke	
1977	Bhingri	"Sajni Ga Bhulalo Mi" "Bhingari Title Track" "Naar Nakhryachi Mi Tarni" "Gorya Gorya Tachat" "Gobinda Re" "Lagnaat Gondhal Ghalte"	Bal Palsule	Solo, Mahendra Kapoor
1977	Ram Ram Gangaram	Mohra Ho Gangubai; Gangu Taroonya Tujh Befaam; Naki Doli Chaan; Galavarchi Khali Tujhya; Bakricha Samdyasni Laglay Lala	Ram Laxman	Mahendra Kapoor
1977	Bala Gau Kashi Angai	"Halke Halke Jojwa" "Tula Kadhitari Mi"	N. Dutta	Solo; Jaywant Kulkarni
1977	Navra Majha Bramhchari	"Daulaticha Naad Nako"	Pandurang Dixit	Solo
1978	Kalavantin	"Mee Ek Roop Vhave" "Kaapad Purena Cholila" "Raat Jhurtiya Chandrasathi"	Ram Kadam	Solo, Suresh Wadkar
1982	Bhannat Bhanu	"Majha Hoshil" "Adakitta Supari" "Tijori Choran Phodli"	Ram Kadam	Solo, Suresh Wadkar
1984	Bin Kamacha Navra	Ain Dupari Aad Watana	Rajendra Vinay	Solo
1987	Bhatak Bhavani	Tula Khula Mhanu Ki Shahana Mhanu; Amavsya Kay An Punav Kay	Vishwanath More	Suresh Wadkar
