= 56th Maharashtra State Film Awards =

Award ceremony for Indian films of 2018

- Awarded for: Best of Marathi cinema in 2018
- Awarded by: Government of Maharashtra
- Presented on: 26 May 2019
- Site: NSCI Dome, Worli, Mumbai
- Hosted by: Spruha Joshi; Sameer Choughule; Vishakha Subhedar
- Official website: www.filmcitymumbai.org

Highlights
- Best Feature Film: Bhonga
- Most awards: Bandishala (8)

The 56th Maharashtra State Film Awards, presented by the Government of Maharashtra celebrated excellence in Marathi cinema by honoring the best films released in 2018.

The nominations for the awards were announced by the Minister of Cultural Affairs, Vinod Tawde, along with winners in the technical and child artist categories. The award ceremony took place on 26 May 2019.

In total, 66 entries certified by the Central Board of Film Certification (CBFC) released between 1 January and 31 December 2018, were submitted for the preliminary round of evaluation. John Bailey, who was the president of the Academy of Motion Picture Arts and Sciences, attended the ceremony as the chief guest.

== Awards and nominations ==
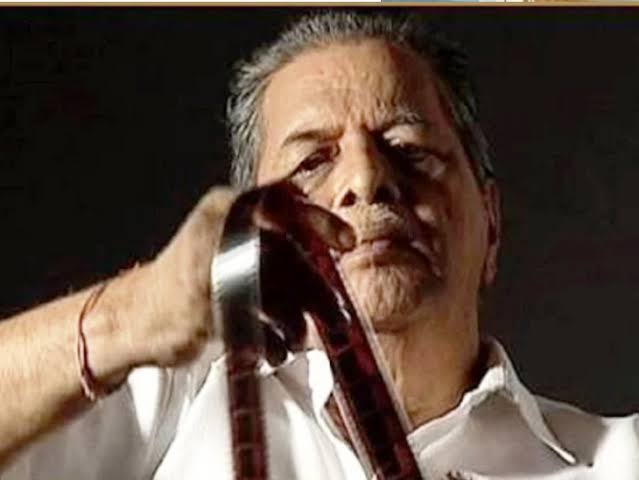
Waman Bhonsle, Raj Kapoor Award

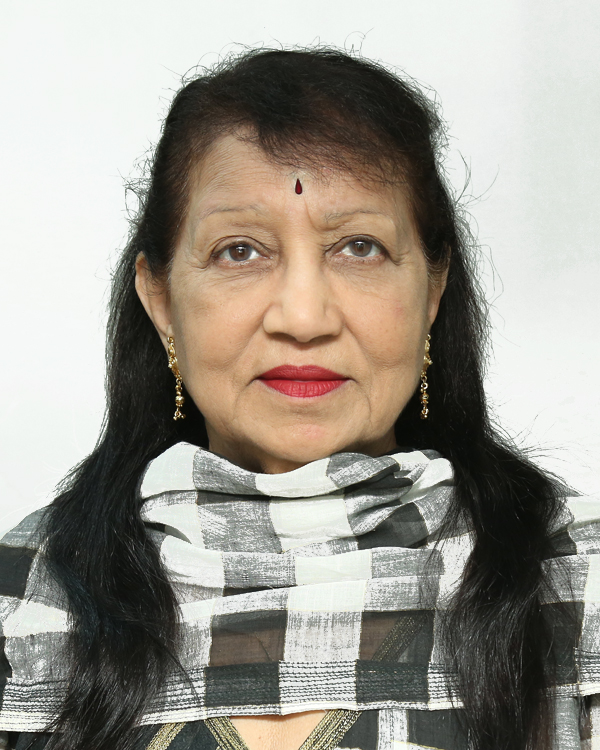
Sushama Shiromanee , V. Shantaram Lifetime Achievement Award

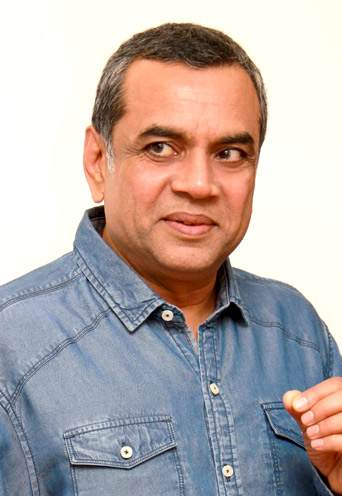
Paresh Rawal, Raj Kapoor Special Contribution Award

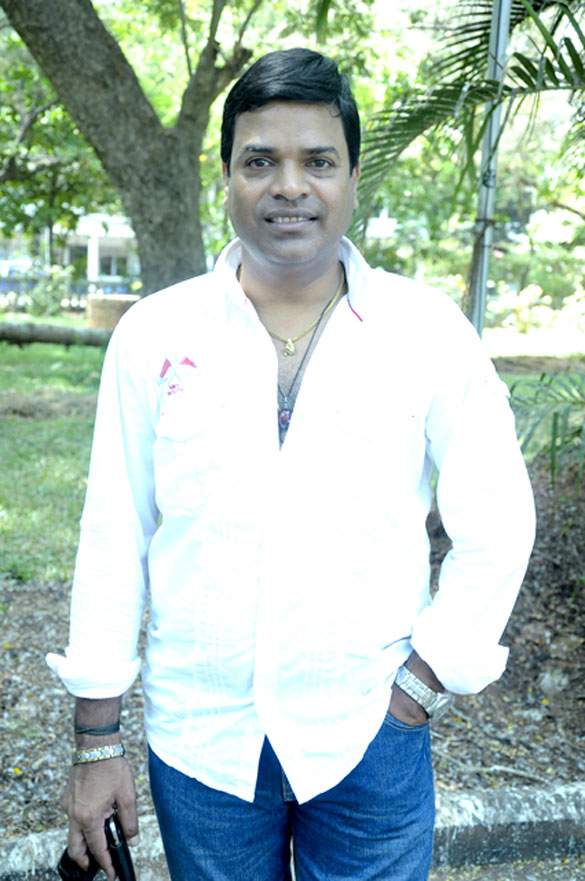
Bharat Jadhav, V. Shantaram Special Contribution Award

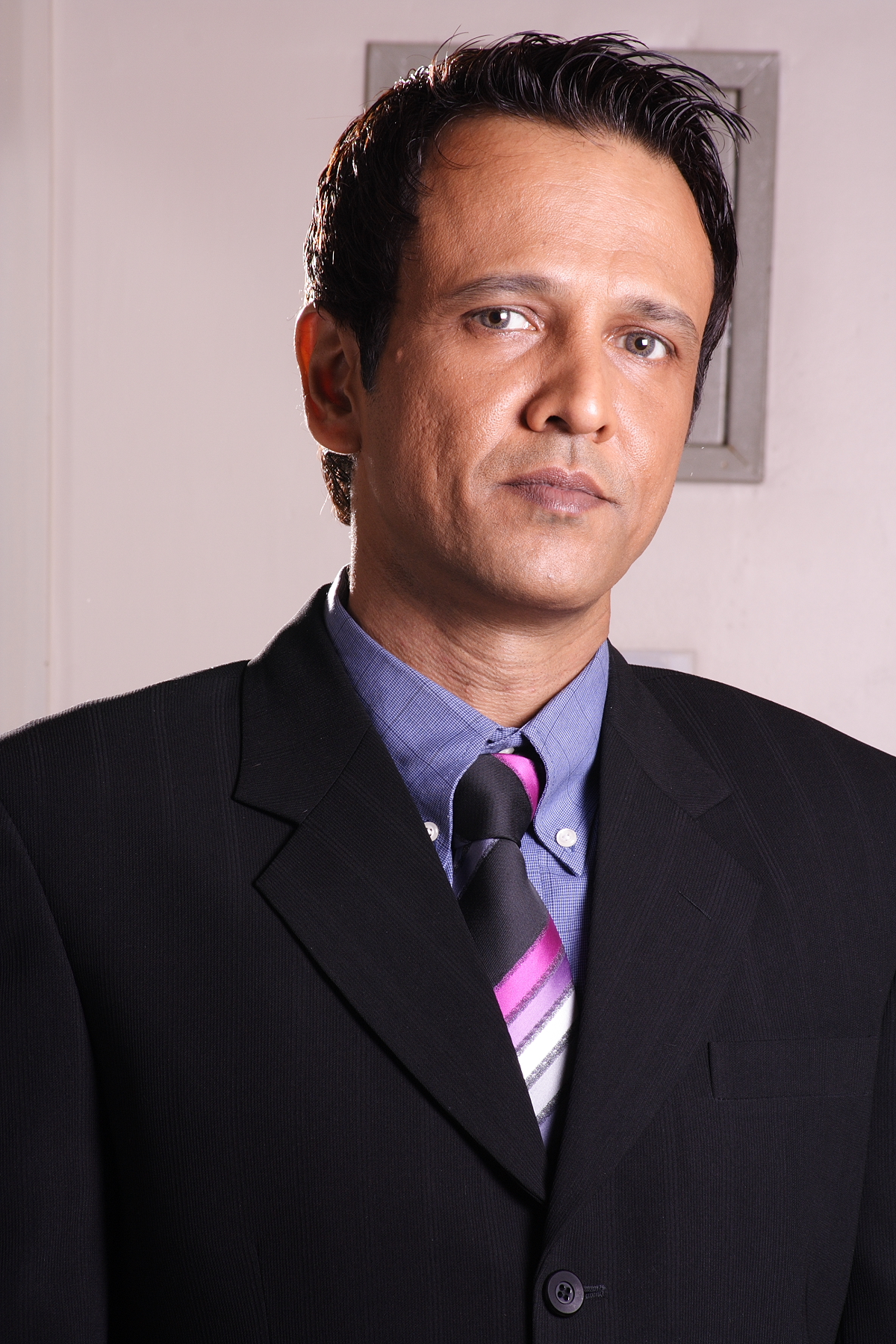
Kay Kay Menon, Best Actor

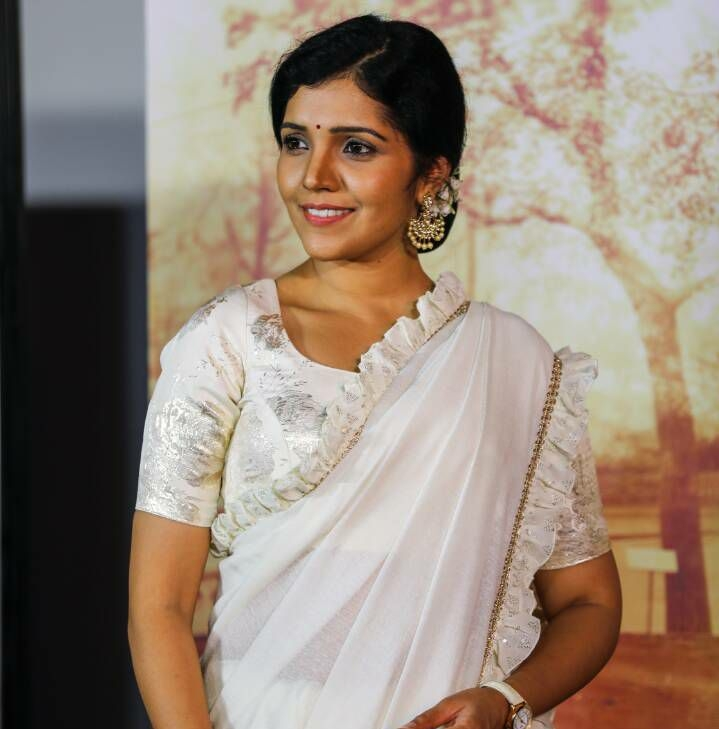
Mukta Barve, Best Actress

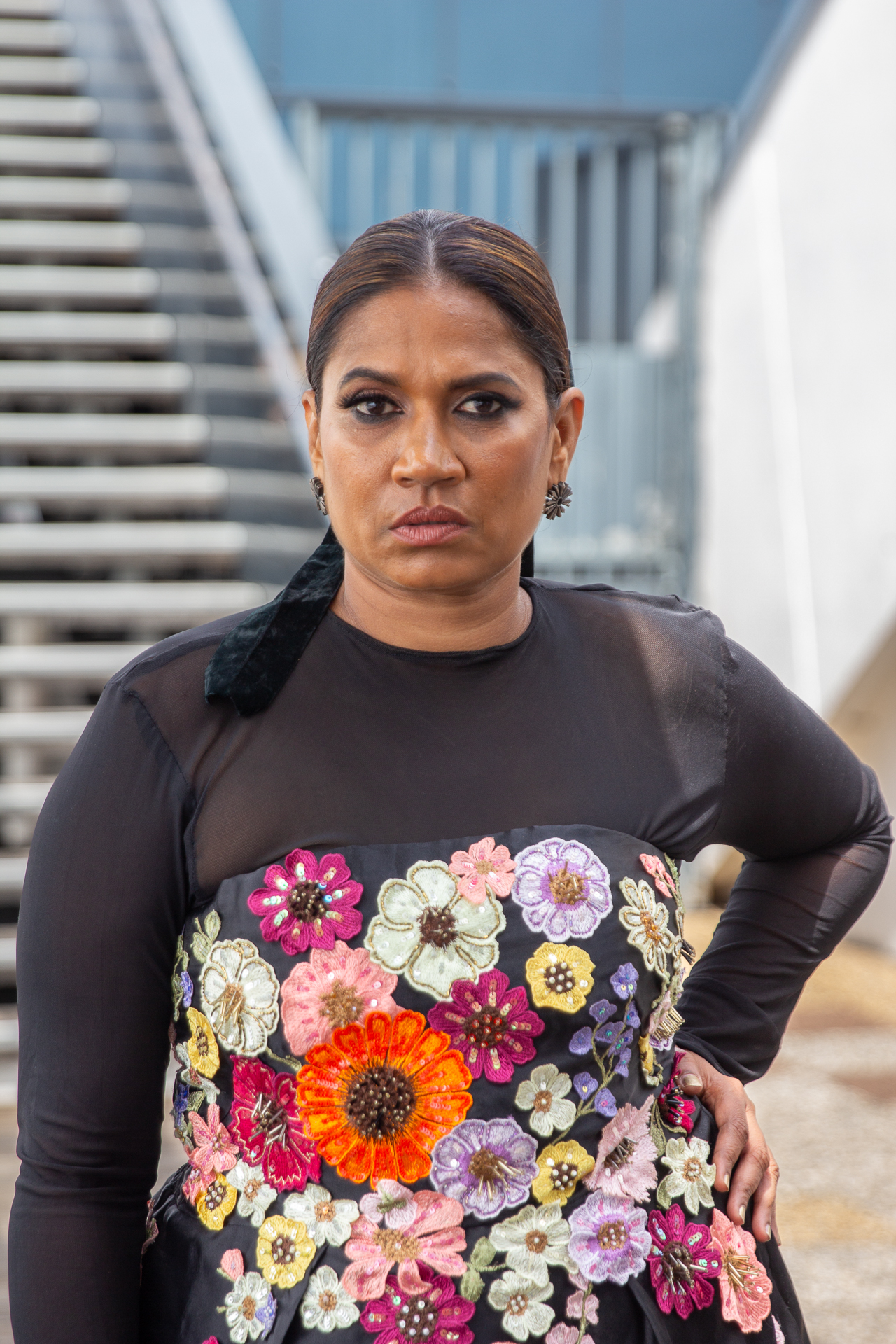
Chhaya Kadam, Best Supporting Actress

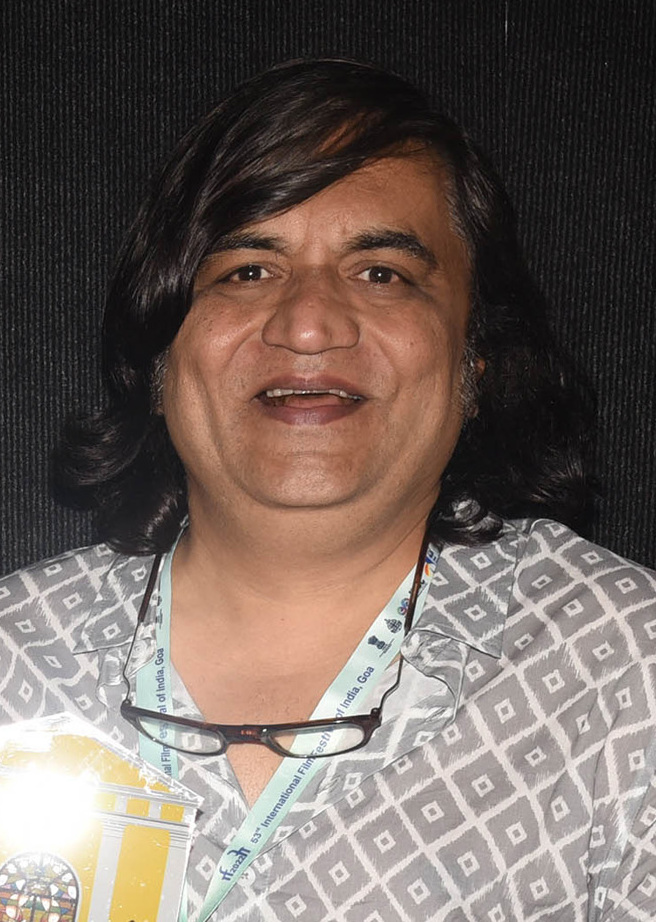
Swanand Kirkire, Best Supporting Actor

=== Film and director awards ===
Best Film I	Best Director I
Bhonga	Shivaji Lotan Patil – Bhonga
Best Film II	Best Director II
Bandishala	Milind Lele – Bandishala
Best Film III	Best Director III
Tendlya	Sachin Jadhav, Nachiket Waikar – Tendlya
Best Rural Film	Best Rural Film Director
Bhonga	Shivaji Lotan Patil – Bhonga
Best Social Film	Best Social Film Director
Ek Sangaychay; Ani... Dr. Kashinath Ghanekar; Bandishala; Chumbak; Tendlya; Bhonga; Firebrand; Aamhi Doghi; Bhurji; Dithee	Lokesh Gupte – Ek Sangaychay; Abhijeet Deshpande – Ani... Dr. Kashinath Ghanekar; Milind Lele – Bandishala; Sandeep Modi – Chumbak; Sachin Jadhav, Nachiket Waikar – Tendlya; Shivaji Lotan Patil – Bhonga; Aruna Raje – Firebrand; Pratima Joshi – Aamhi Doghi; Ashish Girme – Bhurji; Sumitra Bhave – Dithee

=== Acting awards ===
Best Actor (Shahu Modak and Sivaji Ganesan Award)	Best Actress (Smita Patil Award)
Kay Kay Menon – Ek Sangaychay as Malhar Raorane; Subodh Bhave – Ani... Dr. Kashinath Ghanekar as Kashinath Ghanekar; Kishor Kadam – Dithee as Ramji	Mukta Barve – Bandishala as Madhavi; Devika Daftardar – Naal as Aai; Kalyanee Mulay – Nude as Yamuna
Best Supporting Actor (Chintamanrao Kolhatkar Award)	Best Supporting Actress (Shanta Hublikar and Hansa Wadkar Award)
Swanand Kirkire – Chumbak as Prasanna; Sumeet Raghavan – Aapla Manus as Rahul Gokhale; Sachin Khedekar – Firebrand as Anand Pradhan	Chhaya Kadam – Nude as Chandrakka; Rajeshwari Sachdev – Firebrand as Divya; Nandita Patkar – Ani... Dr. Kashinath Ghanekar as Irawati Bhide
Best Child Artist (Gajanan Jagirdar Award)
Shrinivas Pokale – Naal as Chaitya; Aman Kamble – Tendlya as Tendlya

=== Debut awards ===
Best Debut Film Production	Best Debut Direction
Bandishala; Tendlya	Sachin Jadhav, Nachiket Waikar – Tendlya; Sudhakar Reddy Yakkanti – Naal
Best Debut Actor (Kashinath Ghanekar Award)	Best Debut Actress (Ranjana Deshmukh Award)
Firoz Sheikh – Tendlya; Ashish Girme – Bhurji	Gauri Kothawade – Pushpak Vimaan; Preeti Rankhambe – Bhurji

=== Music awards ===
Best Playback Singer Male	Best Playback Singer Female
Hrishikesh Ranade – Whatsup Lagna for "Tujhya Athvaninche"; Adarsh Shinde – Sopaskar for "Ya Jagi Nasen Me"; Swapnil Bandodkar – Madhuri for "Mala Sorry Mhanaychay"	Priyanka Barve – Bandishala for "Disha Petlya Daahi"; Vaishali Samant– Farzand for "Tumhi Yetana"; Nihira Joshi – Whatsup Lagna for "Funkarichi Vaadale"
Best Lyrics	Best Background Score
Sanjay Krushnaji Patil – Bandishala for "Kalokhachya Vatevar"; Sunil Sukhtankar – Welcome Home for "Radhe Radhe"; Cyli Khare – Nude for "Dis Yeti Dis Jati"	Vijay Narayan Gavande – Bandishala; Santosh Mulekar – Ani... Dr. Kashinath Ghanekar; Piyush Kanojiya – Savita Damodar Paranjpe
Best Music Director (Arun Paudwal Award)	Best Choreographer
Rajesh Sarkate – Menaka Urvashi; Narendra Bhide, Santosh Mulekar – Pushpak Vimaan; Shailendra Barve – Ek Sangaychay	Umesh Jadhav – Menaka Urvashi; Phulwa Khamkar – Whatsup Lagna; Deepali Vichare – Pushpak Vimaan

=== Writing awards ===
Best Story (Madhusudan Kalelkar Award)	Best Screenplay
Sudhakar Reddy Yakkanti – Naal; Shivaji Lotan Patil – Bhonga; Aruna Raje – Firebrand	Shivaji Lotan Patil, Nishant Dhapse – Bhonga; Sumitra Bhave – Dithee; Abhijeet Deshpande – Ani... Dr. Kashinath Ghanekar
Best Dialogue
Vivek Bele – Aapla Manus; Aruna Raje – Firebrand; Guru Thakur – Ani... Dr. Kashinath Ghanekar

=== Technical awards ===
Best Costume Design	Best Makeup
Chaitrali Gupte – Ek Sangaychay	Vikram Gaikwad – Ani.. Dr. Kashinath Ghanekar
Best Cinematography (Pandurang Naik Award)	Best Editing
Sudhir Palsane – Ani... Dr. Kashinath Ghanekar	Nachiket Waikar – Tendlya
Best Sound Mixing	Best Sound Editing
Mandar Kamlapurkar – Pushpak Vimaan	Gandhar Mokashi – Ani... Dr. Kashinath Ghanekar
Best Art Direction (Saheb Mama aka Fateh Lal Award)
Narendra Haldankar – Bandishala

=== Special awards ===
Raj Kapoor Award
- Waman Bhonsle
Raj Kapoor Special Contribution Award
- Paresh Rawal
V. Shantaram Lifetime Achievement Award
- Sushama Shiromanee
V. Shantaram Special Contribution Award
- Bharat Jadhav
