= Kolhatkar =

Kolhatkar is a surname. People with the surname include:

- Neel Kolhatkar
- Balakrishna Hari Kolhatkar
- Chittaranjan Kolhatkar
- Bhaskar Ram Kolhatkar
- Shripad Krushna Kolhatkar
- Chintaman Ganesh Kolhatkar

== See also ==
- Manoj Kolhatkar
