= Maharashtra State Film Award for Best Screenplay =

Indian film award

- Awarded for: Best screenplay in a Marathi film
- Reward: ₹100,000 (US$1,100)
- First award: 1962
- Final award: 2024

Highlights
- Total awarded: 62
- First winner: G. D. Madgulkar
- Last winner: Amarjeet Amle

The Maharashtra State Film Award for Best Screenplay that was instituted in 1962 is presented annually at the Maharashtra State Film Awards of India to an actor for best performance in a Marathi cinema film. The awardees are decided by a jury constituted every year. They are announced by the Minister for Cultural Affairs and are presented by the Chief Minister.

== Winners ==
Year	Recipient(s)	Film	Ref.
1962	G. D. Madgulkar	Prapanch	
1963	K. A. Abbas	Phakira	
1964	G. D. Madgulkar	Pathlaag	
1965	Shankar Babaji Patil	Vavtal	
1966	Bhalji Pendharkar	Sadhi Mansa	
1967	Ram Kelkar	Kaka Mala Vachva	
1968	Madhusudan Kalelkar	Aamhi Jato Amuchya Gava	
1969	Madhusudan Kalelkar	Aparadh	
1970	Ram Kelkar	Mumbaicha Jawai	
1971	S. N. Navre	Gharkul	
1972-73	Madhusudan Kalelkar	Jawai Vikat Ghene Aahe	
1974	Jagdish Khebudkar	Sugandhi Katta	
1975	Rajesh Mujumdar	Pandu Havaldar	
1976	Shankar Babaji Patil	Choricha Mamla	
1977	Anant Mane	Farari	
1977	Shankar Babaji Patil	Farari	
1978	G. D. Madgulkar	Devkinandan Gopala	
1978	Vitthal Wagh	Devkinandan Gopala	
1979	Anant Mane	Haldi Kunku	
1979	Shankar Babaji Patil	Haldi Kunku	
1980	Madhav Shinde	Sansar	
1980	Avinash Masurekar	Sansar	
1981	Vijay Tendulkar	Umbartha	
1982	G. R. Kamat	Shapit	
1983	Vasant Sabnis	Raghu Maina	
1984	S. N. Navre	Hech Maze Maher	
1985	Yashwant Ranjankar	Ardhangi	
1986	Shrinivas Bhanage	Tuzya Vachun Karmena	
1987	Vasant Sabnis	Gammat Jammat	
1988	Vasant Sabnis	Ashi Hi Banwa Banwi	
1989	Purushottam Berde	Hamaal De Dhamaal	
1990	Ramakant Kavthekar	Aaghat	
1991	Prakash Berlekar	Vedh	
1992	Purushottam Laxman Deshpande	Ek Hota Vidushak	
1993	Ujjwal Thengadi	Vazir	
1994	Jabbar Patel	Mukta	
1995	Sumitra Bhave	Doghi	
1996	Vijay Kuwlekar	Rao Saheb	
1997	Pratap Gangavane	Paij Lagnachi	
1998	S. N. Navre	Tu Tithe Mee	
1999	Ajit Dalvi	Bindhaast	
1999	Prashant Dalvi	Bindhaast	
2000	Dr. Chandrashekhar Phansalkar	Astitva	
2001	Abhiram Bhadkamkar	Devki	
2002	Sumitra Bhave	Vastupurush	
2003	Gajendra Ahire	Not Only Mrs. Raut	
2004	Bipin Nadkarni	Uttarayan	
2005	Mahesh Kothare	Khabardar	
2005	Abhiram Bhadkamkar	Khabardar	
2006	Mahesh Manjrekar	Matichya Chuli	
2007	Girish Joshi	Kadachit	
2008	Prasad Mirasdar	Made In China	
2008	Santosh Kolhe	Made In China	
2009	Mahesh Manjrekar	Mi Shivajiraje Bhosale Boltoy!	
2009	Abhijeet Deshpande	Mi Shivajiraje Bhosale Boltoy!	
2010	Ajinkya Deo	Jeta	
2010	Amol Shedge	Jeta	
2011	Sachin Darekar	Morya	
2012	Ravi Jadhav	Balak-Palak	
2012	Ambar Hadap	Balak-Palak	
2012	Ganesh Pandit	Balak-Palak	
2013	Chinmay Mandlekar	Duniyadari	
2014	Madhugandha Kulkarni	Elizabeth Ekadashi	
2014	Paresh Mokashi	Elizabeth Ekadashi	
2015	Kshitij Patwardhan	Double Seat	
2015	Sameer Vidwans	Double Seat	
2016	Sanjay Krushnaji Patil	Dashakriya	
2017	Sanjay Navgire	Redu	
2018	Shivaji Lotan Patil	Bhonga	
2018	Nishant Dhapse	Bhonga	
2019	Vikram Phadnis	Smile Please	
2020	Shantanu Rode	Goshta Eka Paithanichi	
2021	Rasika Aagashe	Ticha Shahar Hona	
2022	Sachin Kundalkar	Pondicherry	
2022	Tejas Modak	Pondicherry	
2023	Shashikant Khandare	Gypsy	
2024	Amarjeet Amle	Kurla To Vengurla	

== Multiple wins ==
Individuals with two or more Best Screenplay awards:

Wins	Recipients
4	Shankar Babaji Patil
3	G. D. Madgulkar; Vasant Sabnis; Madhusudan Kalelkar
2	Anant Mane; Mahesh Manjrekar; Sumitra Bhave; Vijay Tendulkar; Abhiram Bhadkamkar; S. N. Navre; Ram Kelkar
