= Mashaal =

- Poster
- Directed by: Yash Chopra
- Written by: Javed Akhtar
- Story by: Adaptation: Javed Akhtar; Original: Vasant Kanetkar
- Based on: Ashroonchi Zhali Phule by Vasant Kanetkar
- Produced by: Yash Chopra
- Starring: Dilip Kumar; Waheeda Rehman; Anil Kapoor; Rati Agnihotri; Gulshan Grover; Saeed Jaffrey; Alok Nath; Amrish Puri
- Cinematography: Santosh Sivan
- Music by: Hridaynath Mangeshkar
- Production company: Yash Raj Films
- Distributed by: Yash Raj Films
- Release date: 9 February 1984
- Running time: 170 minutes
- Country: India
- Language: Hindi

Mashaal (lit. 'Torch') is a 1984 Indian Hindi-language action film. Produced and directed by Yash Chopra, it starred Dilip Kumar, Waheeda Rehman, Anil Kapoor and Rati Agnihotri. The role played by Anil Kapoor was first offered to Amitabh Bachchan and then to Kamal Haasan, but after they declined the offer, the role went to Anil Kapoor. The project marked Anil's primary on-screen collaboration with Dilip Kumar. Vinod Kumar (Dilip Kumar) plays a respected, law-abiding citizen who turns to crime for exacting revenge. The film was based on the Marathi play Ashroonchi Zhali Phule written by Marathi writer Vasant Kanetkar. The film was remade in Malayalam as Ithile Iniyum Varu with Mammootty playing the lead role.

== Plot ==
Vinod Kumar is an upright and honest man, who runs a newspaper named "Mashaal". Vinod exposes the ills in society with the help of his newspaper. Vinod's wife, Sudha, sees a vagabond named Raja and tries to instill some values and culture in him. Vinod is sceptical about this, but accepts when Raja tells them of his tragic childhood and comes to regard Sudha as a maternal figure. Finally, Vinod decides to help Raja by sending him to Bangalore to complete his education and become a journalist. During frequent meetings with Vinod and Sudha, Raja befriends Geeta, an aspiring journalist and an assistant in Vinod's paper, and they fall in love.

During his investigations, Vinod finds that S.K. Vardhan, a wealthy and respected man in society, is behind many malpractices. Vinod starts exposing S.K's illicit business of drug-trafficking and selling hooch. Initially, S.K. tries to buy Vinod's silence by bribing him, but when Vinod decides to stand up to S.K., the latter inflicts misery on Vinod by having him thrown out of his rented house via the landlord. That very night, Vinod's newspaper office is burnt down by S.K.'s men. Helpless, and on the streets, tragedy strikes Vinod and Sudha further when Sudha, who is ailing, dies on the road, leaving Vinod distraught and heartbroken.

A disillusioned Vinod realizes that S.K. will always trump him, since people also support him. Instead of trying to expose S.K., Vinod now decides to follow S.K's footsteps in order to destroy him. Vinod, in association with Kishorilal, starts to produce illicit hooch and engages in other illegal businesses to earn money – the thing, Vinod retrospectively feels, he lacked, and the shortage of which led to the tragedies in his life. Soon, Vinod becomes rich. Meanwhile, Raja, who is in Bangalore for his studies, is unaware of these developments. The only other person exposed to this truth is Geeta, who has grown resentful of Vinod and has started to work in another newspaper.

Vinod's business now stands as a threat to Vardhan's empire. Soon, Raja returns after completing his education and meets Vinod and is surprised to see that the latter's lifestyle has changed, but doesn't know the truth.

Raja meets Munna, an old friend, from whom he learns that a new crime lord has entered the fray and has gained a foothold in the hooch and drugs world. Raja decides to expose this criminal, who, unbeknownst to him, is Vinod himself. Vinod is disturbed to learn that Raja is trying to dismantle his empire, but does not stop him. Raja starts working for Dinesh, another journalist for whom Geeta also works. A chance discussion between Raja, Dinesh and Geeta leads to the revelation that Vinod is, indeed, the new drug boss. Raja is flummoxed upon learning this, and goes to meet Vinod to confront him about this. Vinod accepts the truth, and tells him what happened. After an emotional upheaval and deep pondering, Raja decides that he will continue on the righteous path Vinod taught him, even if this means exposing the very person, who treated him as his own son, as a criminal. Vinod feels humbled when Raja tells him that he still views Vinod as his mentor, upon which Vinod gives him his blessings to continue his chosen work.

Meanwhile, Vinod and S.K's enmity reaches a head when Raja starts writing about both. Finally, S.K kidnaps Raja and threatens him. Vinod enters and saves Raja, before fighting with S.K. Vinod kills S.K by throwing him into the printing press wheels. Keshav, a henchman of S.K, tries to shoot Raja, but Vinod comes in between and gets fatally shot. Keshav is arrested, while Vinod dies in Raja's arms, happy and finally content.

== Cast ==
Actor	Name	Character/Role	Notes
Dilip Kumar	Vinod Kumar	Reporter/Newspaper Editor	Later becomes drug trafficker, black marketer, hooch seller
Waheeda Rehman	Sudha Kumar	Wife of Vinod Kumar	
Anil Kapoor	Raja	Black marketer, liquor seller	Later becomes Press Reporter/Newspaper Editor
Rati Agnihotri	Geeta	Press Reporter/Newspaper Editor and Raja's love interest	
Amrish Puri	S.K. Vardhan	Leader of drug traffickers, black marketers, hooch sellers	
Madan Puri	Tolaram	Assistant to S.K. Vardhan	
Saeed Jaffery	Kishorilal	Partners/Friends working under Vinod Kumar in drug trafficking, black marketing, hooch selling	
Nilu Phule	Vitthal Rao	Partners/Friends working under Vinod Kumar in drug trafficking, black marketing, hooch selling	
Mohan Agashe	Keshav	Partners/Friends working under Vinod Kumar in drug trafficking, black marketing, hooch selling	Later joins S.K. Vardhan after removed by Vinod Kumar
Avtar Gill	Mohan	Working under Vinod Kumar in drug trafficking, black marketing, hooch selling	
Annu Kapoor	Nagesh	Working under Vinod Kumar in drug trafficking, black marketing, hooch selling	Cameo Role
Harish Magon	Damodar	Working under Vinod Kumar in drug trafficking, black marketing, hooch selling	Becomes traitor and joins S.K.Vardhan/Keshav Gang
Gulshan Grover	Munna	Friends of Raja. Drug traffickers, black marketers, hooch sellers	
Madan Jain	Somu (Somesh)	Friends of Raja. Drug traffickers, black marketers, hooch sellers	Later becomes taxi driver
Alok Nath	Dinesh	Press Reporter/Newspaper Editor	
Iftekhar		Doctor	
Vikas Anand		Police Inspector	
Amrit Pal	Amrit	Goon/Casino Manager, under S.K.Vardhan	
Jaspal Sandhu		Grocery and Ration Shop Owner	

== Songs ==
No.	Title	Singer(s)	Length
1.	"Zindagi Aa Raha Hoon Main"	Kishore Kumar	05:50
2.	"Om Namah Shivaye Sanso Ki Sargam Pe Dhadkan Ye"	Lata Mangeshkar	03:50
3.	"Mujhe Tum Yaad Karanaa Aur Mujhako Yaad Aanaa Tum"	Kishore Kumar, Lata Mangeshkar	04:21
4.	"O Holi Aayee, Holi Aayee Dekho Holi Aayee Re"	Kishore Kumar, Lata Mangeshkar, Mahendra Kapoor	05:35
5.	"Footpathon Ke Ham Rahane Vaale, Raaton Ne Paalaa Ham Vo Ujaale"	Anup Jalota, Shailendra Singh, Hariharan, Suresh Wadkar	06:36
Total length:			26:12

== Box office ==
The film was declared 'Flop' by Box Office India for not even being able to recover its budget, generating only 25 million rupees at the box office despite a budget of 29 million. The film was Dilip Kumar's first flop in the year before Kumar's second flop Duniya. However, his performance is appreciated in both movies, specially Mashaal.

== Influence ==
The film is based on the well-known Marathi play Ashroonchi Zhali Phule written by famous Marathi writer playwright Vasant Kanetkar.

A film called Aansoo Ban Gaye Phool based on the same Marathi play, but presented differently was released in 1969, which was directed by Satyen Bose. It starred Ashok Kumar, Debu Mukherji and Pran in key roles.

== Awards ==
32nd Filmfare Awards:

Won

- Best Supporting Actor – Anil Kapoor

Nominated

- Best Actor – Dilip Kumar
- Best Story – Javed Akhtar
