= Maharashtra State Film Award for Best Dialogue =

Indian film award

- Awarded for: Best dialogue in a Marathi film
- Reward: ₹100,000 (US$1,100)
- First award: 1962
- Final award: 2024

Highlights
- Total awarded: 62
- First winner: G. D. Madgulkar

The Maharashtra State Film Award for Best Dialogue is an award, instituted in 1964, presented annually at the Maharashtra State Film Awards of India to an actor for best performance in a Marathi cinema film. The awardees are decided by a jury constituted every year. They are announced by the Minister for Cultural Affairs and are presented by the Chief Minister.

== Winners ==
Year	Recipient(s)	Film	Ref.
1962	G. D. Madgulkar	Prapanch	
1963	Madhukar Pathak	Garibargharchi Lek	
1964	Madhusudan Kalelkar	Pahu Re Kiti Vaat	
1965	Shankar Babaji Patil	Vavtal	
1966	Bhalji Pendharkar	Sadhi Mansa	
1967	Dinkar D. Patil	Patlachi Soon	
1968	Madhusudan Kalelkar	Aamhi Jato Amuchya Gava	
1969	Shankar Babaji Patil	Gan Gavlan	
1970	Ram Kelkar	Mumbaicha Jawai	
1971	S. N. Navre	Gharkul	
1972-73	Shankar Babaji Patil	Bholi Bhabdi	
1974	Jagdish Khebudkar	Sugandhi Katta	
1974	Vasant Painter	Sugandhi Katta	
1975	Vijay Tendulkar	Samna	
1976	Shankar Babaji Patil	Choricha Mamla	
1976	Shankar Babaji Patil	Pahuni	
1977	Madhusudan Kalelkar	Bala Gau Kashi Angai	
1978	Vasant Sabnis	Bhairu Pehlwan Ki Jai	
1979	Shankar Babaji Patil	Haldi Kunku	
1980	Vijay Tendulkar	Sinhasan	
1981	Vasant Sabnis	Gondhalat Gondhal	
1982	Dattaram Maruti Mirasdar	Ek Daav Bhutacha	
1983	Madhusudan Kalelkar	Gupchup Gupchup	
1984	Dattaram Maruti Mirasdar	Thakas Mahathak	
1985	Yashwant Ranjankar	Ardhangi	
1986	Shrinivas Bhanage	Tuzya Vachun Karmena	
1987	Dattaram Maruti Mirasdar	Prem Karuya Khullam Khulla	
1988	Vasant Sabnis	Ashi Hi Banwa Banwi	
1989	S. N. Navre	Kalat Nakalat	
1990	Ramakant Kavthekar	Aaghat	
1991	Vilas Rakte	Pratikar	
1992	Purushottam Laxman Deshpande	Ek Hota Vidushak	
1993	Ujjwal Thengadi	Vazir	
1994	Sanjay Pawar	Mukta	
1995	Sumitra Bhave	Doghi	
1996	Vijay Kuwlekar	Rao Saheb	
1997	Pratap Gangavane	Paij Lagnachi	
1998	S. N. Navre	Tu Tithe Mee	
1999	Ajit Dalvi	Bindhaast	
1999	Prashant Dalvi	Bindhaast	
2000	Dr. Chandrashekhar Phansalkar	Astitva	
2001	Abhiram Bhadkamkar	Devki	
2002	Prashant Dalvi	Bhet	
2003	Gajendra Ahire	Not Only Mrs. Raut	
2004	Kaustubh Sawarkar	Uttarayan	
2005	Sanjay Pawar	Dombivli Fast	
2006	Pratima Kulkarni	Savlee	
2007	Mangesh Hadawale	Tingya	
2008	Girish Salvi	Dhudgus	
2008	Rajesh Deshpande	Dhudgus	
2009	Mahesh Manjrekar	Mi Shivajiraje Bhosale Boltoy!	
2009	Sanjay Pawar	Mi Shivajiraje Bhosale Boltoy!	
2010	Shantanu Berde	Baboo Band Baaja	
2011	Sachin Darekar	Arjun	
2012	Sanjay Pawar	Bhartiya	
2013	Nitin Dixit	Avatarachi Goshta	
2014	Jayprad Desai	Nagrik	
2015	Kiran Yadnopavit	Natsamrat	
2016	Sanjay Krushnaji Patil	Dashakriya	
2017	Rohini Ninawe	Hrudayantar	
2018	Dr. Vivek Bele	Aapla Manus	
2019	Irawati Karnik	Anandi Gopal	
2020	Makarand Mane	Baaplyok	
2020	Vitthal Kale	Baaplyok	
2021	Nitin Nandan	Baalbhaarti	
2022	Pravin Tarde	Dharmaveer	
2023	Ambar Hadap	Jaggu Ani Juliet	
2023	Ganesh Pandit	Jaggu Ani Juliet	
2024	Ram Khatmode	Navardev Bsc. Agri.	
2024	Vinod Vanve	Navardev Bsc. Agri.	

== Multiple wins ==
Individuals with two or more Best Dialogue awards:

Wins	Recipients
5	Shankar Babaji Patil
4	Madhusudan Kalelkar; Sanjay Pawar
3	Vasant Sabnis; Dattaram Maruti Mirasdar
2	Vijay Tendulkar; S. N. Navre; Prashant Dalvi
