= Astitva =

- Theatrical release poster
- Directed by: Mahesh Manjrekar
- Written by: Imtiyaz Husain; Mahesh Manjrekar
- Screenplay by: Mahesh Manjrekar
- Story by: Mahesh Manjrekar
- Produced by: Rahul Sughand
- Starring: Tabu; Sachin Khedekar; Mohnish Bahl; Ravindra Mankani; Smita Jaykar; Sunil Barve; Namrata Shirodkar
- Cinematography: Vijay Kumar Arora
- Edited by: V. N. Mayekar
- Music by: Rahul Ranade; Sukhwinder Singh
- Release date: 6 February 2000 (India)
- Running time: 109 Minutes
- Country: India
- Languages: Marathi; Hindi
- Box office: ₹ 2.16 crores

Astitva (transl. Existence / Identity) is a 2000 Indian film made simultaneously in Marathi and Hindi languages, written and directed by Mahesh Manjrekar. The film tells the story of Aditi Pandit, a happily married woman whose husband Srikant Pandit becomes suspicious when she unexpectedly receives a fortune willed to her by her former music teacher, Malhar Kamat. Srikant tries to figure out why she had received the inheritance from Kamat, many years after the music classes had ended, and subsequently makes a discovery.

Astitva won the National Film Award for Best Feature Film in Marathi for the year 2000. Tabu's performance was highly acclaimed winning her several awards and is considered one of her best.

== Plot ==
Astitva encompasses issues such as male chauvinism, extramarital affairs, and spousal abuse. It is about a woman trying to find an identity outside her marriage.

It is 1997. Malhar Kamat (Mohnish Bahl), an old musician and music teacher, is dying. He prepares his will where he leaves his entire jaydad (estate) — comprising a haveli (mansion), 1.5 acres (6,100 m^{2}) of land, 1,400 grams of gold and approximately 860,000 rupees — to Aditi Shrikant Pandit (Tabu). Upon his death two years later, the will is delivered to Aditi.

When the will reaches Aditi in Pune, she is in the midst of an impromptu party occasioned by the arrival of Dr. Ravi Bapat (Ravindra Mankani) and his wife Meghna (Smita Jaykar). Ravi is a very close friend of Aditi's husband, Shrikant Pandit (Sachin Khedekar). Aditi and Shrikant's only child, Aniket (Sunil Barve) introduces his fiancée, Revati (Namrata Shirodkar) to everyone at the party.

Shrikant opens the certified package that contains the will, even though it is addressed to Aditi, much to Meghna's chagrin and Ravi's surprise. Shrikant is intrigued and refers to his diaries from 25 years ago, in which he has chronicled events from his daily life. He realises that Aditi could not have possibly been pregnant from him at that time, because he was travelling on work. He shows her the diary, confronts her with the facts, and demands an explanation.

In a flashback, Shrikant is an up-and-coming star at a firm, seeking to break out on his own. His work keeps him traveling almost constantly. This leaves his newlywed wife Aditi lonely and frustrated.

When she asks him to let her work someplace (clearly to relieve her boredom and find a good use for her time), he takes it as an insult and rebuffs her saying no woman in his family has ever worked outside the home and that he earns enough for them to live comfortably. He suggests (although not very enthusiastically) that she take up music. The music teacher is Malhar Kamat. Shrikant continues his unending travels all over the world, although he makes it clear to Malhar that music will not be anything more than a hobby for Aditi.

Aditi's sister Sudha (Resham Tipnis) and her husband come to live with Aditi. Their constant lovemaking further deepens Aditi's feelings of yearning and abandonment. And one spring afternoon, as Malhar breaks into his new ghazal in the rain, Aditi's resolve is broken under the influence of the season. Malhar returns a couple of days later, and Aditi asks him to leave stating she loves only Shrikant. Aditi has missed a period. Sudha learns this and advises her to do something.

When Shrikant returns, Aditi breaks down and tries to tell him the truth about her pregnancy. But Shrikant is doubly elated, having won the first major contract for his own firm and, hearing of his imminent fatherhood, and breaks out into celebrations without letting Aditi complete her story.

As the story comes back to present time, Shrikant punishes Aditi by making her tell the truth in front of Aniket, Ravi and Meghna. Meghna loathes Shrikant, since she suffered spousal abuse from her drunkard husband before divorcing him and marrying Ravi. Aniket is disgusted with his mother after learning the truth of his paternity.

Ravi confronts Shrikant, reminding him of his many extramarital affairs. Shrikant refuses to accept it stating he is a man and he did not bring any children, born of those affairs, home.

Shrikant decides that he will live with Aditi, but any spousal relationship between them will not exist. After Revati learns the truth, she breaks off her engagement, not because of the truth, but because she realizes that Aniket is no different from the man he knew as his father.

Meghna decides to take Aditi to Goa with her, but Aditi declines. Before leaving the house, she demands her husband and son's presence to hear her. She states how her weakness is called sin, whereas Shrikant's weaknesses are accepted easily. She questions who has the authority to accept his weakness. Aditi also reveals to Shrikant that she has harboured another secret from him that he is impotent and that is why she was not able to bear any children with him; how could she have been labelled infertile if she didn't have a child. Revati reprimands Aniket stating he is alive as his mother didn't decide otherwise. The movie ends with Revati and Aditi walking out of the house and on the road, while Shrikant and Aniket stand in the doorway, watching them go.

The denouement captures the essence of astitva.

== Cast ==
- Tabu as Aditi Pandit
- Sachin Khedekar as Shrikant Pandit
- Ravindra Mankani as Ravi
- Smita Jaykar as Meghna
- Mohnish Bahl as Malhar Kamat
- Sunil Barve as Aniket Pandit
- Namrata Shirodkar as Revathi
- Gulfam Khan as Asma Parveen
- Resham Tipnis as Sudha

== Production ==
The role of lead actress was first offered to Madhuri Dixit, a leading lady of her times. When she rejected the offer, it went to Tabu, who received an important film of her acting career.

The story is based on Guy de Maupassant's novel "Pierre and Jean", which was also made into a 1943 French film Pierre and Jean, the Mexican movie Una mujer sin amor, released in 1952 and into the 2015 American drama film Peter and John.

== Music ==
1. "Chal Chal Mere Sang Sang" - Sukhwinder Singh
2. "Gaana Mere Bas Ki Baat Nahin" - Sadhana Sargam, Shankar Mahadevan
3. "Gaana Mere Bas Ki Baat Nahin v2" - Sadhana Sargam, Shankar Mahadevan
4. "Kitne Kisse Hain Tere Mere" - Hema Sardesai
5. "Main Thi Main Hoon" - Kavita Krishnamurthy
6. "Sabse Pehle Sangeet Bana" - Kavita Krishnamurthy, Sukhwinder Singh
7. "Spirit Of Astitva" - N/A
8. "Zindagi Kya Baat Hai" - Sukhwinder Singh

== Accolades ==
Award (Note: Awards, festivals and organizations are in alphabetical order.)	Date of ceremony (Note: Date is linked to the article about the awards held that year, wherever possible.)	Category	Recipient(s)	Result	Ref.
Bollywood Movie Awards	28 April 2001	Best Story	Mahesh Manjrekar	Nominated	
Bollywood Movie Awards	28 April 2001	Best Actress	Tabu	Nominated	
Bollywood Movie Awards	28 April 2001	Best Critics Role - Female	Tabu	Won	
Bollywood Movie Awards	28 April 2001	Most Sensational Actress	Tabu	Won	
Filmfare Awards	17 February 2001	Best Actress	Tabu	Nominated	
Filmfare Awards	17 February 2001	Critics Award for Best Actress	Tabu	Won	
International Indian Film Academy Awards	16 June 2001	Best Actress	Tabu	Nominated	
Maharashtra State Film Awards	2000	Best Film II	Astitva	Won	
Maharashtra State Film Awards	2000	Best Director II	Mahesh Manjrekar	Won	
Maharashtra State Film Awards	2000	Best Actress	Tabu	Won	
Maharashtra State Film Awards	2000	Best Story	Chandrashekhar Phansalkar	Won	
Maharashtra State Film Awards	2000	Best Screenplay	Chandrashekhar Phansalkar	Won	
Maharashtra State Film Awards	2000	Best Dialogue	Chandrashekhar Phansalkar	Won	
Maharashtra State Film Awards	2000	Best Costume Design	Deepa Manjrekar, Shefali Gupta	Won	
Maharashtra State Film Awards	2000	Best Publicity Design	Glamour Publicity	Won	
National Film Awards	12 December 2001	Best Feature Film in Marathi	Producer: Jhamu Sughand; Director: Mahesh Manjrekar	Won	
Screen Awards	20 January 2001	Best Film	Astitva	Nominated	
Screen Awards	20 January 2001	Best Story	Mahesh Manjrekar	Won	
Screen Awards	20 January 2001	Best Screenplay	Mahesh Manjrekar	Nominated	
Screen Awards	20 January 2001	Special Jury Award (Note: also for Nidaan)	Mahesh Manjrekar	Won	
Screen Awards	20 January 2001	Best Dialogue	Imtiyaz Husain	Nominated	
Screen Awards	20 January 2001	Best Actress	Tabu	Won	
Zee Cine Awards	3 March 2001	Best Actor – Female	Tabu	Won	
