= Uravu Solla Oruvan =

- Title card
- Directed by: Devaraj–Mohan
- Screenplay by: Panchu Arunachalam
- Story by: Sharad Pilgaonkar
- Produced by: Filmalaya Ramachandran
- Starring: Muthuraman; Cho; Sujatha; Padmapriya
- Cinematography: R. N. K. Prasad
- Edited by: B. Kandhasami
- Music by: Vijaya Bhaskar
- Production company: Filmalaya Combines
- Release date: 18 July 1975
- Country: India
- Language: Tamil

Uravu Solla Oruvan (transl. Someone to Relate to) is a 1975 Indian Tamil-language romantic drama film directed by Devaraj–Mohan and written by Panchu Arunachalam. It is a remake of a Marathi film written by Sharad Pilgaonkar. The film stars Muthuraman, Cho, Sujatha and Padmapriya. It was released on 18 July 1975, and became a success. Sujatha won the Filmfare Award for Best Actress – Tamil.

== Cast ==
- Muthuraman as Mohan
- Sivakumar as Bhaskar (guest appearance)
- S. Varalakshmi (guest appearance)
- Cho
- Sujatha as Sumathi
- Padmapriya as Indra
- Senthamarai
- Vijayan
- Jayamkondan

== Production ==
Uravu Solla Oruvan is the first film produced by Filmalaya Combines, established by Panchu Arunachalam and his friend Filmalaya Ramachandran. It is a remake of a Marathi film, written by Sharad Pilgaonkar. Production duties were handled by Ramachandran, cinematography by R. N. K. Prasad and editing by B. Kandhasami.

== Soundtrack ==
The music was composed by Vijaya Bhaskar, with lyrics by Panchu Arunachalam.

Track listing
No.	Title	Singer(s)	Length
1.	"Panimalar"	P. Susheela
2.	"Mohana Punnagai"	K. J. Yesudas

== Release and reception ==
Uravu Solla Oruvan was released on 18 July 1975. Kanthan of Kalki appreciated the film for the cast performances, Cho's comedy, the cinematography and direction. Kumudam lauded the story, Sujatha's performance, the direction and cinematography. The film was a success, and its 50th day celebration was held at Shanmuga Theatre, Coimbatore. Sujatha won the Filmfare Award for Best Actress – Tamil.
