= Aparadh =

1969 Indian film

- Directed by: Rajdutt
- Screenplay by: Madhusudan Kalelkar
- Story by: Chandrakant Kakodkar; Sharad Pilgaonkar
- Produced by: Sharad Pilgaonkar
- Starring: Ramesh Deo; Seema Deo; Indrani Mukherjee; Vivek; Bal Kolhatkar; Lata Thatte
- Cinematography: Datta Gorle
- Edited by: Pandurang Khochikar
- Music by: Datta Naik
- Production company: Manorama Films
- Release date: 1969
- Running time: 125 minutes
- Country: India
- Language: Marathi

Aparadh (transl. Crime) is a 1969 Indian Marathi- language family & crime drama directed by Rajdutt and produced by Sharad Pilgaonkar under the banner of Manorama Films. The film stars Ramesh Deo, Seema Deo, Indrani Mukherjee, Vivek in lead roles. The film won nine awards at the 8th Maharashtra State Film Awards including Best Film.

== Plot ==
Shyam Date, a well-known singer, is hospitalised after being injured in an accident. During his treatment at the General Civil Hospital, he develops a close relationship with Vasudha, one of the nurses caring for him. The two eventually fall in love. Vasudha subsequently leaves her position at the hospital and remains out of contact with Shyam for several days. When she returns, Vasudha tells Shyam that she has taken up employment as a companion to Asawari, a young woman suffering from a heart condition. Shyam visits Vasudha while she is working for Asawari. During his visits, Asawari develops romantic feelings for him.

Vasudha then persuades Shyam to reciprocate Asawari's feelings and marry her, revealing that Asawari is believed to have only a short time to live. She assures Shyam that after Asawari's death, he would inherit her wealth, allowing the couple to build a life together. Shyam agrees to the plan and marries Asawari. Following the marriage, however, Asawari's health unexpectedly begins to improve. Fearing that their plan will fail, Vasudha urges Shyam to kill Asawari.

== Cast ==
- Ramesh Deo as Shyam Date
- Seema Deo as Vasudha
- Indrani Mukherjee as Asawari
- Raja Paranjape as Dr. Paranjape
- Vivek as Kailash Deshmukh
- Lata Thatte
- Bal Kolhatkar
- Mangala Parvate as Atyabai
- Mandakini Bhadbhade

== Soundtrack ==
Aparadh

Soundtrack album by Datta Naik
- Released: 1969
- Genre: Feature film soundtrack
- Length: 14:02
- Language: Marathi
- Label: Saregama

The movie soundtrack has 4 songs composed by Datta Naik.

=== Track listing ===
| No. | Title | Singer(s) | Length |
|---|---|---|---|
| 1 | "Sang Kadhi Kalnar Tula" | Mahendra Kapoor, Suman Kalyanpur | 3:48 |
| 2 | "Sur Tech Chhedita" | Mahendra Kapoor | 3:46 |
| 3 | "Swapnat Pahile Je" | Mahendra Kapoor | 3:14 |
| 4 | "Tujhi Preet Aaj Kashi Smaru" | Asha Bhosle | 3:24 |

== Accolades ==
Awards from popular organisations
| Year | Award | Category | Winner |
|---|---|---|---|
| 1968 | Filmfare Awards Marathi | Best Film | Sharad Pilgaonkar |
| 1968 | Maharashtra State Film Awards | Best Film | Sharad Pilgaonkar |
| 1968 | Maharashtra State Film Awards | Best Director | Rajdutt |
| 1968 | Maharashtra State Film Awards | Best Supporting Actor | Ramesh Deo |
| 1968 | Maharashtra State Film Awards | Best Supporting Actress | Indrani Mukherjee |
| 1968 | Maharashtra State Film Awards | Best Music Director | Datta Naik |
| 1968 | Maharashtra State Film Awards | Best Playback Singer – Male | Mahendra Kapoor |
| 1968 | Maharashtra State Film Awards | Best Playback Singer – Female | Asha Bhosle |
| 1968 | Maharashtra State Film Awards | Best Art Direction | Datta Gorle |
| 1968 | Maharashtra State Film Awards | Best Cinematography | T. K. Desai |
