= Imtiyaz Husain =

Indian film writer

- Born: Azamgarh UTTAR PRADESH, India
- Occupations: Screenwriter, writer, film actor

Imtiyaz Husain is an Indian film writer. He wrote the 2000 film Astitva with Mahesh Manjrekar.

== Filmography ==
=== Actor ===
- Ghulam-E-Mustafa (1997) as Minister Imtiyaz
- Parinda (1989) as Dara

=== Writer ===
- Annarth (2002) (screenplay and story)
- Astitva (2000) (Hindi dialogues)
- Vaastav: The Reality (1999) (dialogues)
- Ghulam-E-Mustafa (1997) (dialogue and screenplay)
- Is Raat Ki Subah Nahin (1996) (dialogues)
- Stunttman (1994) (dialogues)
