= Maharashtra State Film Award for Best Publicity Design =

Indian film award

- Awarded for: Best advertising in a Marathi film
- Reward: ₹50,000 (US$530)
- First award: 1984
- Final award: 2014

Highlights
- Total awarded: 30

The Maharashtra State Film Award for Best Publicity Design, instituted in 1984, is presented annually at the Maharashtra State Film Awards of India to an actor for best performance in a Marathi cinema. The awardees are decided by a jury constituted every year. They are announced by the Minister for Cultural Affairs and are presented by the Chief Minister.

== Winners ==
Year	Recipient(s)	Film	Ref.
1984	Shrikant Dhondge	Navri Mile Navryala	
1985	Shrikant Dhondge	Ardhangi	
1986	Subodh Guruji	Pudhcha Paool	
1987	Milind Tambat	Kaltay Pan Valat Nahi	
1988	Shrikant Dhondge	Ashi Hi Banwa Banwi	
1989	Sanjay Pawar	Suryoday	
1990	Kamal Shedge	Ek Ratra Mantarleli	
1991	Suresh Deshmane	Kal Ratri Bara Vajta	
1992	Prakash Bhende	Apan Yana Pahilat Ka	
1992	Prakash Taade	Apan Yana Pahilat Ka	
1993	Not Awarded		
1994	Suresh Deshmane	Yadnya	
1995	Suresh Navadkar	Painjan	
1995	Ramesh Navadkar	Painjan	
1996	Suresh Deshmane	Ashi Asavi Sasu	
1997	Dhananjay Pandit	Paij Lagnachi	
1998	Suresh Navadkar	Tu Tithe Mee	
1998	Ramesh Navadkar	Tu Tithe Mee	
1999	Suresh Navadkar	Bindhaast	
1999	Ramesh Navadkar	Bindhaast	
1999	Sanjay Gaydhani	Bindhaast	
2000	Glamour Publicity	Astitva	
2001	Girish-Rajesh Saidurga	Ek Hoti Vadi	
2002	Achyut Palav	Vastupurush	
2003	Atmanand Shinde	Anahat	
2003	Vivek Shinde	Anahat	
2004	Not Awarded		
2005	Achyut Palav	Pak Pak Pakaak	
2006	Video Palace	Hi Porgi Kunachi	
2007	Kunal Naik	Checkmate	
2008	Balkrushnan	Ti	
2009	Sachin Suresh Gurav	Pangira	
2010	Kumar Gokhale	Lalbaug Parel	
2011	Not Awarded		
2012	Ravi Jadhav	Balak-Palak	
2013	Shree Venkateshwara	1909	
2014	Himanshu Nanda	Dusari Goshta	
2014	Rahul Nanda	Dusari Goshta	

== Multiple wins ==
Individuals with two or more Best publicity designer Awards:

Wins	Recipients
3	Shrikant Dhondge; Suresh Deshmane; Suresh Navadkar; Ramesh Navadkar
2	Achyut Palav
