= Lekure Udanda Jahali =

Marathi play

Lekure Udanda Jahali (Marathi: लेकुरे उदंड जाहली), (English: Bumper Crop of Kids), is a 1966 Marathi play by Vasant Shankar Kanetkar. The name refers to a stanza from Dasbodh by Samarth Ramdas.

== Versions ==
Lekure Udand Jhaali is a Vasant Kanetkar play which has been revived twice. The first revival was in the 70's by The Goa Hindu Association. The first show of the revived version was conducted on 25 May 1973 at Sahitya Sangh Mandir at Girgaon. It completed over 1000 shows. The play was redesigned by Premanand Polle for Kala Academy - Goa's Repertory company (Rang Mell) in 2004. Dr. Saish Deshpande composed all the songs in modern fusion genre and were performed live on recorded tracks.

== Cast ==
The first version of the play had Shrikant Moghe playing 'Rajaram' while Kalpana Mujumdar (born Kalpana Deshpande) playing the role of 'Madhurani'. The miscellaneous cast of the play was Bholaram Athavale (Dhatingan Guruji), Baba Mahadik (Doctor Astaputre), Prakash Inamdar (Gora), Pravin Patil (Marutrao), Vitthal Pandurkar / Mohandas Sukhtankar (Dasopant), Mandakini Bhadbhade / Kumud Damle (Sonutai), Shripad Joshi (Vyankatrao)

The second version or first revival had the lead roles played by Shrikant Moghe & Daya Dongre. Another version or revival was undertaken in the 1990s by Prashant Damle.

The third version or second revival of the play in 2014 is produced by Bhagyashree Desai and directed by Vijay Kenkre. It has unusual music with Western tunes by the late Jitendra Abhisheki and Ashok Patki. Sumeet Raghavan returning to the theatre after a gap of 15 years plays Rajaram while his real life wife Chinmayee Raghavan portrays Madhurani. Uday Sabnis and Ajit Kelkar play supporting roles. The other members of the cast are Mrunal Chemburkar, Sunil Godbole, Shivani Karhadkar, Sudesh Mhashilkar.

== Plot ==
The story revolves around a rich, childless couple, Raja and Rani Tambe. The couples greedy relatives presume that as the Tambes do not have any children, their kids will inherit all their property. Slowly and steadily the relatives create situations to suit their purposes and manipulates Rani's intense desire to have kids so that she ends up agreeing to adopt one of her sisters many kids. On the other hand, Raja's brother is playing a similar trick on him. This leads to a fight between the couple on whose kid should they adopt? His brothers or her sisters? However, when Raja loses his wealth in some bad investments the sweet relatives are quick to show their true colors. With poverty the Tambes are rid of their false relations. However even in these adverse times the servant in their house refuses to leave them for he considers himself a part of the family. The play ends on a happy note when Rani discovers that she is pregnant. They are poor & lonely now; but this one joy infuses hope & enthusiasm in their lives. Raja resolves to start his life afresh so that he can give his baby the best things money can buy.

== Rewards ==
The noted thespian Prashant Damle has received the following awards for his version of the play.

- Best Singer/Actor - 1995 - Kalnirnay, Lekure Udand Jhali
- Best Singer/Actor - 1995 - Akhil Bhartiya Natya Parishad, Lekure Udand Jhali
- Best Actor, Maharashtra State Award, Lekure Udand Jhali
- Best Actor, Critics Award, Lekure Udand Jhali
