= Baarish (film) =

- Poster
- Directed by: Shankar Mukherjee
- Written by: Vrajendra Kaur
- Screenplay by: Madhusudan Kalelkar
- Story by: Gyan Mukherjee
- Produced by: K. H. Kapadia
- Starring: Dev Anand; Nutan
- Cinematography: K. H. Kapadia
- Edited by: Vithal Banker
- Music by: C. Ramchandra
- Production company: Alankar Chitra
- Distributed by: Alankar Chitra
- Release date: 1957
- Country: India
- Language: Hindi

Baarish (lit. 'Rain') is a 1957 Indian Hindi-language crime drama film with Dev Anand and Nutan in the lead roles. Based on the American film On the Waterfront, it is the directorial debut of Shankar Mukherjee.

== Plot ==
Ramu is a young carefree man who raises pigeons. One day, he experiences the shock of his life when his best friend Gopal is murdered. For Ramu, one thing is certain, that he wants revenge.

From a stooge, Ramu learns that behind Gopal's death is a gangster, "Boss". Even as Ramu is in love with his other friend Mohan's sister Chanda, he wants to take revenge for the killing. Even on the wedding night, the opportunity to meet the boss can not be missed by Ramu.

After several twists and with the help of Mohan, they manage to outsmart Boss aka Bihari. Now Ramu can finally devote himself to his wife Chanda, who is expecting their first child.

== Cast ==
- Dev Anand as Ramu
- Nutan as Chanda
- Lalita Pawar as Chanda's Mother
- Anwar Hussain as Mohan, Chanda's brother
- Nana Palsikar as Gopal
- Gope as Lachchu
- Kumkum as Kamli
- Jagdish Sethi as Bihari / Boss
- Madan Puri as Hariya
- Mehmood as Ramu's Neighbour
- Helen as Dancer
- Samson as Captain
- Kundan as Neighbour, Eve teaser
- Narbada Shankar as Old neighbour

== Music ==
Music was by C Ramchandra. Lyrics for all songs were written by Rajinder Krishan

Song	Singer
"Dane Dane Pe Likha Hai"	C. Ramchandra as Chitalkar
"Kehte Hai Pyar Kisko" (Sad)	C. Ramchandra as Chitalkar
"Kehte Hai Pyar Kisko, Panchhi Zara Bata De" (Duet)	C. Ramchandra as Chitalkar, Lata Mangeshkar
"Phir Wahi Chand, Wahi Hum, Wahi Tanhai Hai"	C. Ramchandra as Chitalkar, Lata Mangeshkar
"Yeh Munh Aur Daal Masoor"	Lata Mangeshkar
"Yeh Arzoo Thi Ke Hum"	Lata Mangeshkar
"Hum To Jaani Pyar Karega, Nahin Darega, Nahin Darega"	C. Ramchandra as Chitalkar, Asha Bhosle
"Mr. John, Babakhan.....Ya Qurbaan, Ya Qurbaan"	Asha Bhosle, Chorus
"Ek Nazar Mein Dil Le Jaye, Surat Ho To Aisi Ho, Dekh Jise Chanda Sharmaye, Surat Ho To Aisi Ho"	C. Ramchandra, Talat Mahmood, Mohammed Rafi, Francis Vaz

== Trivia ==
- In the song "Surat Ho To Aisi Ho", a typical Goan folk style lines are sung by Francis Vaz, father of Franco Vaz (Musician drummer who worked a lot with RD Burman)
- The first line of song "Phir Wahi Chand Wahi Hum Wahi Tanhai Hai" are quite similar to the song "Phir Wahi Sham, Wahi Gham, Wahi Tanhai Hai" from the movie Jahan Ara (1964) music by Madan Mohan.
