= Madhusudan Kalelkar =

Indian writer and lyricist (born 1924)

- Born: 22 March 1924; Vengurla, British India (present-day Vengurla, Maharashtra)
- Died: 17 December 1985 (aged 61); Mumbai, Maharashtra
- Occupations: Lyricist; poet; screenwriter
- Years active: 1952–present
- Children: 2

Madhusudan Kalelkar (22 March 1924 – 17 December 1985) was an Indian writer and lyricist, who worked in Marathi and Hindi cinema. He was a recipient of nine Maharashtra State Film Awards and a Filmfare Award.

== Early life ==
Kalelkar was born on 22 March 1924 in Vengurla. After completing his school education in Vengurla, he moved to Mumbai and initially lived in Girgaon. During the Ganesh festival, he wrote his first play there, marking the beginning of his writing career.

== Career ==
Kalelkar began his writing career through theatre. During the Ganesh festival in Girgaon, Mumbai, he wrote his first play. Over the course of his career, he wrote 29 plays and contributed to 111 Marathi and Hindi films. His work included family dramas, serious subjects, comedies and social stories. He also produced four plays. He began writing for films in the 1950s. His Hindi film work included Baarish (1957), Jhumroo (1961), Baat Ek Raat Ki (1962), Naughty Boy (1962), Bluff Master (1963), Joroo Ka Ghulam (1972), Faraar (1975), Geet Gaata Chal (1975), Dulhan Wahi Jo Piya Man Bhaye (1977) and Ankhiyon Ke Jharokhon Se (1978). He also wrote the screenplay for the Hindi film Ek Baar Kaho (1980). His screenplay for Dulhan Wahi Jo Piya Man Bhaye earned him the Filmfare Award for Best Screenplay in 1978.

Among his Marathi films as a writer were Aamhi Jato Amuchya Gava (1968), Pahu Re Kiti Vaat (1963), Aparadh (1969), Jawai Vikat Ghene Aahe (1971), Anolkhi (1973) and Gupchup Gupchup (1983). He wrote the screenplay and dialogues for Ha Mazha Marg Ekla (1963), which received the President’s Award. He also wrote the lyrics for the Marathi film Bala Gau Kashi Angai (1977), including the popular lullaby “Nimbonichya Zadamage.” The song became widely known as a lullaby and earned him Maharashtra State Film Award for Best Lyricist.

Kalelkar received the Maharashtra Government’s award for his plays Aparadh Meech Kela, Sagara Pran Talmalla and Shikar. At the Maharashtra State Film Awards, he received awards on nine occasions for Best Story, Screenplay, Dialogue and Lyrics. He also received the Rasrang Phalke Gauravchinha Award three times. Many of his plays were staged in Gujarati, and some were later adapted into Marathi and Hindi films. His other literary works included the plays Nate Yugayugache and Paying Guest, as well as the character-based book Honeymoon.

== Death ==
Kalelkar continued to work in Marathi theatre and cinema until the later years of his life. He died on 17 December 1985.

== Filmography ==
=== As writer ===
Year	Film	Language	Notes
1952	Akher Jamle	Marathi	Debut as a writer
1955	Sabse Bada Rupaiya	Hindi	Debut as a Hindi writer
1957	Baarish	Hindi	
1957	Pahile Prem	Marathi	
1957	Aaliya Bhogasi	Marathi	
1959	Pativrata	Marathi	
1959	Jaal Saz	Hindi	
1961	Jhumroo	Hindi	
1962	Saptapadi	Marathi	Also lyricist
1962	Baat Ek Raat Ki	Hindi	
1962	Naughty Boy	Hindi	
1963	Pahu Re Kiti Vaat	Marathi	Maharashtra State Film Award for Best Dialogue
1963	Holiday in Bombay	Hindi	
1963	Bluff Master	Hindi	
1968	Aamhi Jato Amuchya Gava	Marathi	Maharashtra State Film Award for Best Screenplay
1968	Annapurna	Hindi	
1969	Aparadh	Marathi	Maharashtra State Film Award for Best Screenplay
1971	Jaane-Anjaane	Hindi	
1971	Jawai Vikat Ghene Aahe	Marathi	
1972	Joroo Ka Ghulam	Hindi	
1973	Anolkhi	Marathi	Maharashtra State Film Award for Best Story
1975	Faraar	Hindi	
1975	Geet Gaata Chal	Hindi	
1976	Change Mande Tere Bande	Hindi	
1977	Bala Gau Kashi Angai	Marathi	Maharashtra State Film Award for Best Lyricist
1977	Dulhan Wahi Jo Piya Man Bhaye	Hindi	Filmfare Award for Best Screenplay
1978	Ankhiyon Ke Jharokhon Se	Hindi	
1978	Bhola Bhala	Hindi	
1978	Anjaam	Hindi	
1980	Ek Baar Kaho	Hindi	
1982	Thorli Jaau	Marathi	
1983	Gupchup Gupchup	Marathi	Maharashtra State Film Award for Best Dialogue
1986	Marumagal	Hindi	

=== As lyricist ===
Year	Film	Song	Notes
1959	Yala Jeevan Aise Naav	"Yala Jeevan Aise Naav"	Debut as a lyricist
1962	Saptapadi	"Saptapadi He Roz Chalate"	
1963	Baiko Maheri Jaate	"Kurwaloo Ka Sakhe"	
1963	Baiko Maheri Jaate	"Preet Karu Lapun Chapun"	
1969	Aparadh	"Sang Kadhi Kalnar Tula"	Also screenwriter
1969	Aparadh	"Sur Tech Chhedita"	Also screenwriter
1969	Aparadh	"Swapnat Pahile Je"	Also screenwriter
1969	Aparadh	"Tujhi Prit Kashi"	Also screenwriter
1977	Bala Gau Kashi Angai	"Nimbonichya Zadamage"	Maharashtra State Film Award for Best Lyricist
1977	Paradh	"Ajun Aathave Ti Raat"	
1977	Paradh	"Kaik Mehfali Aalya Gelya"	
