= Paij Lagnachi =

- Theatrical release poster
- Directed by: Yashwant Bhalkar
- Written by: J. K. Patil
- Screenplay by: Pratap Gangavane
- Produced by: J. K. Patil
- Starring: Varsha Usgaonkar; Prateeksha Lonkar; Avinash Narkar
- Cinematography: Prakash Shinde
- Edited by: Ranjit Shankaran
- Music by: Achyut Thakur
- Production company: J.K. Films
- Release date: 29 December 1997
- Running time: 138 minutes
- Country: India
- Language: Marathi

Paij Lagnachi (transl. The wedding wager) is a 1997 Indian Marathi-language drama film directed by Yashwant Bhalkar. It stars Varsha Usgaonkar, Avinash Narkar, and Prateeksha Lonkar in lead roles.

== Plot ==
The story follows Pooja (Varsha Usgaonkar), a wealthy and spirited college student with a compulsive habit of betting. Despite repeated warnings from her close friend Vaishali (Prateeksha Lonkar) about the consequences of her reckless behavior, Pooja refuses to change. In an attempt to teach her a lesson, Vaishali challenges Pooja to help Shambhu (Avinash Narkar), an intellectually disabled man, recover and lead a normal life within a month. The terms of the bet state that if Pooja fails, she must marry Shambhu. Confident in her abilities, Pooja accepts the challenge. However, as the month unfolds, her experiences with Shambhu profoundly transform her perspective on life, compassion, and love changing her forever, regardless of the bet’s outcome.

== Cast ==
- Varsha Usgaonkar as Pooja
- Avinash Narkar as Shambhu
- Prateeksha Lonkar as Vaishali
- Nilu Phule as Aaba Saheb
- Vijay Chavan as Professor Mahamuni
- Smita Oak as Damlebai
- Madhu Kambikar as Pooja's Mother
- Bal Dhuri as Pooja's Father
- Kishore Nandlaskar as Sanskrit's Professor
- Jagannath Nivangune as College Student
- Seema Chandekar as Akka Saheb

== Soundtrack ==
Paij Lagnachi

Soundtrack album by Achyut Thakur
- Released: 1997
- Genre: Feature film soundtrack
- Language: Marathi
- Label: Zingaat Music

The music is composed by Achyut Thakur and lyrics penned by Jagdish Khebudkar.

Track listing
No.	Title	Singer (s)	Length
1.	"Dhol Ghumla Hey"	Anuradha Paudwal	6:03
2.	"Jivan Ha Sagar"	Suresh Wadkar	5:02
3.	"Laaj Dolyat"	Uttara Kelkar	5:49
4.	"Moharle Mi Sajna"	Anuradha Paudwal	5:05

== Awards ==
- Maharashtra State Film Awards
  - Best Film
  - Best Director
  - Best Actress
  - Best Singer Female (Anuradha Paudwal for moharle mi sajna)
  - Best Singer Male
  - Best Music Director
  - Best Story
  - Best Screenplay
  - Best Dialogue
  - Best Cinematography
  - Best Publicity Design
