= Pierre and Jean =

Novella by Guy de Maupassant

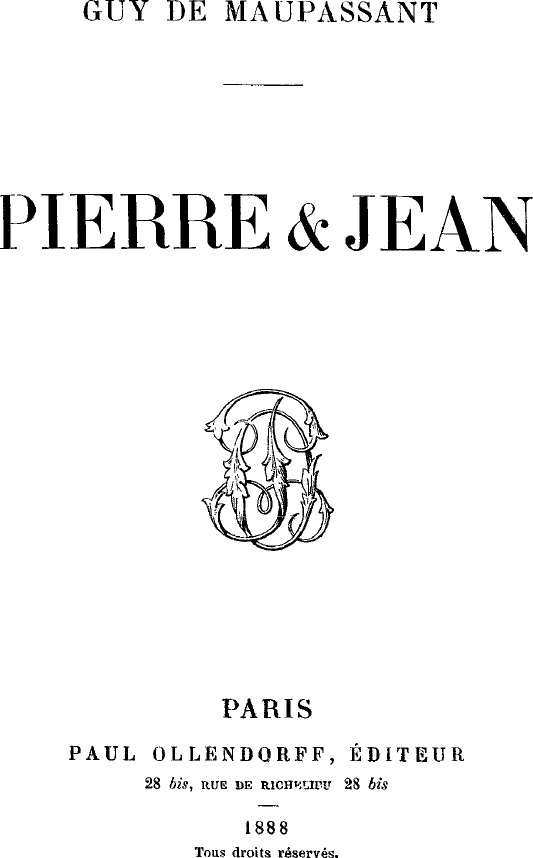
Pierre et Jean

Pierre and Jean (French: Pierre et Jean) is a naturalist or psycho-realist work written by Guy de Maupassant in Étretat in his native Normandy between June and September 1887. This was Maupassant's shortest novel. It appeared in three installments in the Nouvelle Revue and then in volume form in 1888, together with the essay “Le Roman” [“The Novel”]. Pierre et Jean is a realist work, notably so by the subjects on which it treats, including knowledge of one's heredity (whether one is a legitimate son or a bastard), the bourgeoisie, and the problems stemming from money.

== Plot ==
Pierre and Jean are the sons of Gérôme Roland, a jeweller who has retired to Le Havre, and his wife Louise, of a middle-class French family. Pierre works as a doctor, and Jean is a lawyer. Léon Maréchal, a deceased family friend, leaves his inheritance to Jean. This provokes Pierre to doubt the fidelity of his mother and the legitimacy of his brother. Pierre discovers that his theories about his brother's illegitimacy are correct when he discovers his mother has hid and lied about an incriminating portrait of Maréchal and his love letters to her, some of which she burns when she realizes Pierre is learning of her past infidelity. This investigation sparks violent reactions in Pierre, whose external appearance vis-a-vis his mother visibly changes. In his anguish, most notably shown during family meals, he tortures her with allusions to the past that he has now uncovered. Meanwhile, Jean's career and love life improve over the course of the novel while Pierre's life gets significantly worse. Provoked by his brother's accusations of jealousy, Pierre reveals to Jean what he has learned. However, unlike Pierre, Jean offers his mother love and protection. The novel closes with Pierre's departure on an ocean liner.

Thus the novel is organised around the unwelcome appearance of a truth (Jean's illegitimacy), its suppression for the sake of family continuity and the acquisition of wealth, and the expulsion from the family of the legitimate son.

== Preface ==
An essay titled The Novel (Le Roman) precedes the story. Maupassant discusses the general form of the novel, without advocating for any school of writing. Instead, he declares that a single definition can never be reached for what a novel is due to the many forms in which it can appear. (Works such as Don Quixote, The Three Musketeers, and Madame Bovary are listed to illustrate the diversity of the form.)

Maupassant advocates for a writer's freedom to write about a topic that suits their character, and urges critics to judge writing solely based on its artistic value, and whether it fulfills its aims.

"Let the writer be free to understand, observe, and create as he sees fit, as long as he is an artist."

— As translated by Julie Mead in a 2001 edition.

Maupassant also stresses that a novel should not be a perfect imitation of life, but a reconstruction using words, characters, and a narrative. A writer, he believes, should carefully pick the appropriate moments of their characters' lives in order to create a story, discarding the numerous day-to-day occurrences which serve no use to this purpose.

== Adaptations ==
The novel was adapted into the 1926 German-Swedish film Only a Dancing Girl, the 1943 French film Pierre and Jean, the 1952 Mexican film A Woman Without Love, the 2000 Indian film Astitva and the 2015 American film Peter and John.
