= Rahimatpur =

- city
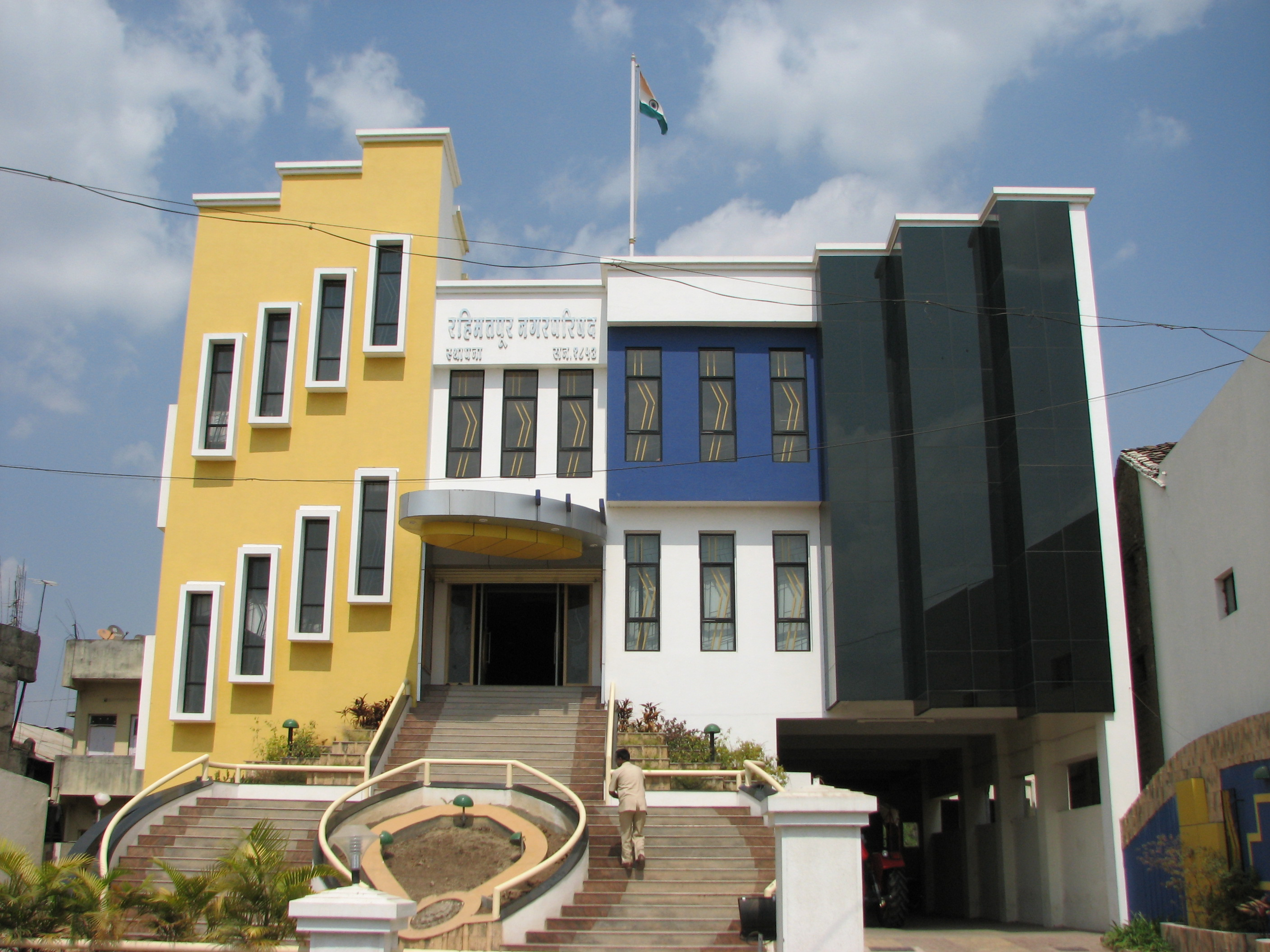
- Rahimatpur Municipal Council building

- Location in Maharashtra, India
- Coordinates: 17.592758°N 74.2023763°E
- Country: India
- State: Maharashtra
- District: Satara
- Elevation: 657 m (2,156 ft)

Population (2011)
  - Total: 16,500

Languages
  - Official: Marathi
- Time zone: UTC+5:30 (IST)
- PIN: 415511

Rahimatpur is a city and a municipal council in Satara district in the Indian state of Maharashtra. The city has an average elevation of 657 metres (2155 feet).

== Demographics ==
As of 2001 India census, Rahimatpur had a population of 25,539. Males constitute 51% of the population and females 49%. Rahimatpur has an average literacy rate of 82%, higher than the national average of 59.5%: male literacy is 78%, and female literacy is 67%. In Rahimatpur, 12% of the population is under 1 years of age.

== Administration ==
Rahimatpur municipal council was established in 1853. It is the second oldest municipal council in India.

== Culture ==
Rahimatpur is the place of birth of the famous Marathi playwright Vasant Kanetkar who wrote the Marathi play Raigadala Jevha Jag Yete. His father was Marathi poet Kavi Girish. Rahimatpur won a Fulbright Scholarship, is a well known educationist, and was awarded a Padma Shri.

Mr. Marutrao Raut, known as MR, was born and brought up at Rahimatpur.

Actress Jyoti Subhash also comes from Rahimatpur.

Rahimatpur's biggest fair is celebrated on Sharad Purnima-Kojagiri Yatra every year.

== Education ==
- Sardar Babasaheb Mane Mahavidyalaya Rahimatpur
- Jr. College of Education D.Ed college Rahimatpur
- Jr.College of Science, Arts, Commerce Rahimatpur
- Adarsh Vidyalaya, Rahimatpur
- Computer World Rahimatpur
- Dr.V.G. Paranjape Vidyalaya Rahimatpur
- Rosary School Rahimatpur
- Kanya Prashala Rahimatpur
- Vasantdada patil Vidyalaya Rahimatpur
- Shree Sant Gadge Maharaj Ashram shala (Brahmapuri) Rahimatpur
- and four government primary schools
