= Ashroonchi Zhali Phule =

Marathi play by Vasant Shankar Kanetkar

Ashroonchi Zhali Phule, also known as Ashrunchi Jhali Phule (lit. 'Tears Turned Into Flowers'), is a Marathi play by Vasant Shankar Kanetkar. In 1966, Kanetkar received a Filmfare Award for Best Story for Aansoo Ban Gaye Phool—a Hindi adaptation of Ashroonchi Zhali Phule. The 1984 film Mashaal is also based on this play.

== Plot ==
The play depicts the turns in fortunes in the lives of the two main protagonists, Vidyanand, a professor of mathematics, and his young protégé Lalya.

Professor Vidyanand is a morally upright, brilliant professor of mathematics in a college in a town in Maharashtra. He comes across an intransigent student, Lalyaa, and succeeds in reforming him. Lalya graduates from college and enters the Indian Police Service as a cadet. Meanwhile, his college is taken over by a local politician, Dharmappa, who also has strong criminal links. Dharmappa wants to exploit the college for commercial gain. When Vidyanand resists, Dharmappa subverts Vidyanand's own colleagues to implicate him falsely under embezzlement charges.

Vidyanand is removed from his position and is thrown in jail. In jail, he undergoes a transformation, and comes out as a hardened criminal, bent on enacting revenge against those who falsely implicated him. He teams up with his childhood friend turned con-man, Shambhu Mahadev, and puts in motion a plan to defraud the politician who has ruined his life.

In the meantime, Lalya, who is now a senior police officer, is assigned to apprehend Vidyanand. Lalya, oblivious to Vidyanand's transformation, embarks on this mission. Eventually, Vidyanand achieves his revenge, but in the process finds he has lost his moral center and compromised the very values he has stood for. In the end, Vidyanand is apprehended by his protégé, but finds redemption in the fact that his life as a teacher caused his protégé Lalya to reform himself.

== Cast ==
The original cast of the play included Chittaranjan Kolhatkar, Prabhakar Panshikar and Kashinath Ghanekar. Panshikar also produced the play.

== Reception ==
The play is termed as "family play" by critics.

On 23 October 2011, the 1125th show of the play was performed in Pune by the production house of Rigved Productions, which has revived old Marathi plays. In 2014, the Marathi play Naandi, which showcased 150-year-old history of Marathi theatre, used scenes from this play.
