= Dattaram Maruti Mirasdar =

Indian writer (1937-2020)

D. M. Mirasdar
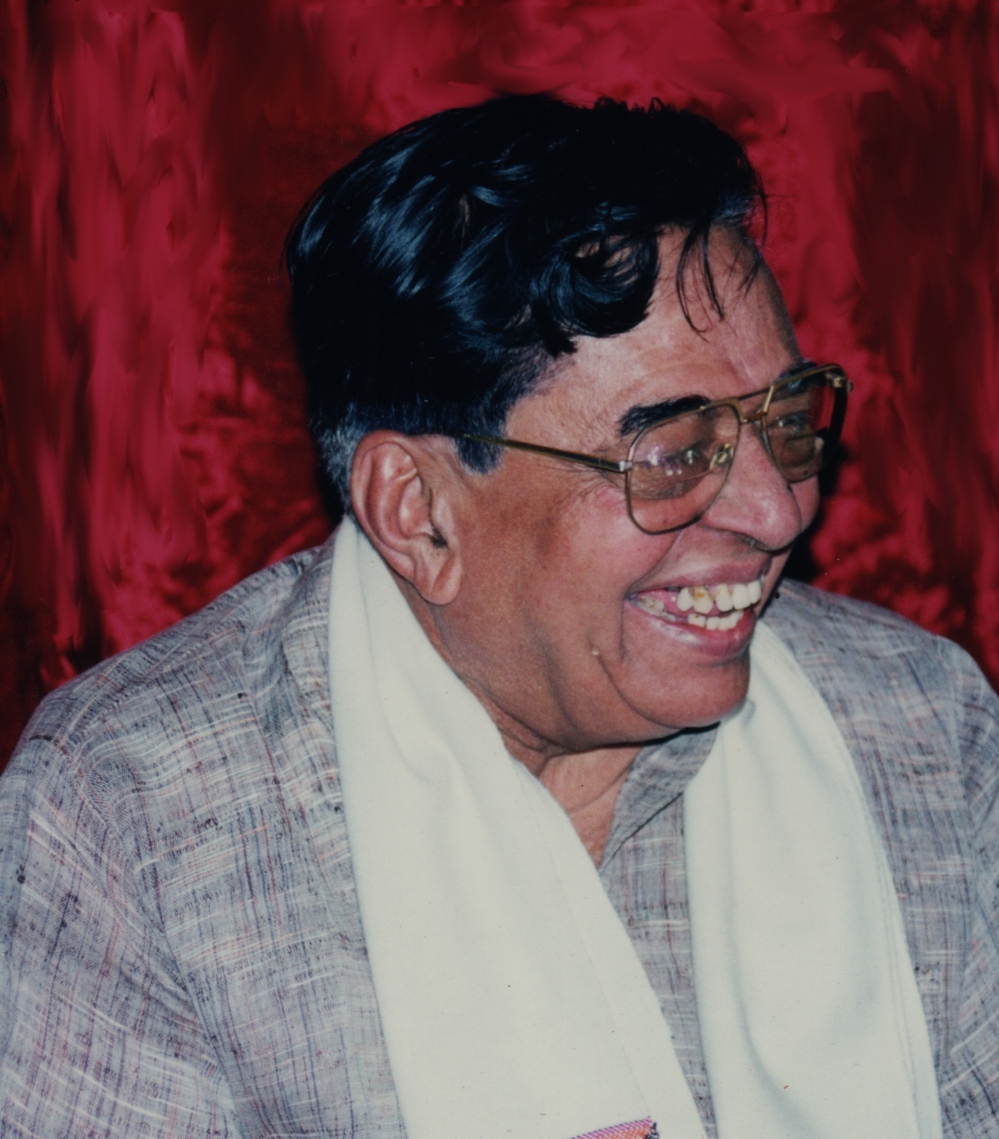
- Born: 14 April 1927
- Died: 2 October 2021 (aged 94); Pune, Maharashtra, India

Dattaram Maruti Mirasdar (14 April 1927 – 2 October 2021), popularly known by his initials ("D Ma" and also as "Dadasaheb") was a Marathi writer and narrator principally of humorous stories. His stories were principally based on rural Maharashtra. The subtle and comic stories he wrote were well read.

== Early life and education ==
Mirasdar was born on 14 April 1927 in Akluj and went to school in Pandharpur. He earned M.A. from the Sir Parashurambhau College in Pune and became a teacher in 1952. He became a professor of Marathi in a M.E.S. Garware College of Commerce in Pune in 1961.

== Career ==
Many of Mirasdar's humorous stories revolve around village life in Maharashtra. However, some of his stories concern the serious social issues and lives of the poor living in villages. His stories Gavat, Ranmanus, Kone Eke Kali, Bhavaki, Hubehub, and Sparsha belong to the latter class.

His first public program as a writer was held in 1962 in Nagpur.

For some years, Shankar Patil, Vyankatesh Madgulkar, and Mirasdar jointly presented, in different towns in Maharashtra, highly popular public recitations of their short stories.

Mirasdar was the Acting President of Maharashtra Sahitya Parishad, Pune. In 1998, he was the president of the 71st Akhil Bharatiya Marathi Sahitya Sammelan in Parli, Maharashtra. In 2015, he received the Vinda Karandikar Jeevan Gaurav Puraskar from the Department of Marathi Language, Government of Maharashtra. In 2018, he was awarded the first-ever Sahityaseva Krutadnyata Puraskar.

== Death ==
Mirasdar died on 2 October 2021 at the age of 94 in Pune.

== Books ==
- Majhya Bapachi Pend (1957)
- Bhutancha Janma (1958)
- Hubehub (1960)
- Sutti Ani Itar Ekankika (1964)
- Mirasdari (1966)
- Makadmeva (1970)
- Chakatya (1973)
- Hasnaval (1975)
- Chutakyanchya Goshti (1976)
- Gudagulya (1977)
- Mi Ladachi Maina Tumachi (1979)
- Bhokarwadichya Goshti (1983)
- Goshtich Goshti (1993)
- Khade Ani Orakhade (1997)
- Nivadak Da Ma
- Gappangan
- Navetil Tin Pravasi
- Sarmisal
- Angatpangat
- Virangula
- Ganara Mulukh
- Javaibapunchya Goshti
- Bendbaja
- Gammat Goshti
- Pharmas Goshti
