= Maharashtra State Film Award for Best Story =

Indian film award

- Awarded for: Best story in a Marathi film
- Reward: ₹100,000 (US$1,100)
- First award: 1967
- Final award: 2024

Highlights
- Total awarded: 57
- First winner: Kavi Sanjeev

The Maharashtra State Film Award for Best Story was instituted in 1967, and is presented annually at the Maharashtra State Film Awards of India to an actor for best performance in a Marathi cinema film. The awardees are decided by a jury constituted every year. They are announced by the Minister for Cultural Affairs and are presented by the Chief Minister.

== Winners ==
Year	Recipient(s)	Film	Ref.
1967	Kavi Sanjeev	Patlachi Soon	
1968	Not Awarded		
1969	Bhalji Pendharkar	Tambdi Mati	
1970	Ram Kelkar	Mumbaicha Jawai	
1971	Vijay Tendulkar	Shantata! Court Chalu Aahe	
1972-73	Madhusudan Kalelkar	Anolkhi	
1974	R. B. Dighe	Kartiki	
1975	Vijay Tendulkar	Samna	
1976	Shankar Babaji Patil	Choricha Mamla	
1977	Chintamani Tryambak Khanolkar	Chaani	
1978	Gopal Nilkanth Dandekar	Devkinandan Gopala	
1979	Anant Mane	Haldi Kunku	
1980	V. K. Naik	Aapli Mansa	
1981	Ranjit Desai	Nagin	
1982	Snehlata Dasnoorkar	Shapit	
1983	Vasant Sabnis	Raghu Maina	
1984	Jaywant Dalvi	Mahananda	
1985	Baba Kadam	Devashappath Khar Sangen	
1986	Ratnakar Matkari	Majha Ghar Majha Sansar	
1987	Dilip Ambekar	Kashasathi Premasathi	
1988	Arvind Khanolkar	Nashibwan	
1989	Bharat Sasane	Suryoday	
1990	Ramakant Kavthekar	Aaghat	
1991	Ashok Patole	Chaukat Raja	
1992	Aniruddh Punarvasu	Aahuti	
1993	Ujjwal Thengadi	Vazir	
1994	Uttam Bandu Tupe	Bhasma	
1995	Sumitra Bhave	Doghi	
1996	Vijay Kuwlekar	Rao Saheb	
1997	J. K. Patil	Paij Lagnachi	
1998	Ajay Phansekar	Ratra Aarambh	
1999	Vijay Kuwlekar	Gharabaher	
2000	Dr. Chandrashekhar Phansalkar	Astitva	
2001	Suhas Shirvalkar	Devki	
2002	Sumitra Bhave	Dahavi Fa	
2003	Madhavi Gharpure	Shwaas	
2004	Jaywant Dalvi	Uttarayan	
2005	Gajendra Ahire	Sarivar Sari	
2006	Madhuri Ashargade	Aaishappath	
2007	Mannu Bhandari	Evdhasa Aabhal	
2008	Rajan Khan	Dhudgus	
2009	Kiran Yadnopavit	Sukhant	
2010	Aaba Gaikwad	Antardah	
2011	Saurabh Bhave	Taryanche Bait	
2012	Usha Datar	Kaksparsh	
2013	Gayatri Kolte	Taani	
2014	Madhugandha Kulkarni	Elizabeth Ekadashi	
2015	Rajan Khan	Halal	
2016	Rahul Chaudhari	Bandookya	
2017	Deepak Gawade	Idak - The Goat	
2018	Sudhakar Reddy Yakkanti	Naal	
2019	Bakibab Borkar	Panghrun	
2020	Vitthal Kale	Baaplyok	
2021	Mangesh Joshi	Karkhanisanchi Waari	
2021	Archana Borhade	Karkhanisanchi Waari	
2022	Sumit Tambe	Samaira	
2023	Sudhakar Reddy Yakkanti	Naal 2	
2024	Jayant Somalkar	Sthal	

== Multiple wins ==
Individuals with two or more Best Story awards:

Wins	Actress
2	Vijay Tendulkar; Jaywant Dalvi; Sumitra Bhave; Sudhakar Reddy Yakkanti; Vijay Kuwlekar
