= Aansoo Ban Gaye Phool =

1969 film by Satyen Bose

- Poster
- Directed by: Satyen Bose
- Written by: Vasant Kanetkar; Nabendu Ghosh; Govind Moonis
- Based on: Ashroonchi Zhali Phule by Vasant Kanetkar
- Produced by: Anoop Kumar
- Starring: Deb Mukherjee; Alka; Ashok Kumar; Nirupa Roy; Pran; Helen
- Cinematography: P. Isaac
- Edited by: Wamanrao
- Music by: Laxmikant-Pyarelal
- Distributed by: Anoop Kumar Productions
- Release date: 1969
- Country: India
- Language: Hindi

Aansoo Ban Gaye Phool (lit. 'Tears Turned into Flowers') is a 1969 Indian Hindi-language film directed by Satyen Bose. The film stars Ashok Kumar, Nirupa Roy, Pran, Helen, Deb Mukherjee, and Alka in lead roles. The music is by Laxmikant-Pyarelal with lyrics by Taj Bhopali and Govind Munees. It is an adaptation of the Marathi play Ashroonchi Zhali Phule.

== Plot ==
Vidyanand is an honest and ideal school principal. He gives moral instructions to an orphan student Chandrashekhar. The chairman of the school management is a smuggler and rich man. For some reason he gets the principal falsely implicated in a fraud and due to this he was imprisoned for some time. After coming out he takes revenge with the help of his fast friend Shambhu who was also a fellow smuggler like chairman but not as successful because he was not that intelligent and disciplined. With Vidyanand his illegal business goes up and they together ruin chairman. Meanwhile, Chandrashekhar becomes an ideal police inspector and posted at their place. He catches Shambhu. Seeing his student as inspector Vidyanand surrenders and tells he is the real culprit but Chandrashekhar refuses to believe and regret catching him. He is sad for this but Vidyanand is happy for his repentance and seeing his student a successful officer. He directs his wife Dr. Sumitra to consider Chandrashekhar as their long dead son.

== Cast ==
- Deb Mukherjee as CBI Inspector Chandrashekhar
- Alka as Krishna
- Ashok Kumar as Professor Vidyanand
- Nirupa Roy as Dr. Sumitra
- Pran as Shambhu Mahadev Rao
- Gautam Mukherjee
- Helen as Neelam

== Soundtrack ==
Song	Singer
"Ab Chahe Kisise Pyar Karo"	Kishore Kumar
"Yeh Dil Sada Dhadka Kiya"	Kishore Kumar
"Jane Kaisa Hai Mera Deewana, Kabhi Apna Sa Lage"	Kishore Kumar, Asha Bhosle
"Meharban Mehboob Dilbar"	Asha Bhosle
"Ho O, Suno To Jani"	Asha Bhosle

== Awards ==
- Filmfare Best Supporting Actor Award for Pran
- Filmfare Best Story Award for Vasant Kanetkar
