= Bala Gau Kashi Angai =

- Theatrical release poster
- Directed by: Kamalakar Torne
- Screenplay by: Madhusudan Kalelkar
- Story by: Madhusudan Kalelkar
- Produced by: M. S. Salvi
- Starring: Asha Kale; Vikram Gokhale; Satish Dubhashi; Nayantara; Madhukar Toradmal; Raja Bapat; Vatsala Deshmukh
- Cinematography: Ratnakar Laad
- Edited by: Bhanudaas Divkar
- Music by: N. Dutta
- Release date: 14 April 1977
- Country: India
- Language: Marathi

Bala Gau Kashi Angai is a Marathi-language Family Drama film was released on 4 April 1977. It is produced by M.S.Salvi and directed by Kamlakar Torne. Film Stars Asha Kale, Vikram Gokhale and Nayantara in Lead Roles. In the film, Alka loses her mind when her baby dies after Madhuri accidentally drops him. Feeling guilty, Madhuri marries Sridhar with the intention of giving her baby to Alka, which may help her recover.

== Plot ==
Madhuri, a resident in Pune is the daughter of a retired Forest Officer and lives with her brother and parents. Her father's friend's son, Vasant is staying with them till he completes his higher studies. Vasant and Madhuri are childhood friends and she is in love with Vasant, but he loves Alka, a girl from his college. One day, Vasant leaves urgently to meet his ailing father in Belgaum and returns with Alka, now his wife. Alka gives birth to a son and the boy is more attached to Madhuri, who also tends to shower him with motherly affection. One day, the baby accidentally slips from Madhuri's hands and dies. As a result, Alka goes mad. Madhuri in turn, marries Shridhar in order to bear a child and offer it to Alka with the hope of her recovery.

== Cast ==
- Asha Kale as Madhuri Kanhere
- Vikram Gokhale as Vasant
- Nayantara as Alka
- Satish Dubhashi as Shridhar
- Madhukar Toradmal as Anant Kanhere
- Vatsala Deshmukh as Anant's wife
- Raja Bapat as Nana Gokhale
- Sarswati Bodas
- Datta Bhatt
- Ramesh Salgaonkar
- Shantaram Desai
- Jaywant Pawar
- Shantabai Sathe

== Production ==
During the shooting of song Nimbonichya zadamage, Asha Kale fell ill and the doctor advised her to rest, but Asha Kale completed the shoot of this song despite her ill health.

Shooting of the film is done at Technician United Studio Mumbai.

== Soundtrack ==
Bala Gau Kashi Angai

Soundtrack album by N. Datta
- Recorded: H. M. V. Record Company Mumbai
- Genre: Soundtrack
- Length: 30:57

All the songs were choreographed by sohanlal. The music has been directed by N. Dutta and all lyrics were written by Jagdish Khebudkar except nimbonichya jhadamage which is written by madhusudan kalekar. "Nimbonichya Zadamage" was very popular song among children.

=== Track listing ===
- "Dhundit Gau Mastit Rahu" (Lyricist(s): Madhusudan Kelkar, Jagdish Khebudkar) - Mahendra Kapoor, Asha Bhosle
- "Nimbonichya Jhadamage" - Suman Kalyanpur
- "Halke Halke Jojawa" - Usha Mangeshkar
- "Are Man Mohana" - Asha Bhosle
- "Sansar Mandate Mi" - Asha Bhosle
- "Tula Kadhitari Mee" - Jaywant Kulkarni, Usha Mangeshkar
