= Chumbak =

- Theatrical release poster
- Directed by: Sandeep Modi
- Written by: Saurabh Bhave; Sandeep Modi
- Produced by: Aruna Bhatia; Naren Kumar; Cape of Good Films
- Starring: Swanand Kirkire
- Cinematography: Rangarajan Ramabadran
- Edited by: Chandrashekhar Prajapati
- Music by: Saket Kanetkar
- Production companies: Kyra Kumar Kreations; Cape of Good Films
- Distributed by: AA Films
- Release dates: 13 October 2017 (Mumbai); 27 July 2018 (India)
- Running time: 118 minutes
- Country: India
- Language: Marathi

Chumbak (also designated as Chumbak - THE LOTTERY) is a 2018 Indian Marathi-language slice of life drama film directed by Sandeep Modi, produced by Aruna Bhatia, Naren Kumar and Cape of Good Films and stars a renowned lyricist Swanand Kirkire in the lead role. It had its world premiere on 13 October 2017 in MAMI 19th Mumbai Film Festival.

Later, the film attracted attention of Akshay Kumar who found it "honest and pure", announcing on social media, and also went on to present it, making his Marathi cinema debut as a presenter. It was released in cinemas on 27 July 2018. Trailer for the film was released on 5 July 2018.

== Plot ==
Chumbak is a coming-of-age story of Baalu, a teen restaurant worker boy who decides to con someone to fulfill his dream and escape his wretched life, but instead finds a mentally-ill village dim-wit - Prasanna (Swanand Kirkire) as his only victim. Baalu now finds himself torn between his morality and dreams, as the two find themselves on a journey that changes their lives.

== Cast ==
- Swanand Kirkire as Prasanna – A 45-year-old mentally challenged man from Maharashtra.
- Sahil Jadhav as Baalu – A 15-year-old restaurant worker migrant boy in Mumbai.
- Sangram Desai as Disco - A 17-year-old mobile repairer migrant boy in Mumbai.
