= Vasant Kanetkar =

Indian writer (1922-2000)

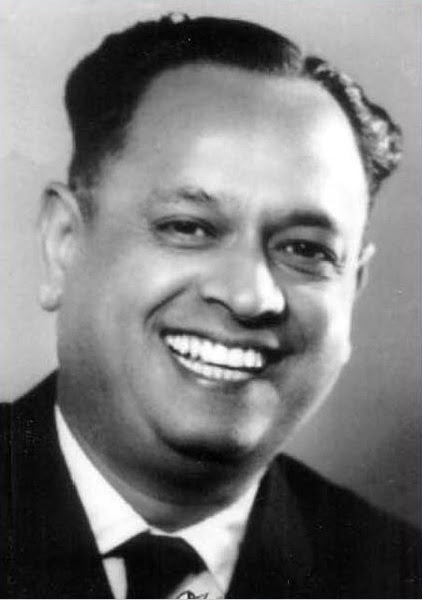
- Born: Vasant Shankar Kanetkar; 20 March 1922; Rahimatpur, Satara District, Maharashtra
- Died: 31 January 2000 (aged 77)
- Writing career
- Notable awards: Padma Shri (1992)

Vasant Shankar Kanetkar (20 March 1922 – 31 January 2000) was an Indian Marathi-language playwright and novelist from Maharashtra.

He was born in the town of Rahimatpur in Satara District, Maharashtra. His father, Shankar Keshav Kanetkar, was a poet who wrote poetry under the pen name Kavi Girish and was a founding member of a circle of poets named Ravikiran Mandal. Vasant Kanetkar was educated in Pune and Sangli. After passing M.A. exam in 1948 from Sangli, he joined as a lecturer in Nashik in 1950. He received wide admiration from the audience after his play 'Raigadala Jevha Jag Yete' (रायगडाला जेव्हा जाग येते). He kept the Marathi commercial theatre vibrant and live for more than two decades. Five of his plays received best play award of the year given by Maharashtra State Government. In 1966, Kanetkar received a Filmfare Award for Best Story for the Hindi movie Aansoo Ban Gaye Phool, which was an adaptation of Ashroonchi Zhali Phule. Kanetkar received a Padma Shri award in 1992 for his literary accomplishments.

== List of plays ==
The following is a partial list of Kanetkar's plays:

- Devanche Manorajya (देवांचे मनोराज्य)
- Mala kahi Sangaychay! (मला काही सांगायचंय)
- Beiman (बेइमान)
- Vedyache Ghar Unhat (वेड्याचे घर ऊन्हात)
- Prema, Tujha Ranga Kasa? (प्रेमा, तुझा रंग कसा?)
- Ashroonchi Zhali Phule (अश्रूंची झाली फुले)
- Raigadala Jewha Jag Yete (रायगडाला जेंव्हा जाग येते)
- Himalayachi Sawali (हिमालयाची सावली)
- Wishawrukshachi Chhaya (विषवृक्षाची छाया)
- Lekure Udanda Jahali (लेकुरे उदंड जाहली)
- Premachya Gawa Jawe (प्रेमाच्या गावा जावे)
- Jithe Gawatas Bhale Phutatat(जिथे गवतास भाले फुटतात)
- Suryachi Pille(सूर्याची पिल्ले)
- Ithe Oshalala Mrutyu (इथे ओशाळला मृत्यु)
- Matsyagandha (मत्स्यगंधा)
- Akhercha sawal (अखेरचा सवाल)
- Rang Umalatya Manache (रंग उमलत्या मनाचे )
- Kasturimrug (कस्तुरीमृग )
- Choo Mantar (छू मंतर!)
- Fakta Ekach Karan (फक्त एकच कारण )
- Garudzep (गरुडझेप) (कादंबरीकार रणजीत देसाई यांच्याबरोबर)
- Mira Madhura (मीरा मधुरा)
- Nal Damayanti (नल दमयंती)
- Mansala Dankha Maticha (माणसाला डंख मातीचा)
- Ek Roop-Anek Rang (एक रूप -अनेक रंग)
- Wadal Mansalataya (वादळ माणसाळतंय)
- Madanbadha (मदनबाधा)
- Sonchapha (सोनचाफा)
- Aakasmithi (आकाशमिठी)
- Sukha Pahata (सुख पाहता)
- Tuza Tu Wadhavi Raja (तुझा तू वाढवी राजा )
- Mala Kahi Sangayachaya (मला काही सांगायचय)
- Ithe Oshalala Mrityu (इथे ओशाळला मृत्यू)
- Gharat Phulala Parijat (घरात फुलला पारिजात)
- Goshta Janmantarichi (गोष्ट जन्मांतरीची)
- Gaath Aahe Mazyashi (गाठ आहे माझ्याशी)
- Kadhitari Kothetari (कधीतरी कोठेतरी)
- Pankhana Odh Pawalanchi (पंखांना ओढ पावलांची)
- Gaganbhedi (गगनभेदी)

One Act Plays

- Vyasancha Kayakalpa (व्यासांचा कायाकल्प)
- Gad Gela Pan Sinha Jaga Zala (गड गेला पण सिंह जागा झाला)
- Anandibai Anibani Puka Ratat (आनंंदीबाई आणीबाणी पुकारतात)
- Madrashine Kela Marathi (मद्राशीने केला मराठी भ्रतार)
- Zende-Patil Maqhavidyalayat (झेंडे पाटील महाविद्यालयात)
- Divyasamor Andher (दिव्यासमोर अंधार)

Kanetkar's plays covered a wide range of subject matters. His favorite subject matters were the life of warrior-king Shivaji from Maharashtra, the cultural reformation in late nineteenth-century Maharashtra, human relationships, and the decline of morality in post-independence India.

== List of Novels ==
Kanetkar wrote four novels.

- Ghar (घर)
- Pankha (पंख)
- Porka (पोरका)
- Tethe Chal Raani (तेथे चल राणी) (Translation of Jean-Paul Sartre's "Les Jeux Sont Faites")

== Recognition ==
In 1970, Kanetkar received a Filmfare Award for Best Story for the Hindi movie Aansoo Ban Gaye Phool, the story having been an adaptation of his Marathi play Ashrunchi Jhali Phule.

He presided over Marathi Sahitya Sammelan in 1988.

Kanetkar received a Padma Shri award in 1992 for his literary accomplishments.
