= Firebrand (2019 film) =

2019 film by Aruna Raje

- Film poster
- Directed by: Aruna Raje
- Written by: Aruna Raje
- Starring: Usha Jadhav; Sachin Khedekar; Girish Kulkarni
- Production company: Purple Pebble Pictures
- Distributed by: Netflix
- Release date: 22 February 2019
- Running time: 116 minutes
- Country: India
- Language: Marathi

Firebrand is a 2019 Indian Marathi-language drama film written and directed by Aruna Raje. The film features Usha Jadhav, Sachin Khedekar and Girish Kulkarni in the lead roles.

The film was released on 22 February 2019 on Netflix. Firebrand is a contemporary story of self-discovery and catharsis. This was Aruna Raje's comeback movie after a 15-year absence.

== Plot ==
Sunanda Raut is a feminist divorce lawyer, fending off injustice in Indian courtrooms for women such as rape, domestic abuse, mental illness, the complexities of marriage, sex and love. On top of this, she has to deal with her own real-life trauma.

== Cast ==
- Usha Jadhav as Sunanda Raut
- Girish Kulkarni as Madhav Patkar
- Sachin Khedekar as Anand Pradhan
- Rajeshwari Sachdev as Divya Patel Pradhan
- Puja Agarwal as Natasha
- Amol Deshmukh as Dr. Nadkarni
- Sanjeev Dhuri as Judge Pandurang Thipse
- Ganesh Jamble as Ramesh Bodke
- Mrunal Oak as Anuya Pradhan
- Vaibhavi Pardeshi as Renukabai (maid)
- Pooja Raibagi as Smita Waghmare
- Laxman Singh Rajput as Dileep
- Rushad Rana as Advocate - Freddie Mehta
- Ranjeet Randive as Shankar Bhau
- Ankita Raval as Radhika

== Release ==
It was released on 22 February 2019 on Netflix.
