= Sandeep Modi =

Indian filmmaker

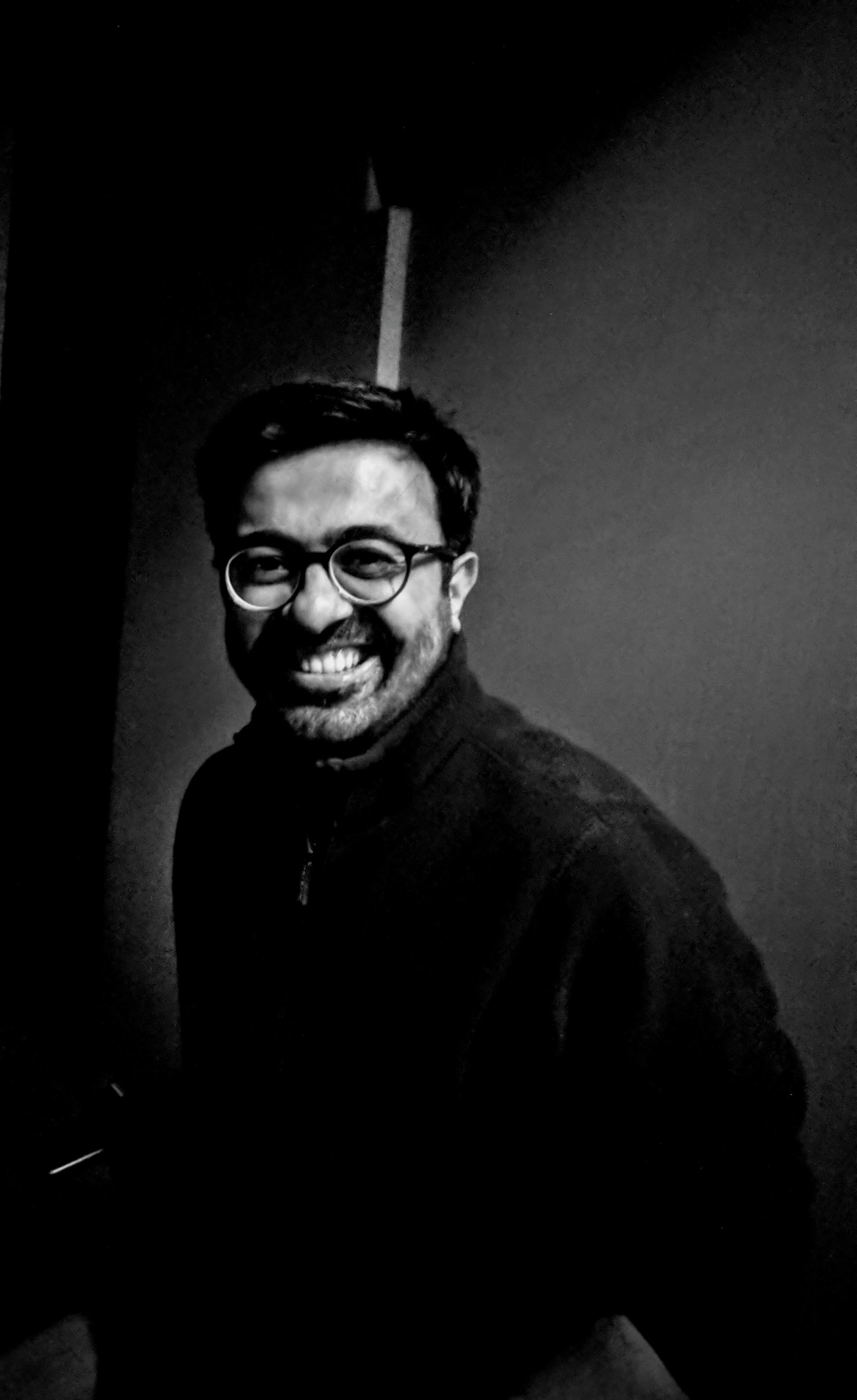
- Sandeep in 2023
- Born: Sandeep Modi; 28 October 1982 (age 43); India
- Occupation: Film director
- Known for: Chumbak; Aarya; The Night Manager
- Relatives: Shreni Modi (wife)

Sandeep Modi, born on 28 October 1982, is an Indian filmmaker, best known for writing and directing the thriller series Aarya, which was released on Disney+ Hotstar and stars Sushmita Sen. The series was India's submission to the 2021 International Emmy Awards. Modi is also known for being the showrunner and director of The Night Manager (Indian TV series), starring Aditya Roy Kapur, Anil Kapoor and Sobhita Dhulipala, produced by Ink Factory and Banijay, and is currently streaming on Disney+ Hotstar. Other than TV series, Modi has also written and directed Chumbak, which had a world premiere on October 13, 2017, at MAMI 19th Mumbai Film Festival.

Modi is an alumnus of the Film and Television Institute of India (FTII). Prior to film studies, he completed a degree in engineering.

== Career ==
Sandeep started his career as an assistant director on films such as Sarkar Raj (2008), Delhi 6 (2009), What's Your Raashee? (2009), Khelein Hum Jee Jaan Sey (2010), and Joker (2012). He also assisted Ram Madhvani in Neerja (2016), which portrays the true story of Neerja, a flight attendant who risked her life to save the passengers from terrorists. Sandeep directed the short film Vanvaas, starring Piyush Mishra which was officially screened at the 2015 Toronto International Film Festival and the 2016 DFW South Asian Film Festival. He also obtained a degree in BScIT from Lala Lajpatrai College-Mumbai.

== Awards ==
In 2015, his short film Best Friends Forever won him the National Film Award for "Best Film on Family Welfare".
