= Tendlya =

2023 Indian Marathi-language film

- Promotional release poster
- Directed by: Sachin J Jadhav; Nachiket Waikar
- Screenplay by: Sachin J Jadhav; Nachiket Waikar
- Story by: Sachin J Jadhav
- Produced by: Sachin J Jadhav; Chaitanya Kale
- Starring: Adwaita Jadhav; Sambhaji Tangde; Ankita Yadav; Vitthal Nagnath Kale; Ketan Visal; Firoz Shaikh; Yash Mane
- Cinematography: Balu Sandilyasa
- Edited by: Nachiket Waikar
- Music by: Bhanu Dhande
- Production companies: Ashwamedh Motion Pictures; Tudip Entertainment
- Distributed by: August Entertainment
- Release date: 5 May 2023
- Country: India
- Language: Marathi
- Budget: ₹1.70 crore

Tendlya is a 2023 Marathi-language comedy drama film directed by Sachin J Jadhav and Nachiket Waikar Music by Bhanu Dhande. The film starring Adwaita Jadhav, Sambhaji Tangde, Ankita Yadav, Vitthal Nagnath Kale, Ketan Visal and Firoz Shaikh. The film won the National Film Award for Best Audiography at India's 66th National Film Awards. It was theatrically released on 5 May 2023.

== Cast ==
- Firoz Shaikh as Gajya
- Aman Kamble as Tendlya
- Adwaita Jadhav
- Sambhaji Tangde
- Ankita Yadav
- Vitthal Nagnath Kale
- Ketan Visal
- Yash Mane

== Reception ==
Tendlya movie received positive reviews from critics. Jaideep Pathakji of The Times of India gave the film 3 stars out of 5 and Wrote "While there are certain loose ends and the flow of the film drops in between, largely, the young makers have hit this one out of the park". A reviewer of ABP Majha Says "This film, which tells about the relationship with the god of cricket, directly touches the hearts of the audience due to its rural setting. This is the success of this movie". A reviewer of Maharashtra Times wrote "In short, this 'Tendlya' has hit the ground running. This thing of dream fulfillment is 'striking'". A reviewer of Sakal says "This is not just a film about cricket fanatics, people who like Sachin Tendulkar, but also about human beings. Therefore, people of every generation must watch it".

== Accolades ==
Awards	Year	Category	Recipient(s)	Result	Ref.
National Film Awards	2018	Best Audiography	Gaurav Varma	Won	
56th Maharashtra State Film Awards	2019	Best Debut Actor, Best Debut Film Direction	Tendlya	Won	
