= Chittaranjan Kolhatkar =

- चित्तरंजन चिंतामणराव कोल्हटकर
- Born: Chittaranjan Chintamanrao Kolhatkar; 15 January 1923; Amravati, Maharashtra, India
- Died: 25 October 2009 (aged 86); Pune, Maharashtra, India
- Occupation: Actor
- Parent: Chintaman Ganesh Kolhatkar

Chittaranjan Chintamanrao Kolhatkar (Marathi: चित्तरंजन चिंतामणराव कोल्हटकर; 15 January 1923 – 25 October 2009) was an Indian film and theatre actor.

Born in 1923 in the Amravati district of Maharashtra, Kolhatkar began his film career in 1944, appearing in the film Garibanche Rajya. His theatre debut was in Bhavbandhan written by Ram Ganesh Gadkari. He was associated with many dramas written by his cousin Balakrishna Hari Kolhatkar.

Politically, Kolhatkar was a firm supporter of the Hindu nationalist political ideology Hindutva. He appeared in more than 100 films.

Kolhatkar was admitted to the Dinanath Mangeshkar Hospital in Pune on 13 October 2009 after suffering a fall during his evening walk. On 25 October, he suffered a heart attack and died, aged 86.

== Works ==
As actor

- Mohityanchi Manjula (Film, 1963)
- Ashroonchi Zhali Phule (Play)
