= Chintaman Ganesh Kolhatkar =

Marathi Stage Actor and Playwright

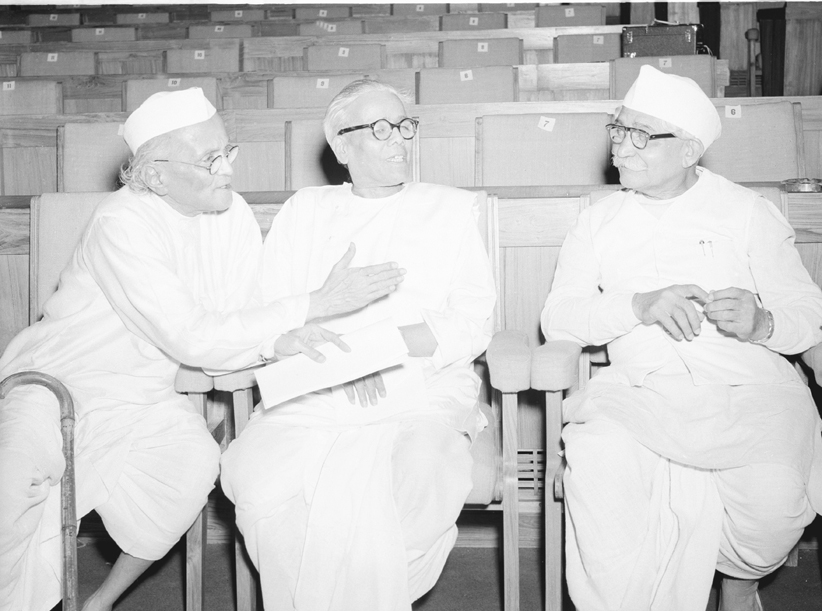
- Kolhatkar (centre) in conversation with Mama Warerkar (left) and Jaishankar Sundari (right) at the presentation of Sangeet Natak Akademi Awards in New Delhi on 31 March 1957
- Born: 12 March 1891; Nevare, Bombay Presidency
- Died: 23 November 1959 (aged 68)
- Other names: Chintamanrao Kolhatkar
- Children: Chittaranjan Kolhatkar

Chintaman Ganesh Kolhatkar (12 March 1891 – 23 November 1959), also known as Chintamanrao Kolhatkar, was a well known Marathi stage actor, director, producer, and playwright.

== Career ==
He joined the Maharashtra Natak Mandali in 1911, but after a year left for the Shri Bharat Natak Mandali. He entered the Kirloskar Natak Mandali in 1914 and helped establish the Balwant Sangit Natak Mandali with Dinanath Mangeshkar in 1918. His greatest performances came in R. G. Gadkari's plays, in Punyaprabhav (1916), Rajsanyas (1922), and especially as the villain Ghanashyam in Bhavbandn in 1919. He tried the movie industry in 1933 and acted as the tyrant Shakara in Vasantsena in 1942. However, he failed in this medium and returned to theatre. He joined Gangadharpant Londhe's Rajaram Sangit Mandali, worked with M. G. Rangnekar's Natyaniketan, and established his own company, Lalit Kala Kunj which gave P. L. Deshpande a break. Kolhatkar was a non-singing actor, who took roles in Hindi and Urdu as well.

Jawaharlal Nehru once called him Bahurupi (i.e. 'many-formed'), which Kolhatkar used as the title for his autobiography. He also wrote character sketches of several playwrights titled Majhe natakkar, and a five-act play, Purnavatar in 1924.

He was awarded Sangeet Natak Akademi Award in 1957, given by the Sangeet Natak Akademi, India's National Academy of Music, Dance & Drama.
