= Bhonga =

Marathi language drama film

- Theatrical release poster
- Directed by: Shivaji Lotan Patil
- Written by: Shivaji Lotan Patil; Nishant Natharam Dhapse
- Produced by: Amol Laxman Kagne; Shivaji Lotan Patil; Arun Hiraman Mahajan
- Cinematography: Ramani Das
- Release date: 24 September 2021
- Running time: 95 minutes
- Country: India
- Language: Marathi

Bhonga (transl. Speaker) is an Indian Marathi-language drama film Produced by Amol Laxman Kagne, Shivaji Lotan Patil and Arun Hiraman Mahajan. directed by Shivaji Lotan Patil and written by the director himself and Nishant Natharam Dhapse. Ramani Das has choreographed all songs. It features Amol Kagane and Dipti Dhotre in lead roles. The film also stars Kapil Kamble and Shripad Joshi. The film has won a total of five awards like Best Picture, at the Maharashtra State Government's 56th Film Awards. The film also won the Best Marathi Film award in the feature film category, at 66th National Film Awards.

== Story ==
The film revolves around a middle-class Muslim family where a nine-month-old baby is suffering from a chronic disease named Cerebral hypoxia. This disease causes the amount of oxygen in the blood starts to drop and it impacts the brain. The family decides to leave their home and transfers to another place due to financial difficulties. The new house stands back from a mosque. The movie then recounts the story of the child's father, uncle, and other villagers.

== Casts ==
- Amol Kagane
- Dipti Dhotre
- Kapil Kamble
- Shripad Joshi

== Development ==
A solo poster of Amol Kagne was revealed in August 2019.

== Accolades ==
Year	Ceremony	Category	Result	Ref.
2018	66th National Film Awards	Best Feature Film in Marathi	Won	
2018	55th Maharashtra State Film Awards	Maharashtra State Film Award for Best Rural Film	Won	
2018	55th Maharashtra State Film Awards	Maharashtra State Film Award for Best Director	Won	
2018	55th Maharashtra State Film Awards	Maharashtra State Film Award for Best Film	Won	
