= Balakrishna Hari Kolhatkar =

Playwright (1926–1994)

- Born: September 25, 1926
- Died: June 30, 1994 (aged 67)
- Other names: Bal Kolhatkar
- Known for: Marathi theater

Balakrishna Hari Kolhatkar (September 25, 1926 – June 30, 1994), also known as Bal Kolhatkar, was a Marathi playwright, poet, actor, and director.

Chittaranjan Kolhatkar, his cousin, staged many of his plays. Bal Kolhatkar liked to have nine syllables in the names of his dramas. A partial list of his dramas is provided below.

1. उघडले स्वर्गाचे दार
2. दुरितांचे तिमिर जावो
3. देणा-याचे हात हजार
4. देव दीनाघरी धावला
5. पण्डितराज जगन्नाथ (विद्याधर गोखले)
6. लहानपण देगा देवा
7. वाहतो ही दुर्वांची जुडी
8. वेगळं व्हायचंय मला
9. सीमेवरून परत जा
