= Sharad Pilgaonkar =

Indian film producer and writer

Sharad Pilgaonkar was an Indian film producer and story writer associated primarily with Marathi cinema. Working under his production banner Manorama Films, he produced several Marathi films during the 1970s and 1980s, including Ashtavinayak (1979), which won the Maharashtra State Film Award for Best Second Film. He is the father of actor Sachin Pilgaonkar.

== Career ==
Sharad Pilgaonkar established Manorama Films and produced Marathi-language films over roughly two decades. His earliest screen credits as story writer date to the late 1960s, including the 1969 Telugu film Vichitra Kutumbam.

In 1977 he produced the Marathi film Naav Motha Lakshan Khota. In 1979, he produced Ashtavinayak, directed by Rajdutt, which starred his son Sachin Pilgaonkar in the lead role. The film followed a Sangli family's pilgrimage to Maharashtra's eight sacred Ashtavinayak temples. Its music featured classical vocalist Vasantrao Deshpande and Anuradha Paudwal. The film earned Sharad Pilgaonkar the Maharashtra State Film Award for Best Second Film, while Sachin won the Filmfare Award for Best Actor – Marathi.

He subsequently produced Choravar More (1980) and wrote the story for the Hindi film Khoon Ka Rishta (1981), and later produced the Marathi film Savvasher (1984).

In addition to his film career, Sharad Pilgaonkar managed a printing business in Mumbai.

== Personal life ==
Sharad Pilgaonkar was based in Mumbai. He is the father of Sachin Pilgaonkar (born 17 August 1957), one of Maharashtra's foremost actors and directors, known for films such as Ashtavinayak (1979), Geet Gaata Chal (1975), and Nadiya Ke Paar (1982).

After Sharad Pilgaonkar's death, several of his honorary awards were stolen by a domestic servant and sold as scrap metal. Sachin Pilgaonkar reported the theft to Santacruz Police in October 2019, and the accused was arrested and charged.

== Filmography ==
Year	Title	Language	Role	Notes
1969	Vichitra Kutumbam	Telugu	Story writer	
1977	Naav Motha Lakshan Khota	Marathi	Producer	
1978	Melu Kolupu	Telugu	Story writer	
1979	Ashtavinayak	Marathi	Producer	Maharashtra State Film Award for Best Second Film
1980	Choravar More	Marathi	Producer	
1981	Khoon Ka Rishta	Hindi	Story writer	
1984	Savvasher	Marathi	Producer	
