= Shankar Babaji Patil =

- Occupation: Screenplay writer
- Known for: Pinjara (1972)
- Notable work: Pinjara (1972), Ek Gaon Bara Bhangadi (1968)

Shankar Babaji Patil was an Indian screenwriter and author. He worked in Marathi film industry.

He was alumni of colleges of Gadhinglaj and Kolhapur from where he did B.A and B.T. respectively.

He served for some time as a member of Maharashtra state government's committee on high school textbooks and curricula research.

Patil presided over Akhil Bharatiya Marathi Sahitya Sammelan at Nanded in 1985.

== Literary works ==
=== Collections of short stories ===
- Valiv (1958)
- Bhetigati (1960)
- Abhal (1961)
- Dhind (1962)
- Uen (1963)
- Vavri sheng (1963)
- Kulyanchi chavdi (1964)
- Kandoba (1974)
- Meeting
- Khush Kharedi (1984)
- Paijj
- Pavulvata
- Patalachi chinch

=== Novel ===
- Tarfula

=== Movie scripts ===
- Vadal vat
- Yuge yuge mi vat pahili
- Gangolan
- Bholi Bhabadi
- Pahuni
- Pinjara (1972)
- Bhujang
- Ek gaon bara bhangadi
- Ashich ek Ratra hoti

== Adaptation ==
Shankar Patil's short story Meeting was adapted by Dr. Priyadarshan Manohar as a short play named Meeting. On May 2, 2015, Kansas-based The Big Bang Theater performed the play at Regnier Hall Auditorium at KU Edwards Campus. The play was directed by Dr. Udayan Apte.
