= Maharashtra State Film Award for Best Music Director =

Indian film award

Maharashtra State Film Awards for Best Music Director
- Awarded for: Best Music Director
- Country: India
- Presented by: Government of Maharashtra
- Reward: ₹50,000
- First award: Sudhir Phadke, Prapanch (1962)

The Maharashtra State Film Award for Best Music Director is an honour established in 1962, and presented at the Maharashtra State Film Awards for best music director in Marathi cinema. The inaugural award was named as "Arun Paudwal Award for Best Music Direction" and was awarded to Sudhir Phadke for the film Prapanch, directed by Madhukar Pathak.

The first recipient of the award was Sudhir Phadke who was honoured for his composition for Prapanch in 1962. Anand Modak is the most frequent winner having won six awards. Sudhir Phadke has won it five times. Ram Kadam and Ajay-Atul have won it four times. Datta Davjekar, Ashok Patki, and Amitraj have won the award thrice each.

== Winners ==
Year	Recipient	Film	Ref
1962	Sudhir Phadke	Prapanch	
1963	Datta Davjekar	Rangalya Ratri Asha	
1963	Vasant Pawar	Rangalya Ratri Asha	
1963	Chhota Gandharva	Rangalya Ratri Asha	
1963	Datta Davjekar	Rangalya Ratri Asha	
1964	Datta Davjekar	Pathlaag	
1965	Vasant Pawar	Sawaal Majha Aika!	
1966	Anandghan	Sadhi Mansa	
1967	Datta Davjekar	Santh Wahate Krushnamai	
1968	Sudhir Phadke	Aamhi Jato Amuchya Gava	
1969	Datta Naik	Aparadh	
1970	Datta Davjekar	Dhartichi Lekara	
1971	C. Ramchandra	Gharkul	
1972	Ram Kadam	Ekta Jeev Sadashiv	
1974	Ram Kadam	Sugandhi Katta	
1975	Vasant Desai	Bayanno Navre Sambhala	
1976	Hridaynath Mangeshkar	Ha Khel Sawalyancha	
1977	Datta Naik	Bala Gau Kashi Angai	
1978	Hridaynath Mangeshkar	Jait Re Jait	
1979	Hridaynath Mangeshkar	Janaki	
1980	Ram Kadam	Paij	
1981	Vishwanath More	Gondhalat Gondhal	
1982	Bhaskar Chandavarkar	Ek Daav Bhutacha	
1983	Vishwanath More	Sansar Pakhrancha	
1984	Hridaynath Mangeshkar	Mahananda	
1985	Ashok Patki	Ardhangi	
1986	Anil-Arun	Aaj Zale Mukta Mee	
1987	Arun Paudwal	Gammat Jammat	
1988	Vishwanath More	Bandiwan Mi Ya Sansari	
1989	Anand Modak	Kalat Nakalat	
1990	Bhaskar Chandavarkar	Aaghat	
1991	Arvind Powar	Kal Ratri Bara Vajta	
1992	Ashok Patki	Aapli Mansa	
1993	Ram Kadam	Sai Baba	
1994	Anand Modak	Mukta	
1995	Anand Modak	Doghi	
1996	Anand Modak	Rao Saheb	
1997	Achyut Thakur	Paij Lagnachi	
1998	Suresh Wadkar	Ashi Dnyaneshwari	
1999	Achyut Thakur	Ghe Bharari	
2000	Anand Modak	Raju	
2001	Arvind-Nirmal	Ek Hoti Vadi	
2002	Shrirang Umrani	Dahavi Fa	
2003	Saleel Kulkarni	Vitthal Vitthal	
2004	Rishiraj	Me Tujhi Tujhech Re	
2005	Aashish Rego and K.C Loy	Pak Pak Pakaak	
2006	Ashok Patki	Savlee	
2007	Ajay-Atul	Tujhya Majhya Sansarala Ani Kay Hava	
2008	Shrirang Umrani	Gho Mala Asla Hava	
2009	Ajay-Atul	Natarang	
2010	Anand Modak	Dhoosar	
2011	Narendra Bhide	Paulwat	
2012	Kaushal Inamdar	Ajintha	
2013	Atul Lohar	Pikuli	
2014	Parikshit Bhatkhande	Dhangarwada	
2015	Shankar–Ehsaan–Loy	Katyar Kaljat Ghusali	
2016	Amitraj	Dashakriya	
2017	Vijay Narayan Gavande	Redu	
2018	Rajesh Sarkate	Menaka Urvashi	
2019	Amitraj	Hirkani	
2020	Rahul Deshpande	Me Vasantrao	
2021	Amitraj	Jhimma	
2022	Nihar Shembekar	Samaira	
2023	Ajay-Atul	Maharashtra Shahir	
2024	Akshay Khot	Kurla To Vengurla	

== Multiple wins ==
Individuals with two or more Best Music director awards:

Wins	Recipients
6	Anand Modak
4	Ram Kadam; Hridaynath Mangeshkar; Datta Davjekar
3	Ajay-Atul; Ashok Patki; Amitraj; Vishwanath More
2	Sudhir Phadke; Vasant Pawar; Datta Naik; Bhaskar Chandavarkar; Arun Paudwal; Shrirang Umrani; Achyut Thakur
