= Satish Alekar =

Indian Marathi playwright, actor and theatre director (born 1949)

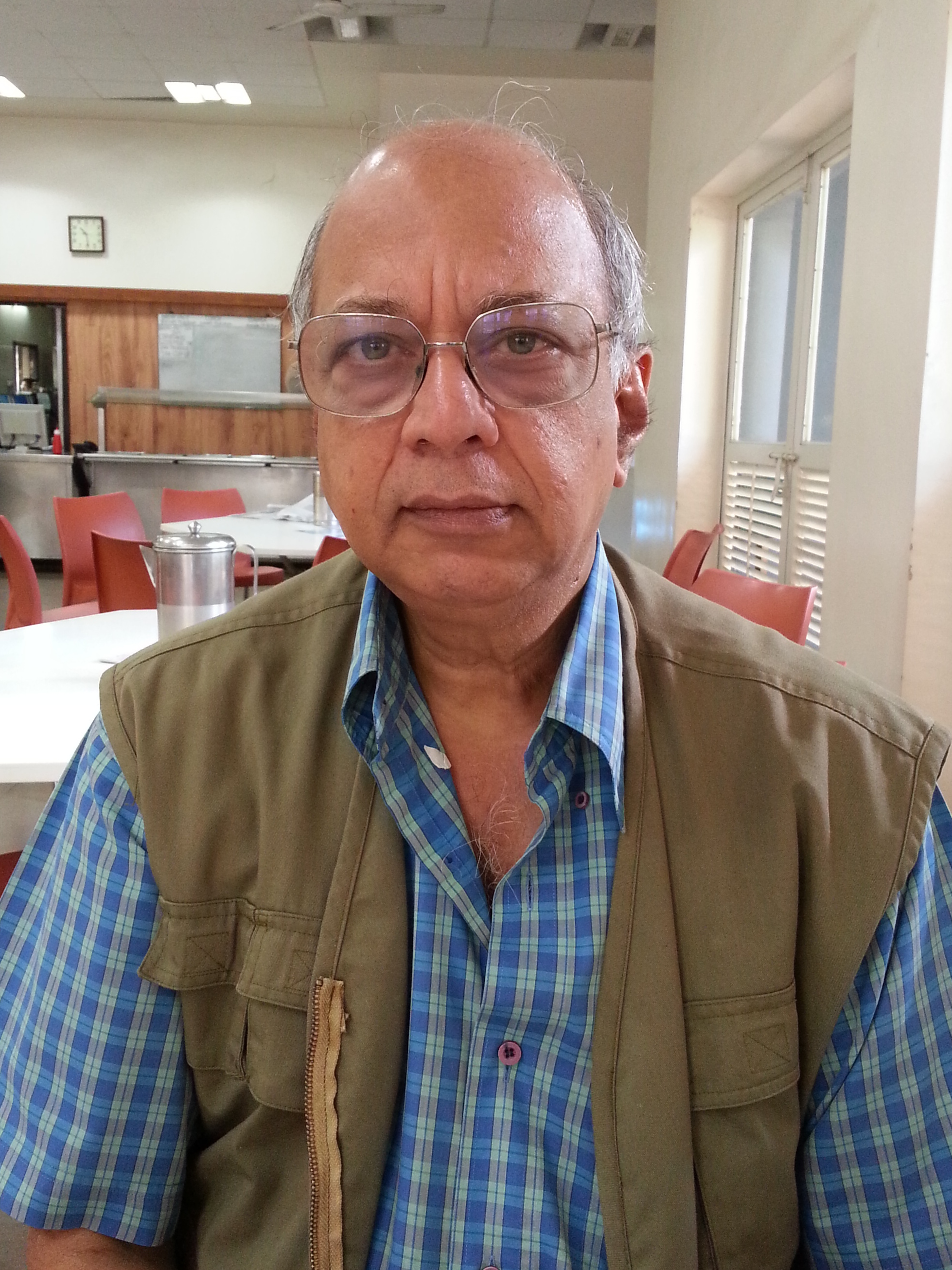
- Alekar at IUCAA canteen 'Ballava' in Pune, India
- Born: 30 January 1949 (age 77); Delhi, India
- Occupations: Playwright, stage actor, director, teacher
- Years active: 1971–present
- Known for: Jait Re Jait
- Awards: Sangeet Natak Akademi Award
- Honours: Padma Shri (2012)

Satish Vasant Alekar (born 30 January 1949) is an Indian Marathi playwright, actor, theatre director and professor. A founder member of the Theatre Academy, Pune, he is best known for his plays Mickey ani Memsahib (1973), Mahanirvan (1974), Mahapoor (1975), Begum Barve (1979), Atirekee (1990), Pidhijat (2003), Ek Divas Mathakade (2012), and Thakishi Samvad (2024). Along with Mahesh Elkunchwar and Vijay Tendulkar, he is considered among the most influential and progressive playwrights in modern Marathi theatre and Indian theatre.

He founded and headed the Centre for Performing Arts at the University of Pune from 1996 to 2009 after declining the directorship of the National School of Drama. He has also served as an adjunct professor at Duke University (1994); the Tisch School of the Arts, New York University, as a Fulbright Scholar (2003), and the Department of Theatre and Film Studies at the University of Georgia.

Alekar received the Sangeet Natak Akademi Award for Playwriting (Marathi) in 1994 from the Sangeet Natak Akademi, India's National Academy of Music, Dance and Drama. He was awarded the Padma Shri in 2012. Following his retirement, he served as Distinguished Professor at Savitribai Phule Pune University from 2013 to September 2022 and continues as a visiting faculty member at the university and the National School of Drama in Delhi. He has also appeared in Marathi and Hindi films, including Ventilator (2016).

== Early life and education ==
Alekar was born in Delhi, India. He but grew up in Pune, Maharashtra in a Marathi Brahmin family. He attended the Marathi-medium school New English School, Ramanbag, which was established by Lokmanya Bal Gangadhar Tilak. After high school, he attended Fergusson College for his undergraduate BSc degree in sciences. He received his master's degree in biochemistry from the University of Pune in 1972.

== Career ==
=== Theatre ===
Alekar gained his first stage experience as an actor in a college play. Impressed by his performance, director Bhalba Kelkar, who had set up the Progressive Dramatic Association, invited him to join it. Alekar wrote and directed his first one-act play Jhulta Pool in 1969. He became a part of a young circle that Jabbar Patel had started within the Progressive Dramatic Association. This group split with the parent body in 1973 and set up Theater Academy in Pune. The split was over Vijay Tendulkar's play Ghashiram Kotwal. The senior members decided against its premiere in 1972, and Patel's group decided to produce it under the auspices of its own Theater Academy. Alekar assisted Patel in the direction of Ghashiram Kotwal, and the group has since mounted over 35 plays by him and manage to establish its foothold in experimental Marathi theatre. Alekar conceived of and implemented Playwrights Development Scheme and Regional Theater Group Development. The Ford Foundation for Theater Academy, Pune supported these programs from 1985 to 1994. Alekar has collaborated in several international play translation projects. The Tisch School of Arts at New York University invited him in 2003 to teach a course on Indian Theatre. The Department of Theater and Films Studies, University of Georgia invited him in 2005 to direct an English production of his play Begum Barve. The Holy Cow Performing Arts Group in Edinburgh, Scotland performed an English version of Alekar's Micky and Memsahib on 27 and 28 August 2009 at Riddle's Court at the Edinburgh Fringe Festival.

=== Other employment ===
After obtaining his master's degree, Alekar worked as a research officer in biochemistry at the government-run B. J. Medical College, Pune. From July 1996 to January 2009, he worked as a professor and the head of the Center for Performing Arts (Lalit Kala Kendra) at University of Pune. He was working as the honorary director for a program supported by Ratan Tata Trust at the University of Pune from 2009 to 2011. From 2013 to 2022 he was nominated by University of Pune as distinguished professor on the campus.

=== Plays ===
==== Original Marathi plays written since 1973 ====
- Micki Aani Memsaheb मिकी आणि मेमसाहेब (1973)*
- Mahanirvan महानिर्वाण (1974)* Completed 50 years of run by Theatre Academy, Pune (1974-2011) and currently by Natak Company, Pune since 2018-
- Mahapoor महापूर (1975) The play revived in 2025 by Wide-wings Media to mark to 50th year of the play
- Begum Barve बेगम बर्वे (1979)*
- Shanwar Raviwar शनवार रविवार (1982)*
- Dusra Samana दुसरा सामना (1987)
- Atireki अतिरेकी (1990)*
- Pidhijat पिढीजात (2003)*
- Ek Divas Mathakade एक दिवस मठाकडे (2012)
- Thakishi Sanvad ठकीशी संवाद (2020), written during COVID-19 lockdown (March–July 2020), produced by Rakhdi Studio, Pune in 2024.completed more than 50 shows till now.
- Mahapoor (1975), dir. Mohan Gokhale for Theatre Academy, Pune
- Dusra Samna (1987), dir. Waman Kendre for Kala Vaibhav, Mumbai
- Ek Divas Mathakade (2012), dir. Nipun Dharmadhikari for Natak Company, Pune
- Plays directed by Alekar for Theatre Academy, Pune

===== Original Marathi one-act plays =====
- Memory मेमरी (1969)
- Bhajan भजन (1969)
- Ek Zulta Pool एक झुलता पूल (1971)
- Dar Koni Ughadat Naahi दर कोणी उघडत नाही (1979)
- Bus Stop बस स्टॅाप (1980)

===== Adapted/translated one-act plays and plays =====
- Judge जज्ज (1968)
- Yamuche Rahasya यमुचे रहस्य (1976)
- Bhint भिंत (1980)
- Valan वळण (1980)
- Pralay प्रलय (1985), Marathi version of Gunther Grass's German play The Flood
- Alshi Uttarvalyachi Gosht आळशी अत्तरवाल्याची गोष्ट (1999)
- Nashibvan Baiche Don नशीबवान बाईचे दोन (1999)
- Supari सुपारी (2002)
- Karmaachari कर्मचारी (2009)

Alekar started writing at the age of 19 as a chemistry graduation, though most of his early works were short plays. Many of his plays are set around Pune Brahmin society, highlighting their narrow mindedness and subsequently he ventured into small-town politics with Doosra Samna (1989). Mahanirvan (1973) (The Dread Departure) finds black humour through Hindu death rites in Brahmins and its overt seriousness is today Alekar's best-known early work and has since been performed in Bengali, Hindi, Dongri, Konkani and Gujarati. It was originally a one-act play and he had later expanded it at Patel's insistence. It was first staged on 22 November 1974 at the Bharat Natya Mandir, by the Theatre Academy, Pune and was revived in 1999 for its 25th anniversary, and was performed at the same venue, with most of the original cast intact. Mickey Ani Memsaheb (1974) was his first full-length script. With the exception of his Mahapoor (1975), he directed all of his own plays. Alekar's Begum Barve (1979) is regarded as a classic of contemporary Marathi theatre. It deals with the eponymous female impersonator's memories and fantasies. After his musical company closed down, a minor singer-actor starts selling incense sticks on the street and gets exploited by his employer. One day his fantasies get enmeshed with those of a pair of clerks who were his regular customers, and those fantasies get almost fulfilled. The play staged in Rajasthani, Punjabi, Gujarati, Bengali, Konkani, Tamil and Kannada. In 2009, 30 years after its first production, the play returned to Mumbai with its original cast of Chandrakant Kale, and Mohan Aghashe. Alekar's other plays are Bhajan, Bhinta, Walan, Shanivar-Ravivar (1982), Dusra Samna (1987), and Atireki (1990). The first three are one-act plays. Atireki is marked by irony, wit, and tangential take-offs from absurd premises. In January 2011 a book of short plays translated/adapted into Marathi by Satish Alekar published by M/s Neelkanth Prakashan, Pune under the title "Adharit Ekankika". In 2022, all of Alekar's plays, including short plays in Marathi, were published as a new edition by the Popular Prakashan, Mumbai.

=== Acting reading performance ===
Aparichit Pu La (अपरिचित पु.लं.) (2018) was a 90 minute acting reading programme on the lesser-known writings of the writer, performer P. L. Deshpande पु.ल.देशपांडे (1919–2000) produced by Shabda Vedh, Pune (शब्द वेध,पुणे) to mark the birth centenary of the writer, and conceived by Chandrakant Kale. The cast included Satish Alekar, Chandrakant Kale and Girish Kulkarni. The first show was performed in Pulotsav on 22 November 2018 at Balgamdharva Ranga Mandir, Pune. Performances were also staged in Pune, Solapur, Ratnagiri and Mumbai.

=== Film scripts ===
Alekar scripted the National Film Award, winning Marathi feature film Jait Re Jait in 1977, directed by Jabbar Patel. Later he directed the 13-part Hindi TV serial Dekho Magar Pyarse for Doordarshan in 1985. He scripted the dialogues for the Marathi feature film Katha Don Ganpatravanchi in 1995–96.

=== Writing for Marathi newspaper ===
Alekar wrote a fortnightly column in Marathi for the Sunday edition of Loksatta Gaganika from January to December 2015. The column was based on his career in the performing Arts since 1965. The column was popular, and the book Gaganika, based on the column, was published on 30 April 2017 by M/s Rajahans Prakashan, Pune.

== Awards and recognition ==
Some of Alekar's plays have been translated and produced in Hindi, Bengali, Tamil, Dogri, Gujarati, Rajasthani, Punjabi, and Konkani. His plays have been included in the National Anthologies published in 2000–01 by the National School of Drama and Sahitya Akademi, Delhi. Alekar is the recipient of several national and state awards for his contribution to the field of Theater and Literature.

- In 1974 his collection of short plays Zulta Pool (झुलता पूल) received best collection of short plays award from Ministry of Culture, Govt. of Maharashtra.
- In 1975 he received Late Ram Ganesh Gadkari award from the State of Maharashtra for his play Mahanirvan (महानिर्वाण).
- He received Nandikar Sanman at Kolkata in 1992.
- He received fellowships from the Asian Cultural Council, New York in 1983 to study theatre in the US, and from the Ford Foundation to study Theatre of South Asia in 1988.
- He received in 1994 a Sangeet Natak Akademi Award for playwriting from Sangeet Natak Akademi, Delhi (संगीत नाटक अकादमी, दिल्ली).
- Received State Award Best Actor in Comedy Role for the Marathi film Katha Don Ganpatravanchi (कथा दोन गणपतरावांची), dir. Arun Khopkar (1997)
- Received Vi Va Shirwadkar award (Poet Kusumagraj) for playwriting by Natya Parishad, Nasik in 2007
- Received Lifetime Achievement felicitation (जीवन गौरव) by Akhil Bharatiya Marathi Natya Parishad, Mumbai in Feb 2012
- He received the award Padma Shri (पद्मश्री) conferred by the President of India in January 2012.
- In December 2013 Alekar received the Balaraj Sahani Memorial Award (बलराज सहानी स्मृती पुरस्कार) in Pune for his contribution over last 40 years as a playwright, director and actor.
- In 2014 he was awarded Poet and Playwright Aarati Prabhu Award (कवि आरती प्रभू) by Baba Vardam Theatres, Kudal, Sindhudurg district.
- 2017 Tanveer Sanman (तन्वीर सन्मान) national award for the lifetime contribution to the field of Theatre constituted by veteran actor Dr. Shriram Lagoo through Rupavedh Pratisthan, Pune. Award function was held in Pune on 9 December 2017.
- 2018 book Gaganika (गगनिका) received Advt Tryambakrao Shirole award for best non fiction (उत्कृष्ट ललित गद्य) by Maharashtra Sahitya Parishad, Pune
- 2022 Natavarya Prabhakar Panshikar Jeevan Gaurav Puraskar for the year 2021-22 by the Government of Maharashtra highest Cultural Life Achievement Award.
- 2022 Vishnudas Bhave Medal award by Natyavidyamandir Samitee, Sangli
- 2023 Thespo Life Achievement Award at the hands of Utkarsh Mujumdar in the presence of Naseeruddin Shah, Ratna Pathak Shah and Atul Kuma during Thespo@25 Theatre Fest in Mumbai on December 10, 2023
- 2024 Kantai Jeevan Gourav Award (Life Achievement Award) for 2023 by Bhavarlal Jain Foundation, Jalgaon at a ceremony held on January 16, 2024 in Jalgaon
- 2024 Bhavanrao Lomte Smruti Rajya Puraskar 2024, Ambajogai at a function held in Ambejogai by Yeshvantrao Chavan Smruti Samiti, Ambejogai on September 21
- 2025 Janasthan Puraskar by Kusumagraj Pratisthan, Nashik at a function in Nashik on March 10, 2025.
- 2025 Pune Festival Award for the contribution to theatre in September.
- 2025 The Goa Hindu Association - Dr Subhash Bhede supported Late Shashikant Narvekar award for best play of the year “Thakishi Samvad”.

Natakkar Satish Alekar (Playwright Satish Alekar), a 90-minute film by Atul Pethe about Alekar's life, and work was released in 2008.

== Personal life ==
Alekar belongs to City of Pune. His parents, the late Usha and Vasant Alekar were freedom fighters, both involved in India's 1942 movement. Alekar married Anita (Abhyankar) in 1976. They have a son. Anita died in 2007. He has one younger brother Sudhir and one sister Bharati. Presently he is living in Pune with his son.

== Filmography ==
=== Hindi films ===
- Ye Kahani Nahi (1984), dir. Biplav Rai Chowdhary
- Devi Ahilya (2002), dir. Nachiket Patwardhan
- Dumkata (2007)
- Aiyyaa (2012)
- Dekh Tamasha Desk (2014), dir. Feroz Abbas Khan
- Thackeray, (2019) as Jayprakash Narayan
- 83 (2021), as S. K. Wankhede
- The Suspect (2022) as Dayanand Bharadvaj, Police Commissioner, dir. Samir Karnik, Maverick Pictures, Mumbai

=== Marathi films/web series ===
- Aakrit (1981), dir. Amol Palekar
- Umbartha (1982)
- Dhyaas Parva (2001)
- Dr. Babasaheb Ambedkar (2000)
- Ek Hota Vidushak (1992)
- Katha Don Ganpatravaanchee (1996)
- Kadachit (2007)
- Chintoo (2012), as Colonel Kaka
- Chintoo 2: Khajinyachi Chittarkatha (2013), as Colonel Kaka
- Hovoon Jaudyaa- We Are On! (2013), dir. Amol Palekar
- Mhais (2013), dir. Shekhar Naik
- Aajachaa Diwas Maazaa (2013), dir. Chandrakant Kulkarni
- Yashwantrao Chavan: Bakhar Eka Vaadalaachi (2014)
- Deool Band (2015)
- Welcome Zindagi (2015)
- High Way-Ek Selfie Aar Paar (2015), dir. Umesh Kulkarni
- Rajwade and Sons (2015) as Rajwade
- Jaundya Na Balasaheb! (2016)
- Ventilator (2016) as Bhau
- Chi Va Chi Sau Ka (2017) as Bhudargadkar
- Mala Kahich Problem Naahi (2017)
- Mee Shivaji Park (2017) as Satish Joshi
- Bhai: Vyakti Ki Valli (2018) as Ramakant Deshpande
- Bhai: Vyakti Ki Valli 2 (2018) as Ramakant Deshpande
- Smile Please (2019) as Appa Joshi
- Panchak (2023) as Bal Kaka
- Pet Puraan (2021) as Lt. Col. Jarasandh Wagh (Ret'd.), (web series)
- Ek Don Teen Chaar (2024) as Dr. Vivek Joshi
- Kalsutra- कालसूत्र (2022), as Shriram Bidari, (web series)

=== plays ===
- 1971: as young man in short play Ek Zulta Poolv, directed by himself
- 1974: as the son "Nana" in play Mahanirvanvm directed by himself for Theatre Academy, Pune in more than 100 shows
- 1979: as Javadekar in play Begum Barve, directed by himself for Theatre Academy, Pune
- 1982: short play Boat Futli, directed by Samar Nakhate for Theatre Academy, Pune
- 1980: as husband in Shanwar Raviwar, directed by himself for Theatre Academy, Pune

=== TV and short films ===
Products:

- TV Cable Co.: Tata Sky (2010)
- Car: Honda Ameze (2013) for Appostophe, Mumbai
- Cell Phone Company: Idea - Telephone Exchange (2013) for Chrome Pictures, Mumbai
- New York Life Insurance (2012)
- Online Purchase: SNAPDEAL (2016) for Chrome Pictures, Mumbai
- Fiama Di Willis Body Wash (2018) for Apostrophe Films, Mumbai, dir. Kaushik Sarkar
- Reunion Episode 3 Language: Marathi (2018), pickle brand presented by Ravetkar Group, Pune Dir Varun Narvekar (short film)
- maateech swapna मातीचं स्वप्न (2018), short film in Marathi for Chitale Bandhu Mithaiwale (चितळे बंधू), produced by Multimedia Tools, Pune, dir. Varun Narvekar
- Reunion for Ravetkar Group (2018): three minute short film made about the awareness for early treatment of brain stroke made by Ruby Hall Clinic, Pune
- रुची पालट/Fusion Food/ Chitale Bandhoo (2019): for Chitale Bandhoo, Pune
- Cotten King Brand- Just Stretch Your Limits (2020), dir. Varun Narvekar
- Red Label Tea (2021) ad film for Hindustan Unilever, dir. Gajraj Rao for Code Red Films, Mumbai
- Short film "Fala" (फळा - तिमिरातून तेजाकडे 2021), produced by Kc Productions, dir. Mangesh Jagtap
- Short film "Ravivar Sakal" - 2024 (रविवार सकाळ) 30 minutes, Aadi Nirrmite, dir. Bansidhar Kinkar, cast - Satish Alekar, Gauri Deshpande and Aroh Velankar
- Short film "Dada aani Sakharam" 2024 (दादा आणि सखाराम), dir. Yogesh Deshpande, produced by Roadlife
- Chaha, Bakarwadi aani To चहा, बाकरवडी आणि तो (2024), Chitale Bandhu brand film, dir. Varun Narvekar

. Axis Bank NRI ad Competition Films ( 2026)

. Swaniketan short film for special children home ( 2026) dir. Varun Narvekar for Paranjpe Builders, Pune

.
