= Meena Prabhu =

Indian writer (1939–2025)

Meena Sudhakar Prabhu (27 August 1939, in Pune – 1 March 2025, in Pune) was an Indian writer and former anaesthesiologist, best remembered for her travelogues in Marathi of the United Kingdom, Iran, Egypt, China, Turkey, and Mexico. A graduate of B. J. Medical College in Mumbai, she was the recipient of a D. B. Mokashi Award in 2010, a G. N. Dandekar Memorial Mrunmayi Award in 2011, an N. C. Kelkar Award in 2012, and a Maharashtra Bhushan in 2023. She pursued a career in medicine and completed her MBBS from B. J. Medical College in Pune, followed by further postgraduate medical training in Mumbai and later in London. After marriage, she settled in the United Kingdom, where she worked for nearly two decades as an anaesthesiologist and general medical practitioner. Despite her demanding medical profession, her passion for writing and travel continued to grow, and she began documenting her international journeys in Marathi, a language in which travel literature was still developing as a mainstream genre. Her first major travelogue, "Maza London," gained wide popularity and established her as a fresh and engaging literary voice. Over the years, she travelled extensively across Europe, Asia, the Middle East, and the Americas, transforming her experiences into well-researched, lively, and accessible books that combined history, geography, culture, and personal observation. Some of her best-known works include Egyptayan, Turkanama, Greekanjali, Chini Maati, Meksikoparva, Gatha Irani, Romrajya (Parts 1 and 2), Vaat Tibetchi, and New York-New York. Her writing style was appreciated for its clarity, emotional warmth, descriptive strength, and ability to make distant cultures relatable to Marathi readers. Beyond writing, she actively participated in literary organizations and cultural forums, served in leadership roles such as presiding over women’s literary conferences, and worked to promote reading and knowledge. In 2017, she founded the Prabhu Gyanmandir initiative in Pune, which aimed to create a modern, technology-enabled reading space for the public. Her contribution to literature earned her several prestigious awards, including the D. B. Mokashi Award, G. N. Dandekar Memorial Mrunmayi Award, N. C. Kelkar Award, multiple Maharashtra State Literature Awards, and a lifetime achievement honor from Maharashtra Sahitya Parishad in 2023. Meena Prabhu continued writing and engaging with readers well into her later years. She died on 1 March 2025 in Pune at the age of 85, leaving behind a rich literary legacy. She is remembered as a pioneer who helped popularize travel writing in Marathi and as a rare personality who successfully bridged two demanding professions—medicine and literature—while inspiring generations of readers to explore the world through both travel and books.
