= Ravindra Sathe =

Indian playback singer (born 1951)

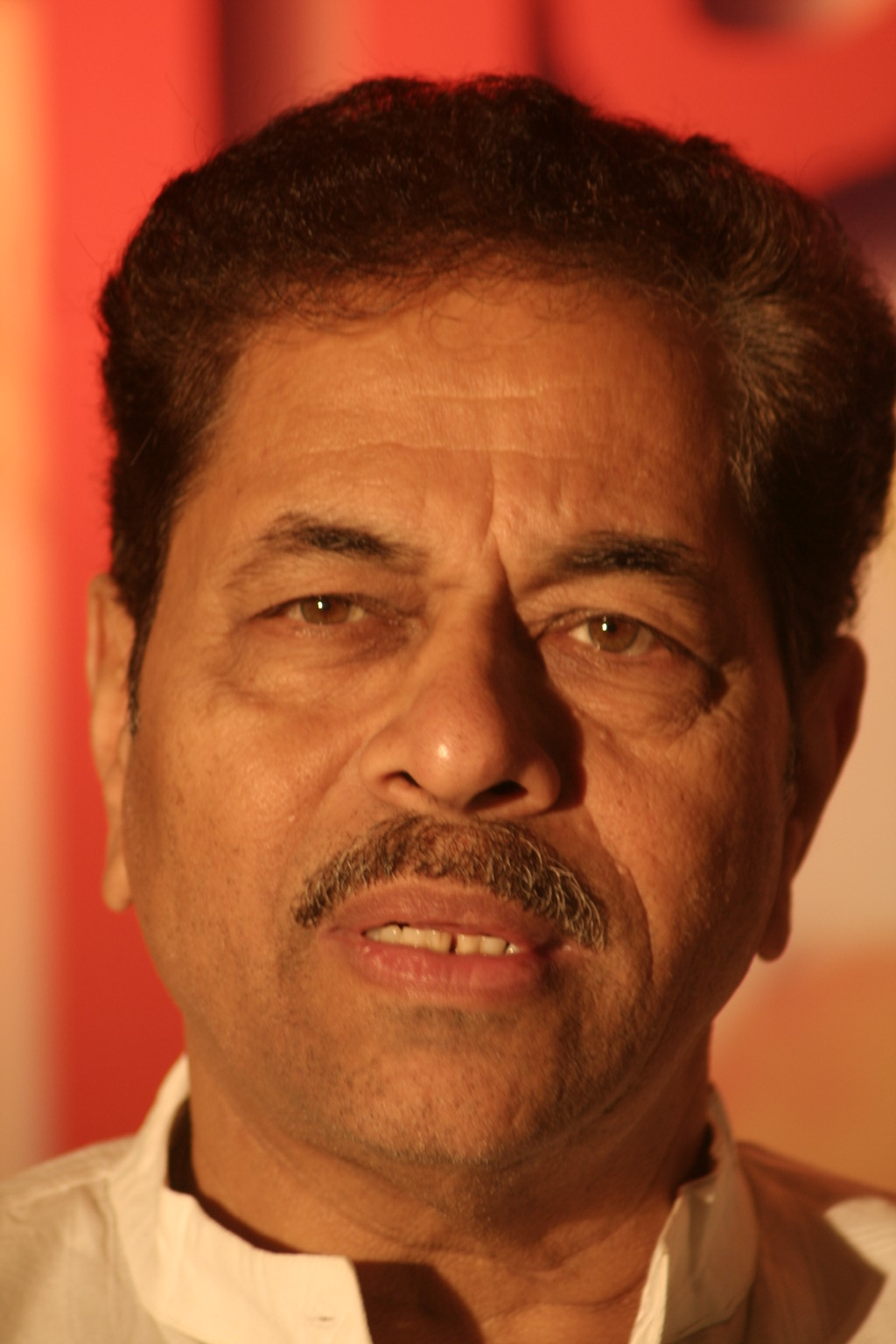

Background information
- Born: Ravindra Sathe; 7 February 1951 (age 74)
- Genres: playback singing
- Occupation: Singer
- Instrument: Vocalist
- Years active: 1972–present

Ravindra Sathe (born 7 February 1951) is an Indian playback singer in Marathi film industry. He was the original cast and crew member of famous Marathi theatre play Ghashiram Kotwal. He had been awarded Maharashtra State Film Award for Best Male Playback Singer 10 times.

== Early life ==
Sathe was born on 7 February 1951 in Pune, India, into a family of music lovers. His father was a radio announcer and harmonium player. Sathe's mother, Shakuntala, was a homemaker. At the age of eight, Sathe began singing Sudhir Phadke's songs with remarkable accuracy.

Sathe completed his primary education in Pune and later graduated from Fergusson College. He then enrolled in the Film and Television Institute of India (FTII) to study sound recording and engineering.

== Career ==
He started his career as sound recordist in Doordarshan. He has many performances of light music all over India. These include "Nakshtranche Dene", Diwali pahat etc. He began his career in music at a young age, singing on All India Radio. He won the first prize in the Sugam Sangeet competition organized by Rotaract. He then trained in classical music under Pandit Nagesh Khadilkar.

Sathe made his debut in the Marathi film industry with the 1974 film Samna, singing the iconic song "Kunachya Khandyavar Kunache Ozhe." He went on to sing in numerous Marathi and Hindi films, working with renowned music directors such as Gajanan Watave, Madhukar Golwalkar, C. Ramchandra, Datta Davjekar, Hridaynath Mangeshkar, Anand Modak and Ashok Patki.

Sathe has released several devotional albums, including "Gaganee Ugawala Sayantara," "Mohuniya Tuj Sang," and "Mi Niranjantil Vat." He has also sung in various languages, including Gujarati, Odia, Haryanvi, and Assamese.

== Discography ==
Year	Film	Songs	Composer	Co-artist
1974	Samna	"Kunachya Khandyavar Kunache Ozhe"	Bhaskar Chandavarkar	Solo
1974	Samna	"Ya Topikhali Dadlay Kay"	Bhaskar Chandavarkar	Shriram Lagoo
1975	Bhakta Pundalik	"Pundalika Bheti Parbrahma Aale"	Bhaskar Chandavarkar	Solo
1975	Bhakta Pundalik	"Nakos Jagane"	Bhaskar Chandavarkar	Usha Mangeshkar
1976	Aaram Haram Aahe	"Aaram Haram Aahe"	Sudhir Phadke	Asha Bhosle
1977	Jait Re Jait	"Jambhul Piklya Zaadakhali"	Hridaynath Mangeshkar	Asha Bhosle
1977	Jait Re Jait	"Lingobacha Dongur"	Hridaynath Mangeshkar	Chandrakant Kale
1977	Jait Re Jait	"Dongar Kathadi Thakarwadi"	Hridaynath Mangeshkar	Chandrakant Kale
1977	Jait Re Jait	"Aamhi Thakar Thakar"	Hridaynath Mangeshkar	Chandrakant Kale
1977	Jait Re Jait	"Pik Karpala"	Hridaynath Mangeshkar	Solo
1977	Jait Re Jait	"Mee Raat Taakali"	Hridaynath Mangeshkar	Lata Mangeshkar
1977	Jait Re Jait	"Gorya Dehavarti"	Hridaynath Mangeshkar	Usha Mangeshkar
1979	Aaitya Bilavar Nagoba	"Aaitya Bilavar Nagoba"	Ram Kadam	Suresh Wadkar, Uttara Kelkar
1979	Aaitya Bilavar Nagoba	"Jeevacha Maitar"	Ram Kadam	Suresh Wadkar
1979	Duniya Kari Salam	"Duniya Kari Salam"	Ram Kadam	Suresh Wadkar, Abhay Patwardhan
1979	Duniya Kari Salam	"Dev Jagavegla"	Ram Kadam	Suresh Wadkar, Ranjana Joglekar
1981	Akriet	"Divas Ugavuni Kiti Var Aala"	Bhaskar Chandavarkar	Solo
1982	Umbartha	"Ganjalya Othans Majhya"	Hridaynath Mangeshkar	Solo
1986	Aaj Jhale Mukt Mi	"Humba Humba"	Anil-Arun	Solo
1987	Porichi Dhamaal Baapachi Kamaal	"Yeshil Yeshil Rani"	Yashwant Dev	Uttara Kelkar
1988	Rangat Sangat	"Happy Birthday"	Ashok Patki	Sudesh Bhosale, Vinay Mandke
1988	Rangat Sangat	"Zindagiche Swair Gane Gauya"	Ashok Patki	Sudesh Bhosale, Vinay Mandke
1989	Hamaal De Dhamaal	"Manmohana Tu Raja Swapnatala"	Anil Mohile	Asha Bhosle
1989	Kalat Nakalat	"He Ek Reshmi Gharte"	Anand Modak	Anuradha Paudwal
1991	Shame To Shame	"He Mumbai Bhaltich Danger"	Anil Mohile	Vijay Mandke
1991	Bandhan	"Naravina Naricha"	Anil Mohile	Solo
1991	Bandhan	"Radu Nako"	Anil Mohile	Solo
1991	Pashchatap	"Survya Ala Ho Ala"	Madhu Krishna	Solo
1991	Chaukat Raja	"He Jeevan Sundar Aahe"	Anand Modak	Asha Bhosle, Anjali Marathe
1992	Ek Hota Vidushak	"Me Gaatana Geet Tula"	Anand Modak	Solo
1992	Ek Hota Vidushak	"Ujal Ujalalya"	Anand Modak	Jayshri Shivram
1992	Ek Hota Vidushak	"Radhe Yamunechya Kathavar Dorva"	Anand Modak	Devaki Pandit
1992	Ek Hota Vidushak	"Bhar Tarunyacha Mala"	Anand Modak	Asha Bhosle
1992	Ek Hota Vidushak	"Shabdancha Ha Khel Mandala"	Anand Modak	Chandrakant Kale, Mukund Fansalkar, Prabhanjan Marathe
1992	Ek Hota Vidushak	"Tarana"	Anand Modak	Devaki Pandit
1992	Ek Hota Vidushak	"Lal Paithani Rang Majhya"	Anand Modak	Devaki Pandit
1992	Ek Hota Vidushak	"Gadad Jambhal Bharla Aabhal"	Anand Modak	Arun Ingle, Uttara Kelkar
1992	Ek Hota Vidushak	"Kadi Varti Madi"	Anand Modak	Solo
1992	Ek Hota Vidushak	"Mothyansathi Khote Hasu"	Anand Modak	Solo
1993	Shivrayanchi Soon Tararani	"Samradnila Samar Kushalala"	Datta Davjekar	Solo
1994	Mukta	"Tya Maziya"	Anand Modak	Solo
1994	Mukta	"Valan Vatatala Ya"	Anand Modak	Solo
1995	Aboli	"Dongar Ghatatali Datali, Hirwi Zhadi"	Nishikant Sadaphule	Solo
1995	Aai	"Aai, Aai, Aai"	Anand Modak	Jayshri Shivram
1996	Rao Saheb	"Valnavar Bhetatat Kshan Saare"	Anand Modak	Solo
1997	Putravati	"Kadhi Kase Lagle Tujhe Pis"	Shridhar Phadke	Solo
1997	Yeshwant	"Jai Jai Jagdambe Kali"	Anand–Milind	Solo
1997	Yeshwant	"Kadaklaxmi Aali"	Anand–Milind	Solo
1997	Yeshwant	"Saanware Aai Jaiyo"	Anand–Milind	Solo
1998	Sarkarnama	"Zakolala Zakolala"	Anand Modak	Solo
1998	Tu Tithe Mee	"Shodhit Gaav Aalo"	Anand Modak	Solo
1998	Tu Tithe Mee	"Ujale Waat"	Anand Modak	Solo
1998	Tu Tithe Mee	"Jal Dahulale Bimb Harapale"	Anand Modak	Solo
1999	Ghe Bharari	"Phiru Nako Maghari Ghe Bharari"	Achyut Thakur	Solo
1999	Vaastav: The Reality	"Vaastav Theme" (both 1 & 2)	Rahul Ranade	Rahul Ranade
1999	Vaastav: The Reality	"Shendur Laal Chadhayo"	Jatin–Lalit	Solo
2000	Kurukshetra	"Yeh Tera Kurukshetra Hai"	Himesh Reshammiya	Solo
2001	Chimani Pakhar	"Maya Mandir Halale"	Achyut Thakur	Solo
2002	Hathyar: Face to Face with Reality	"Shlok"	Rahul Ranade	Solo
2004	Shegavicha Rana Gajanana	"Jay Gajanan"	Sanjay Geete	Solo
2004	Uttarayan	"Ran He Uthale Uthale"	Amartya Bobo Rahut	Solo
2004	Uttarayan	"Dhund Hote Shabd Saare"	Amartya Bobo Rahut	Solo

== Famous songs ==
- Kunachya khandyavar kunache oze ‘कुणाच्या खांद्यावर’
- Amhi Thakar Thakar 'आम्ही ठाकर ठाकर’
- Saanware Aai Jaiyo 'Yeshwant Movie'
- Marathi Abhimaangeet
- Ya dehi tuza sang 'या देही तुझा संग'
- Ran he uthale uthale रान हे उठले उठले
- Ganjalya Othas Mazya गंजल्या ओठास माझ्या (उंबरठा)

== Awards and recognition ==
- 1st Shahir Sable award by Maharashtra BJP
- V. Shantaram Special Contribution Award
- Ten Maharashtra State Film Awards for Best Playback Singer
- Nandur Madhymaharashtra Award
- Balgandharva Award from Akhil Bharatiya Natya Parishad
- Manik Verma Award from Swaranand
- Chaitrabhan Award from Gadima Pratishthan
- Shahir Sabale Award
