= Rangalya Ratri Asha =

1962 Indian film

- Directed by: Raja Thakur
- Screenplay by: Ranjit Desai
- Story by: Ranjit Desai
- Starring: Arun Sarnaik; Seema Deo
- Cinematography: Bal Korde
- Music by: Datta Davjekar, Vasant Pawar, Chhota Gandharva
- Production company: Maharashtra Film Industrial Cooperative Society Ltd.
- Release date: 29 May 1962
- Running time: 131 minutes
- Country: India
- Language: Marathi

Rangalya Ratri Asha (transl. Such Enchanting Nights) is a 1962 Indian Marathi-language musical & social film directed by Raja Thakur. The film stars Arun Sarnaik and Seema Deo. At the 10th National Film Awards, The film won National Film Award for Best Marathi Feature Film.

== Plot ==
The film opens with a performance by the tamasha troupe of Radhabai Budhgaonkar (Seema Deo). When a dancer is asked to perform a lavani, she agrees but asks where the dholki player is. Lakhya (Vasant Shinde) introduces Yashwant (Arun Sarnaik), who joins the performance on the dholki. His playing receives an enthusiastic response from the audience, establishing his popularity as a musician. Among those attending the performance is Nana (Shahu Modak), the actor and owner of the Rajvaibhav Natak Company. Impressed by Yashwant's musicianship, Nana invites him to join his theatre company. Yashwant accepts the offer. During a rehearsal, Nana remarks that he is unable to perform a song properly. Yashwant suggests changing the rhythm, which angers the company's veteran tabla player. Nana, however, asks Yashwant to accompany him, and the performance is successful. Yashwant also befriends the company's sarangi player, Dadumiyan (Sharad Talwalkar), and begins working as a tabla player.

Yashwant's arrival creates tension with the veteran tabla player, who leaves the company after feeling that his position is being undermined. The Rajvaibhav Natak Company subsequently tours different places and eventually arrives in Bombay, where Yashwant's performances receive considerable acclaim. During one visit to his village, he performs the dholki accompaniment for the lavani "Mala Ho Mhanatat Lavangi Mirchi" at Lakhya's insistence. Radha, his wife, tells him that she is expecting a child. Yashwant initially decides to stay with her, but Radha persuades him to return to the theatre company, assuring him that she will have her mother and Lakhya to look after her.

After returning to Bombay, Yashwant finds himself unable to sleep following a theatre performance. Dadumiyan invites him to a kothi to listen to music. Although Yashwant is initially reluctant, he eventually accompanies him. There, he becomes attracted to the kothawali (Minoo Mumtaz) and falls in love with her. He begins spending most of his time with her and gradually neglects both his family and his responsibilities to the theatre company. Even after receiving a telegram informing him that Radha has given birth to a daughter, he avoids returning to his village, citing work as an excuse. Nana, however, celebrates the birth by distributing sweets among the company members. As Yashwant's absence and neglect of his duties continue, Nana is informed of the situation. Yashwant eventually fails to appear for a scheduled performance and loses his position in the company.

Meanwhile, Nana also begins attending the kothawali's performances and develops a close relationship with her. Yashwant becomes jealous and objects to their association, but the kothawali firmly tells him that he has no right to exercise control over her. Unable to accept the situation, Yashwant turns to alcohol. Believing that he has lost his artistic ability, he becomes increasingly despondent and descends into alcoholism.

With Yashwant no longer accompanying the performances, Nana finds that the music no longer gives him the same satisfaction and decides to close the theatre company. He resolves to devote himself to the service of God, having already earned enough through his career. Meanwhile, Dadumiyan searches for Yashwant. One day, while passing near a railway bridge, he notices a crowd and discovers Yashwant lying there in a severely deteriorated and weakened condition.

The kothawali takes Yashwant in and cares for him. During his recovery, he asks Dadumiyan about Nana. Dadumiyan takes him to a temple, where Nana is singing the abhang "Patit Pavan Naam Aikuni". Nana gives Yashwant some words of advice and encourages him to return to his family. Yashwant agrees and prepares to leave. Nana then stops him and asks him to accompany him in the performance. He continues the abhang with the lines, "Patit Pavan Naam Aikuni Aalo Mi Daara, Patit Pavan Na Hosi Mhanuni Jaato Maghaara." Yashwant joins him on the tabla and performs with renewed confidence, realising that his musical ability is still intact.

The abhang continues in the background as Yashwant returns home. His daughter welcomes him and calls for her mother. Unable to find words to express themselves, Yashwant and Radha silently look at each other. Radha asks their daughter to call Lakhya, after which she and Yashwant embrace, marking their reconciliation.

== Cast ==
- Arun Sarnaik as Yashwant
- Seema Deo as Radha
- Minoo Mumtaz as Kothewali
- Shahu Modak as Nana
- Sharad Talwalkar as Dadumiyan
- Vasant Shinde as Lakhya
- Asha Patil
- Indira Chitnis

== Soundtrack ==
The songs of the film are composed by Datta Davjekar, Vasant Pawar and Chhota Gandharva with most of the lyrics by Jagdish Khebudkar and Alam Mirzapuri.

All lyrics are written by Jagdish Khebudkar & Alam Mirzapuri; all music is composed by Datta Davjekar, Vasant Pawar & Chhota Gandharva.

No.	Title	Singer(s)	Length
1.	"Tumcha Ni Majha Kadha Photo"	Asha Bhosle	02:50
2.	"Shura Me Vandile"	Chhota Gandharva	05:35
3.	"Rajani Nath Ha Nabhi Ugavla"	Chhota Gandharva	04:31
4.	"Mala O Mhantyat Lavangi Mirchi"	Sulochana Chavan	03:05
5.	"Naman Natwara"	Chhota Gandharva	01:36
6.	"Tere Vaade Bhi Sapne Dikhate Rahey"	Asha Bhosle	04:26
7.	"De Hata Ya Sharanagata"	Chhota Gandharva	07:00
8.	"Akele Hum To Ghabraye"	Asha Bhosle	03:32

== Awards ==
Year	Award	Category	Recipient(s)	Ref.
1963	10th National Film Awards	Best Marathi Feature Film	Raja Thakur	
1963	2nd Maharashtra State Film Awards	Best Film	Maharashyta Film Industry Cooperative Society	
1963	2nd Maharashtra State Film Awards	Best Director	Raja Thakur	
1963	2nd Maharashtra State Film Awards	Best Actor	Arun Sarnaik	
1963	2nd Maharashtra State Film Awards	Best Music Director	Datta Davjekar, Vasant Pawar, Chhota Gandharva	
1963	2nd Maharashtra State Film Awards	Best Male Playback Singer	Chhota Gandharva	
1963	2nd Maharashtra State Film Awards	Best Female Playback Singer	Asha Bhosle	
1963	2nd Maharashtra State Film Awards	Best Editing	Bal Korde	
