= Patil =

Patil may refer to:

- Patil (title), an Indian title native to the states of Maharashtra and Karnataka
- Patil (surname), a surname used in Maharashtra, Karnataka and Telangana
- Captain Saurabh Patil, primary antagonist of the 2019 Indian film War, portrayed by Tiger Shroff and Yash Raaj Singh
- 12511 Patil, a minor planet
- Pastil, a Filipino packed rice dish

== See also ==
- Patel, an Indian surname
- Patel (village administration), a village accountant in parts of India
