= Anand Modak =

Indian music director, composer (1951–2014)

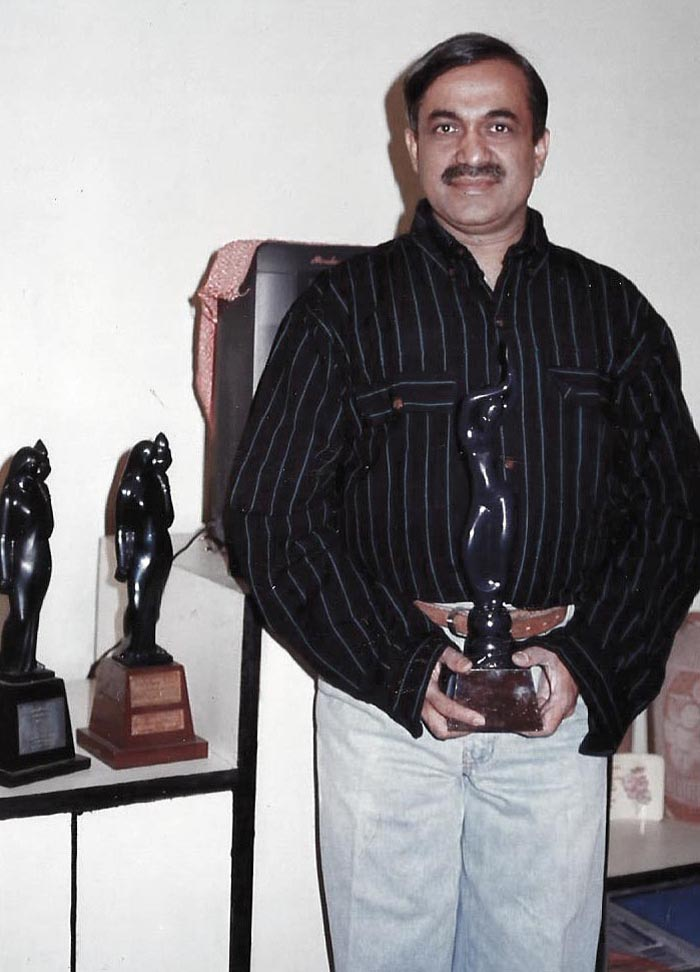
- Born: 13 May 1951; Akola, India
- Died: 23 May 2014 (aged 63); Pune, Maharashtra, India
- Occupations: Composer, music director
- Years active: 1972–2014
- Spouse: Ragini Modak (m. 1978)
- Website: www.anandmodak.com

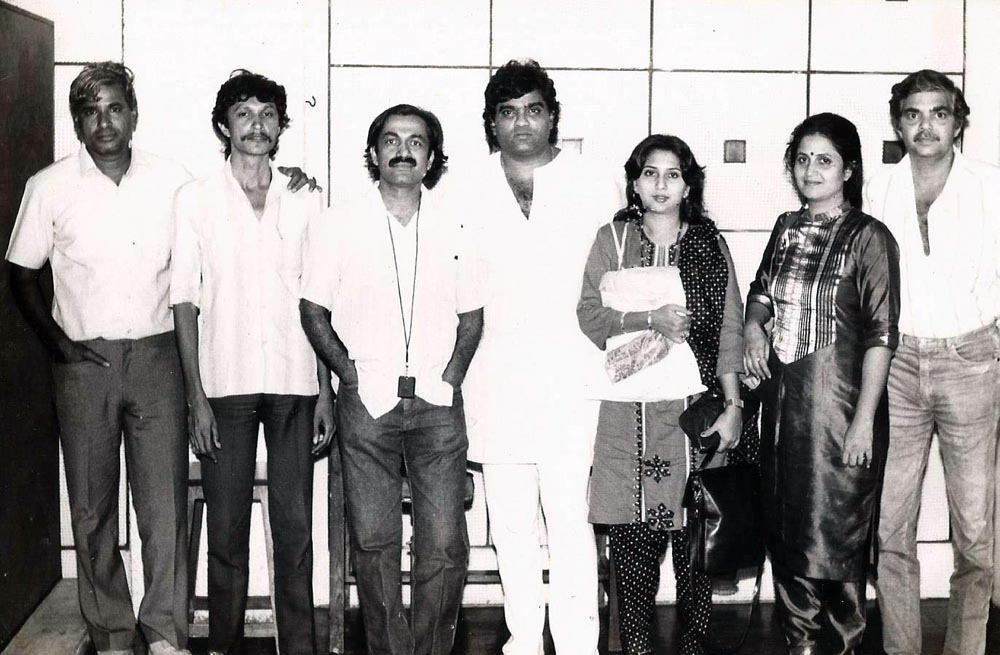

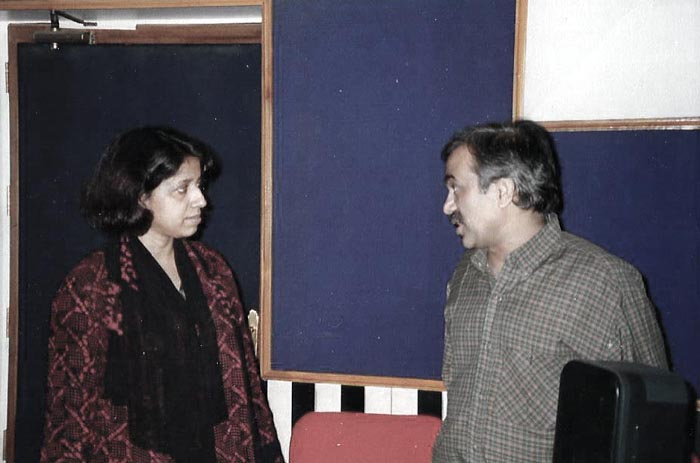

Anand Modak (Marathi: आनंद मोडक; 13 May 1951 – 23 May 2014) was a Marathi film composer and music director in Marathi cinema and Marathi theatre, known for his experimental style. His notable films include 22 June 1897 (1979), Kalat Nakalat (1989), Chaukat Raja (1991), Mukta (1994), Doghi (1995), Rao Sahab (1996), Sarkarnama (1997), Tu Tithe Mee (1998), Harishchandrachi Factory (2009), and Samaantar (2009). In theatre, his notable compositions were for Mahanirvan, Mahapoor, Kheliya, Raigadala Jeva Jag Yete, Begum Barve, Chaukatcha Raja and Mukta.

== Early life and background ==
He was born in Akola, where he completed his primary education from Akola Education Society, Akola and also took early lessons in music. His mother was a singer, and later for taking further lessons in Music he came to Pune. He graduated from S.P. College (University of Pune) in Pune.

== Career ==
Anand Modak composed music for several movies including Marathi, Hindi and English Films.

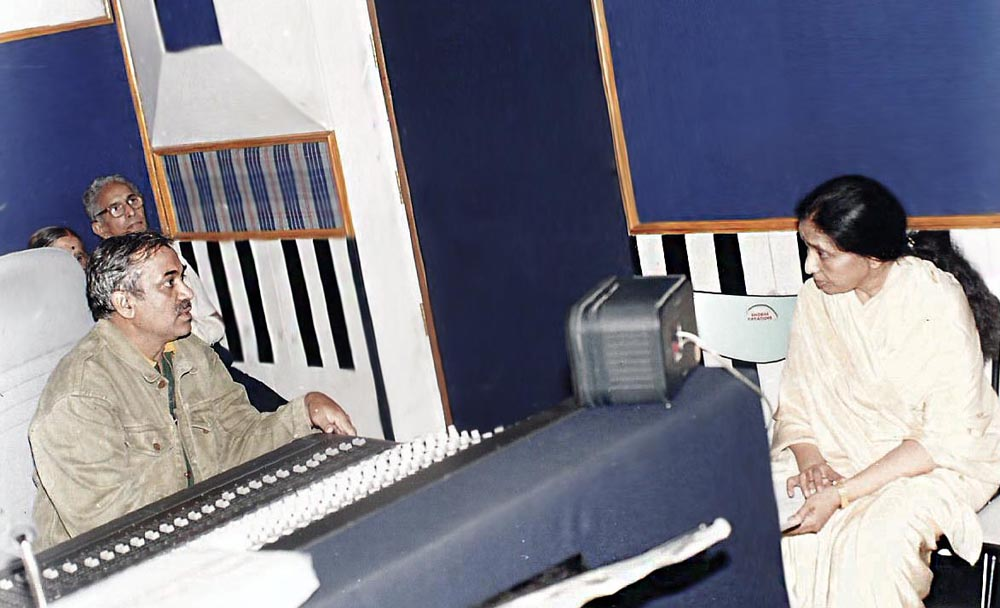

Modak started his music career in 1972, assisting Bhaskar Chandavarkar, the composer for Vijay Tendulkar's play Ghashiram Kotwal directed by Jabbar Patel in Pune. Later he started composing independently in 1974, with Satish Alekar's Marathi play Mahanirvan for Theatre Academy, Pune, a theatre organisation in 1973 he was also founder member of the academy.

Meanwhile, he worked with Bank of Maharashtra while still making music, he completed his 35 years service and retired from job in 2010. His work in theatre, lead to composing music for radio, television, plays and eventually Marathi cinema, and later in career devotional music. He was known for his experimental style, and with music without using much instruments. He even did cinematography for the film Naatigoti (2009).

Most notable mentions about music he has given for movies Chaukat Raja, Tu Tithe Mee and Harishchandrachi Factory, and plays like Mahapoor, Kheliya, Raigadala Jeva Jag Yete, Begum Barve, Chaukatcha Raja, and Mukta. One of his last films was biopic Yashwantrao Chavan – Bakhar Eka Vadalachi (2014). He won Maharashtra State Film Award for Best Music, for Doghi, Mukta, Raosaheb, and Dhoosar. Till date he is the only music director in Marathi film industry who won Maharashtra State Film Award for Best Music continuously for 3 years for the films Doghi, Mukta, and Raosaheb.

He died in Pune following a heart attack, at the age of 63. He was married to Ragini and had two daughters.

== Selected filmography ==
=== Films ===
As composer
Year	Title	Director	Language
1979	22 June 1897	Jayoo and Nachiket Patwardhan	Marathi
1988	Nashibwan	N. S. Vaidya	Marathi
1989	Kalat Nakalat	Kanchan Nayak	Marathi
1989	Suryoday	Gaganvihari Borate	Marathi
1990	Disha	Sai Paranjpye	Hindi
1991	Chakori	Sumitra Bhave–Sunil Sukthankar	Marathi
1991	Chaukat Raja	Sanjay Surkar	Marathi
1993	Lapandav	Shrabani Deodhar	Marathi
1994	Ghayaal	Purshottam Berde	Marathi
1994	Mukta	Jabbar Patel	Marathi
1995	Doghi	Sumitra Bhave–Sunil Sukthankar	Marathi
1995	Aai	Mahesh Manjrekar	Marathi
1996	Raosaheb	Nikhil Mahajan	Marathi
1997	Abhaas	Bijaya Jena	Hindi
1997	Sarkarnama	Shrabani Deodhar	Marathi
1998	Tu Tithe Mee	Sanjay Surkar	Marathi
1998	Gabhara	Rajeev Khandagale	Marathi
2000	Raju	Suhas Jog	Marathi
2000	Zindagi Zindabad	Sumitra Bhave–Sunil Sukthankar	Hindi
2006	Thaang	Amol Palekar	Marathi
2006	Quest	Amol Palekar	English
2006	Naatigothi	Gajendra Ahire	Marathi
2006	Divasen Divas	Gajendra Ahire	Marathi
2007	Dohaa	Pushkar Paranjape	Marathi
2007	Maaybaap	Mohanji Prasad	Marathi
2008	Savar Re	Gajendra Ahire	Marathi
2008	Urus	Shekhar Naik	Marathi
2008	Baaimanus	Kailash Jadhav	Marathi
2008	Satya	Nitin Kamble	Marathi
2009	Katha Tichya Lagnachi	Ashok Rane	Marathi
2009	Harishchandrachi Factory	Paresh Mokashi	Marathi
2009	Samaantar	Amol Palekar	Marathi
2010	Aarambh	Akshay Mahadik	Marathi
2010	Umang	Pitambar Kale	Marathi
2011	Dambis	Makarand Anaspure	Marathi
2012	Masala	Sandesh Kulkarni	Marathi
2013	Mhais	Shekhar Naik	Marathi
2014	Yashwantrao Chavan - Bakhar Eka Vadalachi	Jabbar Patel	Marathi
2014	Jay Shankar	Shekhar Naik	Marathi
2014	Khairlanjichya Mathyavar	Raju Meshram	Marathi
2014	Maalak	Vinod Khade	Marathi
2014	Rama Madhav	Mrinal Kulkarni	Marathi
2014	Elizabeth Ekadashi	Paresh Mokashi	Marathi
2014	Vimukta	Shekhar Naik	Marathi
2016	20 Mhanje 20	Uday Bhandarkar	Marathi

== Awards ==
- Maharashtra State Film Award for Best Music Director.
  - 1989 – Kalat Nakalat
  - 1994 – Mukta
  - 1995 – Doghi
  - 1996 - Raosaheb
  - 2000 - Raju
  - 2010 - Dhoosar
- Filmfare Award for Best Music Director – Marathi.
  - 1995 – Mukta
  - 1996 – Raosaheb
  - 1998 – Tu Tithe Mee
