= Ek Hota Vidushak =

- Theatrical release poster
- Directed by: Jabbar Patel
- Screenplay by: P. L. Deshpande
- Story by: Jabbar Patel
- Produced by: NFDC; Ravi Gupta; Ravi Malik
- Starring: Laxmikant Berde; Madhu Kambikar; Nilu Phule; Mohan Agashe; Varsha Usgaonkar; Dilip Prabhavalkar
- Cinematography: Harish Joshi
- Edited by: Vishwas-Anil
- Music by: Score: Anand Modak; Lyrics: N. D. Mahanor
- Release date: 1992
- Running time: 168 minutes
- Country: India
- Language: Marathi

Ek Hota Vidushak (English: Once There Was A Clown) is a 1992 Marathi film directed by Jabbar Patel and produced by National Film Development Corporation of India. The film stars Laxmikant Berde, Madhu Kambikar, Nilu Phule, Varsha Usgaonkar in lead roles and Mohan Agashe and Dilip Prabhavalkar in supporting roles.

The film portrays the life of folk theater artist and is considered one of the few films made on the life of tamasha artistes, including Pinjara (1972) and Natarang (2010). Laxmikant Berde, who is better known for his comic roles in Marathi and Hindi films, was appreciated for his role as Aburao. The film is based on a short story written by Jabbar Patel with screenplay and dialogues penned by the veteran Marathi writer, P. L. Deshpande (Pu. La.) after a hiatus of 39 years. Previously, Deshpande had written screenplay and dialogues for another Marathi film Gulacha Ganapati (1953) starring himself.

The film won several awards and was adjudged as the Best Film at Maharashtra State Film Awards (1993). It also won two National Film Awards at the 40th National Film Awards (1992); Best Feature Film in Marathi and Best Choreography for Laxmibai Kolhapurkar. Kolhapurkar became the first choreographer and the first woman to win the National Film Award for choreography. The film also participated at the Indian Panorama, International Film Festival of India in 1993.

== Plot ==
The film opens with Aburao (Laxmikant Berde), a famous film star in Maharashtra, performing the death rituals (Śrāddha) for his mother, Manjula (Madhu Kambikar), in his hometown of Begadewadi. As the rituals require a shaved head, he wears a wig to preserve the continuity of the films he is currently shooting. The media extensively cover the ceremony to capitalise on his popularity. Irritated by the attention, Aburao leaves the cremation ground and returns to his mother’s house, where memories of his childhood trigger a flashback.

Aburao is the illegitimate son of Manjula, a tamasha dancer. After leaving her troupe, she becomes the mistress of the politician and landlord Himmatrao Inamdar (Mohan Agashe). Following Inamdar’s sudden death, Manjula and Aburao are forced to return to tamasha, joining the troupe run by her sister Kausalya. While Manjula is mentored by Nana (Nilu Phule), young Aburao becomes fascinated by Nana’s ability to entertain audiences and dreams of becoming a “Songadya” (clown and impersonator).

As an adult, Aburao masters mimicry and singing, gaining fame for his political satire in the tamasha circuit. His childhood friend Gunawant (Dilip Prabhavalkar), now a minister, attends one of his performances and encourages him to establish his own troupe. Aburao does so with the support of Manjula and Nana. During celebrations marking the troupe’s 500th performance, Gunawant introduces him to film star Menaka (Varsha Usgaonkar). Impressed by his talent, she persuades him to enter the film industry. Although Aburao initially intends to act in only one film, he becomes drawn to fame and to Menaka, abandoning both his troupe and his pregnant girlfriend Subhadra (Pooja Pawar).

Aburao and Menaka eventually marry, but he later realises that she married him mainly to escape her lover Ravi (Tushar Dalvi). She admits that she loves the “Songadya” within him more than Aburao himself, as his clowning helps her forget her painful past. Years later, Nana visits Aburao with a young girl named Jaai and informs him that Subhadra has died. Nana reveals that Jaai is Aburao’s daughter and explains that she has never smiled. He asks Aburao to care for her. Bringing Jaai home creates tension between Aburao and Menaka, who eventually leaves him to reunite with Ravi.

Aburao repeatedly attempts to make Jaai smile through humour and performances, but she remains unmoved. She tells him that, unlike his audiences, she wants him to tell her a simple fairy tale like an ordinary father. Meanwhile, Gunawant, now Chief Minister, persuades Aburao to enter politics. As his popularity grows, Aburao gradually compromises his principles until Nana reminds him of his moral responsibilities. Gunawant seeks to exploit Aburao’s fame during an election rally and gives him medication to ensure he performs. However, Aburao suffers a heart attack during the event and notices Jaai in the audience. Realising what truly matters, he abandons his political speech and instead begins narrating a fairy tale. The audience leaves in disappointment, but Jaai stays to hear the story. As he completes it with sincerity and joy, Jaai finally smiles and laughs. Aburao, in turn, discovers the true meaning of love and fulfilment in life.

== Cast ==
- Laxmikant Berde as Aburao or Songadya
- Varsha Usgaonkar as Menaka
- Madhu Kambikar as Manjula Devgaonkar, Aburao's mother
- Usha Naik as Kausalya, Manjula’s sister
- Nilu Phule as Nana, Aburao's mentor
- Mohan Agashe as Himmatrao Inamdar
- Dilip Prabhavalkar as Gunwant, Chief Minister
- Tushar Dalvi as Ravi
- Pooja Pawar as Subhadra
- Aseem Deshpande as Young Aburao
- Himani Padhye as Jaai
- Sayaji Shinde as master
- Satish Tare as tamasha Group member

== Awards ==
Maharashtra State Film Awards

The film was adjudged as Best Marathi Film at the 1993 Maharashtra State Film Awards and also won more five awards.

- Best Marathi Film
- Best Screenplay for Pu. La. Deshpande
- Best Lyrics for N. D. Mahanor
- Best Choreography for Laxmibai Kolhapurkar
- Best Male Playback Singer for Ravindra Sathe for the song "Mee Gaatana Geet Tula Ladiwala"
- Best Script for Jabbar Patel

National Film Awards

The film won two National Film Awards at the 40th National Film Awards, awarded for the feature films released in 1992.

- National Film Award for Best Feature Film in Marathi

Citation - For its humane portrait of simple tamash clown sucked in by the glittering world of show business and exploited by politicians.

- National Film Award for Best Choreography - Laxmibai Kolhapurkar

Citation - For successfully adapting a popular folk theatre form to the screen.

== Soundtrack ==
Ek Hota Vidushak

Soundtrack album by Anand Modak
- Released: 1992
- Genre: Feature film soundtrack
- Length: 1:18:29
- Language: Marathi
- Label: Fountain Music
- Producer: Suresh Alurkar

The film soundtrack consists of 22 songs and was released on Fountain Music. Being a Tamasha oriented film, soundtrack primarily consists of songs based on Lavani. The music of the film is composed by veteran music director Anand Modak with the songs rendered by noted playback singers Asha Bhosle, Ravindra Sathe and Devaki Pandit. Poet and songwriter N. D. Mahanor (Na. Dho. Mahanor) who is known for his folk songs in Jait Re Jait (1977) has penned the lyrics.

Track listing
No.	Title	Singer(s)	Length
1.	"Bharala Aabhal Pavsali Pahuna Ga - 1"	Asha Bhosle	4:22
2.	"Kutha Tumhi Gela Hota Sanga Karbhari"	Asha Bhosle and chorus	4:41
3.	"Mee Gaatana Geet Tula Ladiwala - 1"	Ravindra Sathe	5:28
4.	"Gachch Lakhalakha Bor Tava Tutali - 1"	Asha Bhosle	0:44
5.	"Lal Paithani Rang Majhya Cholila"	Asha Bhosle, Chandrakant Kale	4:01
6.	"Gachch Lakhalakha Bor Tava Tutali - 2"	Uttara Kelkar	3:26
7.	"Puravi Surya Udayla Ji"	Asha Bhosle	3:08
8.	"Ujal Ujalalya - 1"	Jayashree Shivram, Ravindra Sathe	4:23
9.	"Mothyansathi Khote Hasu"	Ravindra Sathe	3:39
10.	"Radhe, Yamunechya Kathavar Dorva"	Ravindra Sathe, Devaki Pandit and chorus	4:36
11.	"Bhar Tarunyacha Mala"	Asha Bhosle, Ravindra Sathe and chorus	3:34
12.	"Gan (Shabdancha Ha Khel Mandala)"	Ravindra Sathe, Chandrakant Kale, Mukund Fansalkar, Prabhanjan Marathe	3:22
13.	"Tarana"	Ravindra Sathe, Devaki Pandit	1:38
14.	"Mee Gaatana Geet Tula Ladiwala - 2"	Asha Bhosle, Ravindra Sathe	5:30
15.	"Lal Paithani Rang Majhya Cholila"	Devaki Pandit, Ravindra Sathe	4:02
16.	"Kunachi Ga Madi"	Asha Bhosle and chorus	2:30
17.	"Gadad Jambhal Bharal Aabhal"	Ravindra Sathe, Uttara Kelkar, Arun Ingle	3:14
18.	"Bharala Aabhal Pavsali Pahuna Ga - 2"	Devaki Pandit	4:21
19.	"Suryanarayana Nit Nemane Ugava"	Devaki Pandit	1:31
20.	"Kadi Varati Madi"	Ravindra Sathe	2:08
21.	"Ujal Ujalalya - 2"	Jayashree Shivram	4:23
22.	"Tumhi Jau Naka"	Asha Bhosle, Devaki Pandit and chorus	3:48
Total length:			1:18:29
