= Hindurao =

Hindurao is a masculine given name. Notable people and fictional characters with the name include:

- Hindurao Naik Nimbalkar, Indian politician
- Hindurao Dhonde Patil, fictional sugar baron in the 1974 film Samna
