= Musafir (1986 film) =

- Directed by: Jabbar Patel
- Written by: Vijay Tendulkar; Gulzar
- Based on: Ashi Pakhare Yeti by Vijay Tendulkar
- Produced by: Jabbar Patel; D. V. Rao
- Starring: Rekha; Naseeruddin Shah; Moon Moon Sen
- Music by: R. D. Burman
- Production company: Swastika Motion Pictures
- Release date: 1986
- Running time: 144 min
- Country: India
- Language: Hindi

Musafir (transl. Traveller) is a 1986 Indian Hindi drama film written and directed by Jabbar Patel. Based on Vijay Tendulkar's Marathi play Ashi Pakhare Yeti, the film is part of India's neorealist art films, known in India as parallel cinema.

== Cast ==
The cast is as follows:

- Rekha as Saraswasti Pillai
- Naseeruddin Shah as Sadanand
- Moon Moon Sen as Shyama
- Mohan Agashe as P A Pillai
- Benjamin Gilani as Anand
- Pankaj Kapur as Shankeran Pillai
- Usha Nadkarni as Parvati Pillai

== Production ==
Filming of the film completed in 1986.

== Soundtrack ==
All lyrics are written by Gulzar; all music is composed by R. D. Burman

No.	Title	Artist(s)	Length
1.	"Sawan Saanwari Ankhiyan Choome"	Asha Bhosle
2.	"Aapse Itni Si Guzarish Hai" (Raga: Bhoopali)	Ravindra Sathe
3.	"Ho Bahut Raat Huyi Thak Gaya Hoon"	Kishore Kumar

== Release and reception ==
The film did not have a theatrical release, but was released on VHS. The National Film Development Corporation of India decided to restore it in 2010.

== Sources ==
- Arunachalam, Param (14 April 2020). BollySwar: 1981 - 1990. Mavrix Infotech Private Limited. ISBN 978-81-938482-2-7.
- Rajadhyaksha, Ashish; Willemen, Paul (1999). Encyclopedia of Indian Cinema. Routledge. ISBN 978-1-135-94325-7.
