= Patil (surname) =

Patil is an Indian surname used in Maharashtra, Karnataka, Telangana, and Goa.

In Armenia, Patil is a female given name. It means 'snowflake' in Armenian.

== Notable people ==
- Anjali Patil, theater and Hindi film actress
- Anuja Patil, a cricketer from Kolhapur, Maharashtra played in Twenty20 Internationals for India
- B B Patil, Member of Parliament, Zahirabad, Telangana
- B. G. Kolse Patil, former judge Bombay High Court
- B. J. Khatal-Patil (1919 - 2019), former Maharashtra Cabinet Minister, Politician and Independence Activist
- Babagouda Patil, Senior BJP Leader, former MP and Union Minister of Rural Areas & Employment
- Bal Patil, was a Jain scholar, journalist, social activist and Jain minority status advocate from Mumbai, Maharashtra
- Balasaheb Vikhe Patil, former member of the Indian Parliament and member of Indian National Congress
- Bandu Patil (1 January 1936 – 23 August 1988), Olympic Gold medal Men's hockey 1964 - Tokyo
- Basangouda Patil, former Union minister of state for Railways and Textiles
- Basavraj Madhavrao Patil, MLA, Ausa, Latur, and former Minister for Rural Development, Government of Maharashtra
- C. R. Patil, Indian politician who is state president of BJP Gujarat and serving as the 2nd Minister of Jal Shakti.
- Chandrakant Bacchu Patil, Indian politician who is state president BJP Maharashtra. He has served as the Cabinet Minister of Maharashtra.
- D. Y. Patil, former governor of Bihar
- Dilip Walse-Patil, Maharashtra MLA, and Former Finance Minister, Home minister government of Maharashtra
- Dinkar D. Patil, prominent Marathi film director, scriptwriter, and dialogue writer in Marathi film industry
- Dinkar Patil, four times MLA from Tasgaon, Sangli, Maharashtra. Good contribution in irrigation facilities for Tasgaon.
- DJ Patil, Chief Data Scientist of the United States Office of Science and Technology Policy
- Dnyaneshwar Patil (died 2024), Indian politician
- Ganpat Patil, a notable actor in Marathi movies and drama.
- Gulabrao Patil, former President Maharashtra state Congress and MP
- H. K. Patil, Former Minister for Rural Development and Panchayat Raj, Government of Karnataka.
- Harshavardhan Patil, former Cabinet Minister for Sehkar from Maharashtra
- Jayant Patil, former Rural Development Minister of Maharashtra
- Kailash Patil, Indian football player playing for club ONGC FC
- Karmaveer Bhaurao Patil, a social activist and educator in Maharashtra, India; founder of Rayat Education Society
- Kavita Patil, an actress who played Sergeant Medawar in the American television show The Unit.
- Krantisinha Nana Patil, elected to the Lok Sabha in 1957 from north Satara constituency from Communist Party of India. He was the first to give a speech in Marathi on the floor of Parliament
- Krushnaa Patil, an Indian mountaineer. She is known as the second youngest Indian to climb Mount Everest at an age of 19.
- M. B. Patil, Former Minister for Water Resources, Government of Karnataka,
- Manjusha Kulkarni-Patil, a Hindustani classical music vocalist
- Dr Neeraj Patil, Former mayor of Lambeth, London
- Padamsinh Bajirao Patil (born 1940), Indian politician and former home minister of Maharashtra state
- Pandharinath Sitaramji Patil, Politician, Social Reformer, Biographer
- Pratibha Patil, former President Of India
- Pratik Patil, former Minister of State for Mining & coal of India
- Pratik Prakashbapu Patil, a member of the 15th Lok Sabha of India. He is son of former Loksabha member Prakash-bapu Patil & also grandson of former chief minister of maharashtra Vasantdada Patil.
- R. R. Patil, former Deputy Chief Minister of Maharashtra, Home Minister of Maharashtra
- Ram Patil, king of Janjira
- Rana Jagjitsinh Bajirao Patil (born 1971), Indian politician based in Osmanabad and former minister in government of Maharashtra
- Ranjit Patil, former Minister of State Maharashtra
- Rupatai Patil Nilangekar (born 1957), Indian politician from Maharashtra and former member of parliament, Lok Sabha
- S. R. Patil, Ex Minister for Infrastructure, Information Technology, Biotechnology, Science and Technology, Planning and Statistics, Government of Karnataka,
- Sadashiv Kanoji Patil (abbreviated as S. K. Patil) (1898–1981) was a former Congress leader from Maharashtra.
- Sambhaji Patil Nilangekar (born 1977), Indian politician and former minister for food supply in Government of Maharashtra
- Sandeep Patil, former Indian cricket player
- Shalini Patil, former deputy Chief Minister of Maharashtra and widow of Former Maharashtra Chief Minister, Vasantdada Patil
- Sharan Prakash Patil, Former Minister for Medical Education, Government of Karnataka,
- Shivaji Lotan Patil, an Indian film director. He bagged the 60th National Award for Best Director for his Marathi film Dhag.
- Shivajirao Nilangekar Patil (1931 - 2020), Former Chief Minister of Maharashtra
- Shivraj Patil, former Home Minister of India and Defence Minister of India.
- Shriniwas Dadasaheb Patil (born 11 April 1941), is the present Governor of Sikkim, India, and a member of the Nationalist Congress Party (NCP).
- Smita Patil (1955 - 1986), Bollywood actress
- Suhas Patil, founder of fabless semiconductor supplier company Cirrus Logic headquartered in Austin, Texas
- Suryakanta Patil, a member of the 14th Lok Sabha of India. She represented the Hingoli & Nanded constituency.
- Swapnil Patil, an Emirati cricketer. He played for the United Arab Emirates in the 2014 Cricket World Cup Qualifier tournament.
- V. L. Patil, politician and independence activist
- Vasantdada Patil, former Chief Minister of Maharashtra & Governor of Rajasthan
- Veerendra Patil, former Chief Minister of Karnataka
- Vijaysinh Mohite-Patil, a former Deputy Chief Minister of Maharashtra.
- Vimla Patil, an Indian journalist, author, activist, columnist, writer
- Vishwas Nangare Patil, IPS officer.
- Vishwas Patil, Indian author, historian, known for his work Panipat (novel about Third Battle of Panipat).
- Vivek Patil, politician of the Peasants and Workers Party of India (शेतकरी कामगार पक्ष). A three-time MLA in the Maharashtra Legislative Assembly.

=== Fictional ===
- Padma and Parvati Patil, identical twins in Harry's year in the Harry Potter books by J. K. Rowling.
- Hindurao Dhonde Patil, fictional character in Samna (1974)

== See also ==
- Patil (title)
