= Kalat Nakalat =

- Theatrical release poster
- Directed by: Kanchan Nayak
- Screenplay by: S. N. Navre
- Based on: "Shunyachi Vyatha" by Shakuntala Gogte
- Produced by: Smita Talwalkar
- Starring: Ashok Saraf; Vikram Gokhale; Savita Prabhune; Ashwini Bhave; Nilu Phule; Sulabha Deshpande; Raja Mayekar
- Cinematography: Rajan Kinagi
- Edited by: Vishwas Anil
- Music by: Anand Modak
- Production company: Asmita Chitra
- Release date: 11 December 1989
- Running time: 120 minutes
- Country: India
- Language: Marathi

Kalat Nakalat (transl. Unknowingly) is a 1989 Indian Marathi-language social film directed by Kanchan Nayak and produced by Smita Talwalkar. The film stars Savita Prabhune, Ashwini Bhave, Vikram Gokhale, Ashok Saraf, Sulabha Deshpande. Music by Anand Modak. Film received widespread critical acclaim and won three national film awards.

== Cast ==
- Vikram Gokhale as Manohar Desai
- Savita Prabhune as Uma Desai
- Ashok Saraf as Chotu
- Ashwini Bhave as Manisha
- Nilu Phule as Nana Garud
- Sulabha Deshpande as Chotu and Uma's mother
- Mrunmayee Chandorkar as Chhakuli
- Omey Ambre as Bachhu
- Raja Mayekar as Office Staff
- Nandini Jog as Chhotu's Wife
- Chandu Parkhi as Office Staff
- Ravindra Mahajani as Guest Appearance

== Plot ==
Manohar and Uma are a happily married couple with two children. One day, Uma learns about her husband's extra marital affair and decides to leave him taking the kids along with her. The climax is as expected, not before couple of roller coaster rides in the story.

== Soundtrack ==
Kalat NaKalat

Soundtrack album by Anand Modak
- Released: 1989
- Genre: Feature film soundtrack
- Length: 14.55
- Language: Marathi
- Label: Tips Music

The music has been provided by Anand Modak and Lyrics Were Written by Sudhir Moghe. Anuradha Paudwal won Her Maiden National Film Award For Best Female Playback Singer for the song He Ek Reshami Gharate.

=== Track listing ===
No.	Title	Singer(s)	Length
1	"He ek Reshami Gharte "	Anuradha Paudwal; Ravindra Sathe	4.55
2	"Nakawarchya Ragala Aaushadh Kay "	Ashok Saraf	7.20
3	"Mana tujhe Manogat"	Asha Bhosle	2.40

== Accolades ==
Awards	Year	Category	Recipient	Result	Ref
National Film Awards	1989	National Film Award for Best Marathi Feature Film	Smita Talvalkar; Kanchan Nayak	Won	
National Film Awards	1989	National Film Award for Best Female Playback Singer	Anuradha Paudwal	Won	
National Film Awards	1989	National Film Award for Best Child Artist	Mrunmayi Chandorkar	Won	
Maharashtra State Film Awards	1989	Maharashtra State Film Award for Best Film	Smita Talvalkar	Won	
Maharashtra State Film Awards	1989	Maharashtra State Film Award for Best Director	Kanchan Nayak	Won	
Maharashtra State Film Awards	1989	Maharashtra State Film Award for Best Actor	Vikram Gokhale	Won	
Maharashtra State Film Awards	1989	Maharashtra State Film Award for Best Actress	Savita Prabhune	Won	
Maharashtra State Film Awards	1989	Maharashtra State Film Award for Best Music Director	Anand Modak	Won	
Maharashtra State Film Awards	1989	Maharashtra State Film Award for Best Lyricist	Sudhir Moghe	Won	
Maharashtra State Film Awards	1989	Maharashtra State Film Award for Best Female Playback Singer	Asha Bhosle	Won	
