= Umbartha =

Umbartha ( Hindi title Subah)
- Film poster
- Directed by: Jabbar Patel
- Written by: Vijay Tendulkar; Vasant Dev (dialogue)
- Screenplay by: Vijay Tendulkar
- Based on: Marathi novel Beghar by Shanta Nisal
- Produced by: Jabbar Patel; D. V. Rao
- Starring: Smita Patil; Girish Karnad; Shrikant Moghe; Ashalata Wabgaonkar; Kusum Kulkarni; Purnima Ganu
- Cinematography: Rajan Kinagi
- Edited by: N. S. Vaidya
- Music by: Hridaynath Mangeshkar; Ravindra Sathe (background score)
- Release date: 1 January 1982
- Country: India
- Language: Marathi

Umbartha (IPA: Umbaraṭhā; English: The Doorstep) is a 1982 Indian drama film produced by D. V. Rao and directed and coproduced by Jabbar Patel. The film was simultaneously shot in Marathi and Hindi, the latter titled Subah, with the same cast. It tells the story of a woman's dream to step outside her four walled home and bring change in the society. Smita Patil played the lead protagonist in the film for which she won Marathi Rajya Chitrapat Puraskar for Best Actress. The film was adjudged as the Best Feature Film in Marathi at the 29th National Film Awards for "a sincere cinematic statement on the theme of a woman seeking to establish her identity by pursuing a career, even at the risk of alienation from her family".

The film is based on a Marathi novel Beghar (transl. Homeless) by Shanta Nisal. This film also tells the social issues on LGBTQ in 80s.

== Plot ==
Sulabha Mahajan is a woman who dreams to step out of the four walls of the house, assume greater responsibility as a citizen and play an important role in shaping the society. She has passion to do something constructive for the abused, assaulted, neglected and traumatized womenfolk of the society she lives in. She gets a job offer as Superintendent of a Women's Reformatory Home in a remote town of Sangamwadi. The job offer raises objections from her lawyer husband Subhash and conservative mother-in-law who refuse to understand her need to move to the town and work for rehabilitation of the women. But her sister-in-law supports her by offering help in looking after her young daughter Rani. Determined Sulabha then goes ahead with her dream job.

She meets various challenges in her new endeavor. She starts with bringing discipline in the Home and also discovers frauds that take place there. But she is not helped by the managing committee which is filled with selfish and careless people. She hence decides to take steps against their sanction. She starts some classes to educate willing women and also marries off one of the inmates in order to give a new start to her life. She discovers how a local MLA Bane has been regularly using the inmates of the home to satisfy his sexual needs. Two of the inmates decide to run away but are forcefully brought back to the home. They both commit suicide by burning themselves. Sulabha is then questioned by committee and newspapers for her improper control on the home. An administrative enquiry is set up against her. It is then that she decides to resign and give up all her work and return home.

When she returns to her home she is happily welcomed by her sister-in-law but not so much by her daughter and mother-in-law. She then discovers that her husband Subhash has been involved with another woman in her absence. His betrayal changes her mind and she again sets off to follow her dream work.

== Cast ==
- Smita Patil as Sulabha Mahajan
- Girish Karnad as Advocate Subhash Mahajan
- Shrikant Moghe as Dr. Mohan Mahajan (Subhash's elder brother)
- Ashalata Wabgaonkar as Maya Mahajan (Mohan's wife)
- Kusum Kulkarni as Mrs. Mahajan (Sulabha's mother-in-law)
- Pournima Ganu (Manohar) as Rani
- Radha Karnad as young Rani
- Satish Alekar as Walimbe (principal)
- Mukund Chitale as Gate-man
- Surekha Divakar as Farida
- Daya Dongre as Chairman Sheela Samson
- Ravi Patwardhan as MLA Bane
- Vijay Joshi as Peon
- Jayamala Kale as Sugandha
- Sandhya Kale as Heera, Clerk / Typist
- Swaroopa Khopkar as Utpala Joshi
- Manorama Wagle as Kamalabai

== Soundtrack ==
The soundtrack of the film is composed by Hridaynath Mangeshkar on lyrics written by Vasant Bapat and Suresh Bhat. All songs are sung by Lata Mangeshkar, except "Ganjalya Othas Majhya" which is sung by Ravindra Sathe. "Sunya Sunya Maifilit Majhya" became the most popular song that time.

No.	Title	Singer(s)	Length
1.	"Sunya Sunya Maifilit Majhya"	Lata Mangeshkar	04:22
2.	"Ganjalya Onthas Majhya"	Ravindra Sathe	04:47
3.	"Chand Matala Matala"	Lata Mangeshkar	05:45
4.	"Gagan Sadan Tejomay"	Lata Mangeshkar	04:37

== Awards ==
- 1982 – National Film Award for Best Feature Film in Marathi
- 1982 – Maharashtra State Film Awards – Best Film
- 1982 – Maharashtra State Film Awards – Best Director – Jabbar Patel
- 1982 – Maharashtra State Film Awards – Best Actress – Smita Patil
- 1981 - Filmfare Awards Marathi - Best Actress.
