= Teesri Azadi =

2006 Indian Hindi-language film on caste system

- Directed by: Jabbar Patel
- Produced by: Lord Communication
- Production company: Lord Communication
- Release date: 2006
- Running time: 120.06 minutes
- Country: India
- Language: Hindi

Teesri Azadi is a 2006 Indian Hindi-language film on caste system by Jabbar Patel. Film is based on "twisted version" of Ramayana and Mahabharata. This film was distributed on CDs in different parts of India by Akhil Bharatiya Baba Sahab Dr Ambedkar Samaj Sudhar Samiti, Bhimrao Ambedkar Samaj Sudhar Samiti and Ambedkar Boudhik Sanghathan. In July 2006, shooting Teesri Azadi was completed in Maharashtra and released online on YouTube. The distributors of the movie claimed that they have support of Bahujan Samaj Party (BSP) but BSP rejected these claims and a CBI investigation was ordered by Chief Minister Mayawati into the making of the movie over allegations of creating communal disharmony. The investigation initially resulted in arrested of three people involved in the making of the movie.
