= Yashwantrao Chavan: Bakhar Eka Vaadalaachi =

Indian Marathi language film

- Directed by: Jabbar Patel
- Written by: Arun Sadhu
- Starring: Nana Patekar; Ashok Lokhande; Lubna Salim; Om Bhutkar
- Cinematography: Syed Layak Ali
- Music by: Anand Modak
- Release date: 14 March 2014
- Country: India
- Language: Marathi

Yashwantrao Chavan: Bakhar Eka Vaadalaachi is an Indian Marathi language film directed by Jabbar Patel. The film stars Nana Patekar, Ashok Lokhande, Lubna Salim, Om Bhutkar and Vaishali Dabhade. Music is by Anand Modak. The film was released on 14 March 2014.

== Synopsis ==
Yashwantrao Chavan, born to a poor family in Karad, attempts to bring about a change by becoming the Chief Minister of Maharashtra and later a minister in the Central Government.

== Cast ==
- Nana Patekar
- Ashok Lokhande as Yashwantrao Chavan
- Om Bhutkar as young Yashwantrao Chavan
- Lubna Salim
- Vaishali Dabhade
- Meena Naik
- Rekha Kamat
- Suyog Suresh Deshpande as Sharad Pawar
- Bhargavi Chirmule Special appearance

== Soundtrack ==
Yashwantrao Chavan: Bakhar Eka Vaadalaachi

Soundtrack album by Anand Modak
- Released: 2014
- Recorded: 2014
- Genre: Feature film soundtrack
- Length: 57:30
- Language: Marathi

Track listing
| No. | Title | Singer(s) | Length |
|---|---|---|---|
| 1. | "Yashwant Asa Gunvanta" | Nandesh Umap | 1:54 |
| 2. | "Sangmavar Ya Nadyache" | Vibhavari Apte -Joshi | 7:04 |
| 3. | "Khalchya Aadit Gaato" | Anand Shinde | 3:27 |
| 4. | "Gadhgadh Abhunta" | Urmila Dhangar | 4:25 |
| 5. | "Deshbhakta Praasad" | Nandesh Umap | 1:34 |
| 6. | "Ulati Ho Gayee" | Arati Ankalikar-Tikekar | 3:02 |
| 7. | "Swatantra Lade Petle" | Nandesh Umap | 3:11 |
| 8. | "Swatantryacha Powada" | Nandesh Umap | 0:34 |
| 9. | "Sangamavar Ya Nadyachya" | Ravindra Sathe | 7:05 |
| 10. | "Nadaricha Deesa" | Urmila Dhangar | 4:53 |
| 11. | "Yashwant Bahu Gunvanta" | Nandesh Umap | 3:31 |
| 12. | "Sakhe Nayan Kuranga" | Urmila Dhangar | 2:47 |
| 13. | "Maharashtra Powada" | Nandesh Umap | 1:42 |
| 14. | "Mai Bapachya Poti" | Urmila Dhangar | 3:52 |
| 15. | "Garja Jayjaykar" | Shankar Mahadevan | 4:54 |
| 16. | "Ubhavila Mala" | Ravindra Sathe | 6:15 |
| Total length: | | | 57:30 |

== Critical response ==
Yashwantrao Chavan: Bakhar Eka Vaadalaachi film received positive reviews from critics. A Reviewer of The Times of India gave the film 3.5 stars out of 5 and wrote "A tighter script would have been an added advantage but that apart, the film is very well researched and a must watch for those who want to get a sneak peak[sic] into India’s political history". Sunil Nandgaonkar of The Indian Express wrote "The films fares well on music, VFX, and other technical aspects. Though, it is definitely worth a watch, one could come away with the feeling of having sat through a good documentary rather than a feature film on YB Chavan’s life". A Reviewer of Divya Marathi says "This is a perfect piece of art that the youth must watch. Powerful screenplay, perfect direction, perfect acting and suitable music have all come together in the movie". A Reviewer of Loksatta wrote "Anand Modak has handled the important responsibility of music in this film, keeping in mind the importance of folk music, literature and social cause, the importance of folk arts in the formative period of Maharashtra". Soumitra Pote of Maharashtra Times gave the film 2 stars out of 5 and wrote "The failure of this film is that it is only at the level of 'documentary'. However, the film has become just a breeze while presenting the crest of the storm".
