= Samna (film) =

1974 Indian crime drama film

- Poster
- Directed by: Jabbar Patel
- Written by: Jabbar Patel; Vijay Tendulkar
- Produced by: Ramdas Phutane; Madhav Ganbote
- Starring: Mohan Agashe; Nilu Phule; Shriram Lagoo; Smita Patil; Vilas Rakate
- Cinematography: Suryakant Lavande
- Edited by: N. S. Vaidya
- Release date: 1974
- Running time: 151 minutes
- Country: India
- Language: Marathi
- Budget: ₹2.25 lakh

Samna (transl. Match) is a 1974 Indian Marathi-language crime drama film directed by Jabbar Patel and written by Vijay Tendulkar. The film starring Mohan Agashe, Nilu Phule, Shriram Lagoo, and Smita Patil in key roles. It was entered into the 25th Berlin International Film Festival and also won National Film Award for Best Marathi Feature Film at 23rd National Film Awards.

Samna was Jabbar Patel's debut Marathi film, featuring a screenplay and dialogue by Vijay Tendulkar in his first independent project, initially struggled to engage audiences. However, a German delegation recognized the performances of Nilu Phule and Shreeram Lagoo, leading to the film's selection for the Berlin Film Festival. This international acknowledgment, combined with positive word-of-mouth, contributed to its successful re-release in 1975. Ultimately, the film garnered significant acclaim, winning three national awards, seven Maharashtra State awards, and three Filmfare awards.

== Plot ==
A middle-aged penniless drunkard arrives at a sleepy village by bus. At the bus stand, people are talking about some "Maruti Kamble" in a hushed tone. The news of his arrival reaches the sugar baron Mr. Hindurao Dhonde-Patil through his henchman who expresses his doubt that the drunkard may be a sleuth sent by the central government. Hindurao is worried. Hindurao invites the drunkard to his mansion and provides him space to live in order to keep an eye on him. He asks the drunkard some direct questions like who he is and where he comes from. But the drunkard dodges his questions by giving some philosophical or imbecile answers. He does not even reveal his name. Hindurao decides to call him "Master" (teacher). Hindurao tells Master how backwards this village was and how Hindurao worked hard for the progress of the village. Now there is a sugar factory, poultry, school, etc. for the village. Master observes that the progress is not of the village but only of Hindurao. Master is perpetually drunk and again overhears people asking, "what became of Maruti Kamble?". He asks people about Maruti Kamble, but they suddenly become silent. When Hindurao discovers that Master is enquiring about Maruti Kamble, he gets worried. Finally, he calls him and makes a pact with him. The pact is that Hindurao would tell Master everything about Maruti Kamble and Master would stop his inquiries and leave the village. Hindurao says that Maruti Kamble was a military man and posed a challenge to Mr Hindurao's economic and political progress, so Hindurao falsely implicated him in a crime. He alleged that Maruti Kamble had an extramarital affair with a widow. The villagers could not tolerate such immoral behaviour. Maruti Kamble thought that people would believe the charges to be true and try to kill him, so he tried to run away. Before the police could get him, Hindurao had Maruti Kamble murdered and people thought that Maruti Kamble had run away to escape villagers' wrath, though some people had their "doubts". As Hindurao had told the truth about Maruti Kamble, it is the Master's turn to leave the village. But Master is a man of conscience. Master had fought in the independence struggle of India and is pained to see that though people had become free of the British rule, they are again being exploited by persons like Hindurao. Now should he fight against the tyranny of Hindurao too? Master leaves the village. Outside the village, at the district headquarters, people notice that Master has made a demand to the government that an inquiry be made into the misdeeds of Maruti Kamble and that Maruti Kamble be found and brought to justice. Master has also decided to fast until his demand is met and he is ready to fast until death. Hindurao anticipates the results and contacts district administrators and politicians, but they show no inclination to help him out. Hindurao tries to give a speech in order to divert the attention of people from the topic of Maruti Kamble but people ask, "What became of Maruti Kamble?" and shout him down. Hindurao runs away to Mumbai and in his absence chaos spreads in the management of his factory and poultry. Other politicians are eager to fill in this vacuum. Master reaches Hindurao's hideout and persuades him to face reality and surrender in order to give himself a chance. Finally Hindurao surrenders to the police. As police handcuff Hindurao in front of villagers and lead him to the police vehicle, Hindurao turns to Master and gives only a smile without malice. There ends the confrontation (Saamana) between a penniless drunkard and a potentate.

== Cast ==
- Nilu Phule as Hindurao Dhonde Patil
- Shriram Lagoo as Master
- Usha Naik as Suhini
- Smita Patil as Kamley
- Mohan Agashe as Maruti Kamble
- Sanjivani Bidkar as Mrs. Patil
- Vilas Rakate as Sarjerao
- Lalan Sarang
- Anant Audkar
- Shivaji Bhosle
- Rajni Chauhan
- Jayant Dharmadhikari
- Aswale Guruji
- Bhalchandra Kulkarni
- Uday Lagoo
- Gulab Latkar
- Salim Latkar
- Nandu Paranjpe

== Production ==
The film's producer, Ramdas Phutane, approached renowned playwright Vijay Tendulkar to write the script. During a press conference, Jabbar Patel, who had previously worked as an assistant director with Dada Kondke on films Ekta Jeev Sadashiv and Haryana Narya Zindabad, was appointed as the director.

Samna is based on a screenplay by Vijay Tendulkar, marking Jabbar Patel's debut in Marathi cinema and Tendulkar's first independent script in the language. Tendulkar initially selected the title "Savalila Bhiu Nakos" (transl. Don't be afraid of the shadow) for the movie. However, this title was perceived as more appropriate for a play and was not widely understood. Following a request from Patel and his team, Tendulkar revised the title after eight to ten days, opting for "Samna". Phutane securing a loan of ₹1.5 lakh for the film's production.

== Reception ==
Samna garnered international acclaim when it was featured at the Berlin International Film Festival, facilitated by the intervention of actress Nargis, who assisted with the formalities and ensured the film was presented with German subtitles.

== Legacy ==
Samna is recognized as a pioneering work in Marathi cinema for its bold exploration of political corruption and social exploitation. The film's incisive portrayal of cooperative sugar lobby politics and the exploitation of marginalized communities in rural Maharashtra established it as a significant cultural artifact. The film's powerful dialogues and strong performances by Phule and Lagoo were highly praised, leading to its eventual success as a box office hit and a critical favorite. The film is lauded for its profound influence on Marathi cinema, marking a pivotal shift towards scrutinizing systemic corruption and social inequities.

== Soundtrack ==
Samna

Soundtrack album by Lata Mangeshkar, Ravindra Sathe
- Released: 31 May 1974
- Recorded: Giriraj Pictures, Mumbai
- Genre: Feature film soundtrack
- Length: 52:13
- Language: Marathi
- Producers: Ramdas Phutane, Madhav Ganbote

Official audio
- Samna - Full Album on YouTube

The music for Samna is composed by Bhaskar M. Chandravarkar and the lyrics are by, Jagdish Khebudkar, Jabbar Patel and Aarti Prabhu.

Track listing
No.	Title	Singer(s)	Length
1.	"Ya Topikhali Dadlay Kay"	Sriram Lagoo, Ravindra Sathe	4:13
2.	"Konacha Khandyavar Konache Ozhe"	Ravindra Sathe	4:42
3.	"Sakhya Chala Bhagamadhi"	Usha Mangeshkar	4:28
4.	"Raya Asa Zhombu Naka Angaala"	Usha Mangeshkar	4:40
5.	"Sakhya Re Ghaayaal Mee Harini"	Lata Mangeshkar	3:59
Total length:			0:22:00

== Awards and nominations ==
Year	Category	Cast/Crew member	Status
25th Berlin International Film Festival
1975	Golden Berlin Bear	Jabbar Patel	Nominated
