= Hindurao Dhonde Patil =

Fictional character

- Samna character
- Nilu Phule as Hindurao Dhonde Patil
- First appearance: Samna (1974)
- Created by: Vijay Tendulkar
- Portrayed by: Nilu Phule

In-universe information
- Gender: Male
- Occupation: Sugar baron
- Nationality: Indian

Hindurao Dhonde Patil (Note: Indian English: [hɪnduraːv dʰoːɳɖeː pɑːʈiːl]; Marathi pronunciation: [ˈhiɳduraʋ dʱoːɳɖeː ˈpaːʈil]) is a fictional character in the 1974 Marathi film Samna. Played by Nilu Phule, depicted as a manipulative sugar baron. The on-screen dynamic between Phule and Shriram Lagoo is considered one of the film's most memorable moments.

== Development ==
The film's producer, Ramdas Phutane, sought out Vijay Tendulkar to write a script that would honor the performances of Nilu Phule and Sriram Lagoo. Tendulkar had a special insistence on casting Phule in the role of Hindurao Dhonde Patil. Following this, Jabbar Patel was appointed as the director.

== Biography ==
Hindurao Dhonde Patil, a prominent sugar baron in a village, known for his influence and wealth. His rise to power was marked by a relentless drive to modernize the village, establishing a sugar factory, poultry farms, and a school. However, this progress came at a cost, as he was willing to manipulate and control those around him to maintain his dominance. When a middle-aged penniless drunkard, referred to as "Master," arrived in the village, Hindurao grew suspicious, fearing that the man might be a government investigator. To monitor him, Hindurao invited Master to live in his mansion, all the while concealing his darker dealings. He had previously falsely implicated a military man, Maruti Kamble, in a scandal to protect his interests, ultimately leading to Kamble's murder. As the situation unfolded, Hindurao's facade began to crumble, especially when Master demanded an investigation into Kamble's disappearance. Facing mounting pressure and chaos within his enterprises, Hindurao attempted to divert attention with speeches but was met with public outcry. Ultimately, in a moment of confrontation, he surrendered to the police, meeting Master's gaze with a disarming smile, a subtle acknowledgment of the shifting power dynamics in the village.

== Reception ==
Shanta Gokhale of Scroll.in describes Hindurao Dhonde Patil as a complex antagonist who embodies the socio-political dynamics of 1970s rural Maharashtra. Maharashtra Times noted that the character displays deep emotional struggles and vulnerabilities. Prakash Dhule of Marathifilmdata.com opinioned that Hindurao Dhonde Patil represents a sophisticated character struggling with his conscience.

== Legacy ==
In 2013, Forbes India included this portrayal as one of the 25 greatest performances in Indian cinema. Loksatta points out the character reflects political behaviors and tendencies that remain relevant today.
