= Raosaheb =

Raosaheb can be a masculine given name or a middle name. Notable people with the name include:

== Given name ==
- Raosaheb Antapurkar (1958–2021), Indian politician
- Raosaheb Rangnath Borade (born 1940), Marathi author
- Raosaheb Danve (born 1955), Indian politician
- Raosaheb Gogte (1916–2000), Indian industrialist
- Raosaheb Nimbalkar (1915–1965), Indian first-class cricketer
- Raosaheb A. Patil, president of Dakshin Bharat Jain Sabha
- Raosaheb Ramrao Patil (1956–2015), Indian politician
- Raosaheb Shekhawat, Indian politician

== Middle name ==
- Dnyaneshwar Raosaheb Patil, Indian politician
- Ashok Raosaheb Pawar, Indian politician
