= Jait Re Jait =

- Poster
- Directed by: Jabbar Patel
- Written by: Satish Alekar; Anil Joglekar
- Based on: Jait re Jait by G. N. Dandekar
- Produced by: Usha Mangeshkar
- Starring: Mohan Agashe; Smita Patil; Nilu Phule
- Cinematography: Binod Pradhan
- Music by: Hridaynath Mangeshkar
- Distributed by: Mahalakshmi Chitra
- Release date: 9 November 1977
- Country: India
- Language: Marathi

Jait Re Jait (transl. Win, Win) is 1977 Indian Marathi-language musical film directed by Dr. Jabbar Patel and produced by Usha Mangeshkar and Hridaynath Mangeshkar, under the banner of Mahalakshmi Chitra. The film stars Mohan Agashe and Smita Patil in the lead roles. The film won President's silver medal for Best Feature Film in Marathi at the National Film Awards.

It is considered to be one of the greatest musical hits of all time in Marathi cinema. It is based on a book by G. N. Dandekar. Though the music achieved all-time hit status, the film was a box office disaster.

== Plot ==
Jait re jait is a story that revolves around Nagya, a thakar tribal drummer who develops a passion for being “punyavanta” [pious one] while growing up listening to his father. He desperately wants to see the “devimashi” [queen bee]. His father, during Negaya's childhood, piqued his interest in it unknowingly. Chindi, a girl who had left her husband because she deems him useless, falls madly in love with Nagya and becomes pregnant with his child. Once, when Nagya was cutting wood in the jungle, bees attacked him. Nagya seeks revenge and wants to kill them, especially the queen bee. However, the queen bee has some religious role in Nagya's tribe. Despite this, Nagya being stubborn, sets out to destroy the beehives with his wife. He does manage to destroy the hives, but in the process his wife gets killed. During the time Nagya is attacked by the bees, he does not play the drum. However, after destroying the hives, he restlessly picks up the drum and starts playing it like a mad man. He does not show any care for his dead wife. This is a classic paradox, where he succeeds (Jait re jait, means WIN-WIN) in his revenge, but loses his wife.

== Cast ==
- Mohan Agashe as Nagya
- Smita Patil as Chindhi
- Nilu Phule as Nagya's father
- Sulabha Deshpande as Nagya's mother
- Siddharth Ray as Young Nagya
- Narayan Pe
- Manjiri Paranjpae
- Meena Arjunwadkar
- Seema Dharmadhikari
- Shriram Ranade
- Chandrakant Kale
- Kamini
- Bal Karve
- Shriram Pendse
- Anant Kulkarni
- Dilip Mangalvedhekar
- Arvind Thakar

== Crew ==
- Story - G. N. Dandekar
- Dialogues - Satish Alekar and Anil Joglekar
- Playback - Lata Mangeshkar, Asha Bhosle, Usha Mangeshkar, Varsha Bhosle, Ravindra Sathe and Chandrakant Kale
- Art - Desai
- Colour - Nivrutri Dalvi
- Make Up - Suresh Basale
- Stills - Rao and Rao
- Assistants:

Music - Amar Direction - Prasad Subhedar and Shrinivas Bhange Camera - Rajan Kothari and Rajesh Joshi

- Director of Photography - Binod Pradhan
- Director - Dr. Jabbar Patel

== Production ==
The film's shooting began on 25 April 1977, and ended on 14 July 1977. Most of part was shot in the Karnala area near Panvel. The film was also shot on locations of Maharashtra in Khalapur, Kumbhavali and Thakarwadi in Raigad District. The titles appeared after 15 minutes after the start of the film and the popular song "Mee Raat Takli"—appeared after 50 minutes after the start of the film.

== Music ==
The popular songs of the film are composed by Pt. Hridaynath Mangeshkar, with most of the lyrics by N. D. Mahanor and performed by Lata Mangeshkar, Asha Bhosle, Usha Mangeshkar, Ravindra Sathe and Chandrakant Kale. Poet Arati Prabhu contributed to the lyrics of the song "Me Raat Takli".

All lyrics are written by N. D. Mahanor; all music is composed by Pt. Hridaynath Mangeshkar.

No.	Title	Singer(s)	Length
1.	"Gorya Dehavarti"	Usha Mangeshkar, Ravindra Sathe	03:58
2.	"Nabh Utaru Aala, Chimba Tharthar Valla"	Asha Bhosle	05:32
3.	"Jambhul Piklya Zaadakhali"	Asha Bhosle, Ravindra Sathe	04:03
4.	"Lingobacha Dongur"	Ravindra Sathe, Chandrakant Kale	01:23
5.	"Wadi Varlya Waata"		01:37
6.	"Ha Doliya"		02:45
7.	"Mee Raat Taakli, Me Kaat Taakli"	Lata Mangeshkar, Ravindra Sathe, Chandrakant Kale	04:30
8.	"Dongar Kathadi Thakarwadi"	Ravindra Sathe, Chandrakant Kale	01:48
9.	"Kunya Raajan Raajan"	Smita Patil, Asha Bhosle	02:32
10.	"Aamhi Thakar Thakar"	Ravindra Sathe, Chandrakant Kale	04:19
11.	"Pik Karpal"	Ravindra Sathe	04:01
12.	"Hee Dusryachi Baael"		02:40

== Awards ==
The songs from this film are popular in Maharashtra. The film earned actress Smita Patil and Jabbar Patel Filmfare Awards. Maharashtra State Film Awards for Best Direction was also presented to Patel. The 25th National Film Awards held in April 1978 honoured the film with President's silver medal for Best Feature Film in Marathi.

"Consistently transferring to the film medium a successful fictional work (Jait re Jait by G. N. Dandekar); for high lightening the mutual inconsistencies of love, of the fear of God and of superstition in a simple, innocent community of tribal, for the memorable use of the drum in evoking presence of the God and expressing the inexorable demands of love for a cinematic form which captures the lyricism, the cadence and the lilt of folk culture."
