= Gopal Nilkanth Dandekar =

Indian writer (1916–1988)

- Born: 8 July 1916; Paratwada, Amravati district, Maharashtra, India
- Died: 1 June 1998 (aged 81); Maharashtra, India
- Occupations: writer; novelist; biographer
- Spouse: Neera Dandekar
- Writing career
- Pen name: Appa Dandekar
- Language: Marathi
- Genres: Fiction; Historical novels; Biographies; Travelogues
- Notable works: Smaran Gatha; Shitu; Pavanakathacha Dhondi; Jait Re Jait
- Notable awards: Sahitya Akademi Award (1976); Honorary D.Litt. from Pune University (1992)

Gopal Nilkanth Dandekar aka Appa Dandekar (8 July 1916 – 1 June 1998) was a Marathi writer from Maharashtra, India.

== Awards and honors ==
In 1976, Dandekar received a Sahitya Akademi Award for his autobiographical work Smaran Gatha. He was elected president of Marathi Sahitya Sammelan held at Akola in 1981. He received an honorary D.Litt. degree from Pune University on 30 December 1992.

== Personal life ==
Dandekar and his wife Neera Dandekar have a daughter, Veena Dev. Veena has two daughters: Marathi actress Mrinal Kulkarni, and Madhura.

== Works ==
=== Autobiography ===
- Smaran Gatha

=== Novels ===
- Shitu
- Pavanakathacha Dhondi (1955)
- Padaghavli (Novel concerning a Brahmin family in coastal Maharashtra. It describes the lifestyle there in the 18th century.) (1956)
- Machivarala Budha (1958)
- Zunjar Machi
- Kuna Ekachi Bhramangatha
- Purnamaychi Lekare
- Ranbhuli
- Chhand Maze Vegle
- Tambadphuti
- Mrunmayi
- Aamhi Bhagirathache Putra (Novel based on the construction of Bhakra-Nangal dam on river Satlaj)
- Jait-Re-jait (A film based on this novel was later made by Jabbar Patel.)
- Baya Dar Ughad (Part 1 of 5 novels on Raja Shivaji's Maharashtra)
- Har Har Mahaadev (Part 2 of 5 novels on Raja Shivaji's Maharashtra)
- Daryabhavani (Part 3 of 5 novels on Raja Shivaji's Maharashtra)
- Zunzarmachi (Part 4 of 5 novels on Raja Shivaji's Maharashtra)
- He To Shrinchi Ichchha (Part 5 of 5 novels on Raja Shivaji's Maharashtra)
- Rumaalee Rahasya
- Tya Tithe Rukhatali
- Waagharu
- Karnaayan
- ShriRamayan
- Tudavalele Gharkul
- " Bhillaveer Kalinga" a historical story/novel on Tribes of Narmada Banks.
- Krishnawedh
- "Aai Chi Denagi" 8 volumes of motivational stories from Indian History for children

=== Travelogues ===
- Durga Bhramangatha (Concerning wanderings among the hill forts of Maharashtra)
- Durga Darshan (Concerning wanderings among the hill forts of Maharashtra)
- Kille (Informative book about trekking routes in Sahyadri)
- Maharashtra Darshan (Informative book about Maharashtra, especially the rural parts).
- Narmadechya Tataaki
- Dakshin Waara

=== Biographical works ===
- Mogara Phulala (Based on the life and works of Dnyaneshwar)
- Das Dongari Rahato (Based on the life and works of Ramdas Swami)
- Anandvan Bhuvani
- Tuka Akaashaaevdhaa (Novel based on the life and works of Tukaram)
- The Last Kirtan of Gadage Baba
- Waadalatil Deepstambh (Novel based on story of Keshav Baliram Hedgewar the founder of Rashtriya Swayamsevek Sangh)
- Devaki Nandan Gopaalaa
- "Shree gadge maharaj" (the biography of maharashtras saint -majestic prakashan-pablisher book )
