= D. B. Mokashi =

Indian Marathi-language writer (1915–1981)

Digambar Balkrishna Mokashi
- Born: 27 November 1915; Uran, Raigad district, Maharashtra, India
- Died: 29 June 1981 (aged 65); Pune, Maharashtra, India
- Occupations: Novelist, short story writer, translator
- Writing career
- Pen name: D. B. Mokashi (दि. बा. मोकाशी)
- Language: Marathi
- Notable works: Palkhi, Anand Owari, Dev Chalale
- Notable awards: Maharashtra State Outstanding Literary Work Award

Digambar Balkrishna Mokashi (27 November 1915 – 29 June 1981), popularly known as D. B. Mokashi, was an eminent Indian Marathi-language novelist, short story writer, and author. A prominent figure in the post-independence Marathi Navakatha (New Story) movement, his vast body of work includes novels, travelogues, fine essays (Lalit Lekhan), mystery and ghost stories, and children's literature.

Mokashi is best remembered for his iconic travelogue Palkhi (1964) and his acclaimed novels such as Anand Owari, Dev Chalale (1961), and Vatsyayan (1978). Several of his books were recognized with prestigious state literary awards.

== Early life and profession ==
Digambar Balkrishna Mokashi was born on 27 November 1915 in Uran, a coastal town in the Raigad district of Maharashtra, India. After completing his matriculation, Mokashi pursued technical education and obtained a diploma in engineering.

Following his education, Mokashi relocated to Pune, where he started and ran a radio repair business. Despite his technical profession, Mokashi's true inclination and passion always leaned toward literature, which eventually led him to become a full-time writer.

== Literary career ==
Mokashi's literary career spanned over three decades. While he was deeply rooted in realist storytelling based on daily life experiences, he also experimented with unconventional genres, including mystery stories (Rahasyakatha), ghost stories (Pishachchakatha), and suspense literature (Gudhkatha).

=== Short stories and the Navakatha movement ===
Mokashi made his literary debut in 1947 with the publication of the short story collection Laman Diwa. He quickly became recognized as a leading writer of the post-1960s Navakatha literary movement in Maharashtra. His stories vividly portrayed human relationships, isolation, and the complexities of middle-class life. His prolific output in this genre includes collections like Kathamohini (1959), Chaploos (1974), Pach Hajar Gayi (1975), Mauli (1976), and Tu Ani Mi (1977).

=== Novels ===
Mokashi authored several highly celebrated novels that critically examined history, spirituality, and changing Indian society:

- Anand Owari: A biographical and spiritual novel written from the perspective of 'Kanhoba', the younger brother of the revered Maharashtrian saint Tukaram.
- Dev Chalale (1961): Celebrated for its realistic portrayal of the changing rural landscape of the Konkan region and the collapse of the traditional joint family system.
- Other Notable Novels: Purushas Shambhar Gunhe Maaf (1971), Sthal-Yatra (1958), and Vatsyayan (1978).

=== Travelogues and fine essays ===
His non-fiction, travel, and essay-based writings are considered masterpieces of Marathi literature.

- Palkhi (1964): An unparalleled sociological and cultural documentation of the annual Warkari pilgrimage, which Mokashi undertook on foot alongside the palanquin of Sant Dnyaneshwar. It was later translated into English by the State University of New York Press (SUNY).
- Fine Essays (Lalit Lekhan): He contributed significantly to this genre with essay collections based on his observations of life, including Athara Laksh Pavale (1971), Amrutanubhav, and Sandhyakalche Pune (1980).

=== Translations and children's literature ===
Mokashi was an active participant in an important translation project initiated by the 'American Library'. Through this initiative, he translated major Western works into Marathi, including Ernest Hemingway's For Whom the Bell Tolls (as Ghanaghanto Ghantanad) and a historical account of the Battle of Plassey (as Plasicha Ransangram).

Mokashi also made substantial contributions to children's literature, penning books like Zamin Apli Ai (1966), Andhar Dari, and Yantra Ani Tantra.

== Awards and honors ==
Mokashi's contribution to Marathi literature was formally recognized by the Government of Maharashtra. He was awarded the prestigious Outstanding Literary Work Award (Utkrusht Sahityakruti Puraskar) by the Maharashtra State Government for the following six books:

- Gupit
- Palkhi
- Sthal-Yatra
- Amod Sunasi Ale
- Dev Chalale
- Zamin Apli Ai

== Death and legacy ==
Mokashi passed away on 29 June 1981 in Pune, Maharashtra, at the age of 65. The year 2014–2015 was celebrated in the Marathi literary community as his birth centenary year, honoring his lasting legacy in Maharashtrian culture.
