= Mukta (film) =

- Directed by: Jabbar Patel
- Produced by: Ashok Mhatre
- Starring: Sonali Kulkarni; Vikram Gokhale; Shreeram Lagoo; Reema Lagoo
- Cinematography: Shankar Bardhan
- Music by: Anand Modak
- Release date: 1994
- Running time: 154 min
- Country: India
- Language: Marathi

Mukta is a 1994 Marathi film directed by Jabbar Patel. The film stars Shreeram Lagoo, Sonali Kulkarni, Reema Lagoo and Vikram Gokhale in lead roles. Mukta won the 1994 National Award for Best Feature Film on National Integration. It is considered one of the important Marathi films for the period 1993–98.

== Plot ==
Daughter of a Marathi poet settled in United States, Mukta returns to her ancestral home when she gets a post-graduate scholarship to study sociology. She lives with her grandfather, Abasaheb Kanase-Patil, a veteran of Maharashtra's co-operative movement. At the university she joins a street theatre group of Dalit activists and is drawn to the group's leader Milind Wagh, a fearless student leader and poet. Family's unease increases when her friend from America Julian arrives. Julian, however, wins over her grandfather accompanying him to a pilgrimage to Pandharpur. The old man recalling Marathi Saint poets’ struggle against caste inequalities is complemented by Julian singing songs associated with the struggle against racial discrimination in the US.

== Cast ==
The cast is as follows:

- Sonali Kulkarni as Mukta Kansepatil
- Shriram Lagoo as Aabasaheb Kansepatil; Mukta's grandfather
- Vikram Gokhale as Eknath Kansepatil, Mukta father
- Vandana Pandit as Yashoda Kansepatil; Mukta's mother
- Avinash Narkar as Milind Wagh, Social Activist
- Reema Lagoo as Rukmini
- Caleb Obura Obwatinyka as Julian; Mukta's African-American friend
- Madhu Kambikar as Chandrabhaga Ghorpade
- Prashant Subedar as Prithviraj
- Chandrakant Kale as Paranjape
- Upendra Limaye as Upendra
- Sharad Bhutadiya as Digvijay Ghorpade

== Music ==
- "Valan Vatatl Ya" - Ravindra Sathe
- "Jaai Juicha Gandh Matila" - Jayshree Shivram
- "Raktaat" (Poetry) - Avinash Narkar
- "Eliza Eliza" - Clinton Cerejo
- "Vidyasangeet" (part 1) - Anand Modak
- "Too Talam" - Prabhanjan Marathe
- "Vidyasangeet" (part 2) - Anand Modak
- "Panyas" (Poetry) - Sonali Kulkarni
- "I Came" - Clinton Cerejo
- "Tya Maziya" - Ravindra Sathe

== Awards ==
- 42nd National Film Awards - National Award for Best Feature Film on National Integration
- Maharashtra State Film Awards - Best Music Director - Anand Modak
- Maharashtra State Film Awards - Best Actor - Avinash Narkar
- Maharashtra State Film Awards - Maharashtra State Film Award for Best Film
