= Bhalchandra Vaman Kelkar =

- Born: September 23, 1920
- Died: November 6, 1987 (aged 67)
- Other names: Bhalba Kelkar
- Known for: Marathi Literature and Theater

Bhalchandra Vaman Kelkar (September 23, 1920 – November 6, 1987) was a Marathi writer and actor, from Maharashtra, India. He was one of the founders of Progressive Dramatic Association in Pune.

Bhalba Kelkar was also known for writing biographies of Indian scientists for children.
