= Jabbar Patel =

Indian film director & former paediatrician (born 1942)

Dr. Jabbar Patel
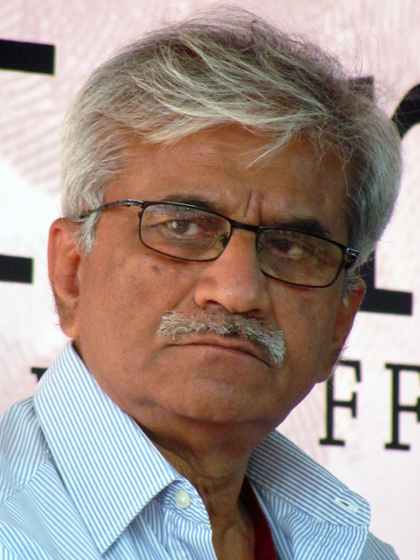
- Patel in December 2010
- Born: 23 June 1942 (age 84); Pandharpur, Bombay state, British India (Present day Maharashtra, India)
- Occupations: Theatre; film director
- Years active: 1973–present
- Honours: Padma Shri (1982); Sangeet Natak Akademi Award; V. Shantaram Award

Dr. Jabbar Patel (born 23 June 1942) is a former paediatrician and a Marathi-language theatre and film director of India. His production of Vijay Tendulkar's play Ghashiram Kotwal, in 1973 is considered a classic in Modern Indian Theatre. He has received several accolades, including seven National Film Awards, eight Maharashtra State Film Awards, seven Filmfare Awards Marathi. Patel received Filmfare Marathi Lifetime Achievement Award at 7th Filmfare Awards Marathi. He was awarded Sangeet Natak Akademi Award in 1978. In 2005, he was honoured with the V. Shantaram Award, Maharashtra's highest award in the field of cinema. In 1982, he was honoured by the Government of India with the Padma Shri, the fourth-highest civilian honour of the country.

He is the maker of classics films in Marathi cinema, like, Samna, Jait Re Jait (Mohan Agashe, Smita Patil), Umbartha (Smita Patil, Girish Karnad), Sinhasan (Nana Patekar, Shriram Lagoo, Reema Lagoo) Some of his other films are, Mukta, Ek Hota Vidushak, and Musafir (Hindi). His most acclaimed film is Dr. Babasaheb Ambedkar released in 1999. He won the 1995 Nargis Dutt Award for Best Feature Film on National Integration for his Marathi film, Mukta.

== Personal life ==
Patel was born in 1942 in Pandharpur in present day Indian state of Maharashtra. While growing up, his family was the only Muslim family in a Hindu-Brahmin neighbourhood of Solapur. His father was employed in Indian Railways. He obtained his early school education in Haribhai Deokaran High school Solapur. He qualified as a doctor, specialising in paediatric medicine from B. J. Medical College in Pune. He and his wife, a gynecologist ran a clinic in Daund near Pune. The couple have two daughters.

== Career ==
Patel started acting while in elementary school. In Solapur, he lived with Shriram Pujari, who was an influential personality in that city. Staying at his home, Jabbar Patel was able to take a closer look at the people from Marathi theatre world who used to stay at the Pujari residence. The roles he played in his high school play Chaphekar, in the silent drama, Hadacha Zunzar Aahes Tu, as well of Shyam in Tujha Aahe Tujpashi while in college were appreciated.

Patel started his career with the Marathi experimental theatre group, Progressive Dramatic association (PDA) founded by Bhalba Kelkar. In PDA produced plays, he acted as well as directed. He directed Vijay tendulkar's Ashi Pakhare Yeti for PDA which was a great commercial success. In 1972, Patel and colleagues such as Mohan Agashe, and Satish Alekar broke away from PDA over differences on staging their new production, Ghashiram Kotwal written by Vijay Tendulkar. They formed a new group called Theatre Academy. After Ghashiram Kotwal, the group produced Teen Paishacha Tamasha, an adaptation of Brecht's Threepenny Opera in 1974.

He wrote the lyrics of the song "Raya Asa Zombu Naka Angala" from the film Samna. He has worked on the film based on the life and work of Santoor maestro Pandit Shivkumar Sharma.

For Jabbar Patel, tackling a political subject is not something new. Whether it was Umbartha, Jait Re Jait, or Sinhasan for the silver screen, or Ghashiram Kotwal for the stage, he has handled political subjects. His recent film is also political based "Yashwantrao Chavan: Bakhar Eka Vaadalaachi".

Jait Re Jait (1977) is a musical milestone in the history of Indian cinema, and expresses the stories of a forgotten tribe through dance and a total of 19 songs. Next came Sinhasan (1981) made in a montage style with 35 characters, both won the National Awards. One of Patel’s most acclaimed works is Umbartha (1981), a film featuring Smita Patil as the superintendent of a woman’s reform home.

== Filmography ==
Year	Title	Director	Producer	Notes
1974	Samna	Yes		Debut film
1977	Jait Re Jait	Yes		National Film Award for Best Marathi Feature Film
1979	Sinhasan	Yes	Yes	Maharashtra State Film Award for Best Film
1982	Umbartha	Yes	Yes	National Film Award for Best Marathi Feature Film, Filmfare Award for Best Film – Marathi
1986	Musafir	Yes	Yes	
1986	Maharashtra	Yes	Yes	Documentary film
1987	Mi SM	Yes	Yes	Documentary film
1988	Pathik	Yes	Yes	Documentary film
1989	Laxman Joshi	Yes	Yes	Documentary film
1990	Forts of Maharashtra	Yes	Yes	Documentary film
1990	Indian Theatre	Yes	Yes	Documentary film
1991	Dr. Babasaheb Ambedkar	Yes	Yes	Documentary film
1992	Ek Hota Vidushak	Yes		National Film Award for Best Marathi Feature Film
1994	Mukta	Yes		Nargis Dutt Award for Best Feature Film on National Integration
2000	Dr. Babasaheb Ambedkar	Yes		
2006	Hans Akela - Kumar Gandharva	Yes		National Film Award for Best Biographical Film
2006	Teesri Azadi	Yes		
2007	Antardhwani: Pandit Shiv Kumar Sharma	Yes		
2014	Yashwantrao Chavan: Bakhar Eka Vaadalaachi	Yes	Yes	

== Awards ==
=== National Film Awards ===
- Samna
- Jait Re Jait
- Sinhasan
- Umbartha
- Ek Hota Vidushak
- Mukta
- Hans Akela - Kumar Gandharva

=== Maharashtra State Film Awards ===
- Samna
- Jait Re Jait
- Sinhasan
- Umbartha
- Ek Hota Vidushak
- Mukta

=== Filmfare Awards Marathi ===
- Samna
- Jait Re Jait
- Sinhasan
- Umbartha

== Festival circuit ==
Jabbar Patel is the chairman of the Pune Film Foundation, and the festival director of the Pune International Film Festival. First Edition of PIFF was started in year 2002 and has been running annually.
