= Datta Davjekar =

Indian composer

Dattatreya Shankar Davjekar (15 November 1917 – 19 September 2007), better known as Datta Davjekar or Datta Daujeker (Marathi: दत्ता डावजेकर), was a veteran music composer mainly associated with Marathi and Hindi movies. He is credited with giving a break to many singers who later became extremely popular, including the Mangeshkar siblings, Lata Mangeshkar, Asha Bhosale and Usha Mangeshkar as well as others such as Anuradha Paudwal.

== Career ==
Datta Davjekar's father Baburao used to play tabla for live folk musical plays as well as in Urdu plays. Davjekar learned how to play tabla and harmonium and thus developed an interest in music. He also started composing songs. Later, he was invited by the famous star Shanta Apte to perform on her shows. Davjekar performed at places as far off as Allahabad and Lahore.

Davjekar assisted C. Ramachandra and Chitragupta for a while. His first break came in 1941 with a Marathi film called Municipality. It was followed by Sarkari Pahune in 1942. One of the film's songs Naache Sangeet Natwar was a big hit. Davjekar went on to work with big names in Marathi cinema, like Raja Paranjape, Gajanan Jagirdar, Master Vinayak, Dinkar Patil, Datta Dharmadhikari, Rajdutt and Raja Thakur.

His famous films include Rangalyaa Raatri Ashyaa, Paathlaag, Pahu Re Kitni Vaat, Thoraataanchi Kamlaa, Padchaaya, Chimanrao Gundyabhau, Pedgaonche Shahane, Juna Te Sona, Sant Vahate Krishna Mai, Sukhaachi Sawali, Viasakh Vanwaa and Yashoda. His last film release was Pahaate Punyechi in 1992. His non-film song "Sainik Ho Tumchyaa Saathi" (translation: For you, oh Soldiers) was a big hit and its sales proceeds went to the Armed Forces.

In a career spanning fifty two years, Davjekar composed music in several languages for sixty films, twelve plays and several documentaries. He learnt German music for composing music for the play Thank you, Mr Glad.

=== Introducing Lata Mangeshkar ===
The film Maazhe Baal, released in 1943, was Davjekar's first Marathi film with Lata Mangeshkar. He went on to introduce her to Hindi films with his song Paa Laagoo Kar Jori Re for the film Aap Ki Sewa Mein (1947).

=== Introducing Sudha Malhotra ===
Davjekar did two more Hindi films, Vasant Joglekar's Aap Ki Adalat and Prem Nath's English-Hindi bilingual, Prisoner of Golconda, in which he introduced Sudha Malhotra.

== Death ==
On 19 September 2007 Davjekar died of a heart attack at his residence in Andheri, Mumbai.
