= List of Marathi films =

This is the list of films produced in the Marathi language in India. Ayodhyecha Raja was the first talkie Marathi film that released in 1932.

== 1910 to 1919 ==
- List of Marathi films of 1910-1919

== 1920 to 1929 ==
- List of Marathi films of 1920
- List of Marathi films of 1921
- List of Marathi films of 1922
- List of Marathi films of 1923
- List of Marathi films of 1924
- List of Marathi films of 1925
- List of Marathi films of 1926
- List of Marathi films of 1927
- List of Marathi films of 1928
- List of Marathi films of 1929

== 1930 to 1939 ==
- List of Marathi films of 1930
- List of Marathi films of 1931
- List of Marathi films of 1932
- List of Marathi films of 1933
- List of Marathi films of 1934
- List of Marathi films of 1935
- List of Marathi films of 1936
- List of Marathi films of 1937
- List of Marathi films of 1938
- List of Marathi films of 1939

== 1940 to 1949 ==
- List of Marathi films of 1940
- List of Marathi films of 1941
- List of Marathi films of 1942
- List of Marathi films of 1943
- List of Marathi films of 1944
- List of Marathi films of 1945
- List of Marathi films of 1946
- List of Marathi films of 1947
- List of Marathi films of 1948
- List of Marathi films of 1949

== 1950 to 1959 ==
- List of Marathi films of 1950
- List of Marathi films of 1951
- List of Marathi films of 1952
- List of Marathi films of 1953
- List of Marathi films of 1954
- List of Marathi films of 1955
- List of Marathi films of 1956
- List of Marathi films of 1957
- List of Marathi films of 1958
- List of Marathi films of 1959

== 1960 to 1969 ==
- List of Marathi films of 1960
- List of Marathi films of 1961
- List of Marathi films of 1962
- List of Marathi films of 1963
- List of Marathi films of 1964
- List of Marathi films of 1965
- List of Marathi films of 1966
- List of Marathi films of 1967
- List of Marathi films of 1968
- List of Marathi films of 1969

== 1970 to 1979 ==
- List of Marathi films of 1970
- List of Marathi films of 1971
- List of Marathi films of 1972
- List of Marathi films of 1973
- List of Marathi films of 1974
- List of Marathi films of 1975
- List of Marathi films of 1976
- List of Marathi films of 1977
- List of Marathi films of 1978
- List of Marathi films of 1979

== 1980 to 1989 ==
- List of Marathi films of 1980
- List of Marathi films of 1981
- List of Marathi films of 1982
- List of Marathi films of 1983
- List of Marathi films of 1984
- List of Marathi films of 1985
- List of Marathi films of 1986
- List of Marathi films of 1987
- List of Marathi films of 1988
- List of Marathi films of 1989

== 1990 to 1999 ==
- List of Marathi films of 1990
- List of Marathi films of 1991
- List of Marathi films of 1992
- List of Marathi films of 1993
- List of Marathi films of 1994
- List of Marathi films of 1995
- List of Marathi films of 1996
- List of Marathi films of 1997
- List of Marathi films of 1998
- List of Marathi films of 1999

== 2000 to 2009 ==
- List of Marathi films of 2000
- List of Marathi films of 2001
- List of Marathi films of 2002
- List of Marathi films of 2003
- List of Marathi films of 2004
- List of Marathi films of 2005
- List of Marathi films of 2006
- List of Marathi films of 2007
- List of Marathi films of 2008
- List of Marathi films of 2009
- List of Marathi films of 2010

== 2010 to 2019 ==
- List of Marathi films of 2010
- List of Marathi films of 2011
- List of Marathi films of 2012
- List of Marathi films of 2013
- List of Marathi films of 2014
- List of Marathi films of 2015
- List of Marathi films of 2016
- List of Marathi films of 2017
- List of Marathi films of 2018
- List of Marathi films of 2019

== 2020 to present ==
- List of Marathi films of 2020
- List of Marathi films of 2021
- List of Marathi films of 2022
- List of Marathi films of 2023
- List of Marathi films of 2024
- List of Marathi films of 2025
- List of Marathi films of 2026
