= List of highest-grossing Marathi films =

Marathi cinema is the filmmaking industry mainly based in Mumbai, Kolhapur, Pune & other regions of Maharashtra. The 1988 film Ashi Hi Banwa Banwi was the first Marathi film to cross ₹1 crore. The 1992 film Maherchi Sadi was the first Marathi film to cross ₹10 crores. Me Shivajiraje Bhosale Boltoy is a first Marathi film grossed over ₹25 crore at the box office. Natsamrat was the first Marathi film to cross ₹50 crores. (Note: Natsamrat's reported worldwide grosses vary between ₹48 crore (The Indian Express, Maharashtra Times) – ₹50 crore (DNA India, The Hindu)) Sairat was the first Marathi film to cross ₹100 crores. Raja Shivaji was the first Marathi film to cross ₹100 crore net at the box office. This ranking lists the highest-grossing Marathi films produced by Marathi cinema, based on conservative global box office estimates as reported by organizations classified as green by Wikipedia. (Note: See WP:RSP, WP:ICTFSOURCES) The figures are not adjusted for inflation. However, there is no official tracking of figures, and sources publishing data are frequently pressured to increase their estimates.

== Key ==
Background shading indicates that a film, or at least one from a series, is currently showing in theatres worldwide.

== Highest-grossing films ==
The top 25 highest-grossing films worldwide are listed here.

Rank (Note: Sorted based on the lowest value when figures are presented as a range, and for the same value, the older item is given a higher order.)	Title	Worldwide gross	Year	Ref.
1	Raja Shivaji (Note: The film was produced in Marathi and Hindi simultaneously.)	₹130 crore	2026	
2	Sairat	₹110 crore	2016	
3	Deool Band 2	₹100.50 crore	2026	
4	Baipan Bhaari Deva	₹92 crore	2023	
5	Sachin: A Billion Dreams (Note: The film was produced in Marathi, Hindi and English, according to the filmmakers.)	₹76.86 crore	2017	
6	Ved	₹75 crore	2022	
6	Pawankhind	₹75 crore	2022	
8	Natsamrat	₹48–50 crore	2016	
9	Lai Bhaari	₹41 crore	2014	
10	Katyar Kaljat Ghusali	₹40 crore	2015	
11	Dagadi Chawl	₹37 crore	2015	
12	Timepass	₹33 crore	2014	
13	Krantijyoti Vidyalay Marathi Madhyam	₹32 crore	2026	
13	Duniyadari	₹32 crore	2013	
15	Thackeray (Note: The film was produced in both the Marathi and Hindi languages, according to the filmmakers.)	₹31.60 crore	2019	
16	Timepass 2	₹30 crore	2015	
17	Dashavatar	₹28–30 crore	2025	
18	Nach Ga Ghuma	₹27 crore	2024	
19	Mauli	₹26.13 crore	2018	
20	Dharmaveer	₹26 crore	2022	
21	Ventilator	₹25 crore	2016	
21	Me Shivajiraje Bhosale Boltoy	₹25 crore	2009	
21	Aapla Manus	₹25 crore	2018	
21	Navra Maza Navsacha 2	₹25 crore	2024	
25	Naal	₹24 crore	2018	

== Highest-grossing films by domestic net collection ==
Rank	Title	Net collection	Year	Ref.
1	Raja Shivaji	₹105.68 crore	2026	
2	Sairat	₹90 crore	2016	
3	Baipan Bhari Deva	₹76.28 crore	2023	
4	Deool Band 2	₹73.66 crore	2026	
5	Ved	₹61.20 crore	2022	
6	Natsamrat	₹42 crore	2016	
7	Pawankhind	₹37.72 crore	2022	
8	Lai Bhaari	₹37 crore	2014	
9	Katyar Kaljat Ghusali	₹35 crore	2015	
10	Thackeray	₹31.60 crore	2019	

== Highest-grossing films by opening day ==
Rank	Title	Worldwide gross	Year	Ref.
1	Raja Shivaji	₹13.51 crore	2026	
2	Sairat	₹4.23 crore	2016	
3	Timepass 2	₹3.75 crore	2015	
4	Ved	₹3.5 crore	2022	
5	Natsamrat	₹3.5 crore	2016	
6	Lai Bhaari	₹3.10 crore	2014	
7	Mauli	₹3.1 crore	2018	
8	Deool Band 2	₹2.91–3 crore	2026	
9	Har Har Mahadev	₹2.25 crore	2022	
10	Navra Maza Navsacha 2	₹2.25 crore	2024	

== Highest-grossing films by opening weekend ==
Rank	Title	Worldwide gross	Year	Ref.
1	Raja Shivaji	₹43.66 crore	2026	
2	Deool Band 2	₹18.59 crore	2026	
3	Sairat	₹12.20 crore	2016	
4	Timepass 2	₹11 crore	2015	
4	Mauli	₹11 crore	2018	
5	Lai Bhaari	₹10.55 crore	2014	
6	Natsamrat	₹10 crore	2016	
7	Ved	₹10 crore	2022	
8	Dharmaveer	₹9.08 crore	2022	
9	Sarsenapati Hambirrao	₹8.71 crore	2022	
10	Dharmaveer 2	₹7.92 crore	2024	

== Highest-grossing films by opening week ==
Rank	Title	Worldwide gross	Year	Ref.
1	Raja Shivaji	₹62.40 crore	2026	
2	Deool Band 2	₹30 crore	2026	
3	Sairat	₹25.50 crore	2016	
4	Ved	₹20.18 crore	2022	
5	Lai Bhaari	₹17.10 crore	2014	
6	Natsamrat	₹16.50 crore	2016	
7	Navra Maza Navsacha 2	₹14.36 crore	2024	
8	Naal	₹14 crore	2018	
9	Dharmaveer	₹13.87 crore	2022	
10	Baipan Bhari Deva	₹12.50 crore	2023	

== Highest-grossing films by month ==
Month	Title	Worldwide gross	Year	Ref.
January	Natsamrat	₹48–50 crore	2016	
February	Pawankhind	₹75 crore	2022	
March	Baban	₹15 crore	2018	
April	Sairat	₹110 crore	2016	
May	Raja Shivaji	₹130 crore	2026	
June	Baipan Bhari Deva	₹92 crore	2023	
July	Lai Bhaari	₹40 crore	2014	
August	Subhedar	₹18 crore	2023	
September	Dashavatar	₹28–30 crore	2025	
October	Dagadi Chawl	₹37 crore	2015	
November	Katyar Kaljat Ghusali	₹40 crore	2015	
December	Ved	₹75 crore	2022	

== Highest-grossing milestone films ==
Year	Film	Worldwide gross	Ref.
1972	Pinjara	₹90 lakh	
1988	Ashi Hi Banwa Banwi	₹3 crore	First to cross ₹1 crore
1991	Maherchi Sadi	₹12 crore	First to cross ₹10 crore
2009	Me Shivajiraje Bhosale Boltoy	₹25 crore	First to cross ₹25 crore
2013	Duniyadari	₹30 crore	
2014	Lai Bhaari	₹40 crore	
2016	Natsamrat	₹48–50 crore	First to cross ₹50 crore
2016	Sairat	₹110 crore	First to cross ₹100 crore
2026	Raja Shivaji	₹130 crore	Fastest ₹100 crore grosser and first to cross ₹130 crore

== Highest-grossing single-day films ==
Rank	Title	Collection	Ref.
1	Raja Shivaji	₹14.75 crore	
2	Deool Band 2	₹7 crore	
3	Baipan Bhari Deva	₹6.10 crore	
4	Ved	₹5.70 crore	
5	Sairat	₹4.61–4.85 crore	

== Highest-grossing films by year ==
Year	Title	Studio	Director	Ref.
1930	Udaykal	Prabhat Film Company	V. Shantaram	
1931	Chandrasena	Prabhat Film Company	V. Shantaram, Keshavrao Dhaiber	
1932	Shyam Sundar	Dadasaheb Torne	Bhalji Pendharkar	
1934	Amrit Manthan	Prabhat Film Company	V. Shantaram	
1936	Sant Tukaram	Prabhat Film Company	Vishnupant Govind Damle, Sheikh Fatelal	
1937	Kunku	Prabhat Film Company	V. Shantaram	
1938	Brahmachari	Hans Pictures	Master Vinayak	
1939	Manoos	Prabhat Film Company	V. Shantaram	
1940	Sant Dnyaneshwar	Prabhat Film Company	Vishnupant Govind Damle, Sheikh Fatelal	
1941	Shejari	Prabhat Film Company	V. Shantaram	
1942	Bharat Bhet	Prakash Pictures	Vijay Bhatt	
1943	Ram Rajya	Prakash Pictures	Vijay Bhatt	
1944	Ramshastri	Prabhat Film Company	Gajanan Jagirdar	
1945	Only Two Films Released			
1946	Only Two Films Released			
1947	Lokshahir Ram Joshi	Rajkamal Kalamandir	Baburao Painter, V. Shantaram	
1948	Jivacha Sakha	Mangal Pictures	Raja Paranjape	
1949	Meeth Bhakar	Prabhakar Pictures	Bhalji Pendharkar	
1950	Ram Ram Pahuna	Uday Kala Chitra	Dinkar D. Patil	
1951	Amar Bhoopali	Rajkamal Kalamandir	V. Shantaram	
1952	Lakhachi Gosht	Gajraj Chitra	Raja Paranjape	
1953	Vahininchya Bangdya	Chitrasahkar	Shantaram Athavale	
1954	Maharani Yesubai	Prabhakar Pictures	Bhalji Pendharkar	
1955	Shevgyachya Shenga	Sadashiv Chitra	Shantaram Athavale	
1956	Pasant Aahe Mulgi	Mangal Pictures	Raja Paranjape	
1957	Zakli Mooth	P.R. Productions	Anant Mane	
1958	Don Ghadicha Daav	Shrikrishna Productions	Anant Mane	
1959	Sangtye Aika	Chetana Chitra	Anant Mane	
1960	Kanyadaan	Surel Chitra	Madhav Shinde	
1961	Manini	Kala Chitra	Anant Mane	
1962	Rangalya Ratri Asha	The Maharashtra Film Industrial Cooperative Society	Raja Thakur	
1963	Molkarin	Surangi Chitra	Yashwant Pethkar	
1964	Sawaal Majha Aika!	Chetana Chitra	Anant Mane	
1965	Sadhi Mansa	Gayatri Chitra	Bhalji Pendharkar	
1966	Kela Ishara Jata Jata	Mahalakshmi Chitra	Anant Mane	
1967	Thamb Laxmi Kunku Lavate	Shakari Film Studio Ltd.	Datta Dharmadhikari	
1968	Aamhi Jato Amuchya Gava	Prem Chitra	Kamalakar Torne	
1969	Aparadh	Manorama Films	Rajdutt	
1970	Mumbaicha Jawai	Parijat Chitra	Raja Thakur	
1971	Songadya	Sadichha Chitra	Dada Kondke	
1972	Pinjara	Rajkamal Kalamandir	V. Shantaram	
1973	Andhala Marto Dola	Sadichha Chitra	Dada Kondke	
1974	Sugandhi Katta	Chitra Mauli	Vasant Painter	
1975	Pandu Havaldar	Sadichha Chitra	Dada Kondke	
1976	Tumcha Aamcha Jamala	Sadichha Chitra	Dada Kondke	
1977	Ram Ram Gangaram	Dada Kondke Productions	Dada Kondke	
1978	Bot Lavin Tithe Gudgulya	Sadichha Chitra	Dada Kondke	
1979	Ashtavinayak	Manorama Films	Rajdutt	
1980	Hyoch Navra Pahije	Dada Kondke Productions	Dada Kondke	
1981	Gondhalat Gondhal	Smita Arts	V. K. Naik	
1982	Aali Angavar	Sadichha Chitra	Dada Kondke	
1983	Gupchup Gupchup	Shivshakti Productions	V. K. Naik	
1984	Mumbaicha Faujdar	Manohari Chitra	Rajdutt	
1985	Dhum Dhadaka	Jenma Films International	Mahesh Kothare	
1986	Gadbad Ghotala	Eagle International Enterprises	Raja Bargir	
1987	Gammat Jammat	Shree Tulsi Productions	Sachin Pilgaonkar	
1988	Ashi Hi Banwa Banwi	V. Shantaram Productions	Sachin Pilgaonkar	
1989	Thartharat	Shree Ashtavinayak Chitra	Mahesh Kothare	
1990	Dhadakebaaz	Jenma Films International	Mahesh Kothare	
1991	Maherchi Sadi	Jyoti Pictures	Vijay Kondke	
1992	Shubh Mangal Savdhan	Amar Productions	M. S. Salvi	
1993	Zapatlela	Jenma Films International	Mahesh Kothare	
1994	Sasarche Dhotar	Vishwas Anil	Dada Kondke	
1995	Aai	Ashwami Films	Mahesh Manjrekar	
1996	Putravati	Manasi Chitra	Bhaskar Jadhav	
1997	Paij Lagnachi	J. K. Films	Yashwant Bhalkar	
1998	Tu Tithe Mee	Asmita Chitra	Sanjay Surkar	
1999	Bindhaast	Matchindra Chate	Chandrakant Kulkarni	
2000	Astitva	Friends India; Satyashwami Entertainment Ltd.	Mahesh Manjrekar	
2001	Chimani Pakhar	Devyani Movies	Mahesh Kothare	
2002	Dahavi Fa	Vichitra Nirmiti Productions; Everest Entertainment	Sumitra Bhave–Sunil Sukthankar	
2003	Shwaas	Universal/Universal Int	Sandeep Sawant	
2004	Pachhadlela	Jenma Films International	Mahesh Kothare	
2005	Khabardar	Jenma Films International	Mahesh Kothare	
2006	Jatra: Hyalagaad Re Tyalagaad	Sri Sai Productions	Kedar Shinde	
2007	Saade Maade Teen	Anubhuti Art	Ankush Chaudhari, Sachit Patil	
2008	De Dhakka	Satya Films; Zee Talkies	Atul Kale, Sudesh Manjrekar	
2009	Me Shivajiraje Bhosale Boltoy	Sanjay Chhabria; Ashwami Manjrekar	Santosh Manjrekar	
2010	Natarang	Zee Talkies; Nikhil Sane; Amit Phalke; Meghana Jadhav	Ravi Jadhav	
2011	Balgandharva	Iconic Chandrakant Productions Pvt. Ltd.	Ravi Jadhav	
2012	Kaksparsh	Great Maratha Entertainments; L.L.P	Mahesh Manjrekar	
2013	Duniyadari	Dreaming 24/7 Productions; Deepak Rane	Sanjay Jadhav	
2014	Lai Bhaari	Mumbai Film Company; Cinemantra Production	Nishikant Kamat	
2015	Katyar Kaljat Ghusali	Essel Vision Productions; Ganesh Films; Nitin Keni Creations	Subodh Bhave	
2016	Sairat	Zee Studios; Aatpat Production; Essel Vision Productions	Nagraj Manjule	
2017	Sachin: A Billion Dreams	200 NotOut Productions; Carnival Motion Pictures	James Erskine	
2018	Naal	Zee Studios; Aatpat Production; Mrudganda Films	Sudhakar Reddy Yakkanti	
2019	Thackeray	Viacom 18 Motion Pictures; Raut'ers Entertainment; Carnival Motion Pictures	Abhijit Panse	
2020	Dhurala	Zee Studios; Pratisaad Production	Sameer Vidwans	
2021	Jhimma	Chalchitra Company; Crazy Few Films	Hemant Dhome	
2022	Ved	Mumbai Film Company	Riteish Deshmukh	
2023	Baipan Bhaari Deva	Jio Studios; EmVeeBee Media	Kedar Shinde	
2024	Nach Ga Ghuma	Hiranyagarbha Manoranjan; Panorama Studios	Paresh Mokashi	
2025	Dashavatar	Ocean Film Company; Ocean Art House	Subodh Khanolkar	
2026	Raja Shivaji	Mumbai Film Company; Jio Studios	Riteish Deshmukh	

== See also ==
- List of highest-grossing Indian films
  - List of highest-grossing Hindi films
  - List of highest-grossing Indian Bengali films
  - List of highest-grossing Punjabi-language films
  - List of highest-grossing South Indian films
    - List of highest-grossing Kannada films
    - List of highest-grossing Malayalam films
    - List of highest-grossing Tamil films
    - List of highest-grossing Telugu films
- List of highest-grossing films in India
