= List of Marathi films of 1961 =

A list of films produced by the Marathi language film industry based in Maharashtra in the year 1961.

== 1961 Releases ==
A list of Marathi films released in 1961.

Year	Film	Director	Cast	Release Date	Notes	Source
1961	Aadhi Kalas Mag Paaya	Raja Paranjpe				
1961	Manini	Anant Mane	Jayshree Gadkar, Chandrakant Gokhale, Hansa Wadkar		Certificate of Merit for National Film Award for Best Feature Film in Marathi	
1961	Manasala Pankh Astaat	Madhav Shinde			Certificate of Merit for National Film Award for Third Best Feature Film in Marathi	
1961	Prapanch	Madhukar Pathak	Sulochana Latkar, Amar Shiekh, Kusum Deshpande		Won the Golden Lotus Award (Swarna Kamal) for Best Film at the National Film Awards {All India Certificate of Merit for the Third Best Feature Film}	
1961	Vaijayanta	Gajanan Jagirdar	Jayshree Gadkar, Suryakant		Certificate of Merit for National Film Award for Second Best Feature Film in Marathi	
1961	Majhi Aai	Dinkar Patil	Seema Deo, Ramesh Deo, Dada Salvi			
1961	Ek Dhaaga Sukhacha	Datta Dharmadhikari	Raja Paranjape, Seema Deo			
1961	Kalank Shobha	Datta Dharmadhikari	Suryakant, Vivek, Chitaranjan Kolhatkar			
1961	Rang Panchami	Anant Mane				
1961	Bolaki Bahuli	Raja Bargir				
1961	Shahir Parshuram	Anant Mane				
1961	Suvashini	Raja Paranjpe				
