= List of Marathi films of 1960 =

Films in the Marathi language

A list of films produced by the Marathi language film industry based in Maharashtra in the year 1960.

== 1960 Releases ==
A list of Marathi films released in 1960.

Year	Film	Director	Cast	Release Date	Notes	Source
1960	Bhairavi	Dinkar D. Patil				
1960	Umaji Naik		Gajanan Jagirdar			
1960	Avaghachi Sansar	Anant Mane	Padma Chavan, Jayshree Gadkar, Raja Gosavi			
1960	Sangat Jadli Tujhi An Majhi	Prabhakar Naik	Damuanna Malvankar			
1960	Umaj Padel Tar	Dinkar D. Patil	Ramesh Deo, Sulochana, Chitra		Won National Film Award for Best Feature Film in Marathi in 1960	
1960	Pancharati	Datta Mane	Jayshree Gadkar, Suryakant, Sulochana			
1960	Vaijayanta	Gajanan Jagirdar				
1960	Paishyacha Paaus	Anant Mane	Raja Gosavi, Jayshree Gadkar, Ramesh Deo			
1960	Vanakesari	K. Vishwanath	Damuanna Malvankar, Master Vithal			
1960	Jagachya Pathivar	Raja Paranjape	Ramesh Deo, Seema Deo, Dhumal, Raja Paranjape			
1960	Kanyadaan	Madhav Shinde	Usha Kiran, Suryakant, Raja Gosavi, Dada Salvi		Won National Film Award for Best Feature Film in Marathi in 1960	
