= List of Marathi films of 1963 =

A list of films produced by the Marathi language film industry based in Maharashtra in the year 1963.

== 1963 Releases ==
A list of Marathi films released in 1963.

Year	Film	Director	Cast	Release Date	Producer	Notes	Source
1963	Baiko Maheri Jaate	Raja Paranjpe	Raja Paranjpe, Sachin Pilgaonkar, Sharad Talwalkar				
1963	Mohityanchi Manjula	Bhalji Pendharkar	Jayshree Gadkar, Chittaranjan Kolhatkar, Baburao Pendharkar				
1963	Sukhachi Sawali	Gajanan Jagirdar					
1963	Te Mazhe Ghar	Dinkar Patil			Ravindra Bhat	National Film Award for Second Best Feature Film in Marathi in 1963	
1963	Naar Nirmite Nara	Anant Mane	Sharad Talwalkar, Jayshree Gadkar				
1963	Subhadra Haran	Datta Dharmadhikari					
1963	Chhota Jawan	Ram Gabale	Jairaj, Sulochana, Gajanan Jagirdar				
1963	Majha Hoshil Ka?	Anant Mane	Ramesh Deo, Lalita Desai, Indira Chitnis				
1963	Molkarin	Yashwant Pethkar					
1963	Tu Sukhi Raha	Datta Mane	Suryakant				
