= List of Marathi films of 1957 =

A list of films produced by the Marathi language film industry based in Maharashtra in the year 1957.

== 1957 Releases ==
A list of Marathi films released in 1957.

Year	Film	Director	Cast	Release Date	Notes	Source
1957	Pahile Prem	Raja Nene				
1957	Dev Jaaga Aahe	Dinkar Patil	Chetan Dalvi			
1957	Navra Mhanu Naye Apula	Dinkar Patil				
1957	Jale Gele Visroon Jaa		Yashwant Pethkar			
1957	Aaliya Bhogasi	Datta Dharmadhikari	Jayshree Gadkar			
1957	Naikinicha Sazza	Bhalji Pendharkar	Baburao Pendharkar, Master Vithal, Hansa Wadkar			
1957	Jhakli Mooth	Anant Mane				
1957	Preet Sangam	Anant Mane				
1957	Devagharcha Lena	D. M. Ambapkar	Lalita Pawar			
1957	Aai Mala Kshama Kar	Vasant Chitalkar				
1957	Gruhdevta	Madhav Shinde			Won National Film Award for Best Feature Film in Marathi in 1957	
