= List of Marathi films of 1958 =

A list of films produced by the Marathi language film industry based in Maharashtra in the year 1958.

== 1958 Releases ==
A list of Marathi films released in 1958.

Year	Film	Director	Cast	Release date	Notes	Source
1958	Matevin Bal	Madhav Velankar	Master Vithal, Hansa Wadkar			
1958	Dhakti Jaaoo	Anant Mane	Sulochana, Smita, Vimala Vasishtha		Won National Film Award for Best Feature Film in Marathi in 1958	
1958	Sudamache Pohe	Keshavrao Dhaiber	Shahu Modak, Ratnamala, Bhalji Pendharkar			
1958	Punarjanma	Prabhakar Naik				
1958	Padada	Shantaram Athavale				
1958	Sukhache Sobti	Raja Bargir	Lalita Pawar			
1958	Don Ghadicha Daav	Anant Mane				
1958	Choravar More	Yeshwant Pethkar				
