= List of Marathi films of 1966 =

A list of films produced by the Marathi language film industry based in Maharashtra in the year 1966.

== 1966 Releases ==
A list of Marathi films released in 1966.

Year	Film	Director	Cast	Release Date	Producer	Notes	Source
1966	Ati Shahana Tyacha	Dutta Keshav Kulkarni					
1966	Gurukilli	Raja Paranjpe	Raja Paranjape, Raja Gosavi, Vasant Shinde				
1966	He Naar Roop Sundari	Prabhakar Naik					
1966	Nirmon	A. Salam			Frank Fernand	National Film Award for Second Best Feature Film in Marathi in 1965	
1966	Patlachi Soon	Datta Mane	Jayshree Gadkar, Suryakant				
1966	Pavna Kathcha Dhondi	Vinayak Thakur				National Film Award for Best Feature Film in Marathi in 1966	
1966	Sheras Savva Sher	Datta Mane	Master Vithal				
1966	Shodha Mhanje Sapdel	Sharad Diphadkar	Master Vithal				
1966	Sochi Sadhu Oalkhava	Datta Mane	Suryakant				
1966	Tuch Majhi Vahini	Yashwant Pethkar					
