= List of Marathi films of 1954 =

A list of films produced by the Marathi language film industry based in Maharashtra in the year 1954.

== 1954 Releases ==
A list of Marathi films released in 1954.

Year	Film	Director	Cast	Release Date	Notes	Source
1954	Postatil Mulgi	Ram Gabale				
1954	Sansar Karaichai Mala	Shantaram Athavale				
1954	Maharani Yesubai	Bhalji Pendharkar	Sulochana			
1954	Kanchanganga	Madhav Shinde				
1954	Owalni	Anant Mane				
1954	Mahatma Phule	P. K. Atre			The film won the first prestigious President's silver medal for Best Feature Film (Rajat Kamal) in Marathi in the 2nd National Film Awards function presented on 21 December 1955.	
1954	Tarka	Dinkar Patil	Damuanna Malvankar			
1954	Oon Paoos	Raja Paranjpe	Sumati Gupte, Raja Paranjpe			
1954	Shubhamangal	Anant Mane				
