= List of Marathi films of 1967 =

A list of films produced by the Marathi language film industry based in Maharashtra in the year 1967.

== 1967 Releases ==
A list of Marathi films released in 1967.

Year	Film	Director	Cast	Release Date	Producer	Notes	Source
1967	Kaka Mala Vachwa	Raja Paranjpe					
1967	Santh Wahate Krishnamai	M. G. Pathak			Sahakari Chitrapath Sanstha Ltd	National Film Award for Best Feature Film in Marathi in 1967	
1967	Chimukala Pahuna	Shubha Khote	Shanta Bedekar, Ramesh Deo, Kata Jukar		Shubhangi Kala Mandir		
1967	Saangu Kaishi Mee	Anant Mane					
1967	Pahila Bhau	Datta Mane	Ruby Mayer, Chandrakant, Suryakant, Sushama		Shri Suresh Chitra, Mumbai		
1967	Swapna Tech Lochani	Chandravadan	Chandrakant Gokhale, Ramesh Deo, Ratnamala				
1967	Juna Te Sona	Yashwant Pethkar					
1967	Thaamb Lakshmi Kunku Lavatey	Datta Dharmadhikari					
1967	Madhuchandra	Rajdutt	Kashinath Ghanekar, Shrikant Moghe, Uma				
1967	Deiva Janile Kuni	Krishna Patil	Aundhkar, Indubala Galdagekar, Padma Ghotwadekar		Hemant Chitra, Mumbai		
1967	Bai Mee Bholi	Krishna Patil	Madhu Apte, Balchandra, Bapusaheb		Hemant Chitra, Kolhapur		
1967	Deva Tuzhi Sonyachi Jejuri	Raja Bargir	Barchibahaddar, Leela Gandhi, Jog		Geeta Films		
1967	Suranga Mhantyat Mala	Dinkar D. Patil					
1967	Sudarshan	Datta Mane	Uma, Jeevan Kala, Ratnamala		Jeewan Chitra		
1967	Bara Varshe 6 Mahine 3 Diwas	Vasant Painter	Jog, Jayamala Kale, Nana Karmarkar		Rituraj Chitra, Mumbai		
