= List of Marathi films of 1935 =

A list of films produced by the Marathi language film industry based in Maharashtra in the year 1935.

== 1935 Releases ==
A list of Marathi films released in 1935.

Year	Film	Director	Cast	Release date	Production	Notes	Source
1935	Naganand	Y.V. Rao	Tara			Simultaneously made in Marathi and Hindi	
1935	Usha	Baburao Painter	Usha Mantri, Govindrao Tembe, Ratnaprabha			Simultaneously made in Marathi and Hindi	
1935	Vilasi Ishwar	Master Vinayak	Master Vinayak, Baburao Pendharkar, Bal Dhavale		Kolhapur Cinetone		
1935	Thakicha Lagna	Vishram Bedekar, Vamanrao N. Bhat	Damuanna Malvankar, Balwantrao Pethe, Shankarrao Majumdar				
1935	Satyacha Prayog	Vishram Bedekar, Vamanrao N. Bhat					
1935	Muraliwala	Bhalji Pendharkar				Simultaneously made in Marathi and Hindi as Kalia Mardan	
1935	Dharmatma	Rajaram Vankudre Shantaram	Bal Gandharva, Chandra Mohan, Master Chhotu, Ratnaprabha and Vasanti		Prabhat Films	Simultaneously made in Marathi and Hindi.Debut role of Bal Gandharva in films. Based on the religious poet and scholar Sant Eknath (1533–99)	
1935	Chandrasena	Rajaram Vankudre Shantaram	Nalini Tarkhad, Kulkarni, Sureshbabu Mane		Prabhat Films	Simultaneously made in Marathi, Hindi, Tamil	

Preceded by 1934	Marathi films 1935	Succeeded by 1936
