= List of Marathi films of 1950 =

A list of films produced by the Marathi language film industry based in Maharashtra in the year 1950.

== 1950 Releases ==
A list of Marathi films released in 1950.

Year	Film	Director	Cast	Release Date	Notes	Source
1950	Mee Daru Sodli	Bhalji Pendharkar				
1950	Pudhcha Paool	Raja Paranjpe	P.L. Deshpande, Hansa Wadkar			
1950	Ram Ram Pahune	Dinkar D. Patil			This is the one of two movies for which Lata Mangeshkar has composed music under her own name.	
1950	Bala Jo Jo Re	Datta Dharmadhikari	Suryakant, Vasant Shinde, Sulochana			
1950	Shilanganache Sone	Bhalji Pendharkar	Hansa Wadkar, Shanta Apte, Baburao Pendharkar, Suryakant, Master Vithal			
1950	Dev Pavla	Ram Gabale				
1950	Krantiveer Vasudev Balwant	Vishram Bedekar				
1950	Johar Maibaap	Ram Gabale				
1950	Vanshacha Diva	Govind Ghanekar				
1950	Patthe Bapurao	Raja Nene	Raja Nene, Ranjana			
1950	Var Pahije	Achyut Govind Ranade	Raja Paranjape			
1950	Ketakichya Banaat	Anant Mane, Raja Nene	Suryakant, Raina, Vasant Shinde			
1950	Jara Japun	Raja Paranjpe				
