= List of Marathi films of 1962 =

A list of films produced by the Marathi language film industry based in Maharashtra in the year 1962.

== 1962 Releases ==
A list of Marathi films released in 1962.

Year	Film	Director	Cast	Release date	Production	Notes	Source
1962	Baap Majha Brahmachari	Dinkar D. Patil					
1962	Gariba Gharchi Lek	Kamlakar Vishnu Torne			Shivaji Gulabrao Katkar	National Film Award for Third Best Feature Film in Marathi in 1962	
1962	Ha Maza Marga Ekala	Raja Paranjape	Sachin, Raja Paranjape, Seema Deo, Jeevan Kala		Sudhir Phadke	National Film Award for Best Feature Film in Marathi in 1963	
1962	Jaawai Mazha Bhala	Neelkanth Magdum			Maneesha Chitra Pvt Ltd.	National Film Award for Second Best Feature Film in Marathi in 1962	
1962	Rangalya Ratri Asha	Raja Thakur	Shahu Modak		The Maharashtra Film Industrial Co-Operative Society Ltd.	National Film Award for Best Feature Film in Marathi in 1962	
1962	Soniyachi Paoolen	Raja Paranjpe					
1962	Kshan Aala Bhagyacha	Datta Dharmadhikari					
1962	Vardakshina	Dinkar Patil	Mai Bhide, Gopal Bakre, Ramesh Deo		Liberty Enterprises, Shri Raghav Chitre		
1962	Prem Aandhale Aste	Dinkar Patil					
1962	Saptapadi		Datta Dharmadhikari				
1962	Vithu Mazha Lekurwala	Datta Dharmadhikari					
1962	Chimnyachi Shala	Anant Mane					
1962	Sukh Aale Mazhya Daari	Datta Mane	Jayshree Gadkar				
1962	Preeti Vivah	Anant Mane					
1962	Bhagya Lakshmi	Anant Mane	Amesh Deo, Damuanna Malvankar, Raja Gosavi				
