= List of Marathi films of 1964 =

A list of films produced by the Marathi language film industry based in Maharashtra in the year 1964.

== 1964 Releases ==
A list of Marathi films released in 1964.

Year	Film	Director	Cast	Producer	Notes	Ref(s)
1964	Pathlaag	Raja Paranjpe	Bhavana, Kashinath Ghanekar, Raja Paranjape	Raja Paranjape	National Film Award for Best Feature Film in Marathi in 1964	
1964	Phakir	Chandrashekhar				
1964	Sawaal Majha Aika!	Anant Govind Mane	Jayshree Gadkar, Arun Sarnaik, Dada Salvi	Anant Govind Mane	National Film Award for Third Best Feature Film in Marathi in 1964	
1964	Tuka Jhalasi Kalas	Raja Nene		N. G. Datar	National Film Award for Second Best Feature Film in Marathi in 1964	
1964	Vat Chuklele Navra	Datta Mane	Raja Gosavi, Damuanna Malvankar			
1964	Sundara Manamadhye Bharli	Devdutt	Lalita Pawar			
1964	Sant Nivrutti Dnyandev	Madhukar Pathak				
1964	Swayamvar Zale Seeteche					
1964	Vaishakh Vanwa	Datta Dharmadhikari				
1964	Maratha Tituka Melvava	Bhalji Pendharkar	Alhad, Kashinath Ghanekar, Chandrakant Gokhale			
1964	Kai Ho Chamatkar	Anant Mane				
