= Bolto =

Bolto may refer to:

- Bolto, South Australia, a locality on the left bank of the Murray River near Mannum
- Laevar Bolto, character in DC Comics
- Paisa Bolto Aahe, a 1943 film directed by Vishram Bedekar
