= List of Marathi films of 1956 =

A list of films produced by the Marathi language film industry based in Maharashtra in the year 1956.

== 1956 Releases ==
A list of Marathi films released in 1956.

Year	Film	Director	Cast	Release Date	Notes	Source
1956	Diste Tasa Naste	Dinkar Patil				
1956	Pavankhind	Bhalji Pendharkar	Baburao Pendharkar, Suryakant, Master Vithal			
1956	Devghar	Raja Paranjape	Raja Gosavi, Laxmibai Sule, Nanda			
1956	Paidali Padleli Phule	Anant Mane	Lalita Pawar			
1956	Gath Padli Thaka Thaka	Raja Paranjape	Baburao Pendharkar, Raja Gosavi, Raja Paranjape			
1956	Andhala Magto Ek Dola	Raja Paranjape				
1956	Pasant Aahe Mulgi	Raja Paranjape				
