= List of Marathi films of 1952 =

A list of films produced by the Marathi language film industry based in Maharashtra in the year 1952.

== 1952 Releases ==
A list of Marathi films released in 1952.

Year	Film	Director	Cast	Release Date	Notes	Source
1952	Akher Jamle	Datta Dharmadhikari	Suryakant, Sharad Talwalkar, Raja Gosavi			
1952	Amar Bhoopali	Shantaram Rajaram Vankudre				
1952	May Bahini	Dinkar Patil				
1952	Chimani Pakhre	Datta Dharmadhikari	Baby Shakuntala		Simultaneously made in Marathi and Hindi as Nanhe Munne	
1952	Belbhandar					
1952	Stree Janma Hi Tuzhi Kahani	Datta Dharmadhikari				
1952	Dudh Bhaat	Ram Gabale				
1952	Ghardhani	Ram Gabale				
1952	Jeevachi Mumbai	Achyut Govind Ranade				
1952	Mayecha Pazhar	Madhav Shinde	Lalita Pawar, Master Vithal			
1952	Pedgaoche Shahane	Raja Paranjpe	Raja Paranjpe			
1952	Narveer Tanaji	Ram Narayan Gabale	Durga Khote, Master Vithal			
1952	Mard Maratha	K. Talpade	Master Vithal			
1952	Lakhachi Gosht	Raja Paranjpe	Chitra, Raja Gosavi, Rekha Kamat			
1952	Chhatrapati Shivaji	Bhalji Pendharkar	Parshwanath Yeshwant Altekar, Chandrakant, Gajanan Jagirdar		Simultaneously made in Marathi and Hindi	
