= List of Marathi films of 1969 =

A list of films produced by the Marathi language film industry based in Maharashtra in the year 1969.

== 1969 Releases ==
A list of Marathi films released in 1969.

Year	Film	Director	Cast	Release Date	Producer	Notes	Source
1969	Aadhar	Raja Paranjpe	Raja Paranjpe, Anupama, Lalita Desai, Madhu Apte, Vivek				
1969	Jiwhala	Atmaram	Jayshree Gadkar				
1969	Janaki	Datta Mane					
1969	Dongarchi Maina		Jayshree Gadkar, Arun Sarnaik, Chitra				
1969	Gangawlan	Anant Mane					
1969	Satiche Vaan	Datt Adhekari	Lalita Pawar, Asha Kale, Krushnakant Darvi				
1969	Manaacha Mujra	Raja Bargir	Mai Bhide, Chandrakant, Leela Gandhi		Shridutt Chitra		
1969	Nandaila Jaate	Yashwant Pethkar					
1969	Aparadh	Rajdutt					
1969	Tambadi Mati	Bhalji Pendharkar	Anupama, Asha Kale, Dada Kondke, Neelam		Gayatri Chitra	National Film Award for Best Feature Film in Marathi in 1969	
