= List of Marathi films of 1951 =

A list of films produced by the Marathi language film industry based in Maharashtra in the year 1951.

== 1951 Releases ==
A list of Marathi films released in 1951.

Year	Film	Director	Cast	Release date	Notes	Source
1951	Amar Bhoopali	V. Shantaram	Panditrao Nagarkar, Lalita Pawar, Sandhya			
1951	Hee Mazhi Laxmi	Pralhad Keshav Atre				
1951	Jashyas Tase	Ram Gabale				
1951	Kunkwacha Dhani	Datta Dharmadhikari				
1951	Nandkishore	Vasant Joglekar	Lalita Pawar		Simultaneously made in Marathi and Hindi	
1951	Parijatak	Raja Paranjpe	Chandrakant, Suryakant, Master Vithal		Simultaneously made in Marathi and Hindi as Shrikrishna Satyabhama	
1951	Patlache Por	Dinkar Patil				
1951	Sharada	Dinkar Patil				
1951	Shiva Ramoshi	K. P. Bhave	Chandrakant, Sulochana, Vinay Kale			
1951	Shivleela	Govind Ghanekar			Simultaneously made in Marathi and Hindi	
1951	Swarajyacha Shiledar	Master Vithal	Chandrakant, Suryakant, Master Vithal			
1951	Vithal Rakhumai	Yashwant Pethkar				
