= List of Marathi films of 1947 =

A list of films produced by the Marathi language film industry based in Maharashtra in the year 1947.

== 1947 Releases ==
A list of Marathi films released in 1947.

Year	Film	Director	Cast	Release Date	Production	Notes	Source
1947	Lokshahir Ram Joshi	Baburao Painter, Rajaram Vankudre Shantaram	Jayaram Shiledar, Hansa Wadkar		Pradeep Production	Simultaneously made in Marathi and Hindi as Matwala Shair Ram Joshi	
1947	Chool Ani Mool	Vishram Bedekar					
1947	Jai Bhawani	Jaishankar Danve	Suryakant, Master Vithal				
