= List of Marathi films of 1953 =

A list of films produced by the Marathi language film industry based in Maharashtra in the year 1953.

== 1953 Releases ==
A list of Marathi films released in 1953.

Year	Film	Director	Cast	Release Date	Notes	Source
1953	Sant Bahinabai	R. S. Junnarkar	Lalita Pawar			
1953	Ammaldar	K. Narayan Kale, Madhukar Kulkarni	P. L. Deshpande			
1953	Mahatma	Datta Dharmadhikari	Gajanan Jagirdar, David, Rekha		Simultaneously made in Marathi and Hindi	
1953	Soubhagya	Datta Dharmadhikari	Raja Nene		Simultaneously made in Marathi and Hindi as Bhagyawan	
1953	Mahajan	Baburao Painter				
1953	Mazi Zameen	Bhalji Pendharkar				
1953	Aboli	Anant Mane				
1953	Devbappa	Ram Gabale	Chitra, Medha Gupte, Vivek			
1953	Shyamchi Aai	P. K. Atre	Damuanna Joshi, Vanamala, Madhav Vaze, Saraswati Bodas, Sumati Gupte		Shyamchi Aai won the Golden Lotus Award for Best Film at the National Film Awards in 1954.It is The First Film in India to be awarded with THE NATIONAL AWARD for The BEST FILM.	
1953	Sant Bhanudas	G. P. Pawar				
1953	Vahininchya Bangdya	Shantaram Athavale	Sulochana, Madhav Vaze, Vivek			
1953	Kon Kunacha	Yeshwant Pethkar				
1953	Tai Teleen	K.P. Bhave, Anto Narhari	Shanta Apte, Dinshaw Bilimoria, Master Vithal			
1953	Vaadal	Madhav Shinde	Master Vithal			
1953	Maisaheb	K.P. Bhave	Parshwanath Yeshwant Altekar			
1953	Gulacha Ganapati	P.L. Deshpande	Chitra, P.L. Deshpande, Vinay Kale			
