= List of Marathi films of 1942 =

A list of films produced by the Marathi language film industry based in Maharashtra in the year 1942.

== 1942 Releases ==
A list of Marathi films released in 1942.

Year	Film	Director	Cast	Release date	Production	Notes	Source
1942	Pahili Mangalagaur	R.S. Junnarkar	Vishnupant Jog, Lata Mangeshkar, Shahu Modak, Snehprabha Pradhan		Prabhat Films	This film is primarily remembered for being the acting debut of legend Lata Mangeshkar	
1942	Kiti Hasaal	Vasant Joglekar					
1942	Pahila Palna	Vishram Bedekar	Shanta Hublikar, Indu Natu, Baburao Pendharkar				
1942	Bhakta Damaji	Bhalji Pendharkar	Lalita Pawar				
1942	Sarkari Pahune	Master Vinayak	Shakuntala Bhome, Vishnupant Jog, Vatsala Kumthekar				
1942	Vasantsena	Gajanan Jagirdar	Chintamanrao Kolhatkar			Simultaneously made in Marathi and Hindi	
1942	Soonbai	Bhalji Pendharkar	Raja Paranjpe, Master Vithal				
1942	10 O'Clock	Raja Nene	Baby Shakuntala, Gokhale, Kishan		Prabhat Films	Simultaneously made in Marathi and Hindi as Das Baje	
