= Sulochana =

- Gender: Female
- Language: Hindi; Sanskrit

Origin
- Meaning: "one with beautiful eyes"
- Region of origin: India

Sulochana (Hindi: सुलोचना, "one with beautiful eyes") is a popular Indian feminine given name, and may refer to:

== People ==
- Sulochana Brahaspati (born 1937), Indian vocalist of Hindustani classical music
- Sulochana Chavan (1933–2022), Marathi singer known for singing lavanis
- Sulochana Gadgil (1944–2025), Indian climatologist, mathematician, meteorologist and oceanographer
- Sulochana Katkar (1929–2012), Goan politician
- Sulochana Latkar (1928–2023), actress in Marathi and Hindi cinema, often billed simply as Sulochana
- Sulochana Manandhar (born 1955), Nepali poet, writer, columnist and political activist
- Sulochana, stage name of Ruby Myers (1907–1983), Indian silent film star

== Films ==
- Sati Sulochana (1921 film), a silent Marathi film directed by G.V. Sane
- Sati Sulochana, the first 1934 Kannada-language "talkie", directed by Y. V. Rao
- Sulochana (1947 film), Tamil film produced by Modern Theatres
- Sati Sulochana (1961 film), Telugu film directed by Rajanikanth Sabnavis, starring N. T. Rama Rao
- Sati Sulochana (1969 film), directed by S. N. Tripathi

== Others ==
- Sulochana, an epic poem by Nepali author Laxmi Prasad Devkota
- Sulochana (Ramayana), the daughter of Shesha, married to Indrajit, in the Hindu epic Ramayana
- Sulochana (सुलोचनः), one of Hindu deity Vishnu's '1,000 names'; see Vishnu Sahasranama
- Sulochana is the name of Yakshini from a list of 36 yakshinis given in the Uddamareshvara Tantra, she gives Paduka Siddhi, enabling one to travel at great speed through the aethers
