= List of Marathi films of 1955 =

A list of films produced by the Marathi language film industry based in Maharashtra in the year 1955.

== 1955 Releases ==
A list of Marathi films released in 1955.

Year	Film	Director	Cast	Release Date	Notes	Source
1955	Ganget Ghode Nhahale	Raja Paranjpe				
1955	Yere Majhya Maglya	Bhalji Pendharkar				
1955	Punvechi Raat	Anant Mane				
1955	Kuladaivat	Dinkar D. Patil				
1955	Kalagi Tura	S. Chavan	Lalita Pawar			
1955	Muthbhar Chane	Dinkar D. Patil				
1955	Bhalyachi Duniya	Govind B. Ghanekar				
1955	Me Tulas Tujhya Angani	Raja Thakur			President's silver medal for Best Feature Film at the National Film Awards in 1955	
1955	Shevagyachya Shenga	Shantaram Athavale	Balakram, Master Chhotu, Sumati Gupte		Wins certificate of merit at National Film Awards in 1955.Shown at Cannes Film Festival	
1955	Shirdiche Sai Baba	Kumarsen Samarth			Won the Golden Lotus Award (Swarna Kamal) for Best Film at the National Film Awards {All India Certificate of Merit}	
