= List of Marathi films of 1970 =

A list of films produced by the Marathi language film industry based in Maharashtra in the year 1970.

== 1970 Releases ==
A list of Marathi films released in 1970.

Year	Film	Director	Cast	Release Date	Producer	Notes	Source
1970	Aai Aahe Shetat	Prabhakar Manajirao Nayak					
1970	Mumbaicha Jawai	Raja Thakur			Tushar Pradhan	National Film Award for Best Feature Film in Marathi in 1970	
1970	Ganane Ghungroo Haravale	Datta Mane	Uma, Arun Sarnaik, Asha Kale				
1970	Meech Tuzhi Priya	Dutta Keshav Kulkarni					
1970	Dhakti Bahin	Rajdutt					
1970	Dev Manoos	Rajdutt					
