= List of Marathi films of 1996 =

A list of films produced by the Marathi language film industry based in Maharashtra in the year 1996.

== 1996 Releases ==
A list of Marathi films released in 1996.

Year	Film	Director	Cast	Notes	Source
1996	Rao Saheb	Sanjay Surkar	Mohan Joshi, Prashant Subhedar, Dilip Kulkarni	National Film Award for Best Feature Film in Marathi in 1996	
1996	Putravati	Bhaskar Jadhav	Asha Kale, Sukanya Kulkarni, Avinash Narkar		
1996	Maaya Mamata	Babasaheb S. Fattelal	Ashok Saraf, Alka Kubal, Usha Naik		
1996	Katha Don Ganpatravanchi	Arun Khopkar	Dilip Prabhawalkar, Mohan Aagashe, Sushma Deshpande		
