= List of Marathi films of 1981 =

A list of films produced by the Marathi language film industry based in Maharashtra in the year 1981.

== 1981 releases ==
A list of Marathi films released in 1981.

Year	Film	Director	Cast	Release Date	Producer	Notes	Source
1981	Nagin	Ramakant Kavthekar, Vivek Vasant	Nana Patekar, Nilu Phule, Ranjana				
1981	Akriet	Amol Palekar	Haidar Ali, Dilip Kulkarni, Amol Palekar, Chitra Palekar, Rekha Sabnis				
1981	Mosambi Narangi	Datta Keshav	Jeetendra, Usha Chavan			Jeetendra's debut in marathi film	
1981	Gondhalat Gondhal	V.K. Naik	Ravindra Mahajani, Ranjana, Ashok Saraf, Priya Tendulkar, Raghvenra Kadkol				
1981	Are Sansar Sansar	Rajdutt					
1981	Pori Jara Japun	Anant Mane					
1981	Sundara Satarkar	Prabhakar Nikanth	Ashok Saraf	1 May 1981 (India)		Rajesh Khanna made special appearance for this movie	
1981	Manacha Kunku	Govind Kulkarni	Suhasini Deshpande, Ravindra Disa, Yashwant Dutt		Shubha Karit Chitre		
1981	Ghar Jawai	Arun Vasudev Karnatki	Manorama Wagle				
1981	Totaya Aamdaar	Anant Mane					
1981	Aai	Anant Mane					
1981	Laath Mareen Tithe Pani	Prabhakar Manajirao Nayak					
1981	Satichi Punyayee	Datta Dharmadhikari					
