= List of Marathi films of 1998 =

A list of films produced by the Marathi language film industry, based in the Indian state of Maharashtra in the year 1998.

== 1998 Releases ==
The following is a list of Marathi films released in 1998.

| Year | Film | Director | Cast | Release date | Producer | Notes | Source |
|---|---|---|---|---|---|---|---|
| 1998 | Sarkarnama | Shrabani Deodhar | Ashwini Bhave, Ajinkya Deo, Yashwant Dutt | 1 January 1998 (India) | Ajey Jhankar | | |
| 1998 | Tu Tithe Mee | Sanjay Surkar | Prashant Damle, Mohan Joshi, Suhaas Joshi | 22 April 1998 (India) | Everest Entertainment | National Film Award for Best Feature Film in Marathi in 1998 | |
| 1998 | Jigar | Kumar Sohoni | Laxmikant Berde, Ravindra Berde, Sakharam Bhave | | Jai Saptshrungi Films | | |
| 1998 | Sar Kas Shant Shant | Dilip Kolhatkar | Satish Pulekar, Nishigandha Wad | | | | |
| 1998 | Navsach Por | Girish Ghanekar | Alka kubal Ramesh Bhatkar; Yashwant Dutt; Sanjay Narvekar | 2 February 1998 | Girish Ghanekar | | |
