= List of Marathi films of 1946 =

A list of films produced by the Marathi language film industry based in Maharashtra in the year 1946.

== 1946 Releases ==
A list of Marathi films released in 1946.

Year	Film	Director	Cast	Release Date	Production	Notes	Source
1946	Rukmini Swayamvar	Baburao Painter	Durga Khote, Baburao Pendharkar, Master Vithal		Pradeep Production	Simultaneously made in Marathi and Hindi	
1946	Sasurvaas	Bhalji Pendharkar	Raja Paranjpe, Suryakant, Master Vithal				
