= List of Marathi films of 1973 =

A list of films produced by the Marathi language film industry based in Maharashtra in the year 1973.

== 1973 Releases ==
A list of Marathi films released in 1973.

Year	Film	Director	Cast	Release Date	Producer	Notes	Source
1973	Andhala Marto Dola	Dada Kondke	Dada, Anjana				
1973	Mala Dev Betla	Dutta Keshav Kulkarni					
1973	Thapadya	Prabhakar Naik	Nilu Phule, Ratnamala, Usha Chavan				
1973	Varhadi Ani Vajantri	Rajdutt	Sulochana, Indumati Paingankar, Vikram Gokhale				
1973	Patle Tar Vhai Mhana	Prabhakar Naik					
1973	Mee Tujha Pati Nahi	Anant Mane					
1973	Haath Lavin Tithe Sona	Datta Mane	Nilu Phule				
1973	Bholi Bhabdi	Rajdutt					
1973	Nasti Uthathev	Datta Dharmadhikari					
1973	Anolkhi	Kamalakar Torne	Master Alankar, Padma Chavan, Vikram Gokhale	7 March 1973	Everest Entertainment		
