= List of Marathi films of 2002 =

A list of films produced by the Marathi language film industry based in Maharashtra in the year 2002.

== 2002 Releases ==
A list of Marathi films released in 2002.

| Year | Film | Director | Cast | Release Date | Producer | Notes | Source |
|---|---|---|---|---|---|---|---|
2002
| 2002 | Vastupurush | Sumitra Bhave, Sunil Sukthankar | Sadashiv Amrapurkar, Uttara Baokar, Siddharth Daftardar | | National Film Development Corporation of India | National Film Award for Best Feature Film in Marathi in 2002 | |
| 2002 | Dahavi Fa | Sumitra Bhave, Sunil Sukthankar | Atul Kulkarni, Jyoti Subhash, Milind Gunaji | 17 February 2002 | Sunil Sukthankar | | |
| 2002 | Bhet | Chandrakant Kulkarni | Atul Kulkarni, Tushar Dalvi, Vijay Divan, Manjusha Godse | 31 May 2002 (India) | Everest Entertainment | | |
| 2002 | Owalini | Dr. Babasaheb Powar | Chetan Dalvi, Alka Inamdar, Alka Kubal | 26 April 2002 (India) | Everest Entertainment | | |
