= Apna Paraya =

- Apna Paraya movie poster
- Directed by: Ramchandra Thakur
- Starring: Shahu Modak; Hansa Wadkar; Dulari
- Music by: Anil Biswas
- Production company: National Studios
- Release date: 1942
- Country: India
- Language: Hindi

Apna Paraya is a Bollywood film. It was released in 1942. The film starred Shahu Modak, Hansa Wadkar, Dulari, Kayam Ali, Sankatha Prasad and Shakuntala. It was directed by Ramchandra Thakur for National Studios. The music was composed by Anil Biswas and lyrics written by Pandit Indra.

== Cast ==
- Shahu Modak
- Hansa Wadkar
- Dulari
- Kayam Ali
- Sankatha Prasad
- Shakuntala
- Pesi Patel
- Agha
- Rajrani

== Soundtrack ==
The film's music was composed by Anil Biswas, and the lyricist was Pandit Indra.

=== Song list ===
- "Ek Dulhan Thi Mastani"
- "O Pardesi Ghar Aaja" -Rajkumari
- "Rang Daare Sautan Pe Sanwariya"
- "Bandh Gayi Re Main To Saajan Ke Sang"
- "Kyon Prem Hi Prem Pukare"
- "Mohabbat Karne Waalon Se"
- "Ram Jaane Kaise Do Dil"
- "Koi Nainan Ki Nindiya Churaye Gaya Ho"
- "Anjaan Bane Mehmaan" - Rajkumari
- "Gori Kaahe Khadi Angana"
- "Ishq Ke Bazaar Mein Jo Aayenge"
