= List of Marathi films of 1959 =

A list of films produced by the Marathi language film industry based in Maharashtra in the year 1959.

== 1959 Releases ==
A list of Marathi films released in 1959.

Year	Film	Director	Cast	Notes	Source
1959	Keechak Vadha	Yashwant Pethkar	Sumti Gupte, Shobhana Samarth, Baburao Pendharkar	Simultaneously made in Marathi and Hindi	
1959	Akashganga	Bhalji Pendharkar	Suryakant, Master Vithal, Sulochana		
1959	Pativrata	Datta Dharmadhikari			
1959	Sangte Aika	Anant Mane	Chandrakant, Jayshree Gadkar, Sulochana Latkar		
1959	Yala Jeevan Aise Naav	Raja Nene			
1959	Saata Janmachi Sobti	Anant Mane	Sudha Apte, Mai Bhide, Ramesh Deo		
1959	Shikleli Bayko	Madhav Shinde	Usha Kiran, Indira Chitnis, Suryakant, Sudha Apte, Bapuso, Dada Salvi		
