= List of Marathi films of 1948 =

A list of films produced by the Marathi language film industry based in Maharashtra in the year 1948.

== 1948 Releases ==
A list of Marathi films released in 1948.

Year	Film	Director	Cast	Release Date	Production	Notes	Source
1948	Vande Mataram	Ram Narayan Gabale					
1948	Jeevacha Sakha	Raja Paranjpe	Baby Ambedkar, Saroj Borkar, Dhumal		Mangal Pictures		
1948	Moruchi Maushi	Pralhad Keshav Atre					
1948	Balidaan	Raja Paranjpe				Simultaneously made in Marathi and Hindi as Do Kaliyan	
1948	Bhagya Rekha	Shantaram Athavale	Narayan Hari Apte				
1948	Garibanche Rajya	Master Chhotu, Tunge S.V.	Master Vithal				
