= List of Marathi films of 1923 =

A list of films produced by the Marathi language film industry based in Maharashtra in the year 1923.

== 1923 Releases ==
A list of Marathi films released in 1923.

Year	Film	Director	Cast	Release date	Production	Notes	Source
1923	Ram Maruti Yuddha	Dhundiraj Govind Phalke	Sakharam Jadhav, Bhaurao Datar		Hindustan Cinema Film Company	Silent Film With Marathi intertitles	
1923	Mahananda	Dhundiraj Govind Phalke	B. Pawar, Dada Pendse, Bhaurao Datar		Hindustan Cinema Film Company	Silent Film With Marathi intertitles	
1923	Jarasandha Vadha	Dhundiraj Govind Phalke	Bhaurao Datar, B. Pawar, Ghanshyam Singh		Hindustan Cinema Film Company	Silent Film With Marathi intertitles	
1923	Guru Dronacharya	Dhundiraj Govind Phalke	Bhaurao Datar, Dada Pendse, Charubai		Hindustan Cinema Film Company	Silent Film With Marathi intertitles	
1923	Buddha Dev	Dhundiraj Govind Phalke	Anna Salunke, Bhaurao Datar		Hindustan Cinema Film Company	Silent Film With Marathi intertitles	
1923	Bhakta Gora Kumbhar	Dhundiraj Govind Phalke				Silent Film With Marathi intertitles	
1923	Babruwahan	Dhundiraj Govind Phalke	Sakharam Jadhav, Dada Pendse, Bhaurao Datar		Hindustan Cinema Film Company	Silent Film With Marathi intertitles	
1923	Ashwathama	Dhundiraj Govind Phalke	Gotiram, Bhaurao Datar, Dada Pendse		Hindustan Cinema Film Company	Silent Film With Marathi intertitles	
