= List of Marathi films of 1941 =

A list of films produced by the Marathi language film industry based in Maharashtra in the year 1941.

== 1941 Releases ==
A list of Marathi films released in 1941.

| Year | Film | Director | Cast | Release Date | Production | Notes | Source |
|---|---|---|---|---|---|---|---|
| 1941 | Shejari | Rajaram Vankudre Shantaram | Keshavrao Date, Gajanan Jagirdar | | Prabhat Films | Simultaneously made in Marathi and Hindi as Padosi | |
| 1941 | Thoratanchi Kamla | Bhalji Pendharkar | Chandrakant, Sumati Gupte, Nanasaheb Phatak | | | | |
| 1941 | Payachi Dasi | Gajanan Jagirdar | Avinash, Kusum Deshpande, Gajanan Jagirdar | | | Simultaneously made in Marathi and Hindi as Charnon Ki Dasi | |
| 1941 | Nirdosh | V. C. Desai | Nalini Jaywant, Mukesh | | | | |
| 1941 | Amrit | Master Vinayak | Dada Salvi, Baburao Pendharkar, Lalita Pawar | | Navyug Chitrapat | Simultaneously made in Marathi and Hindi | |
