= List of Marathi films of 1949 =

A list of films produced by the Marathi language film industry based in Maharashtra in the year 1949.

== 1949 Releases ==
A list of Marathi films released in 1949.

Year	Film	Director	Cast	Notes	Source
1949	Pyala	Phani Majumdar			
1949	Sant Janabai	Govind B. Ghanekar	Hansa Wadkar	Simultaneously made in Marathi and Hindi	
1949	Sakharpuda	Vasant Joglekar			
1949	Sant Namdev	K. Talpade	Lalita Pawar		
1949	Mazha Ram	Gunjal			
1949	Brahmagotala	Pralhad Keshav Atre			
1949	Sant Ramdas	Raja Nene			
1949	Meeth Bhakar	Bhalji Pendharkar			
1949	Manacha Pan	A.R. Sheikh	Lalita Pawar		
1949	Maya Bazaar	Datta Dharmadhikari	Durga Khote	Simultaneously made in Marathi and Hindi	
1949	Jaaga Bhadyani Dene Aahe	Achyut Govind Ranade			
