= List of Marathi films of 1929 =

A list of films produced by the Marathi language film industry based in Maharashtra in the year 1929.

== 1929 Releases ==
A list of Marathi films released in 1929.

Year	Film	Director	Cast	Release date	Production	Notes	Source
1929	Vasantsena	Dhundiraj Govind Phalke	Gotiram, Sakharam Jadhav, J.K. Nanda		Hindustan Cinema Film Company	Silent Film With Marathi intertitles	
1929	Sant Mirabai	Dhundiraj Govind Phalke	Shakuntala		Hindustan Cinema Film Company	Silent Film With Marathi intertitles	
1929	Malvikagni Mitra	Dhundiraj Govind Phalke	Shakuntala, Kishori Pathak, Krishna Kumbhar		Hindustan Cinema Film Company	Silent Film With Marathi intertitles	
1929	Malti Madhav	Dhundiraj Govind Phalke	Anasuya, Krishna Kumbhar		Hindustan Cinema Film Company	Silent Film With Marathi intertitles	
1929	Kacha Devayani	Dhundiraj Govind Phalke			Hindustan Cinema Film Company	Silent Film With Marathi intertitles	
1929	Chandrahasa	Dhundiraj Govind Phalke			Hindustan Cinema Film Company	Silent Film With Marathi intertitles	
1929	Bolki Tapeli	Dhundiraj Govind Phalke			Hindustan Cinema Film Company	Silent Film With Marathi intertitles	
1929	Gopal Krishna	V Shantaram	Kamaladevi, Anant Apte, Sakribai		Prabhat Film Company	Silent Film With Marathi intertitles	
