= List of Marathi films of 1922 =

A list of films produced by the Marathi language film industry based in Maharashtra in the year 1922.

== 1922 Releases ==
A list of Marathi films released in 1922.

Year	Film	Director	Cast	Release date	Production	Notes	Source
1922	Kalidas	Shree Nath Patankar	Tara Koregaonkar, Baba Vyas	1 January 1922		Silent Film With Marathi intertitles	
1922	Rajrishi Ambarish	Dhundiraj Govind Phalke			Hindustan Cinema Film Company	Silent Film With Marathi intertitles	
1922	Ahmadabad Congress	Dhundiraj Govind Phalke				Silent Film With Marathi intertitles	
1922	Sant Namdev	Dhundiraj Govind Phalke			Hindustan Cinema Film Company	Silent Film With Marathi intertitles	
