= List of Marathi films of 1938 =

A list of films produced by the Marathi language film industry based in Maharashtra in the year 1938.

== 1938 Releases ==
A list of Marathi films released in 1938.

Year	Film	Director	Cast	Release date	Production	Notes	Source
1938	Brahmachari	Master Vinayak	Master Vinayak, Meenakshi Shirodkar, V.G. Jog		Huns Pics	Written by Pralhad Keshav Atre.Indian Cinema's first bathing suit scene by Meenakshi Shirodkar.Simultaneously made in Marathi and Hindi	
1938	Sant Janabai	N.G. Devare, Narayanrao D. Sarpotdar					
1938	Savangadi	Parshwanath Yeshwant Altekar				Simultaneously made in Marathi and Hindi as Saathi	
1938	Umaji Naik	Gajanan Jagirdar					
1938	Nandakumar	Keshavrao Dhaiber				Simultaneously made in Marathi and Hindi	
1938	Mazha Mulga	K. Narayan Kale	Shanta Hublikar, Shahu Modak, Mama Bhatt		Prabhat Films	Simultaneously made in Marathi and Hindi as Mera Ladka	
1938	Gopal Krishna	Vishnupant Govind Damle, Sheikh Fattelal	Ram Marathe, Shanta Apte, Parsuram		Prabhat Films	Simultaneously made in Marathi and Hindi	
1938	Jwala	Master Vinayak	Chandra Mohan, Ratnaprabha, Ashalata Wabgaonkar		Huns Pics	Simultaneously made in Marathi and Hindi	
1938	Lakshmich Khel	Vishram Bedekar					
1938	Raja Gopichand	Bhalji Pendharkar					
1938	Dhruva Kumar	K.P. Bhave				Simultaneously made in Marathi and Hindi	
