= List of Marathi films of 1943 =

A list of films produced by the Marathi language film industry based in Maharashtra in the year 1943.

== 1943 Releases ==
A list of Marathi films released in 1943.

Year	Film	Director	Cast	Release Date	Production	Notes	Source
1943	Bahirji Naik	Bhalji Pendharkar	Suryakant, Master Vithal				
1943	Paisa Bolto Aahe	Vishram Bedekar	Nalini Dhere		New Huns Pictures	Simultaneously made in Marathi and Hindi as Nagad Narayan	
1943	Baeelveda	K. Narayan Kale					
1943	Chimukla Sansar	Vasant Joglekar					
1943	Mazhe Bal	Master Vinayak	Meenakshi, Dada Salvi, Master Vinayak				
