= List of Marathi films of 1924 =

A list of films produced by the Marathi language film industry based in Maharashtra in the year 1924.

== 1924 Releases ==
A list of Marathi films released in 1924.

Year	Film	Director	Cast	Release date	Production	Notes	Source
1924	Vinchucha Dansha	Dhundiraj Govind Phalke			Hindustan Cinema Film Company	Silent Film With Marathi intertitles	
1924	Sita Shuddhi	Dhundiraj Govind Phalke				Silent Film With Marathi intertitles	
1924	Shivajichi Agryahun Sutaka	Dhundiraj Govind Phalke	Bhaurao Datar, Jardos, Laxman Malusare		Hindustan Cinema Film Company	Silent Film With Marathi intertitles	
1924	Municipal Elections	Dhundiraj Govind Phalke	B. Pawar, Sakharam Jadhav, Shinde		Hindustan Cinema Film Company	Silent Film With Marathi intertitles	
