= List of Marathi films of 1920 =

A list of films produced by the Marathi language film industry based in Maharashtra in the year 1920.

== 1920 Releases ==
A list of Marathi films released in 1920.

Year	Film	Director	Cast	Release date	Production	Notes	Source
1920	Shri Krishna Leela	G.V. Sane			Hindustan Cinema Film Company	Silent Film	
1920	Ram Janma	G.V. Sane			Hindustan Cinema Film Company	Silent Film	
1920	Kansa Vadha	G.V. Sane			Hindustan Cinema Film Company	Silent Film	
1920	Jalandhar Vrinda	G.V. Sane			Hindustan Cinema Film Company	Silent Film	
1920	Shakuntala	Shree Nath Patankar				Silent Film	
1920	Seeta Swayamvar	Shree Nath Patankar				Silent Film	
1920	Narasinha Avtaar	Shree Nath Patankar				Silent Film	
1920	Katorabhar Khoon	Shree Nath Patankar				Silent Film	
1920	Vichitra Gutika	Shree Nath Patankar				Silent Film	
1920	Sati Parvati	V.P. Divekar				Silent Film	
1920	Shri Krishna Sudama	V.P. Divekar				Silent Film	
1920	Sairandhri	Baburao Painter	Balasabeb Yadav, Zunzharrao Pawar, Kamaladevi		Maharashtra Film	Silent Film	
