= List of Marathi films of 1944 =

A list of films produced by the Marathi language film industry based in Maharashtra in the year 1944.

== 1944 Releases ==
A list of Marathi films released in 1944.

Year	Film	Director	Cast	Release Date	Production	Notes	Source
1944	Ramshastri	Vishram Bedekar, Gajanan Jagirdar, Raja Nene	Gajanan Jagirdar, Anant Marathe, Shakuntala Paranjpye		Prabhat Films	Simultaneously made in Marathi and Hindi	
1944	Bhakticha Mala	Keshavrao Date				Simultaneously made in Marathi and Hindi as Mali	
