= List of Marathi films of 1933 =

A list of films produced by the Marathi language film industry, based in Maharashtra in the year 1933.

== Released films ==
A list of Marathi films released in 1933.

Year	Film	Director	Cast	Release date	Production	Notes	Source
1933	Sinhagad	Rajaram Vankudre Shantaram	Keshavrao Dhaiber, Ganpat G. Shinde, Shankarrao Bhosle, Bazarbattoo, Baburao Pendharkar, Budasaheb, Master Vinayak, Leela, Prabhavati		Prabhat Films	Based on Hari Narayan Apte's literary classic novel "Gadh Aala Pan Sinha Gela"	
1933	Sairandhri	Rajaram Vankudre Shantaram	Shakuntala Paranjpye, Master Vinayak, Leela, G.R. Mane, Shankarrao Bhosle		Prabhat Films	Based on an incident from the Mahabharata	
