= List of Marathi films of 1925 =

A list of films produced by the Marathi language film industry based in Maharashtra in the year 1925.

== 1925 Releases ==
A list of Marathi films released in 1925.

Year	Film	Director	Cast	Release date	Production	Notes	Source
1925	Savkari Pash	Baburao Painter	V. Shantaram, Kamladevi, Zunzharrao Pawar, Kishabapu Bakre, K. Dhaiber, Shankarrao Bute			V. Shantaram's acting debut film. Based on Hari Narayan Apte's novel "Savkari Haak" (Call of the Moneylender).	
1925	Simantak Mani	Dhundiraj Govind Phalke	Bhaurao Datar, Krishna Chauhan		Hindustan Cinema Film Company	Silent Film With Marathi intertitles	
1925	Satyabhama	Dhundiraj Govind Phalke	Bhaurao Datar, Krishna Chauhan			Silent Film With Marathi intertitles	
1925	Kakashebanchya Dolyat Jhanjhanit Anjan	Dhundiraj Govind Phalke	Bachu, Sahadev, Krishna Kumbhar		Hindustan Cinema Film Company	Silent Film With Marathi intertitles	
1925	Hidimb Bajkasur Vadha	Dhundiraj Govind Phalke	Bhaurao Datar, B. Pawar, Yamuna Gole		Hindustan Cinema Film Company	Silent Film With Marathi intertitles	
1925	Chaturthicha Chanda	Dhundiraj Govind Phalke	Bhaurao Datar		Hindustan Cinema Film Company	Silent Film With Marathi intertitles	
