= List of Marathi films of 1945 =

A list of films produced by the Marathi language film industry based in Maharashtra in the year 1945.

== 1945 Releases ==
A list of Marathi films released in 1945.

| Year | Film | Director | Cast | Release date | Production | Notes | Source |
|---|---|---|---|---|---|---|---|
| 1945 | Lakharani | Vishram Bedekar | Durga Khote | | | Simultaneously made in Marathi and Hindi | |
| 1945 | Taramati | Raja Nene | Shobhna Samarth | | | Simultaneously made in Marathi and Hindi | |
