= Amrit (1941 film) =

- Theatrical release poster
- Directed by: Master Vinayak
- Written by: V. S. Khandekar
- Starring: Dada Salvi; Baburao Pendharkar; Lalita Pawar; Master Vithal
- Cinematography: Pandurang Naik
- Music by: Dada Chandekar
- Production company: Navyug Chitrapat
- Release date: 1941
- Running time: 152 minutes (Marathi); 162 minutes (Hindi)
- Country: India
- Languages: Marathi; Hindi

Amrit is a 1941 Indian Black-and-white film directed by Master Vinayak and produced by Navyug Chitrapat. The film stars Dada Salvi, Baburao Pendharkar, Lalita Pawar, Master Vithal in the lead roles and Damuanaa Malvankar, Javdekar, Meenakshi, V. Jog in other key roles. The film was made in Marathi and Hindi languages simultaneously.

== Plot ==
In a coastal Konkan village, intricate dynamics of class disparity unfold, anchored by the archetypal Khandekar figure, Bappa, an idealistic yet unbending patriarch ensnared by his convictions. Bappa monopolizes the palm trees, the source of toddy production, staunchly advocating for fairness over leniency. The narrative intertwines with the lives of his urban son Vilas, daughter Lata, and her friend Sadanand, alongside the tumultuous saga of drunken shoemaker Krishna and his wife Seeta. Vilas, harboring desires for Seeta, arranges a new dwelling for the shoemaker's family, sparking familial tensions. Conflicts escalate between Vilas and Bappa, culminating when Vilas inadvertently causes the death of Seeta's daughter, converging multiple storylines. Exploiting his political sway, Bappa wrongfully implicates Seeta's blameless husband, prompting Seeta to retaliate by exploiting Vilas's desires, reducing him to a virtual servant. Ultimately, Bappa confronts his moral obligations, echoing a cautionary tale against the perils of alcoholism.

== Cast ==
- Dada Salvi as Bappa
- Master Vithal as Vilas
- Baburao Pendharkar as Krishna
- Lalita Pawar as Seeta
- Master Vinayak as the son of village patriarch

== Soundtrack ==
The music is composed by Dada Chandekar.

=== Tracks ===
Marathi
No.	Title	Length
1.	"Gai Chandrika Gai"	3:04
2.	"Nahin Ho Koni Pahat"	3:01
3.	"Gume Sakhu Ardh"	3:15
4.	"Murkat Murkat Nauka"	3:12
5.	"Tuiyaa Naynant"	3:08
6.	"Yaare Navya Yugachi"	2:53
