= List of Marathi films of 1927 =

A list of films produced by the Marathi language film industry based in Maharashtra in the year 1927.

== 1927 Releases ==
A list of Marathi films released in 1927.

Year	Film	Director	Cast	Release date	Production	Notes	Source
1927	Rukmini Haran	Dhundiraj Govind Phalke	Bhaurao Datar, Anasura		Hindustan Cinema Film Company	Silent Film With Marathi intertitles	
1927	Rukamangada Mohini	Dhundiraj Govind Phalke	Ganpat G. Shinde, Gangubai Mohite		Hindustan Cinema Film Company	Silent Film With Marathi intertitles	
1927	Nala Damayanti	Dhundiraj Govind Phalke	Salunke, Gotiram, Bachhuram		Hindustan Cinema Film Company	Silent Film With Marathi intertitles	
1927	Hanuman Janma	Dhundiraj Govind Phalke	Bhaurao Datar, Laxman Malusare, Yamuna Gole			Silent Film With Marathi intertitles	
1927	Draupadi Vastraharan	Dhundiraj Govind Phalke	Bhaurao Datar, Bachoba, Gangubai Mohite		Hindustan Cinema Film Company	Silent Film With Marathi intertitles	
1927	Bhakta Sudama	Dhundiraj Govind Phalke	Bhaurao Datar, Kshirsagar		Hindustan Cinema Film Company	Silent Film With Marathi intertitles	
1927	Netaji Palkar	V. Shantaram	Balasaheb Yadav, Anasuya, Zunzharrao Pawar, Mane		Prabhat Films	Silent Film With Marathi intertitles	
