= List of Marathi films of 1926 =

A list of films produced by the Marathi language film industry based in Maharashtra in the year 1926.

== 1926 Releases ==
A list of Marathi films released in 1926.

Year	Film	Director	Cast	Release date	Production	Notes	Source
1926	Sant Eknath	Dhundiraj Govind Phalke	Gotiram, Bhaurao Datar		Hindustan Cinema Film Company	Silent Film With Marathi intertitles	
1926	Ram Rajya Vijay	Dhundiraj Govind Phalke			Hindustan Cinema Film Company	Silent Film With Marathi intertitles	
1926	Janaki Swayamvar	Dhundiraj Govind Phalke			Hindustan Cinema Film Company	Silent Film With Marathi intertitles	
1926	Dhanurbhanga	Dhundiraj Govind Phalke				Silent Film With Marathi intertitles	
1926	Bhakta Pralhad	Dhundiraj Govind Phalke	Bhaurao Datar, B. Pawar, Gangaram Nhavi		Hindustan Cinema Film Company	Silent Film With Marathi intertitles	
1926	Balaji Nimbalkar	Dhundiraj Govind Phalke	Vasant Shinde, Bhaurao Datar, Dattopant Sakte		Hindustan Cinema Film Company	Silent Film With Marathi intertitles	
