= List of Marathi films of 1928 =

A list of films produced by the Marathi language film industry based in Maharashtra in the year 1928.

== 1928 Releases ==
A list of Marathi films released in 1928.

Year	Film	Director	Cast	Release date	Production	Notes	Source
1928	Karna	Vishnupant Govind Damle, Sheikh Fattelal	Keshavrao Dhaiber, Kamaladevi, Ravji Mhaskar			Silent Film With Marathi intertitles	
1928	Shri Krishna Shashti	Dhundiraj Govind Phalke			Hindustan Cinema Film Company	Silent Film With Marathi intertitles	
1928	Parshuram	Dhundiraj Govind Phalke	Bhaurao Datar, Gotiram, Ashrabai		Hindustan Cinema Film Company	Silent Film With Marathi intertitles	
1928	Kumari Millche Shuddhikaran	Dhundiraj Govind Phalke			Hindustan Cinema Film Company	Silent Film With Marathi intertitles	
1928	Bhakta Damaji	Dhundiraj Govind Phalke	Gotiram, Bhaurao Datar		Hindustan Cinema Film Company	Silent Film With Marathi intertitles	
