= Kanyadaan (1960 film) =

- Theatrical release poster
- Directed by: Madhav Shinde
- Screenplay by: G. R. Kamat
- Story by: Mahadevshastri Joshi
- Produced by: Madhav Shinde
- Starring: Usha Kiran; Suryakant; Raja Gosavi; Dada Salvi; Indira Chitnis
- Cinematography: Vasant Shinde
- Edited by: Gangaram Mathaphode
- Music by: Vasant Prabhu
- Production company: Surel Chitra
- Release date: 24 May 1960
- Running time: 138 minutes
- Country: India
- Language: Marathi

Kanyadaan (transl. Giving away the bride) is a 1960 Indian Marathi-language social drama film directed and produced by Madhav Shinde. The film stars Usha Kiran, Suryakant, Raja Gosavi and Dada Salvi in lead roles. At the 8th National Film Awards, The film won National Film Award for Best Feature Film in Marathi.

== Plot ==
The film follows a widowed young woman whose father-in-law supports her decision to remarry. However, his wife and other members of society oppose the marriage because of traditional beliefs. The story centres on the family's struggle between social customs and the widow's right to begin a new life.

== Cast ==
- Usha Kiran as Sumitra
- Dada Salvi as Dadasaheb Inamdar
- Raja Gosavi as Kumar Inamdar
- Suryakant as Sumitra's second husband
- Indira Chitnis as Madarinbai Inamdar
- Vasant Shinde as Balwanta Diwanji
- Neelam
- Vishnupant Jog
- Sardarbhai
- Dr. Ranade
- Baby Chitra
- Baby Rekha
- Baby Ujjwal

== Soundtrack ==
Kanyadaan

Soundtrack album by Vasant Prabhu
- Released: 1960
- Genre: Feature film soundtrack
- Length: 19:17
- Language: Marathi
- Label: Saregama

Official audio
- Kanyadaan- Full Album on YouTube

All tracks are written by P. Savalaram

Track listing
No.	Title	Singer (s)	Length
1.	"Lek Ladki Hya Gharchi"	Lata Mangeshkar	2:40
2.	"Mansicha Chitrakar Toh"	Hridaynath Mangeshkar	3:51
3.	"Jay Devi Mangala Gauri"	Lata Mangeshkar	3:29
4.	"Kokil Kuhu Kuhu Bole"	Lata Mangeshkar	3:24
5.	"Tu Asta Tar"	Lata Mangeshkar	3:11
6.	"Majhiya Nayananchya Kondani"	Lata Mangeshkar	3:18
Total length:			19:18

== Reception ==
The film was a critically and publicly acclaimed Marathi film that achieved a silver-jubilee theatrical run. It won the President's Silver Medal for Best Feature Film in Marathi at the 8th National Film Awards.
