= List of Marathi films of 2008 =

A list of films produced by the Marathi language film industry based in Maharashtra in the year 2008.

== January–March ==
	Opening	Title	Director	Cast	Producer	Notes	Genre	Source
J A N	1	Mi Amruta Boltey	Samruddhi Jadhav	Madhu Kambikar, Madhura Velankar			Drama	
J A N	25	Valu	Umesh Vinayak Kulkarni	Atul Kulkarni, Girish Kulkarni, Bharati Achrekar, Mohan Agashe	Girish Kulkarni, Umesh Vinayak Kulkarni		Comedy film	
F E B	8	Checkmate	Sanjay Jadhav	Sanjay Narvekar, Ankush Choudhary, Swapnil Joshi	Nishad Audio Visuals		Thriller	
M A R	7	Sasu Numbari Jawai Dus Numbari	Vijay Patkar	Makarand Anaspure, Pradnya Jadhav, Nirmiti Sawant	Everest Entertainment		Comedy	
M A R	16	Jawai Maaza Bhala	Adwait Dadarkar	Vikram Gokhale, Amita Khopkar, Jayant Savarkar	Everest Entertainment		Comedy	

== April–June ==
	Opening	Title	Director	Cast	Producer	Notes	Genre	Source
A P R	11	Full 3 Dhamaal	Mahesh Kothare	Makarand Anaspure, Priya Arun, Prasad Oak	Kothare & Kothare Vision		Comedy, Suspense	
A P R	18	Amhi Satpute	Sachin Pilgaonkar	Sachin Pilgaonkar, Supriya Pilgaonkar, Ashok Saraf				
M A Y	16	Sakhi	Sanjay Surkar	Ashok Saraf, Sonali Kulkarni, Subodh Bhave	Shri Chintamani Vision, Everest Entertainment		Drama	
M A Y	16	De Dhakka	Atul Kale, Sudesh Manjrekar	Makarand Anaspure, Shivaji Satam, Siddharth Jadhav	Zee Talkies	First Production by Zee Talkies	Family, Drama, Comedy	
J U N	26	Sanai Choughade	Rajiv Patil	Sai Tamhankar, Santosh Juvekar, Shreyas Talpade, Subodh Bhave, Tushar Dalvi	Everest Entertainment	Shreyas Talpade's first production and Sai Tamhankar's debut film	Drama, Comedy	

== July–September ==
	Opening	Title	Director	Cast	Producer	Notes	Genre	Source
J U L	31	Doghat Tisra Aata Sagala Visara	Kaanchan Adhikkari	Makarand Anaspure, Mohan Joshi, Mrunmayee Lagoo			Comedy	
A U G
S E P	12	Baap Re Baap Dokyala Taap	Kaanchan Adhikkari	Makarand Anaspure, Vandana Gupte, Siddharth Jadhav	Everest Entertainment		Comedy	

== October–December ==
	Opening	Title	Director	Cast	Producer	Notes	Genre	Source
O C T	24	Hari Om Vithala	Saad Dalvi	Makarand Anaspure, Amita Khopkar, Nisha Parulekar	Everest Entertainment		Drama	
N O V	7	Uladhaal	Aditya Sarpotdar	Makarand Anaspure, Subodh Bhave, Ankush Choudhary, Bharat Jadhav, Siddharth Jadhav	Vishwas Chitra		Drama, Thriller	
D E C	18	Ek Daav Dhobhi Pachhad	Satish Rajwade	Ashok Saraf, Mukta Barve, Subodh Bhave, Prasad Oak	Shree Mangesh Films		Comedy	
