= List of Marathi films of 1936 =

A list of films produced by the Marathi language film industry based in Maharashtra in the year 1936.

== 1936 Releases ==
A list of Marathi films released in 1936.

Year	Film	Director	Cast	Release date	Production	Notes	Source
1936	Savkari Pash	Baburao Painter	Vishnupant Aundhkar, Gulabbai, Gopal Mandhare		Shalini Cinetone	This was the first remake of Indian Cinema. It's a remake of 1925 silent Marathi film Savkari Pash. This is also the first realistic movie of Indian Cinema.	
1936	Chhaya	Master Vinayak	Master Vinayak, Leela Chitnis, Indira Wadkar		Huns Pics	Simultaneously made in Marathi and Hindi	
1936	Pundalik	Vishram Bedekar, Vamanrao N. Bhat					
1936	Savitri	Bhalji Pendharkar					
1936	Sant Tukaram	Vishnupant Govind Damle, Sheikh Fattelal	Vishnupant Pagnis, Gauri, B. Nandrekar	24 October 2013 (UK)/12 December 1936 (India)	Prabhat Films	The first Indian film to run in a single theatre for more than a year.Declared one of the best three films at Venice Film Festival	
