= List of Marathi films of 1930 =

A list of films produced by the Marathi language film industry based in Maharashtra in the year 1930.

== 1930 Releases ==
A list of Marathi films released in 1930.

Year	Film	Director	Cast	Release date	Production	Notes	Source
1930	Kabir Kamal	Dhundiraj Govind Phalke			Hindustan Cinema Film Company	Silent Film With Marathi intertitles	
1930	Song of Life	G.P. Pawar	Lalita Pawar			Silent Film With Marathi intertitles	
1930	Shamsher Bahadur	Y.D. Sarpotdar	Lalita Pawar			Silent Film With Marathi intertitles	
1930	Udaykal	Keshavrao Dhaiber, Rajaram Vankudre Shantaram	Rajaram Vankudre Shantaram, Baburao Pendharkar, Kamaladevi		Prabhat Films	Silent Film With Marathi intertitles	
1930	Nand Kumar	V.H. Palnitkar				Silent Film With Marathi intertitles	
1930	Sinbad Khalashi	Ramchandra Gopal Torney				Silent Film With Marathi intertitles	
1930	Lanka	Baburao Painter				Silent Film With Marathi intertitles	
1930	Swajara Doranr	Baburao Pendharkar				Silent Film With Marathi intertitles	
1930	Raj Prapanch	Keshavlal Joshi				Silent Film With Marathi intertitles	
1930	Savati Matsar	Shinde			Hindustan Cinema Film Company	Silent Film With Marathi intertitles	
1930	Rani Saheba	Keshavrao Dhaiber, Rajaram Vankudre Shantaram				Silent Film With Marathi intertitles	
1930	Daivi Khadag	G.P. Pawar				Silent Film With Marathi intertitles	
