= List of Marathi films of 1940 =

A list of films produced by the Marathi language film industry based in Maharashtra in the year 1940.

== 1940 Releases ==
A list of Marathi films released in 1940.

| Year | Film | Director | Cast | Release Date | Production | Notes | Source |
|---|---|---|---|---|---|---|---|
| 1940 | Lagna Pahave Karun | Master Vinayak | Damuanna Malvankar, V.S. Jog, Shakuntala Bhome | | Navyug Chitrapat | | |
| 1940 | Gorakhnath | Bhalji Pendharkar | | | | Simultaneously made in Marathi and Hindi as Alakh Niranjan | |
| 1940 | Lapandav | K. Narayan Kale | Baburao Pendharkar, Master Vinayak, Dada Salvi | | Navyug Chitrapat | | |
| 1940 | Raigad | G.S. Devare, N.G. Devare | | | | | |
| 1940 | Geeta | Parshwanath Yeshwant Altekar | Chandra Mohan, Durga Khote, Anant Marathe | | Circo | Simultaneously made in Marathi and Hindi | |
| 1940 | Ayodhyachi Rani | K.P. Bhave | | | | | |
| 1940 | Ardhangi | Master Vinayak | Baburao Pendharkar, Master Vinayak, Meenakshi | | Huns Pics | Simultaneously made in Marathi and Hindi as Ghar Ki Rani | |
