= List of Marathi films of 1934 =

A list of films produced by the Marathi language film industry based in Maharashtra in the year 1934.

== 1934 Releases ==
A list of Marathi films released in 1934.

Year	Film	Director	Cast	Release date	Production	Notes	Source
1934	Amrut Manthan	Rajaram Vankudre Shantaram	Chandra Mohan, Nalini Tarkhad, Shanta Apte, G. R. Mane		Prabhat Films		
1934	Akashwani	Bhalji Pendharkar	Leela, Nanasaheb Phatak, Master Vinayak		Kolhapur Cinetone		
1934	Partha Kumar	Bhalji Pendharkar	Shakuntala Paranjpye, Sohani, Master Vasant			Simultaneously made in Marathi and Hindi	
1934	Bhakta Pralhad	K.P. Bhave					
1934	Shakakarta Shivaji	Nagendra Majumdar					
1934	Krishna Arjun Yudh	Vishram Bedekar, Vamanrao N.Bhat, Chintamanrao Kolhatkar				Simultaneously made in Marathi and Hindi	
1934	Chhatrapati Sambhaji	Parshwanath Yeshwant Altekar	Master Vithal			Simultaneously made in Marathi and Hindi	
