= Hansa Wadkar =

Indian stage and film actress

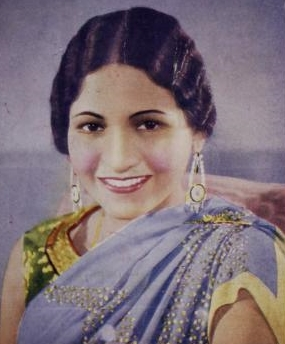
- Still from film Navjeevan (1939)
- Born: Ratan Salgaokar; 1923; Bombay, Maharashtra, British India
- Died: 1971 (aged 47–48); Bombay, Maharashtra, India
- Occupation: actress
- Years active: 1936–1968
- Spouse: Jagannath Bandarkar (m. 1937; sep. 1945)
- Children: 1 daughter, Rekha

Hansa Wadkar (1923–1971) was a Marathi and Hindi film and stage actress. She started her acting career in Indian cinema at the age of thirteen years, as a heroine in the bilingual film Vijaychi Lagne (1936). Wadkar went on to make a name for herself working in reputable film companies like Bombay Talkies, Prabhat Film Company and National Studios. Her career-defining role was in Vishnupant Damle's Sant Sakhu (1941) where she enacted the role of the female saint Sakhu. Her other memorable roles are in the Tamasha genre films like Lokshahir Ram Joshi (1947), termed as the "Classic Marathi Tamasha musical" and Sangtye Aika (1959), another of Marathi cinema's "best known Tamasha films". The title "Sangtye Aika" (You Ask, I Tell) was used by Wadkar for her autobiography compiled in 1971. The autobiography was initially serialised in the Marathi magazine Manoos helped by journalist Arun Sadhu.

She has been referred to as "one of the most sought after and bohemian actresses of her time". Wadkar underwent personal difficulties in her life, which included marital problems, addiction to alcohol, humiliation at several levels and rape at the hands of a magistrate, when seeking to get out of a troubled relationship. Her marriage ended in a separation and her daughter was kept away from her.

Bhumika (The Role) (1977) directed by Shyam Benegal, is based on Hansa Wadkar's autobiography and has actress Smita Patil playing Wadkar in the film. The film won two National Awards, Best Actress for Smita Patil and Best Screenplay for Satyadev Dubey, Shyam Benegal and Girish Karnad. The film also won the Best Film at the 25th Filmfare Awards.

== Early life ==
Wadkar was born Ratan Bhalchander Salgaokar, on 24 January 1923 at Dr. Bhalerao Hospital in Bombay, Maharashtra, India. Her father, Bhalchander Salgaokar, was the son and grandson of "kalavantins, courtesans renowned for their musical accomplishments". Her mother, Saraswati, was the daughter of a Devdasi. Wadkar was the third of four children. The oldest sister and the youngest brother died, leaving a second child, her brother Mohan and her. In her autobiography Wadkar mentions that her great-grandmother, Baybai Salgaokar, called Jiji by the family, was a wealthy courtesan who was an influential figure in the family. Marriage in the courtesan community was a rarity and Wadkar's grandfather Raghunath Salgaokar (Jiji's son) was the first in the family to marry.

Jiji divided the vast property she had and Wadkar's father was given the house in Sawantwadi. The mother, father, brother and young Wadkar shifted there and she joined a Marathi medium school where she studied till class IV. She also studied vocal music under Bhagwatbuwa but was not interested in singing. The family returned to Bombay and Hansa attended an English medium school for two years at Aryan Education Society School. However, she had to leave school when the family faced financial problems. Her father had turned into an alcoholic and there was no money coming in the house. Her mother insisted that Mohan, being a boy, should continue his studies, and thus Wadkar had to find work.

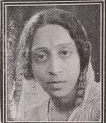
Indira Wadkar, Hansa Wadkar's paternal aunt (1939)

The influence of films was present from an early time. Wadkar's father had three sisters, Kesharbai, Indirabai and Sushilabai. Sushila was married to Master Vinayak, a renowned actor-director of the early era of Indian cinema. Kesharbai and Indira Wadkar were acting in films and Indira was a classical singer as well. Indira acted in several films including Duniya Kya Hai (Resurrection) (1937) and in Vinayak's production company "Hans Films" like Devata (1939) in Marathi. Indira used the surname Wadkar to avoid using the family name Salgaokar, for fear of reprisal from society against women acting in films. Kesharbai, who was working in a film being made by M.G. Rangnekar, suggested that Wadkar work in films to financially sustain her family.

== Career ==
In 1936, Wadkar acted in her first role as a heroine in Bapubhai Pendharkar's Vijayche Lagane. A bilingual, made in Marathi and Hindi (Shadi Ka Maamla), it was directed by Mama Warerkar. The film was produced by Pendharkar's Lalit Kala Production, its "first and last" film, as Pendharkar died soon after. When her brother objected to the family name being used in films, her name was changed from Ratan to Hansa, and the surname Wadkar was borrowed from her actress aunt, Indira Wadkar. Her salary at that time was Rs. 250 per month. The film was a success at the box office.

Wadkar worked in a few films after this for different companies, which remained incomplete. She then joined Golden Eagle Movietone and learned Hindi from a Hindi scholar appointed for her by the company. She became proficient in the language, working in several Hindi films at the time like Meena, Prem Patra, Zamana, and Raj Kumar with Chetan Anand.

Marrying in 1937, she had to return to films once again due to a shortage of money. She acted in two stunt films in Bhagwan Palav, having joined Harishchandrarao's company. The films were Bahadur Kisan and Criminal which were released in 1939. In 1938, she was cast in Zamana directed by Ram Daryani, starring Padma Devi who had earlier acted in India's first indigenous colour film, Kisan Kanya. Her co-stars were Dar (Jeevan) Gulab, Ameena and Amirbai Karnataki.

=== Bombay Talkies ===
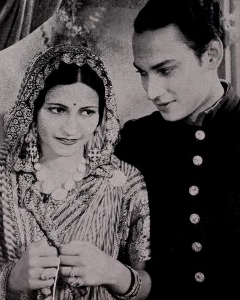
Hansa Wadkar and Rama Shukul in Navjeevan (1939)

She joined Bombay Talkies, signing a contract for six years. She enjoyed the efficiency and camaraderie of Bombay Talkies. Her first film with them was Navjeevan, directed by Franz Osten and released in 1939. The April 1939 issue of Filmindia commented on the absence of Devika Rani in the film, while mentioning Wadkar, "Bombay Talkies have given a beautiful story as usual, framed in a more beautiful technique. And once again we don't find Devika Rani in the cast. This time, however, a new girl has been introduced in Hansa Wadkar, new in the sense that for the first time she has been allowed to shoulder the heroine's role".

Her next two films were Durga (1939) directed by Franz Osten, and Azad (1940) directed by N. R. Acharya. Following the death of Himanshu Rai in 1940, she asked Devika Rani to release her from her contract. Devika Rani tore up the contract, though she still had three more years.

=== Prabhat Film Company ===
Wadkar signed a temporary contract with Prabhat Film Company and later wrote that the years she spent at Prabhat "were the most memorable ones of my life".

Wadkar then appeared in Sant Sakhu (1941), directed by Vishnupant Damle, Sheikh Fatelal and Raja Nene. It co-starred Gauri as Sakhu's cruel mother-in-law along with Shankar Kulkarni, Shanta Majumdar and Chhotu. The music was by Keshavrao Bhole. He was not happy with Wadkar's voice, so Vinodini Dixit's voice was used as a playback singer for her. Wadkar was emotionally affected by the role. She said "Sakhu's role has left lasting memories". She immersed herself completely in the role that "I forgot my own existence".

A bilingual made both in Marathi and Hindi by the Prabhat banner, Ram Shastri (1944) was a historical biopic about the 18th-century Chief Justice Ram Shastri. The directors were Vishram Bedekar, Gajanan Jagirdar and Raja Nene. Master Vithal, Lalita Pawar, Keshavrao Bhole also feature with Jagirdar playing the title role. As she did not know dancing, Wadkar had to undergo training for her role as a tamasha dancer.

=== National Studios ===
Apna Paraya (1942) was directed by Ramachandra Thakur and produced by National Studios. It co-starred Shahu Modak, Urmila and Sankatha Prasad with Wadkar. The story was by Khatib and the music was by Anil Biswas.

Her next film with National Studios was Mera Gaon (1942). Made under the Laxmi Productions' banner it was directed by Prafulla Roy. The cast included P. Jairaj, Chhaya Devi, Agha and K. C. Dey who also composed the music. Wadkar was three months pregnant while shooting for the film. In one of the scenes a horse came charging at her while she lay prone on the ground. A few women were watching the shooting, including actress Miss Moti and they threw themselves on top of her bearing the brunt of the horse's hooves. She was eight months pregnant when the film's shooting ended. She went on to deliver a normal, healthy daughter, her "first living child" after several miscarriages.

=== Rajkamal Kalamandir ===
Lokshahir Ram Joshi (1947) made in Marathi and Hindi was co-directed by V. Shantaram and Baburao Painter for Rajkamal Kalamandir. Originally directed by Painter, Shantaram was completed after the shooting when Painter fell sick. The film starred Jayaram Shiledar as Ram Joshi and Hansa Wadkar as Baya. It has music by Vasant Desai, with lyrics by Ram Joshi and G. D. Madgulkar. Termed as the "Classic Marathi Tamasha musical", it is a biopic of the poet, kirtan, and lavani performer Ram Joshi (1758-1812) set in the Peshwa period. The "vibrant lavnis" and "sawaal-jawabs" (musical question and answer sessions) became a "trend-setter", while the music and dances "enthralled" the audience.

=== Later years ===
Pudhache Paool (The Next Step) (1950) directed by Raja Paranjpe for Manik Studios, Pune, is about a young man who runs away from his poverty-stricken family to find a better life for himself. He meets a Tamasha dancer who is only interested in money. The cast includes Wadkar, Kusum Deshpande, Shakuntala Jadave and P. L. Deshpande. The music was composed by Sudhir Phadke. Wadkar acted in the film as her husband, Bandarkar, had signed the contract for her. She stated that from "an artistic point" her role as a tamasha dancer in this film was "superior to that of Baya in Ram Joshi.

Mee Tulas Tuzya Angani (I Am A Tulsi Plant in Your Courtyard) in 1955, was directed by Raja Thakur for Navchitra Films and had Wadkar in a vamp's role. The film won the National Film Award for Best Feature Film in Marathi and Best Director in 1956. Wadkar considered her role as a tamasha dancer in the film as the best.

Sangtye Aika (1959) was directed by Anant Mane and stars Wadkar and Jayshree Gadkar. One of Marathi cinema's most famous Tamasha films, it was a "major hit". The film also gave Jayshree Gadkar one of her first big roles. With story by G. G. Parthi, screenplay by Vyankatesh Madgulkar and songs by Ga. Di. Madgulkar, the film went on to have a hundred and thirty-one week run in Pune.

The four films Wadkar held dear are Sant Sakhu (1941), Lokshahir Ram Joshi (1947), Pudhache Paool (1950) and Mee Tulas Tuzya Angani (1955) as they "marked four important stages" in her film career.

== Personal life ==
Jagannath Bandarkar was one of the sons of a neighbour at Sawantwadi. His family was deemed to be of a "lower caste" than the Wadkars. Being ten years older than Wadkar, her brother and other family members did not approve of her closeness to him. However, her mother would ask her to call him over for lunch or do odd jobs. When the Wadkars shifted to Bombay, Bandarkar followed. Having failed at setting up a printing press, he started a theatre company called Dominic Union and got Wadkar to join it. Her mother accused her of having an affair with Bandarkar, which Wadkar thought was an unfair accusation. She writes of assuming a defiant and oppositional attitude later on too, when wrongly accused. Soon she was three months pregnant at age fifteen and Bandarkar and Wadkar were married on 6 September 1937, at Kittebhandari Marriage Hall in Bombay. Though she had "dreamed of a family life", she had to resume work as Bandarkar's company was financially unstable. She also had a miscarriage at this time.

Rekha, their daughter, was born following the completion of Wadkar's film Mera Gaon (1942). Over time when her husband physically abused her over some imagined wrongdoing, she would go out and do it. She started drinking and describes one drinking session in her autobiography where she was unaware of what took place. She found herself in a village where Joshi, one of the men she had been drinking with, brought her as his third wife. She stayed virtually imprisoned there for three years, till she was able to smuggle a letter out to her husband. He arrived with the police and took her to the magistrate's office in the neighbouring town, where she had to testify. The magistrate sent Bandarkar to get a signature on a paper and then proceeded to rape Wadkar. Since she did not speak out about the incident, no action was taken.

She went on to perform in several plays, where she met Rajan Jawale, an actor, with whom she formed a bond that lasted till her death. She maintained a good relationship with all the female workers. Some of them became good friends like Lalita Devulkar.

Hansa Wadkar died on 23 August 1971 in Bombay Maharashtra, India.

== Autobiography and film ==
Wadkar's autobiography started off as a series of interviews conducted by journalist Arun Sadhu, for the Marathi magazine Manoos. The book form "Sangtye Aika" was published in 1970. On release, "it caused a sensation and became an instant best-seller". It received the State Government Award for Best Autobiography in 1971. The book was edited and translated into English as "You Ask, I Tell" by Jasbir Jain and Shobha Shinde.

Bhumika (1977) was Shyam Benegal's fourth film as a director. Based on "Sangtye Aika", the film shows her past in black and white, and her present in colour. This had more to do with financial issues regarding raw colour stock. "To portray the Marathi milieu" he had Girish Karnad to help out with the script and Satyadev Dubey's help for dialogues. The film shows her bound in a patriarchal society, exploited by family, husband, director and Kale. The names used in the film were changed, Hansa was Usha, Bandarkar was Keshav Dalvi, Joshi as Kale, while only Rajan her co-star from films and stage, remains the same. The film went on to garner awards for Best actress, screenplay and Best film.

== Bibliography ==
- Sangtye Aika; by Hansa Wadkar; in Marathi. Rajhans Prakashan, 1970. ISBN 978-81-7434-154-9
- You Ask, I Tell: an autobiography, by Hansa Wadkar. English translation by Jasbir Jain and Shobha Shinde. Zubaan Books, 2014. ISBN 978-93-83074-68-6
- Hört zu, ich erzähle! Aus dem Leben einer indischen Schauspielerin, by Hansa Wadkar. German translation by Adele Hennig-Tembe. Draupadi Verlag, 2020. ISBN 978-3-945191-51-4

== Filmography ==
List:

Year	Film	Director	Cast	Composer	Studio/Producer
1936	Vijayachi Lagne (Shaadi Ka Maamla in Hindi)	Mama Warerkar	Master Chhotu, Bapu Pendharkar		M. Thakker
1937	Modern Youth (Jung-E-Jawani)	D. T. Shivdasani, C. N. Lala	Benjamin, Naveen Yagnik, S. Nazir	Sundardas Bhatia	
1938	Bahadur Kisan	Chandrarao Kadam, Bhagwan	Bhagwan, Indira Wadkar, Chandrarao, Vasantrao, P. Varne	Mir Sahib	Chandra Art
1938	Sneh Lagna (Love Marriage)	Chandrarao Kadam	Chandarrao, Shyam Sunder, Ansuya, Jeevan	Mulraj Kapadia	Chandra Art
1938	Zamana (The Times)	Ram Daryani	Padma Devi, Gulab, Amirbai Karnatki, Omkar Dar (Jeevan), Gope, Ameena	Sunder Das	Krishna Movies
1939	Navjeevan (New Life)	Franz Osten	Rama Shukul, V. H. Desai, Saroj Borkar, Mumtaz Ali, P. F. Pithawala, Lalita Devulkar	Saraswati Devi	Bombay Talkies
1939	Durga	Franz Osten	Devika Rani, Rama Shukul, Vishnupant Aundhkar, P. F. Pithawala, Mumtaz Ali, Nana Palsikar, V. H. Desai	Saraswati Devi	Bombay Talkies
1940	Azad	N. R. Acharya	Leela Chitnis, Ashok Kumar, Rama Shukul, Mumtaz Ali	Saraswati Devi, Ramchandra Pal	Bombay Talkies
1939	Criminal	Bhagwan	Bhagwan, Chandrarao, Sunetra, Vasantrao, Masood	A. Hussain	Chandra Art
1941	Sant Sakhu	Vishnu Govind Damle, Sheikh Fatelal, Raja Nane	Gouri, Shankar Kulkarni, Shanta Majumdar, Chhotu	Keshavrao Bhole	Prabhat Film Company
1942	Apna Paraya	Ramachandra Thakur	Shahu Modak, Sankatha Prasad, Pesi Patel, Agha, Kayamali, Dulari	Anil Biswas	National Studios
1942	Mera Gaon (My Village)	Prafulla Roy	Chhaya Devi, K. C. Dey, P. Jairaj, Agha, Jagdish Sethi, Amir Banu	K. C. Dey	Laxmi Productions
1942	Dillagi	Balwant Bhatt	Kumar, Anuradha, Gulab, Agha	Pratap Mukherji	Pragati Chitra
1944	Meena	Phani Majumdar	Vasanti, Wasti, Dixit, Ratan Piya, Gulab	H. P. Das	Bharat Productions
1944	Ram Shastri	Gajanan Jagirdar, Raja Nene, Vishram Bedekar	Gajanan Jagirdar, Master Vithal, Anant Marathe, Baby Shakuntala, Meenakshi, Lalita Pawar, Sudha Apte	Keshavrao Bhole, G. Damle	Prabhat Film Company
1945	Main Kya Karun	Ninu Majumdar	Pahari Sanyal, Suraiya, Shah Nawaz, Bikram Kapoor, E. Bilimoria	Nino Majumdar	Flora Films
1945	Aarti	Ramachandra Thakur	Vanmala, Surendra, Harish, Sheikh Mukhtar, Kanhaiyalal	Ashok Ghosh, Ali Bux	Screen Attractions Corp
1946	Behram Khan	Gajanan Jagirdar	Gajanan Jagirdar, Mehtab, Lalita Pawar, Suresh, David, Benjamin	Ghulam Haider	Standard Pictures
1947	Lokshahir Ram Joshi	Baburao Painter, V. Shantaram	Jayaram Shiledar, Shakuntala, Parashuram, G. D. Madgulkar, Sudha Apte	Vasant Desai	Rajkamal Kalamandir
1947	Gaurav	K. J. Parmar	Zeenat, Pratap Kumar, Damayanti, Ghanshyam	Shanti Kumar	Mukti Productions
1948	Mere Lal	Bal Gajbar	Chandrakant, Pratima Devi, Ram Upadhyay	Purshottam	Maharashtra Ch.
1948	Dhanyavad	Gajanan Jagirdar	Gajanan Jagirdar, Lalita Pawar, Sajjan, Leela Misra, Agha, Bikram Kapoor	A. R. Qureshi	Kalpana Pictures
1949	Pandharicha Patil	Raja Pandit			
1949	Sant Janabai	Govind B. Ghanekar	Shakuntala, Abhyankar, Gouri, Balakram, Javdekar	Sudhir Phadke	Prabhat Film Company
1949	Shilanganache Sone (Shilanga's Gold)	Bhal G. Pendharkar	Shanta Apte, Baburao Pendharkar, Suryakant, Master Vithal		
1950	Pudhcha Paool	Raja Paranjape	P. L. Deshpande, G. D. Madgulkar, Kusum Deshpande, Vivek, Mohammad Hussain, Raja Paranjape, Shakuntala Jadhave	Sudhir Phadke	Manik Studio
1950	Sonyachi Lanka	Shrikant Sutar			
1950	Kalyan Khajina	Balasaheb Pathak	Durga Khote, Baburao Pendharkar		
1950	Navara Baiko	Bal Gajbar	Hansa Wadkar		
1950	Shri Krishna Darshan	A. R. Sheik	Durga Khote, Anant Marathe, Usha Kiran, Baby Shakuntala	Sudhir Phadke	Vijay Pictures
1951	Sri Krishna Satya Bhama	Raja Paranjape	Shahu Modak, Poornima, Anant Marathe, Sulochana	Keshavrao Bhole	Manik Studio
1951	Maya Machhindra	Aspi	Nirupa Roy, Trilok Kapoor, Surendra, Usha Kiran, Amirbai Karnatki	Premnath	Super Pictures
1951	Hee Mazhi Laxmi	Pralhad Keshav Atre	Shahu Modak		
1951	Patlache Por (The Headman's Daughter)	Dinkar Patil			
1954	Khel Chalala Nashibacha	Shrikant Sutar	Durga Khote		
1955	Mee Tulas Tujhya Aangani	Raja Thakur	Shahu Modak		
1957	Naikinicha Sazza (The Courtesan's Verandah)	Bhalji Pendharkar	Baburao Pendharkar, Master Vithal		
1959	Sangtye Aika	Anant Mane	Sulochana, Jayshree Gadkar, Ratnamala, Neelam, Chandrakant, Suryakant	Vasant Pawar	Chetana Chitra
1961	Manini (A Woman With Pride)	Anant Mane	Jayshree Gadkar, Chandrakant Gokhale, Dada Salvi, Vasant Shinde	Vasant Pawar	Kala Chitra
1961	Rangapanchami (Festival of Colours)	Anant Mane	Jayshree Gadkar, Suryakant		
1963	Naar Nirmite Nara (Woman Creates Man)	Anant Mane			
1966	Hi Naar Rupasundari	Prabhakar Nayak	Jayshree Gadkar, Suryakant		
1967	Shrimant Mehuna Pahije	A. Shamsheer	Jayshree Gadkar, Damuanna Malvankar	M. Shafi	H. S. Films
1968	Dharmakanya	Madhav Shinde	Anupama, Ratnamala, Vasant Shinde, Chandrakant, Rajshekhar, Vasant Latkar	Hridaynath Mangeshkar	Rajlaxmi Chitra
