= List of Marathi films of 1937 =

A list of films produced by the Marathi language film industry based in Maharashtra in the year 1937.

== 1937 Releases ==
A list of Marathi films released in 1937.

Year	Film	Director	Cast	Release date	Production	Notes	Source
1937	Kunku	Rajaram Vankudre Shantaram	Shanta Apte, Keshavrao Date, Raja Nene		Prabhat Films	Based on the Marathi novel, "Na Patnari Goshta" & screenplay by Narayan Hari Apte, was shown at the Venice International Film Festival. Simultaneously made in Marathi and Hindi as Duniya Na Mane	
1937	Kanhopatra	Bhalji Pendharkar	Leela, Chintamanrao Kolhatkar, Indubala		Shalini Cinetone		
1937	Gangavataran	Madhukar Bavdekar, Dhundiraj Govind Phalke	Chitnis, Suresh Pardesi, Kusum Deshpande		Kolhapur Cinetone	Dadasaheb Phalke's last film. Simultaneously made in Marathi and Hindi	
1937	Dharmaveer	Master Vinayak	Ratnaprabha, Master Vinayak, Baburao Pendharkar		Huns Pics	Simultaneously made in Marathi and Hindi	
1937	Sadhvi Meerabai	Baburao Painter					
