= List of Marathi films of 1921 =

A list of films produced by the Marathi language film industry based in Maharashtra in the year 1921.

== 1921 Releases ==
A list of Marathi films released in 1921.

Year	Film	Director	Cast	Release date	Production	Notes	Source
1921	Surekha Haran	Baburao Painter	Vishnupant Pagnis, Rajaram Vankudre Shantaram			Silent Film	
1921	Govardhan Dhari	G. V. Sane			Hindustan Cinema Film Company	Silent Film	
1921	Shani Prabhav	G. V. Sane			Hindustan Cinema Film Company	Silent Film	
1921	Vikram Satvapariksha	G. V. Sane			Hindustan Cinema Film Company	Silent Film	
1921	Sati Sulochana	G. V. Sane			Hindustan Cinema Film Company	Silent Film	
1921	Valmiki	G. V. Sane			Hindustan Cinema Film Company	Silent Film	
1921	Govardhan Dhari	G. V. Sane			Hindustan Cinema Film Company	Silent Film	
1921	Sati Madalasa	Shree Nath Patankar				Silent Film	
1921	Urvashi	V. P. Divekar				Silent Film	
1921	Raja Gopichand	V. P. Divekar				Silent Film	
1921	Tridandi Sanyas	V. P. Divekar				Silent Film	
1921	Pradyumna	V. P. Divekar				Silent Film	
1921	Sharashandri	Baburao Pendharkar				Silent Film	
1921	Tukaram	Shinde		15 July 1921 (India)	Hindustan Cinema Film Company	Silent Film	
1921	Pundalik	Shinde			Hindustan Cinema Film Company	Silent Film	
