= List of Marathi films of 1931 =

A list of films produced by the Marathi language film industry based in Maharashtra in the year 1931.

== 1931 Releases ==
A list of Marathi films released in 1931.

Year	Film	Director	Cast	Release date	Production	Notes	Source
1931	Chandrasena	Keshavrao Dhaiber, Rajaram Vankudre Shantaram			Prabhat Films	Silent Film With Marathi intertitles	
1931	Shri Krishna Maya	G.V. Sane	Lalita Pawar		Prabhat Films	Silent Film With Marathi intertitles	
1931	Rani Rupmati	Bhalji Pendharkar				Silent Film With Marathi intertitles	
