= Suryakant =

Suryakant is a given name. Notable people with the name include:

- Suryakant Acharya, Indian politician
- Suryakant Dhasmana, Indian politician
- Suryakant Lonkar, Indian politician
- Suryakant Mandhare, Indian actor
- Suryakant Pradhan, Indian cricketer
- Suryakant Tripathi 'Nirala', Indian singer
