= Ram Gabale =

Indian filmmaker (1924–2009)

- Born: Ram Narayan Gabale; 1924
- Died: 9 January 2009 (aged 84–85); Pune, India
- Occupation: Filmmaker
- Known for: Social documentaries
- Spouse: Meera Gabale
- Children: 2

Ram Gabale (died 9 January 2009) was an Indian filmmaker. He is well known for a number of cinematic works including social documentaries, children's films, and television serials. He started directing films in 1947. Gabale worked with critically acclaimed artists including film director V. Shantaram, Marathi writer P.L. Deshpande, and British actor and filmmaker Richard Attenborough. Gabale, originally from Kolhapur, moved to Mumbai and worked with the Rajkamal Studios. He soon obtained a break as a director at the Prabhat Studios in Pune. At Prabhat Studios, he directed his first movie Vande Mataram (1948) starring P.L. Deshpande and his wife Sunita, when he was 24 years old.

Prior to that, Gabale worked as an assistant director to well-known directors including Master Vinayak and V. Shantaram. His works included films like Mothi Manse, Dev Pavla, Dev Bappa, Chota Jawan, and Dharti-Akash. He also assisted the late P.L. Deshpande as a director on the popular television serial Batatyachi Chaal.

Gabale was a creative director who explored social themes that were hitherto unexplored during his time including one on working women called Postatil Mulgi as well a number of social documentaries exploring the socioeconomic spectrum of post-colonial India. Many of his films went on to win awards at the national and international level including a Mahrashtra state award for a documentary on Maharshi Karve, the Prime Minister's gold medal for children's film Phool aur Kaliyan, the Leipzig International Film Festival for Kale-Gore, and the Venice Film Festival for Jaldeep. Gabale also was the recipient of a special recognition from India Gandhi for his film Shatayu Kesari.

He held positions at prominent Indian cinematic institutions including the vice-principal at the Film and Television Institute of India (FTII) as well as Film City in Goregaon and Films Division in Mumbai.

== Filmography ==
=== Director ===
- Vande Mataram (1948)
- Postatil Mulgi (1954)
- Maharshi Karve (documentary)
- Phool aur Kaliyan (1960) (children's film)
- Kale-Gore
- Jaldeep
- Shatayu Kesari

=== Assistant director ===
- Mothi Manse (1949)
- Dev Pavla (1950)
- Dev Bappa
- Chota Jawan
- Dharti-Akash
- Batatyachi Chaal (television serial)
