= Dinkar Patil =

Indian politician (1926–2013)

Loknete Dinkar Balu Patil

Cabinet Minister Government of Maharashtra
- In office 14 March 1995 – 31 January 1999
- Governor: P. C. Alexander
- Chief Minister: Manohar Joshi
- DY Chief Minister: Gopinath Munde
- Ministry and Departments: Protocol; Disaster Management
- Preceded by: Padamsinh Bajirao Patil (Protocol); Abhaysinh Raje Bhosale (Disaster Management)
- Succeeded by: Narayan Rane (Protocol); Gopinath Munde (Disaster Management)

9th Leader of the Opposition Maharashtra Vidhan Sabha
- In office 7 April 1972 – 17 July 1977
- Governor: Ali Yavar Jung
- Speaker: S. K. Wankhede
- Chief Minister: Vasantrao Naik
- Preceded by: Krishnarao Dhulap
- Succeeded by: Ganpatrao Deshmukh

Member of Maharashtra Legislative Council
- In office 8 July 1992 – 7 July 1998
- Constituency: Elected by Maharashtra Legislative Assembly

Member of Parliament, Lok Sabha
- In office 1984-1989
- Preceded by: A.T. Patil
- Succeeded by: Abdul Rahman Antulay
- Constituency: Kolaba
- In office 1977–1980
- Preceded by: Shankarrao Savant
- Succeeded by: A.T. Patil

Member of Maharashtra Legislative Assembly
- In office (1962-1967), (1967-1972), (1972-1977), (1980 – 1985)
- Preceded by: constituency established
- Succeeded by: Dattatray Patil
- Constituency: Panvel

Personal details
- Born: Dinkar Balu Patil; 13 January 1926 Jasai, Uran, Maharashtra, India
- Died: 24 June 2013 (aged 87) Panvel, Maharashtra, India
- Party: Peasants and Workers Party of India
- Occupation: Lawyer, social activist, politician

Dinkar Balu Patil (13 January 1926 – 24 June 2013) also known as D.B. Patil was an Indian lawyer, politician, and social activist. He was a senior member of the Peasants and Workers Party of India. He worked with the local farmers of Navi Mumbai for getting right price of their land which was to be purchased by CIDCO for building the new planned city.

== Early life and education ==
Patil was born on January 13, 1926, in Jasai Village, Uran. He studied art and law, practicing the latter from 1951 to 1956 before being elected to the Maharashtra Legislative Assembly in 1957.

== Social and political activism ==
Patil focused on aiding the farmers of Uran Taluk in Raigad District, Maharashtra. He was sentenced to one year's imprisonment in 1958 for participation in the satyagraha on the issue of border disputes between the states of Maharashtra and Karnataka. He also took part in the movement for formation of the Samyukta Maharashtra. He became a member of the Central Secretariat of Peasants and Workers Party in 1957 and was appointed its general secretary in January 1983.

Navi Mumbai was set up in 1970 on CIDCO farmer's land. But Mr. Patil brought all the farmers together in their fields and gave them fair rates for their farm lands. In 1984, 5 farmers died in the agitation but in the end, they succeeded. And provided 12.50% land for project-affected people and CIDCO allotted 40 sq. ft. Meter land per lease farmers and other workers. This brought justice to the farmers and other workers in Navi Mumbai.

In 1990, he played a pivotal role in maintaining peace in Maharashtra. He is 5 times MLA,1 time MLC,2 times MP, one time Kulaba local board member and one time City President in his political career.
