= Vishram Bedekar =

Indian writer and film director

Vishwanath Chintamani Bedekar
- Born: 13 August 1906; Amravati, Bombay Presidency, British India
- Died: 30 October 1998 (aged 92); Pune, Maharashtra, India
- Other name: Vishram Bedekar
- Spouse: Malati Bedekar
- Children: Shrikant Bedekar

Vishwanath Chintamani Bedekar (13 August 1906 – 30 October 1998), who professionally used the name Vishram Bedekar, was an Indian Marathi-language writer and film director.

Bedekar was born on 13 August 1906, in Amravati. After receiving his college degree in Amravati, he went to Nagpur for his post-graduate studies. During his college days, he was drawn to English literature and theater. He moved to Pune in the 1930s. In 1938, he married Malati Bedekar, (whose maiden name was Balutai Khare).

== Literary work ==
In 1939, Bedekar wrote his only novel Ranangan. It portrayed romantic love between an Indian youth and a German Jewish girl against the backdrop of World War II, and created a storm in literary circles in his times, and was translated into English in 2021. The novel was based on Bedekar's own experience on an ocean voyage in 1938 from Europe to India in which he encountered a number of Jews fleeing German persecution. Bedekar received in 1985 a Sahitya Akademi Award for his autobiographical Ek Jhad Ani Don Pakshi. He presided over Marathi Sahitya Sammelan in Bombay in 1988.

Bedekar wrote several plays:

- Brahma Kumari (A mythological play with contemporary relevance)
- Naro Wa Kunjaro Wa
- Waje Paul Apule
- Tilak Ani Agarkar

The last play depicted the emotional and intellectual conflict between Bal Gangadhar Tilak and Gopal Ganesh Agarkar.

== Movie Direction ==
Bedekar took a course in cinematography in the U.K. He directed many Marathi and Hindi films. Few of the notable movies are :

- Thakiche Lagna
- Satyache Prayog
- Vasudeo Balwant
- Naradnardi
- Krushnarjun Yuddha
- Chool Ani Mool
- Ramshastri
- Pahila Palna
- Andheri Duniya (Hindi) (1936)
- Lakharani (Hindi) (1945)
- Talaash (Hindi) 1957
- Do Bhai (Hindi) (1961)
- Rustom Sohrab (Hindi) (1963)
- Ek Nanhi Munni Ladki Thi (Hindi) (1970)
- Bharat Ke Shaheed (Hindi) (1972)
