= Anant Mane =

Indian film director

- Born: Anant Govind Mane; 22 September 1915; Kolhapur, Bombay Presidency
- Died: 9 May 1995 (aged 79)
- Occupation: Film Director

Anant Mane (22 September 1915 - 9 May 1995) was a film director who directed approximately 60 movies during the golden era of Marathi cinema. He was known for making films based on the folk art form Tamasha, and also directed a number of family melodramas. Mane was the recipient of 3 National Film Awards and 7 Maharashtra State Film Awards. He teamed up with the music director Vasant Pawar and directed several hit movies in the 1960s, 1970s and 1980s.

Mane's 1961 film Manini won the President's Silver Medal for best regional film of the year. In 2006, the Lokmanch Charitable Trust, Kolhapur, instituted an annual Anant Mane award for outstanding contribution to the Marathi film industry.

== Early life ==
Anant Mane was born on 22 September 1915 in Kolhapur, Maharashtra. His interest in the film industry was sparked during his youth due to his uncle, Gyanoba Mane, a wrestler who worked as an actor at the Prabhat Studio in Kolhapur. Accompanying his uncle to the studio, Mane became drawn to the filmmaking environment, which eventually led him to discontinue his formal school education.

On June 1, 1930, Mane officially joined Prabhat Studio, initially working in the laboratory department. He worked without remuneration for the first year and five months before transitioning to a paid position with a monthly salary of ten rupees. During his tenure at Prabhat Studio, Mane gained foundational experience across various departments by observing and participating in film editing, art design, cinematography, sound recording, and crowd scenes, which helped develop his technical and artistic understanding of cinema.

== Career ==
=== Early Technical Training and Prabhat Film Company (1930–1942) ===
Mane began his career at the Prabhat Film Company on June 1, 1930, initially working in the laboratory department. He gained a wide range of experience by observing operations in film editing, art design, cinematography, sound recording, and crowd coordination. During this period, he closely observed the directorial and editing techniques of V. Shantaram. Mane made a brief onscreen appearance as Vishnu in India's first color talkie, Sairandhri (1933), a joint venture between V. Shantaram and Prabhat.

When Prabhat Film Company relocated its operations to Pune, Mane moved with the studio and transitioned to the editing department in 1933. Under Shantaram's mentorship, he worked as an editor on several of the company's major productions, including Amrit Manthan (1934), Chandrasena (1935), Amrit Sena, and Dharmatma (1935). He remained with the studio through the production of notable films like Manoos (1938), Sant Tukaram (1936), Shejari (1941), and Sant Dnyaneshwar (1940). Following internal disagreements among Prabhat's partners, V. Shantaram left the company in 1942, and Mane's formal contract with the studio concluded the following year.

=== Collaborations and Transition to Direction (1943–1949) ===
In 1943, Mane began working as an editor with director Raja Nene. Together, they worked on films such as Taramati (1945), Phir Bhi Apna Hai (1946), and Bachchon Ka Khel (1946). During this period, he also served as the director for the music-focused film Lalat.

In 1946, Jobanputra, the owner of Pune's Deccan Studio, commissioned Nene to make a biographical film based on the life of folk poet Patthe Bapurao. Mane contributed to the screenplay and directed the project, Patthe Bapurao, though he was officially credited as the co-director. This project marked his formal entry into screenwriting. He followed this with Ketakicha Banaat, which featured actor Suryakant in his first leading role.

=== Alhad Chitra, Chetan Chitra, and Commercial Success (1950–1959) ===
In 1950, with financial backing from Prabhakarpant Korgaonker of Kolhapur, Mane co-founded the production company Alhad Chitra alongside Dada Dharmadhikari and others. The banner's debut film, Bala Jo Jo Re, featured a story by V. V. Bokil, a screenplay and lyrics by G. D. Madgulkar, and performances by Suryakant, Usha Kiran and Sulochana. The film achieved commercial success, completing a silver jubilee run. Alhad Chitra produced consecutive silver jubilee hits with Stree Janma Hi Tujhi Kahani and Chimani Pakhare (released in Hindi as Nanhe Munne), placing the company at its commercial peak by 1952 before it closed operations in 1953.

Mane subsequently established his own production banner, Chetan Chitra. The company's first venture, the socially conscious drama Paydali Padleli Phule (1956), was a commercial failure. He followed it with a series of films, including Zakli Mooth (1956), Sata Janmacha Sobati (1957), Don Ghadicha Daav (1957), and Paishacha Paus (1958). In 1957, his film Dhakti Jaoo received the National Film Award for Best Marathi Feature Film.

In 1959, Mane directed Sangtye Aika, which became a major milestone in his career. Written by G. G. Parkhi with dialogues by Vyankatesh Madgulkar, and an ensemble cast including Jayshree Gadkar, Sulochana, Chandrakant, Suryakant, Dada Salvi and Hansa Wadkar, the film completed a historic 131-week run in a single theatre.

=== Later Directorial Career and Industry Contributions ===
Following Avaghachi Sansar (1960), Mane received Maharashtra State Film Award for Best Director and National Film Award for Best Marathi Feature Film awards for his directorial work on Shahir Parshuram (1961) and Manini (1962). Over his career, he directed approximately 58 films, including Rangpanchami (1962), Maza Hoshil Ka? (1964), Sawaal Majha Aika! (1965), Kela Ishara Jata Jata (1965), Ek Gaon Bara Bhangadi (1968), Pahuni (1974), Lakshmi (1976), Kalavantin (1977), Sushila (1978), Haldi Kunku (1979), Kulswamini Ambabai (1984), and Gaon Tasa Changla Pan Veshila Tangla (1986). He also wrote the stories and screenplays for 14 of his films, including Aboli, Don Ghadicha Dav, Ek Gaon Bara Bhangadi, Naar Nirmite Nara, and Kela Ishara Jata Jata.

Throughout his career, Mane collaborated with prominent literary figures, including G. D. Madgulkar, P. B. Bhave, Y. G. Joshi, Pandit Mahadevshastri Joshi, Ranjit Desai, Vyankatesh Madgulkar, and Shankar Patil. Despite his established success as an independent director, he returned to assist his mentor, V. Shantaram, as an assistant director on the landmark film Pinjara (1972).

Outside of active filmmaking, Mane served as an advisor to the Akhil Bharatiya Marathi Chitrapat Mahamandala and was actively involved in the advocacy and development efforts to establish the Chitranagari studio complex in Kolhapur.

== Filmography ==
Year	Film	Director	Writer	Notes
1949	Jai Bhim	Yes		Debut as a director
1950	Ketakichya Banaat	Yes		
1953	Aboli	Yes		
1954	Suhagan	Yes		Hindi film
1954	Shubh Mangal	Yes		
1954	Owalni	Yes		
1954	Kalakar	Yes		
1955	Punvechi Raat	Yes		
1956	Paidali Padleli Phule	Yes		
1957	Preet Sangam	Yes		
1957	Zakli Mooth	Yes		
1958	Dhakti Jaoo	Yes		National Film Award for Best Marathi Feature Film
1958	Don Ghadicha Daav	Yes		
1959	Sangtye Aika	Yes		
1959	Saata Janmachi Sobati	Yes		
1960	Paishacha Paaus	Yes		
1960	Avaghachi Sansar	Yes		
1961	Shahir Parshuram	Yes		Maharashtra State Film Award for Best Director
1961	Rang Panchami	Yes		
1961	Manini	Yes		National Film Award for Best Marathi Feature Film
1962	Preeti Vivah	Yes		
1962	Chimnyachi Shala	Yes		
1962	Bhagya Laxmi	Yes		
1963	Naar Nirmite Nara	Yes		
1963	Majha Hoshil Ka?	Yes		
1964	Sawaal Majha Aika!	Yes		National Film Award for Best Marathi Feature Film
1964	Kai Ho Chamatkar	Yes		
1966	Kela Ishara Ishara Jata	Yes		Maharashtra State Film Award for Best Director
1967	Saangu Kashi Me	Yes		
1968	Ek Gaon Bara Bhangadi	Yes		
1969	Gan Gavlan	Yes	Yes	
1969	Dongarchi Maina	Yes		
1971	Ashich Ek Ratra Hoti	Yes		
1971	Aai Udhe Ga Ambabai	Yes		
1973	Mee Tujha Pati Nahi	Yes		
1975	Paach Rangachi Paach Pakhare	Yes		
1976	Pahuni	Yes		Maharashtra State Film Award for Best Director
1976	Farari	Yes		
1977	Asla Navra Nako Ga Bai!	Yes		
1978	Kalavantin	Yes	Yes	
1978	Sushila	Yes		
1978	Laxmi	Yes		
1979	Haldi Kunku	Yes		
1979	Duniya Kari Salam	Yes		
1980	Saawaz	Yes		
1981	Totaya Aamdar	Yes		
1981	Pori Zara Zapun	Yes		
1981	Aai	Yes		
1982	Galli Te Dilli	Yes		
1982	Don Baika Phajeeti Aika	Yes	Yes	
1983	Sansar Pakhrancha	Yes		
1984	Kulswamini Ambabai	Yes		
1984	Jagavegli Prem Kahani	Yes		
1985	Gaon Tasa Changla Pan Veshila Tangla	Yes	Yes	
1991	Bandhan	Yes		
1991	Z.P	Yes		
1993	Lavanyavati	Yes		
