= National Film Award for Best Marathi Feature Film =

Indian film award

- National award for contributions to Indian Cinema
- Awarded for: Best Marathi Feature Film(s) of the year
- Sponsored by: National Film Development Corporation of India
- Formerly called: President's Silver Medal for Best Feature Film in Marathi (1954–1968); National Film Award for Best Feature Film in Marathi (1969–2021)
- Rewards: Rajat Kamal (Silver Lotus); ₹2,00,000
- First award: 1954
- Most recent winner: Mu. Po. Bombilwaadi (2024)

The National Film Award for Best Marathi Feature Film is one of the National Film Awards presented annually by the National Film Development Corporation of India. It is one of several awards presented for feature films and awarded with Rajat Kamal (Silver Lotus).

The National Film Awards, established in 1954, are the most prominent film awards in India that merit the best of the Indian cinema. The ceremony also presents awards for films in various regional languages.

Awards for films in seven regional language (Bengali, Hindi, Kannada, Malayalam, Marathi, Tamil and Telugu) started from 2nd National Film Awards which were presented on 21 December 1955. Three awards of "President's Silver Medal for Best Feature Film", "Certificate of Merit for the Second Best Feature Film" and "Certificate of Merit for the Third Best Feature Film" were instituted. The later two certificate awards were discontinued from 15th National Film Awards (1967). Since the 70th National Film Awards, the name was changed to "Best Marathi Feature Film".

Directed by P. K. Atre, the 1954 film Mahatma Phule, based on life of a Maharashtrian social reformer Jyotiba Govindrao Phule, was honoured with the first president's silver medal for Best Feature Film in Marathi.

== Winners ==
Award includes 'Rajat Kamal' (Silver Lotus Award) and cash prize. Following are the award winners over the years:

Awards legends
*	President's Silver Medal for Best Feature Film
*	Certificate of Merit for the Second Best Feature Film
*	Certificate of Merit for the Third Best Feature Film
*	Certificate of Merit for the Best Feature Film
*	Indicates a joint award for that year

List of award films, showing the year (award ceremony), producer(s) and director(s)
Year	Film(s)	Producer(s)	Director(s)	Refs.
1954 (2nd)	Mahatma Phule	Atre Pictures	Pralhad Keshav Atre	
1955 (3rd)	Me Tulas Tujhya Angani	Nav Chitra	Raja Thakur	
1955 (3rd)	Shevagyachya Shenga	Sadashiv Row J. Kavi	Shantaram Athavale	
1956 (4th)	No Award			
1957 (5th)	Gruhdevta	Surel Chitra	Madhav Shinde	
1958 (6th)	Dhakti Jau	Sarvashri Wamanrao Kulkarni and Vishnupant Chavan	Anant Mane	
1959 (7th)	No Award			
1960 (8th)	Kanyadaan	Surel Chitra	Madhav Shinde	
1960 (8th)	Umaj Padel Tar	Narayan Baburao Kamat	Dinkar D. Patil	
1961 (9th)	Manini	Kala Chitra	Anant Mane	
1961 (9th)	Vaijayanta	Rekha Films	Gajanan Jagirdar	
1961 (9th)	Manasala Pankh Astat	Madhav Shinde	Madhav Shinde	
1962 (10th)	Rangalya Ratri Asha	The Maharashtra Film Industrial Co-Operative Society Ltd.	Raja Thakur	
1962 (10th)	Jaawai Majha Bhala	Maneesha Chitra Pvt Ltd.	Neelkanth Magdum	
1962 (10th)	Gariba Gharchi Lek	Shivaji Gulabrao Katkar	Kamlakar Vishnu Torne	
1963 (11th)	Ha Majha Marg Ekla	Sudhir Phadke	Raja Paranjape	
1963 (11th)	Te Majhe Ghar	Ravindra Bhat	Ganesh Bhat	
1964 (12th)	Pathlaag	Raja Paranjape	Raja Paranjape	
1964 (12th)	Tuka Jhalasi Kalas	N. G. Datar	Raja Nene	
1964 (12th)	Sawaal Majha Aika!	Anant Mane	Anant Mane	
1965 (13th)	Sadhi Mansa	Lilabai Bhalji Pendharkar	Bhalji Pendharkar	
1965 (13th)	Nirmon (Konkani)	Frank Fernand	A. Salam	
1965 (13th)	Yuge Yuge Me Vaat Pahili	Babasaheb S. Fatehlal	C. Vishwanath	
1966 (14th)	Pawana Kantcha Dhondi	Mahalaxmi Chitra	Anant Thakur	
1967 (15th)	Santh Wahate Krishnamai	Sahakari Chitrapath Sanstha Ltd	M. G. Pathak	
1968 (16th)	Ektee	G. Chaugle	Raja Thakur	
1969 (17th)	Tambdi Mati	Lilabai Bhalji Pendharkar	Bhalji Pendharkar	
1970 (18th)	Mumbaicha Jawai	Tushar Pradhan	Raja Thakur	
1971 (19th)	Shantata! Court Chalu Aahe	Satyadev Govind Productions	Arvind Deshpande	
1972 (20th)	Pinjra	V. Shantaram	V. Shantaram	
1973 (21st)	No Award			
1974 (22nd)	No Award			
1975 (23rd)	Saamna	Ramdas Phutane	Jabbar Patel	
1976 (24th)	No Award			
1977 (25th)	Jait Re Jait	Usha Mangeshkar	Jabbar Patel	
1978 (26th)	No Award			
1979 (27th)	Sinhasan	Jabbar Patel	Jabbar Patel	
1980 (28th)	No Award			
1981 (29th)	Umbartha	Jabbar Patel and D. V. Rao	Jabbar Patel	
1982 (30th)	Shapit	Madhukar Rupji, Sudha A. Chitle and Vinay Newalkar	Arvind Deshpande and Rajdutt	
1983 (31st)	Smruti Chitre	Vinayak Chaskar	Vijaya Mehta	
1984 (32nd)	Mahananda	Mahesh Satoskar	K. G. Koregaonkar	
1985 (33rd)	Pudhche Paool	Madhukar Rupji, Sudha A. Chitle and Vinay Newalkar	Rajdutt	
1986 (34th)	No Award			
1987 (35th)	Sarja	Seema Deo	Rajdutt	
1988 (36th)	No Award			
1989 (37th)	Kalat Nakalat	Smita Talwalkar	Kanchan Nayak	
1990 (38th)	No Award			
1991 (39th)	No Award			
1992 (40th)	Ek Hota Vidushak	NFDC	Jabbar Patel	
1993 (41st)	Lapandav	Sachin Parekar and Sanjay Parekar	Shravani Devdhar	
1994 (42nd)	No Award			
1995 (43rd)	Bangarwadi	NFDC and Doordarshan	Amol Palekar	
1996 (44th)	Rao Saheb	K. B. Joshi and Ravindra Surve	Sanjay Surkar	
1997 (45th)	No Award			
1998 (46th)	Tu Tithe Mee	Smita Talwalkar	Sanjay Surkar	
1999 (47th)	Gharabaher	Ratan Madan and Narendra Shinde	Sanjay Surkar	
2000 (48th)	Astitva	Jhamu Sughand	Mahesh Manjrekar	
2001 (49th)	No Award			
2002 (50th)	Vastupurush	NFDC	Sumitra Bhave and Sunil Sukthankar	
2003 (51st)	Not Only Mrs. Raut	Aditi Deshpande	Gajendra Ahire	
2004 (52nd)	Uttarayan	Bipin Nadkarni and Sanjay Shetty	Bipin Nadkarni	
2005 (53rd)	Dombivali Fast	Ramakant Gaikwad	Nishikant Kamat	
2006 (54th)	Shevri	Neena Kulkarni	Gajendra Ahire	
2007 (55th)	Nirop	Aparna Dharmadhikari	Sachin Kundalkar	
2008 (56th)	Harishchandrachi Factory	UTV Motion Pictures, Smiti Kanodia and Paresh Mokashi	Paresh Mokashi	
2009 (57th)	Natarang	Zee Entertainment Enterprises Ltd.	Ravindra Harischandra Jadhav	
2010 (58th)	Mala Aai Vhhaychy!	Samruddhi Porey	Samruddhi Porey	
2011 (59th)	Shala	Vivek Wagh and Nilesh Navalkar	Sujay Dahake	
2012 (60th)	Investment	Pratibha Matkari	Ratnakar Matkari	
2013 (61st)	Aajcha Divas Majha	White Swan Productions	Chandrakant Kulkarni	
2014 (62nd)	Killa	Jar Pictures and M. R. Film Works	Avinash Arun	
2015 (63rd)	Ringan	My Role Motion Pictures	Makarand Mane	
2016 (64th)	Dashakriya	Rangneel Creations	Sandeep Bhalachandra Patil	
2017 (65th)	Kachcha Limboo	Mandar Devasthali	Prasad Oak	
2018 (66th)	Bhonga	Nalinee Productions	Shivaji Lotan Patil	
2019 (67th)	Bardo	Paanchjanya Productions Pvt. Ltd.	Bhimrao Mude	
2020 (68th)	Goshta Eka Paithanichi	Planet Marathi	Shantanu Ganesh Rode	
2021 (69th)	Ekda Kaay Zala	Showbox Entertainment and Gajavadana Rairah Corporation	Saleel Kulkarni	
2022 (70th)	Vaalvi	Mayasabha Karamanuk Mandali and Zee Studios	Paresh Mokashi	
2023 (71st)	Shyamchi Aai	Amruta Films	Sujay Dahake	
2024 (72nd)	Mu. Po. Bombilwaadi	Vivek Films and Mayasabha Karamanuk Mandali	Paresh Mokashi	
