= Master Vithal =

Indian actor (1906–1969)

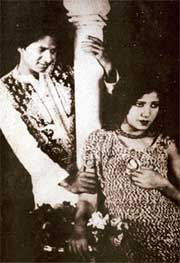
- Master Vithal and Zubeida in Alam Ara (1931)
- Born: 1906
- Died: 1969 (aged 62–63)
- Occupation: actor

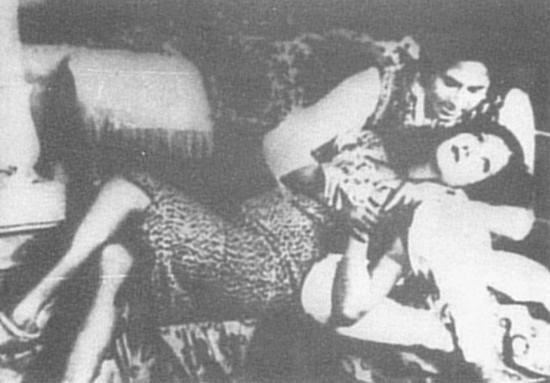
Alam Ara (1931)

Master Vithal or Vithal (1906–1969) was an actor in Indian cinema, best known as the hero of India's first talkie Alam Ara (1931) and of Marathi and Hindi silent stunt films (silent films had cue cards in a particular language), which gave him the epithet as the Douglas Fairbanks of India.

Vithal started his film career in Marathi films in 1924 and worked as a film technician and dancer. He was cast as the male lead in Ratan Manjari (1926) and followed with the swashbuckling roles of many silent stunt films and became a very popular actor. Though he was the male lead of Alam Ara, he hardly had any dialogue due to poor Hindi diction. He returned to silent films and then to talkie Marathi films from 1932 till his last film in 1966. He also directed two films and gave music score to one film. He acted in more than 90 films during his career of 42 years from 1924 to 1966.

== Pre 1930 career ==
Master Vithal's début was on the stage as a child artist with Raja Pur Ka Natak Mandali. He then started his career as a film editor with the film company in Maharashtra Films, Kolhapur which was owned by Baburao Painter. His first film role was as a female dancer in Kalyan Khajina, the silent era film directed by Painter. He continued to work as film editor and a dancer and played minor roles in films. His first break as a male lead was in the film Ratan Manjari (1926) produced by Sharda Studios whom he had joined earlier in 1925. After that, he was a permanent fixture in the role of a hero and he was the star attraction of the Sharda Studios, owned by Nanubhai Desai, Anand Prasad Kapoor and Harshadrai Mehta. Nanubhai Desai was the studio founder and director of many stunt films produced by the company in which Vithal appeared in swashbuckling roles with Zebunissa as his heroine. A professional wrestler, he became a very popular fearless hero acting in films in historical themes related to Rajasthan and Maharashtra; thus giving him the title "the Indian Douglas Fairbanks", a title Vithal hated. Audience adored him in his stunt hero role, which became his "forte". By 1930, he was the highest paid male star in Indian cinema industry.

== Post 1930 career ==
In 1930, Vithal's popularity in Marathi films attracted Ardeshir Irani of Imperial Film Company to invite him to join his company to make India's first talkie, though Mehboob Khan was also vying for the role. Vithal, who was quite excited by Irani's offer, accepted and moved to Irani's newly formed film company Sagar Studios in Bombay, breaking his contract with Sharda Studios. Sharda Studios sued him and he was defended by the lawyer Muhammad Ali Jinnah, who would later become the founder of Pakistan. Vithal won the case. The following year, Vithal played the hero in the first Indian talkie Alam Ara with Zubeida as the female lead. Alam Ara was also the first film in which music was introduced, as many as ten music scores were part of the film. As his Hindi diction was poor, he could not deliver the dialogues properly; his acting quality in histrionic roles was also questioned. He was thus shown mostly in a state of trans or semi consciousness in the film and hardly had any dialogue. It is said that Vithal could not adopt himself to the new genre of talking-singing films in Hindi as he was "reduced to a hero who is (was) magically stuck dumb in Alam Ara." His talkie debut ended without any demand for his acting roles in Hindi films. In 1932, he switched back to silent films, which were no more in flavour. The talkies led to his decline in Hindi films; Vithal would never get a major role in Hindi films again. From 1934 onward, he switched back to Marathi films realizing his limitations. From the 1940s onward, he regularly appeared in films by Bhalji Pendharkar and those featuring Lalita Pawar and Durga Khote. He also played in a side role in the 1944 blockbuster film Ramshastri. Towards the end, he played only minor roles in Marathi films; his last film appearance was in 1966.

In 1933, Master Vithal introduced the concept of double role in Hindi talkie cinema by his directorial début Raja (in Marathi) and Awara Shahzada (Hindi), in which the role of a prince and a pauper was played by Shahu Modak, whereas Vithal played his first double role in the silent film Raj Tarang (1928).

== Films ==
Master Vithal acted in more than 90 films, directed two films (Swarajyacha Shiledar and Awara Shahzada), and composed music for only one film, (Kashmir Ki Kali). The list of his movies, in the descending order of their release, has the following names.

- Sheras Savva Sher (1966)
- Shodha Mhanje Sapdel (1966)
- Sadhi Manse (1965)
- Vavtal (1965)
- Mohityanchi Manjula (1963)
- Vanakesari (1960)
- Akashganga (1959)
- Matevin Bal (1958)
- Naikinicha Sazza (1957)
- Pavankhind (1956)
- Tai Teleen (1953)
- Vaadal (1953)
- Chhatrapati Shivaji (1952)
- Mard Maratha (1952)
- Mayecha Pazhar (1952)
- Narveer Tanaji (1952)
- Swarajyacha Shiledar (1951)
- Shilanganache Sone (1950)
- Vikram Shashikala (1949)
- Garibanche Rajya (1948)
- Jai Bhawani (1947)
- Jadugar (1946)
- Kashmir Ki Kali (1946)
- Rukmini Swayamvar (1946)
- Sasurvaas (1946)
- Nagma-e-Sahra (1945)
- Pannadai (1945)
- Ramshastri (1944)
- Bahirji Naik (1943)
- Soonbai (1942)
- Amrit (1941) as Vilas
- Jagat Mohini (1940)
- Mohini (1940)
- Netaji Palkar (1939)
- Asiai Sitara (1937)
- Hind Mahila (1936)
- Raj Tarang (1935)
- Rangila Nawab (1935)
- Bhedi Rajkumar (1934)
- Chhatrapati Sambhaji (1934)
- Burkhewala (1932)
- Kalo Bhoot (1932)
- Zalim Jawani (1932) as Pratap
- Alam Ara as Adil
- Anangsena (1931)
- Daulat Ka Nasha (1931)
- Dilawar (1931)
- Gulam (1931)
- Hoor-E-Misar (1931)
- Meri Jaan (1931)
- Arunodaya (1930)
- Dav Pech (1930)
- Josh-E-Jawani (1930)
- Veer Na Ver (1930)
- Bhedi Sawar (1929)
- Chirage Kohistan (1929)
- Mirza Sahiban (1929)
- Nishan Danka (1929)
- Ranghelo Rajput (1929)
- Rank Nu Ratan (1929)
- Gul Badan (1928)
- Heer Sundari (1928)
- Kanak Kanta (1928)
- Karuna Kumari (1928)
- Raj Tarang (1928)
- Sassi Punnu (1928)
- Saundarya Sura(1928)
- Sohni Mahiwal (1927/II)
- Asuri Lalsa (1927)
- Balidan (1927)
- Bansari Bala (1927)
- Bhedi Trishul (1927)
- Jaan-e-alam Anjuman Ara (1927)
- Kala Pahad
- Mahasati Ansuya
- Shiraz-Ud-Dowla (1927)
- Swadesh Seva (1927)
- Vande Mataram Ashram (1927)
- Veer Garjana (1927)
- Gunial Gulab (1926)
- Madan Kala (1926)
- Ratan Manjari (1926)
- Suvarna Kamal (1926)
- Vasant Bala (1926)
- Bajirao Mastani (1925)
- Kalyan Khajina (1924) as a dancing girl
