= Raja Paranjape =

Indian film actor and director

- Born: Rajabhau Dattatraya Paranjpe; 24 April 1910; Miraj, Bombay Presidency, British Raj (now Maharashtra, India)
- Died: 9 February 1979 (aged 68); Pune, Maharashtra, India
- Occupations: Actor; Director; Producer; Writer
- Years active: 1936–1979
- Spouse: Tara Paranjape (m. 1935)

Rajabhau Dattatraya Paranjpe (24 April 1910 – 9 February 1979), known as Raja Paranjape, was an Indian actor, director, producer and writer in the Marathi film and Hindi film industries. He started to produce Marathi films under the banner named Gajraj with G.D.Madgulkar and Sudhir Phadke. The super-hit Hindi film, Mera Saaya, was a remake of his Marathi film, Pathlaag.

== Early life ==
Paranjape was born on 24 April 1910 in Miraj, Bombay State. He entered the film industry as an organ player in the music department. Interested in music from an early age, he inherited his musical inclinations from his mother. During his student years, Bapurao Ketkar of the Bharat Gayan Samaj helped him develop his interest in music. Paranjape also developed a keen interest in watching plays and films. His understanding of acting earned him an unexpected opportunity to perform in the play Lapandav, in which he demonstrated his acting abilities.

== Career ==
In a career spanning 40 years, Paranjape was associated with about 80 Marathi and Hindi films.

=== Films as director (29 titles) ===
1. (1948) Balidaan
2. (1948) Do Kaliyan
3. (1948) Jeevacha Sakha
4. (1950) Jara Japun
5. (1950) Pudhcha Paool
6. (1951) Parijatak
7. (1951) Shrikrishna Satyabhama
8. (1952) Lakhachi Gosht
9. (1952) Pedgaoche Shahane
10. (1953) Chacha Chowdhury
11. (1954) Oon Paoos
12. (1955) Ganget Ghode Nhahale
13. (1956) Andhala Magto Ek Dola
14. (1956) Devghar
15. (1956) Gaath Padli Thaka Thaka
16. (1956) Pasant Aahe Mulgi
17. (1959) Baap Bete
18. (1960) Jagachya Pathivar
19. (1961) Aadhi Kalas Mag Paaya
20. (1961) Suvashini
21. (1962) Soniyachi Paoolen
22. (1963) Baiko Maheri Jaate
23. (1963) Haa Mazha Marg Eklaa
24. (1964) Pathlaag
25. (1965) Padchhaya
26. (1966) Gurukilli
27. (1966) Love and Murder
28. (1967) Kaka Mala Vachwa
29. (1969) Aadhar

=== Films as actor (21 titles) ===
1. (1937) Kanhopatra
2. (1937) Pratibha Manduk
3. (1939) Life's for Living: AadmiMama (as Paranjpe)
4. (1939) Manoos
5. (1942) Soonbai
6. (1944) Panna
7. (1946) Sasurvaas
8. (1952) Lakhachi Gosht
9. (1952) Pedgaoche Shahane Kaka Shahane
10. (1952) Raag Rang
11. (1953) Chacha Chowdhury
12. (1954) Een Meen Sadeteen
13. (1954) Oon Paoos - (Bapu Master)
14. (1960) Jagachya Pathivar
15. (1960) Hach Sunbaicha Bhau
16. (1963) Baiko Maheri Jaate
17. (1963) Bandini - (Kalyani's Father)
18. (1963) Ha Majha Marg Ekla
19. (1969) Aadhar
20. (1971) Jal Bin Machhli Nritya Bin Bijli - (Chamay 'Royal' Roy)
21. (1972) Piya Ka Ghar - (Gauri Shankar)
22. (1973) Varhadi aani Vajantri - (Retired Mamledar - Groom's father)
23. (1974) Us-Paar - (Mohan's Paternal Grandfather)
