= List of Marathi films of 1984 =

A list of films produced by the Marathi language film industry based in Maharashtra in the year 1984.

== 1984 Releases ==
A list of Marathi films released in 1984.

Year	Film	Director	Cast	Release Date	Producer	Notes	Source
1984	Jagavegali Prem Kahani	Anant Mane					
1984	Savvasher	Sachin Pilgaonkar					
1984	Lek Chalali Sasarla	N. S. Vaidya	Laxmikant Berde, Mahesh Kothare, Alka Kubal, Shashikala				
1984	Bahuroopi	Satish Ranadive					
1984	Chawhata	Arun Vasudev Karnatki					
1984	Aali Laher Kela Kahar	Arun Vasudev Karnatki					
1984	Gosht Dhamal Namyachi	Girish Ghanekar	Kuldeep Pawar, Ashok Saraf, Jayashree Talpade, Sudhir Dalvi, Prakash Inamdar				
1984	Gharcha Bhedi	Kantilal Dave	Lalita Pawar, Mahesh Kothare, Nivedita Joshi, Kishore Jadhav				
1984	Kulswamini Ambabai	Anant Mane	Lalita Pawar				
1984	Thakas Mahathak	Raja Bargir					
1984	Hech Mazha Maher	Rajdutt	Ramesh Deo, Sulabha Deshpande, Ashok Saraf				
1984	Mumbaicha Faujdar	Rajdutt	Ravindra Mahajani, Ranjana				
1984	Sage Soyare	Murlidhar Kapdi					
1984	Bin Kamacha Navra	Murlidhar Kapdi	Ranjana, Ashok Saraf, Nilu Phule				
1984	Navri Mile Navryala	Sachin Pilgaonkar	Sachin Pilgaonkar, Supriya Pilgaonkar, Ashok Saraf, Nivedita Joshi, Jairam Kulkarni, Shrikant Moghe, Daya Dongre	1 January 1984	Shree Tulsi Productions		
