= List of Marathi films of 1976 =

A list of Indian films produced by the Marathi-language film industry based in Maharashtra in the year 1976.

== 1976 releases ==
Year	Film	Director	Cast	Release Date	Producer	Notes	Source
1976	Aaram Haram Aahe	Kamalakar Vishnu Torne	Ravindra Mahajani, Ruhi Berde, Ram Vardhe, Suresh Bhagwat, Padma Chavan	26 October 1976	Prem Chitra		
1976	Ha Khel Sawalyancha	Vasant Joglekar	Kashinath Ghanekar, Asha Kale, Lalan Sarang, Raja Gosavi, Dhumal, Shrikant Moghe, Deven Verma, Jairam Kulkarni	21 May 1976	Madhu Movies		
1976	Pahuni	Anant Mane					
1976	Jawal Ye Laju Nako	Arun Vasudev Karnatki	Ashok Saraf				
1976	Choricha Mamla	Babasaheb S. Fattelal	Lalita Pawar				
1976	Farari	Anant Mane					
1976	Ghashiram Kotwal	K. Hariharan, Mani Kaul	Mohan Agashe, Rajani Chavan, Vandana Pandit		Yukt Film Co-Op	This is an adaptation of Vijay Tendulkar's famous Marathi play Ghashiram Kotwal	
1976	Tumcha Aamcha Jamala	Dada Kondke	Dada Kondke				

== See also ==
- Marathi cinema
