= List of Marathi films of 1982 =

This is a list of films produced by the Marathi-language film industry in Maharashtra in the year 1982.

== 1982 Releases ==
A list of Marathi films released in 1982.

Year	Film	Director	Cast	Release Date	Producer	Notes	Source
1982	Bhujang	Murlidhar Kapdi	Mohan Kothivan, Usha Naik, Nilu Phule				
1982	Shapit	Rajdutt, Arvind Deshpande	Madhu Kambikar, Yashwant Dutt, Nilu Phule, Ashok Saraf			National Film Award for Best Feature Film in Marathi in 1982	
1982	Laxmichi Paule	G.G. Bhosle	Suhasini Deshpande, Balchandra Kulkarni, Ravindra Mahajani	18 February 1982 (India)	Everest Entertainment		
1982	Mai Baap	Sachin					
1982	Chatak Chandni	Prakash Bhende	Prakash Bhende, Bal Karve, Lalita Pawar	November 1982 (India)	Everest Entertainment		
1982	Aali Aangavar	Dada Kondke	Dada Kondke, Ratnamala, Usha Chavan, Ganpat Patil, Dinanath Takalkar		Dada Kondke		
1982	Don Baika Phajeeti Aika	Anant Mane	P. Anand, Sambha Arye, Balchandra		Glamour Films		
1982	Zadpat Karu De Khatpat	Shreeram Gojamgunde					
1982	Aavhan	Sushil Kamat	Jayshree Gadkar, Sanjay Jog, Shrikant Moghe	2 February 1982 (India)			
1982	Aplech Daat Aplech Oth	Rajdutt					
1982	Vishwas	Datta Keshav					
1982	Galli Te Dilli	Anant Mane					
1982	Bhamta	Dinkar D. Patil					
1982	Atyachar	Bhaskar Chandavarkar	Sushma Deshpande, Vibha Jakatdar, Satish Pulekar				
1982	Kay Ga Sakhu	Shankarrao Chavan	Arun Sarnaik, Padma Chavan, Raj Shekhar, Madhu Apte				
1982	Lakhat Ashi Dekhani	Dinkar D. Patil	Jayshree Gadkar, Leela Gandhi, Nargis Banu, Nilu Phule		Shree Bharat Chitra, Mumbai		
1982	Thorli Jau	Kamalakar Torne	Mohan Gokhale, Kavita Kiran, Ravindra Mahajani, Mahesh Kothare, Asha Kale		Kamalakar Torne		
1982	Bhannat Bhanu	Dutta Keshav Kulkarni	Ashok Saraf, Sulochana, Nilu Phule, Sushma Shiromani, Shrikant Moghe		Nandlal Lokhande		
1982	Umbartha	Jabbar Patel	Smita Patil, Girish Karnad, Shrikant Moghe		Satya Chitra International, Sujatha Chitra	National Film Award for Best Feature Film in Marathi in 1981.Dubbed in Hindi as Subah.	
