= List of Marathi films of 1975 =

A list of films produced by the Marathi language film industry based in Maharashtra in the year 1975.

== 1975 Releases ==
A list of Marathi films released in 1975.

Year	Film	Director	Cast	Release Date	Producer	Notes	Source
1975	Samna	Dr. Jabbar Patel	Mohan Agashe, Dr. Shriram Lagoo, Smita Patil and Nilu Phule	July 1975 (West Germany)	Amol Chitre Prakashan, Giriraj Pictures	Nominated for the Golden Berlin Bear. National Film Award for Best Feature Film in Marathi in 1975.	
1975	Bhakta Pundalik	Datta Dharmadhikari	Heera Chavan, Lata Karnataki, Saroj Sukhtankar	19 February 1975 (India)	Everest Entertainment		
1975	Pandoba Porgi Phasli	Prabhakar Naik					
1975	Owalte Bhauraya	Dutta Keshav Kulkarni	Ramesh Deo, Seema Deo, Ravi Raaj				
1975	Chandanachi Choli Anga Anga Jali	V. Shantaram	Sandhya, Arun Sarnaik			Dubbed in Hindi with same name	
1975	Karava Tasa Bharava	Raja Bargir					
1975	Ya Sukhano Ya	Rajdutt					
1975	Varaat	Prabhakar Naik	Mohan Choti, Nilu Phule, Ashok Saraf				
1975	Zunz	Kiran Shantaram	Ranjana, Ravindra Mahajani				
1975	Paach Rangachi Paach Pakhre	Anant Mane					
1975	Pandu Havaldar	Dada Kondke	Dada Kondke, Ashok Saraf, Usha Chavan			Pandu Hawaldar gave Marathi film industry a new star Ashok Saraf, who was appreciated by the audiences than Dada Kondke.	
1975	Jyotibacha Navas	Kamalakar Torne	Padma Chavan, Vikram Gokhale, Rajshekar	15 April 1975 (India)	Everest Entertainment		
