= List of Marathi films of 1983 =

A list of films produced by the Marathi language film industry based in Maharashtra in the year 1983.

== 1983 Releases ==
A list of Marathi films released in 1983.

Year	Film	Director	Cast	Release Date	Producer	Notes	Source
1983	Mardani	Govind Kulkarni	Master Makrand Bapat, Kamini Bhatia, Chhagan Bhujbal		Bhavna Productions		
1983	Gupchup Gupchup	V.K. Naik	Ashok Saraf, Ranjana, Padma Chavan, Mahesh Kothare, Shreeram Lagoo				
1983	Sasu Varchad Javai	Rajdutt					
1983	Raghumaina	Rajdutt	Madhu Kambikar, Nana Patekar, Nilu Phule				
1983	Savitri	Murlidhar Kapdi	Nana Patekar, Kuldeep Pawar, Ranjana				
1983	Kashyala Udyachi Baat	Datta Keshav					
1983	Baiko Asavi Ashi	Murlidhar Kapdi	Ramesh Deo, Ravi Patwardhan, Nilu Phule				
1983	Sansar Pakharancha	Anant Mane					
1983	Paaygoon	Arun Vasudev Karnatki	Kuldeep Pawar, Nilu Phule				
1983	Baisaheb	Datta Mane, Dattaram Tawde					
1983	Ranine Daav Jinkla	Datta Keshav					
1983	Smriti Chitre	Vijaya Mehta	Sudhir Joshi, Suhas Joshi, Ravindra Mankani		Vinayak Chaskar	National Film Award for Best Feature Film in Marathi in 1983	
