= Usha Naik =

Indian actress

- Born: Usha Naik; 2 May 1956 (age 70); Belgaum, Karnataka, India
- Occupation: Actress
- Years active: 1974–present
- Spouse: Krishnarao Mohire (m. 1988)
- Children: 1

Usha Naik is an Indian actress who works in Marathi films. She started her career as a background dancer in films. She established herself as the leading lady of Marathi Cinema In the late 70s and 80s. She received numerous accolades including Filmfare Award for Best Actress – Marathi and prestigious Maharashtra State Film Awards.

== Early life & career ==
The movie Samna, directed by Jabbar Patel, marked Usha Naik's debut in the film. She started learning classical dance when she was young, which helped her become known as an actress who could do both serious and funny roles. She began with small parts in films like Jyotibacha Navas and Karava Tas Bharava, and later got a big role in Anant Mane's Pach Rangachi Pach Pakharan. After that, she acted in many Marathi films, playing various characters. She got praised for her roles in movies like Haldi Kunku and Devashappath Khare Sangen. She was even honored by the Maharashtra Government for her work in Kalavantin and won a Filmfare Award for her performance in Devashappath Khare Sangen.

== Filmography ==
=== Films ===
Year	Title	Role	Notes
1972	Pinjara	Troupe dancer	
1973	Anolkhi		
1974	Samna	Suhini	Lead debut
1975	Karava Tas Bharava	Gulab	
1976	Farrari	Soni	
1977	Banya Bapu	Kanta	
1978	Kalavantin	Kalavati	Maharashtra State Film Award (Special Jury Award)
1978	Sushila	Shailaja Deshmukh	
1978	Bhairu Pehelwan Ki Jai	Mauna	
1978	Irsha	Nirmala	
1979	Janki	Uma	
1979	Duniya Kari Salaam	Maina	
1979	Haldi Kunku	Ratnawali	
1979	Baeelveda	Ashok's wife	
1980	Zidd	Ratan	
1980	Sansar	Leela Manohar (Bauli)	
1981	Aai	Chandan	
1981	Pori Jara Japun	Gokula / Sugandha	
1981	Totaya Aamdaar	Raina	
1981	Gondhalat Gondhal	Lavani dancer	Cameo appearance
1981	Govinda Aala Re Aala	Sundara	
1982	Bhujang	Sukhi	
1982	Don Bayka Fajeeti Aika	Sundarabai	
1982	Galli Te Dilli	Gulabbai	
1982	Navare Sagle Gadhav	Madhu	
1982	Raakhandar	Radha	
1982	Bhannat Bhanu		
1982	Diste Tas Naste	Aarti / Champabai	
1983	Paygoon	Uma Patil	
1984	Jagavegli Prem Kahani	Priya / Rita	
1984	Kulswamini Ambabai	Tamasha dancer	Cameo appearance
1985	Devashappath Khare Sangen	Mira Patil	Filmfare Award for Best Actress – Marathi
1985	Gaon Tasa Changla Pan Veshila Tangla	Ratna Patil	
1985	Dekha Pyar Tumhara	Seema Kapoor	Hindi film
1985	Mulgi Zali Ho	Malini Sasane (Malu)	
1986	Maaficha Sakshidar	Geeta	
1988	De Dhadaka Be Dhadak	Chameli / Sugandha	
1990	Rickshawali	Dancer	Cameo appearance in the song "Cricketcha Khel Suru Zala"
1991	Vedh	Ulka	
1991	Andhala Sakshidar	Karuna	
1991	Kaal Ratri 12 Vajta	Bijli	
1992	Ek Hota Vidushak	Dancer	Cameo appearance
1992	Amrutvel	Vasudha	
1996	Durga Aali Ghara	Menka	
1996	Maya Mamta	Rajakka	
1998	Navsacha Por	Devki	
1998	Satvapariksha	Gajrabai	
1999	Maherchi Pahuni	Ranjana	
1999	Sawai Hawaldar	Aarti Maushi	
1999	Bayko Aali Badloon	Sushila	
1999	Ghe Bharari	Doctor	
1999	Nirmala Macchindra Kamble	Bheema	
2000	Navra Majhya Muthit Ga	Mad women	
2000	Barkha Satarkar	Paro Akka	
2000	Sang Priye Tu Kunachi	Lajwanti	
2000	Aai Shakti Deva	Bhagwati's Vahini	
2001	Akleche Kande	Ganga	
2001	Ashi Gyaneshwari	Laxmi Patil	
2002	Owalini	Jeeva's wife	
2004	Hirva Kunku	Akka	
2005	He Apla Asach Chalaycha	Hema Mohite	
2005	Aaiche Kalij	Laxmi	
2006	Natle Mi Tumchyasathi	Hausa Haldipurkar	
2006	Maa Shakhambaricha Mahima	Ushabai	
2008	Mulgi Lagnachi	Sulochana Dhodke	
2008	Bhavachi Laxmi	Godakka	
2008	Bhagam Bhag	Sheetal's aunt	
2009	Halad Tuzi Kunku Maze	Aai	
2009	Nasheebachi Aishi Taishi	Rane Kaku	
2009	Aamdar Majhya Khishat	Aaisaheb	
2009	Rasikachya Lagnat	Rasika's mother-in-law	
2009	Gaon Ek Numbri	Sundarabai Satarkar	
2010	Khurchi Samrat	Paro	
2010	Sasarcha Panga Sauticha Inga	Kamlabai Deshmukh	
2011	Durga Mhantyat Mala	Aai	
2012	Daiv Dete	Janaki Deshmukh	
2014	Ek Hazarachi Note	Budhi	Filmfare Critics Award for Best Actress – Marathi
2015	Carry On Maratha	Martand's mother	
2015	Runh	Aaji	
2016	Aa Jao Please	Kamini Bhopi	Hindi film
2016	Half Ticket	Aaji	
2017	Afternoon Clouds	Kaki	Short film
2017	Lapachhapi	Tulasabai	
2017	Daddy	Arun's mother	Hindi film
2017	Zindagi Virat	Akka	
2017	Idak: The Goat	Aai	
2017	Ek Maratha Lakh Maratha	Laxmi Shinde	
2018	Mahasatta 2035	Aaji	
2018	Mauli	Shantai	
2022	Bhirkit	Jabbar's wife	
2022	Three of Us	Old woman	Hindi film
2022	Baalbhaarti	Rahul's mother	
2025	Asha	Rakhma	
2026	Ladki Bahin	Mangla	

=== Television ===
Year	Title	Role	Notes
2010–2012	Swapnanchya Palikadle	Anuradha Patkar	
2017–2018	Jaago Mohan Pyare	Leelavati	
2021	Phulala Sugandha Maticha	Kakisaheb	
2021–2022	Nima Denzongpa	Sunita Mane	
2023	Jivachi Hotiya Kahili	Bhadrakka	
2023	Tuzech Mi Geet Gaat Aahe	Sagunabai Satarkar	
2023–2024	Rani Me Honar	Aaji	

== Accolades ==
Year	Award	Category	Film	Result	Ref.
1979	Maharashtra State Film Awards	Best Actress	Kalavantin	Nominated	
1979	Maharashtra State Film Awards	Special Jury Award	Kalavantin	Won	
1980	Maharashtra State Film Awards	Maharashtra State Film Award for Best Supporting Actress	Haldi Kunku	Won	
1985	Filmfare Awards Marathi	Best Actress	Devashappath Khare Sangen	Won	
1985	Maharashtra State Film Awards	Best Actress	Devashappath Khare Sangen	Nominated	
2014	Maharashtra State Film Awards	Best Actress	Ek Hazarachi Note	Nominated	
2014	Maharashtra State Film Awards	Special Jury Award	Ek Hazarachi Note	Won	
2015	1st Filmfare Awards Marathi	Best Actress	Ek Hazarachi Note	Nominated	
2015	1st Filmfare Awards Marathi	Best Critic's Actress	Ek Hazarachi Note	Won	
2015	Pune International Film Festival	Best Actress	Ek Hazarachi Note	Won	
2024	Maharashtra State Film Awards	V. Shantaram Lifetime Achievement Award	—N/a	Honoured	
2025	Maharashtra State Film Awards	Best Supporting Actress	Asha	Won	

== See also ==
- Marathi cinema
