= Aamhi =

Aamhi may refer to:

- Aamhi Doghi
- Aamhi Satpute
- Aamhi Asu Ladke
- Aamhi Saare Khavayye
- Aamhi Dogha Raja Rani
- Aamhi Jato Amuchya Gava
- Aamhi Doghe Raja Rani
