= Teen Cheharey =

- Directed by: Y. N. Kapoor
- Produced by: Deepak Kapoor; S. A. Patel
- Starring: Anjana Mumtaz; Sujit Kumar; Jayshree T. Meena T. Raviraaj; Ravindra Mahajani
- Music by: Shyam Ghanshyam
- Production company: Viral Movies
- Distributed by: Vijay Shah
- Release date: 1979
- Country: India
- Language: Hindi

Teen Cheharey (Hindi for Three Faces) is a 1979 Indian Hindi-language romantic thriller film directed by Y. N. Kapoor and produced by Deepak Kapoor and S. A. Patel for Viral Movies. Starring Anjana Mumtaz as a woman betrayed in love who seeks wealth and vengeance by killing her three betrayers, the film also features Sujit Kumar as the investigating officer who becomes romantically involved with her. Supporting cast includes Jayshree T., Meena T., Raviraaj, Ravindra Mahajani, Nana Palsikar and Pran in a special appearance. The film weaves together elements of emotional family drama with those of a suspenseful thriller with music composed by Shyam Ghanshyam.

Teen Cheharey marked the second time director Y. N. Kapoor worked with male lead Sujit Kumar who was widely regarded as the first superstar of Bhojpuri films. Scholarly work on Hindi and Bhojpuri cinema, such as Kathryn Hardy's analysis, stresses the “porous boundaries” between the two cinemas arising because of notable overlaps in audience and production infrastructures, countering views of the industries as entirely distinct. This crossover illustrates how a Bhojpuri star like Kumar could drive commercial success in Hindi films.

== Plot ==
Teen Cheharey centers on the lives of three sisters raised in poverty by their father in a modest household. The narrative primarily follows the eldest sister, whose trusting nature leads to repeated exploitation by three different men. Each betrayal leaves her emotionally devastated, ultimately transforming her from an innocent young woman into a hardened and vengeful figure.

Seeking autonomy and escape, she becomes a cabaret dancer and gradually attains wealth and social prominence. With her newfound power, she orchestrates the murders of the three men responsible for her downfall. The killings remain unsolved, prompting the assignment of a police officer to the case. Unaware of her culpability, the officer develops romantic feelings for her. As the investigation progresses, he uncovers her identity as the perpetrator and chooses duty over personal attachment, ensuring her prosecution.

The woman is sentenced to seven years in prison. Despite the outcome, the officer pledges to wait for her, maintaining his emotional commitment throughout her incarceration.

== Cast ==
- Anjana Mumtaz as the elder sister betrayed by three lovers
- Sujit Kumar as the police officer who falls in love with the elder sister
- Jayshree T. as the middle sister
- Meena T. as youngest sister
- Nana Palsikar as the father of the three sisters
- Raviraaj as first betrayer.
- Ravindra Mahajani as the second betrayer
- Pran as third betrayer
- Birbal
- Mohan Choti
- Dilip Dutt
- Leela Patel
- Brahmachari

== Soundtrack ==
The music of Teen Cheharey was composed by Shyam Ghanshyam with lyrics by multiple writers including Mohsin Nawab, Kulwant Jani, Bhardwaj, Sajan Dehlvi, and Upendra.

No.	Title	Singer(s)	Lyricist
1	"Jo Bhi Jisne Maanga"	Chetan, Madhu Chandra	Mohsin Nawab
2	"Yeh Kaise Duniya Wale Hain (Likhi Hai Yeh Vidhata Ne)"	Mohammed Rafi	Kulwant Jani
3	"Baaton Baaton Mein Jo Baat (Woh Is Andaz Se)"	Mohammed Rafi, Shyam Ghanshyam, Usha Mangeshkar, Jyoti	Bhardwaj
4	"Kehne Pe Gar Main Aaya"	Mohammed Rafi, Usha Mangeshkar	Sajan Dehlvi
5	"Hum Hain Is Tarah Janaab Ke Liye"	Varsha Bhosle	Mohsin Nawab
6	"Kasam De De Ke Naa Poochho"	Krishna Kalle	Upendra
