= Ashtavinayak (film) =

- Theatrical release poster
- Directed by: Rajdutt
- Written by: Manorama Films Story Section
- Produced by: Sharad Pilgaonkar
- Starring: Sachin; Vandana Pandit; Padma Chavan; Vasantrao Deshpande; Suryakant Mandhare; Raja Gosavi
- Cinematography: Girish Karve
- Edited by: Telang Gupte
- Music by: Anil-Arun
- Production company: Manorama Films
- Release date: 16 February 1979
- Running time: 115 minutes
- Country: India
- Language: Marathi

Ashtavinayak is a Marathi-language film released on 16 February 1979. The film was directed by Rajdutt and produced by Sharad Pilgaonkar under the banner of Manorama Films. The film is based on the divine intervention to a wealthy family from Sangli in 1975.

== Plot ==
Nana Inamdar is the owner of a paper mill and a devotee of lord ganesh. The wealthy mill owner's son, Bal, returns from studying abroad with a grudge against God. He blames a cruel fate for his mother's death and a cold stepmother. Taking over the family business, Bal clashes with tradition by canceling the annual Ganesh festival, to complete increased orders but this decision angers the workers. Nana is not happy with Bal's decision but he keeps calm. Bal's stepmother is concerned about her future and asks Nana about it. Hearing it, Nana dies due to heart attack.

Soon Bal falls in love with Veena, daughter of a veteran singer. He soon proposes her. She accepts it and promises lord ganesh that they both will complete the pilgrimage of 8 famous ganesh temples after marriage. Despite his atheism, Bal soon marries Veena, a devout believer. With blessings from their elder, Sathe Kaka (manager at mill), they begin life together. However, tensions rise as Bal removes the Ganesh temple from the mill for its expansion. Veena is not happy with this decision. The couple's strained relationship is further marred by a miscarriage and Veena's health deteriorates. Doctors too lose any medical hope in her case. As misfortune continues with a fire at the mill and Bal is in serious debt. Bal's stepmother gets a psychotic attack hearing the news as she too is partner in mill. Sathe Kaka urges Veena to seek divine help by completing the pilgrimage, she had promised before marriage.

The reason behind Bal's atheism is revealed here. Bal's mother had died due to some serious ailment despite Nana providing best medical treatment. But Bal, then studying in a boarding school, is unaware of this fact and he had seen his father praying to Ganesh during last days of his mother. He had false belief that he lost his mother due to negligence and unnecessary faith in God.

They both start the pilgrimage even if Bal is hesitant in the beginning. As the pilgrimage continues, Veena's health starts improving. At the last temple, Sathe kaka arrives with a good news that they have won the suit against insurance company and their claim will soon get accepted and they would regain their lost wealth. Bal then realises the divine power of God and starts believing in it.

== Cast ==
- Sachin Pilgaonkar as Bal Inamdar
- Vandana Pandit as Veena Bhosle Inamdar
- Chandrakant Mandhare as Nana Inamdar (Bal's father)
- Padma Chavan as Maai Inamdar (Bal's step-mother)
- Raja Gosavi as Narayan "Narya" Chavan (Bal's step-uncle)
- Sharad Talwalkar as Appa "Guruji" Sathe (Nana's friend)
- Ramesh Bhatkar as Sadanand "Sadya" Sathe (Sathe Guruji's son)
- Shama Gosavi as Nayana Chavan (Narya's daughter)
- Vasantrao Deshpande as Pandit Vishwanath Bhosle (Veena's father)
- Saroj Sukhtankar as Aatya (Veena's paternal aunt)
- Madhav Achwal as Inamdars' factory worker
- Lata Thatte as Rama Sathe (Sathe Guruji's wife)

=== Special appearances during "Ashtavinayaka Tujha Mahima Kasa" song ===
- Suryakant Mandhare
- Ashok Saraf
- Usha Chavan
- Asha Kale
- Sudhir Dalvi
- Ravindra Mahajani
- Shahu Modak
- Jayashree Gadkar

== Awards and nominations ==
Awards from popular organisations
Year	Award	Category	Winner	Result
1979	Filmfare Awards Marathi	Best Actor	Sachin	Won
1979	Filmfare Awards Marathi	Best Actress	Vandana Pandit	Nominated
1979	Filmfare Awards Marathi	Best Director	Rajdutt	Nominated
1979	Maharashtra State Film Awards	Best Second Film	Sharad Pilgaonkar	Won
1979	Maharashtra State Film Awards	Best Director	Rajdutt	Won
1979	Maharashtra State Film Awards	Best Actor	Sachin	Nominated
1979	Maharashtra State Film Awards	Best Actress	Vandana Pandit	Nominated
1979	Maharashtra State Film Awards	Best Music Director	Anil-Arun	Won
1979	Maharashtra State Film Awards	Best Playback Singer – Male	Vasantrao Deshpande	Won
1979	Maharashtra State Film Awards	Best Playback Singer – Female	Anuradha Paudwal	Nominated
1979	Maharashtra State Film Awards	Best Lyricist	Shantaram Nandgaonkar	Won

== Soundtrack ==
Ashtavinayak

Soundtrack album by Anil-Arun
- Released: 1979
- Genre: Feature film soundtrack
- Length: 47:49
- Language: Marathi
- Label: Saregama

Official audio
- Ashtavinayak - Full Album on YouTube

The lyrics were penned by Shanta Shelke, Jagdish Khebudkar, Shantaram Nandgaonkar and Madhusudan Kalelkar. The songs were sung by Vasantrao Deshpande, Anuradha Paudwal, Rani Varma and Jaywant Kulkarni.

=== Track listing ===
All music is composed by Anil-Arun.

No.	Title	Lyrics	Singer (s)	Length
1.	"Tu Sukhkarta Tu Dukhharta"	Madhusudan Kalelkar	Vasantrao Deshpande, Rani Varma	5:41
2.	"Pratham Tula Vandito"	Shantaram Nandgaonkar	Vasantrao Deshpande	6:14
3.	"Ashtavinayaka Tuza Mahima Kasa"	Jagdish Khebudkar	Vasantrao Deshpande, Anuradha Paudwal, Jaywant Kulkarni, Chandrashekar Gadgil, Sharad Jambhekar, Mallesh	18:37
4.	"Aali Majhya Ghari Hi Diwali"	Madhusudan Kalelkar	Anuradha Paudwal	4:54
5.	"Disate Majala Sukh Chitra Nave"	Shanta Shelke	Anuradha Paudwal	4:56
6.	"Datun Kanth Yeto"	Shantaram Nandgaonkar	Vasantrao Deshpande	5:58
7.	"Ooth Mukunda Ooth Shridhara"	Shanta Shelke	Anuradha Paudwal	1:03
Total length:				47:49
