= Priya Tendulkar =

Indian actress (1954-2002)

- Born: 19 October 1954; Bombay, Bombay State, India
- Died: 19 September 2002 (aged 47); Mumbai, Maharashtra, India
- Spouse: Karan Razdan (m. 1988; sep. 1995)

Priya Tendulkar (19 October 1954 – 19 September 2002) was an Indian actress, social activist and a writer, who is most known for her eponymous role in the television series Rajani (1985).

== Early life ==
Priya displayed an inclination towards art and culture from her childhood, as her father was the eminent popular writer and Padma bhushan awardee Vijay Tendulkar.

== Career ==
Her first appearance was as a doll in a stage play called Hayavadana (1969), along with Kalpana Lajmi. Later, she shuffled between different jobs as a hotel service receptionist in a 5 star hotel, an air hostess, and a part-time model, and also she was a news reader.

Her debut film appearance was in Shyam Benegal's Ankur (1974), where she played Anant Nag's submissive wife. Thereafter, she switched her interest towards Marathi films and played stellar roles in nearly a dozen Marathi family socials, opposite actors like Ashok Saraf, Ravindra Mahajani and Mahesh Kothare. She also appears opposite to Anant Nag in the Kannada movie Minchina Ota, in an important role.

She rose to national fame with her TV series Rajani (1985), where she played a housewife who can't stand any injustice and solves public social issues. Her portrayal of Rajani made her a household name all over India. Later, she played a role in Vijay Tendulkar's TV series, Swayamsiddha.

Priya led a freestyle life wherein she spoke about social issues openly without fear and consistently expressed her feelings without bias or prejudice. This side of her personality reflected in her talk shows like Priya Tendulkar Talk Show and Zimmedar Kaun.

She also played an important role as actress in a Gujarati movie named Pooja Na Phool, which was a very popular movie of the time.

She has also played a role in Hum Panch TV series and she got very famous with that role.

== Personal life ==
She married her Rajani co-star, Karan Razdan, in 1988 but they separated in 1995.

== Death ==
Priya died following a heart attack on 19 September 2002 at her Prabhadevi residence after a long battle with breast cancer.

== Filmography ==
=== Film ===
Year	Title	Role	Notes
1974	Ankur	Saru	
1980	Minchina Ota	Tony's Wife	Kannada language film
1981	Gondhalat Gondhal	Hemangi (Hema)	
1982	Thorli Jaau	Namita	
1982	Malavarcha Phool	Tara	
1982	Mai Baap	Reema	
1983	Devta	Anagya	
1983	Ranine Daav Jinkla	Anu	
1984	Mahadaan	Priya	
1984	Mumbaicha Faujdar	Madhuri Yadav	
1984	Maherchi Manse	Vasudha	
1985	Vivek		
1985	Nasoor	Dr. Yashoda Gore	
1986	Sasti Dulhan Mahenga Dulha	Anuradha / Anu	
1986	Raat Ke Baad		
1987	Besahara	Charu	
1987	Majaal	Dr. Lalitha	
1987	Navrayane Sodli		
1987	Naam O Nishan	Geeta	
1988	Sila	Priya Das	
1988	Kaal Chakra	Anjali Pradhan	
1988	Insaaf Ki Jung		
1989	Shagun		
1994	Mohra	Pooja	Special appearance
1994	Maza Saubhagya	Durga Sarlaskar	
1995	Trimurti	Satyadevi Singh	
1997	Gupt	Sharda Sinha	
1997	Aur Pyaar Ho Gaya	Mrs. Malhotra	
1999	Prem Shastra		
2000	Raja Ko Rani Se Pyar Ho Gaya	Mohit's Mother	Uncredited
2001	Pyaar Ishq Aur Mohabbat	Mrs. Bhardwaj	Final film role

=== Television ===
Year	Title	Role
1985	Rajani	Rajani
1987	Asmita	Asmita
1995–1999	Hum Paanch	Anand Mathur's first wife
1996–1998	Yug	Ratna
1996	Itihaas	
1996	Aahat	Rakhi
1997	Damini	Mrunalini Ranganekar
1998	Aangan	
1999	Professor Pyarelal	Sajni Pyarelal Chaturvedi
