= Navri Mile Navryala =

1984 film by Sachin Pilgaonkar

- Theatrical release poster
- Directed by: Sachin Pilgaonkar
- Written by: Sachin Pilgaonkar
- Screenplay by: Vasant Sabnis
- Produced by: Satish Kulkarni
- Starring: Ashok Saraf; Sachin Pilgaonkar; Supriya Pilgaonkar; Nivedita Joshi; Sanjay Jog; Neelima Parandekar; Shrikant Moghe; Ashalata Wabgaonkar; Jairam Kulkarni; Daya Dongre
- Cinematography: Suryakant Lavande; Sameer Athalye
- Edited by: Avinash Thakur; Chintu Dhavale
- Music by: Anil-Arun
- Production company: Shree Tulsi Productions
- Release date: 1984
- Running time: 147 minutes
- Country: India
- Language: Marathi

Navri Mile Navryala (translation: The Groom Finds A Bride) is a 1984 Indian Marathi-language comedy film written and directed by Sachin Pilgaonkar and produced by Satish Kulkarni under the production banner of Shree Tulsi Productions. The film stars an ensemble cast of Ashok Saraf, Sachin Pilgaonkar, Supriya Pilgaonkar, Nivedita Joshi, Sanjay Jog, Neelima Parandekar, Shrikant Moghe, Ashalata Wabgaonkar, Jairam Kulkarni and Daya Dongre. Anil-Arun composed the music, and the film garnered critical acclaim upon its release."

== Plot ==
The Deshmukhs and Inamdars are neighbours. In the Inamdar household, the matriarch Maasaheb (Daya Dongre) wields strict control with an iron fist and enforces discipline. On the contrary, the Deshmukh clan adopts a freewheeling lifestyle from the patriarch Bhaurao Deshmukh (Shrikant Moghe), indifferent to the judgements of others. In an intriguing twist, Jairam (Sachin Pilgaonkar), a key figure in the Deshmukh household, and Chameli (Supriya Pilgaonkar), the maid employed by the Inamdars, hatch a plan with the help of Mr. Deshmukh's wife, Mrs. Deshmukh (Ashalata Wabgaonkar), and Maasaheb's widowed son, Nanasaheb (Jairam Kulkarni). Their goal is to bridge the gap between these two contrasting families, by making the Inamdars' son, Balasaheb (Ashok Saraf), fall in love with the Deshmukhs' daughter, Rashmi (Neelima Parandekar), and the Inamdars' daughter, Kaladevi (Nivedita Joshi), with the Deshmukhs' son, Ramesh (Sanjay Jog), aiming to bring about a resolution to their longstanding differences once and for all.

== Cast ==
- Ashok Saraf as Balasaheb Nanasaheb Inamdar
- Sachin Pilgaonkar as Jairam
- Supriya Pilgaonkar as Chameli
- Nivedita Joshi Saraf as Kaladevi Nanasaheb Inamdar
- Sanjay Jog as Ramesh Bhaurao Deshmukh
- Neelima Parandekar as Rashmi Bhaurao Deshmukh
- Shrikant Moghe as Bhaurao Deshmukh
- Ashalata Wabgaonkar as Mrs. Bhaurao Deshmukh
- Jairam Kulkarni as Nanasaheb Inamdar
- Daya Dongre as Maasaheb Inamdar
- Madhu Apte as Contractor Mehta's assistant
- Janardhan Parab as Fake astrologer
- Praveen Kumar Sobti as Chameli's molester

== Soundtrack ==
Navri Mile Navryala

Soundtrack album by Anil-Arun
- Released: 1984
- Genre: Feature film soundtrack
- Length: 24:55
- Language: Marathi
- Label: T-Series

Music video

The music is composed by Anil-Arun and lyrics penned by Shantaram Nandgaonkar.

Track listing
No.	Title	Singer (s)	Length
1.	"Aala Jairam Aala"	Sachin Pilgaonkar	4:53
2.	"Nishana Tula Disla Na"	Suresh Wadkar, Anuradha Paudwal	5:53
3.	"Hi Navri Asli"	Sachin Pilgaonkar, Anuradha Paudwal	5.03
4.	"Sajani Mohini"	Anuradha Paudwal, Kavita Krishnamurthy, Shailendra Singh, Rani Varma	8:06
Total length:			24:55

== Awards and nominations ==
Year	Award	Category	Recipient	Result	Ref
1985	Filmfare Awards Marathi	Filmfare Award for Best Actress – Marathi	Supriya Pilgaonkar	Won	
