= Insaan Bana Shaitan =

Insaan Bana Shaitan is a Hindi horror film of Bollywood directed by Mohan Bhakri and produced by Dalwinder Sohal. This film was released on 18 August 1992.

== Plot ==
A young couple Raja and Rita are driving through a dense forest. They stop to take rest in an alienated bungalow without knowing that it is haunted. They are extremely tired and fall asleep as soon as they hit the bed. As soon as the clock strikes 12, the ghost comes out of its hiding at midnight at 0000 hours sharp and brutally murders them both in their sleep.

== Cast ==
- Deepak Parashar as Inspector
- Anil Dhawan as Anand
- Jagdeep as Rangeela
- Tej Sapru as Mahesh
- Bharat Kapoor as Sampat Rai
- Shiva Rindani as Sunita's boyfriend
- Sanjay Jog as Ravi
- Neelam Mehra as Namita Kapoor
- Huma Khan as Chamelibai
- Upasana Singh as Sunita
- Mohini
