= Runh =

- Poster
- Directed by: Vishal Gaikwad
- Starring: Manoj Joshi; Narayani Shastri; Rajeshwari Sachdev; Omkar Goverdhan
- Cinematography: Najeeb Khan
- Edited by: Faisal Mahadik
- Music by: Sangeet Siddharth
- Release date: 15 May 2015
- Country: India
- Language: Marathi

Runh is a 2015 Indian Marathi-language film directed by Vishal Gaikwad and produced Mukund Mhatre and Eknath Bhopi. stars Manoj Joshi, Narayani Shastri, Rajeshwari Sachdev, Omkar Goverdhan, along with Vinay Apte, Vijay Patkar, Anant Jog, Vivek Lagoo, Usha Naik and Jayraj Nayar in supporting roles.

== Cast ==
- Manoj Joshi
- Narayani Shastri
- Rajeshwari Sachdev
- Omkar Goverdhan
- Vinay Apte
- Vijay Patkar
- Anant Jog
- Vivek Lagoo
- Usha Naik
- Jayraj Nayar

== Reception ==
Suhas Joshi form Loksatta Wrote "Although the film has done a scientific study that should be done by the filmmakers while dealing with the subject outside the job, the film keeps creating doubts in your mind as it does not reach the audience in an easy way. That's why it is certain that the gap regarding the marginalized in the society is visible from the dramatic plot, but it is not bridged". Mihir Bhanage form The Times of India Wrote "She looks and essays the role of a eunuch (a rare occasion when a woman is doing so) perfectly. For the story and performances, this film deserves to be watched". Ganesh Matkari form Pune Mirror says "The film struggles too much to find the right note, and loses what it had gained. Still, if you are willing to ignore the missteps (quite a few of them, in fact), the film leaves an impact". Saumitra Pote from Maharashtra Times says "Among the actors, Narayani Shastri, Omkar Govardhan, Manoj Joshi all have done well. However, the presentation does not stand up to the sloppiness of the screenplay. The song 'Bhirbhirati Tujbhavati' is audible and lip-smacking".
