= Beta Ho To Aisa =

- Promotional Poster
- Directed by: C.P. Dixit
- Written by: Kehsav rathod; Ram Govind
- Produced by: Praveen Khanna
- Starring: Govinda; Varsha Usgaonkar
- Cinematography: Munir khan
- Edited by: Hussain Burmawala
- Music by: Ravindra Jain
- Release date: 21 October 1994
- Country: India
- Language: Hindi
- Box office: ₹1.38 crore

Beta Ho To Aisa is a 1994 Hindi film directed by C.P. Dixit and produced by Praveen Khanna, starring Govinda, Varsha Usgaonkar, Gulshan Grover and Raza Murad in pivotal role.

== Plot ==
Anand is an honest man in a remote city with his pregnant wife Laxmi raising his two adolescent sons: Suraj and Chandar, serviced by a loyal domestic help Dinu and his son Raju whom they have bought up as their own. When Anand and an anguished heir JK witness goons taking real gold; the caravan is plundered for selfish motives. Anand tricks JK and hides the same, arousing the man's wrath though not before he has displaced Lakshmi's family to another city.

Gullible Raju with his friend Bantu then take to a rotten life to care for his alive foster mother and family. Educated Suraj and Chander have now grown up. Their sister Asha falls in love with one Ravi. Raju and Jk's daughter Mini fall in love, while Suraj and Chandar are now under Jk. Mini's brother Rakesh helps his father in daily chores. Meanwhile, when Laxmi discovers Raju's means she abandons him. Suraj is supposed to marry Mini but there is a turn of events.

Old Laxmi finally realises that she can only trust Raju who craves her blessings. Laxmi and her daughter Asha leave Ravi and Chander and stay put with poor Raju. Later Asha is doomed and tries to kill herself. While devastated Mini discovers that JK is actually his distant caretaker uncle. Yearning for lost gold and her property pushes Mini's uncle off limits as he crosses paths with her love interest Raju once again with latter finally discovering even his lost foster father; real of Suraj and Chander. In the end good prevails over bad as Anand and Lakhsmi look on.

== Cast ==
- Govinda as Raju: Dinu's son
- Varsha Usgaonkar as Mini: J.K.'s daughter/ Raju's love interest
- Vijayendra Ghatge as Anand: a forest officer
- Anjana Mumtaz as Laxmi: Raju's step-mother
- Rakesh Pandey as Dinubhai: Anand's servant; Raju's father
- Mohan Bhandari as Chander: Raju's step-brother
- Sanjay Jog as Suraj: Raju's step-brother
- Anuradha Sawant as Asha: Raju's step-sister
- Asrani as Bantu: Raju's friend
- Raza Murad as Kunwer / Raja Saheb/ J.K.
- Gulshan Grover as Rakesh: J.K.'s son
- Sharat Saxena as Raaka / Ramakant: a CID Officer
- Viju Khote as eye wit Poojari
- Daboo Malik as Ravi: a Police Inspector; Asha's husband
- Amrit Patel (actor) as Kasturilal
- Asha Sharma as Manager of women's shelter
- Sudhir as J.K.'s henchman
- Ajit Vachani as Police Inspector Ram Singh
- Praveen Kumar as Ranjeet: J.K.'s henchman
- Savita Bajaj as Ramakanth Mother (cameo)
- Ramesh Goyal as S.P.

== Soundtrack ==
All songs were written and composed by Ravindra Jain.

#	Song	Singer
1	"Teri Zindadili Mujhe Maar Gayi"	Asha Bhosle
2	"Tu neh ka Naata Tod Chala"	Hemlata
3	"Main Teri Yashoda Maiya"	Hemlata
4	"Tu Meri Yashoda Maiya"	Mohammed Aziz
5	"Woh Meri Yashoda Maiya"	Mohammed Aziz
6	"Badlenge Jab Din Inke"	Mohammed Aziz
7	"Raat Muraadonwali"	Mohammed Aziz, Kavita Krishnamurthy
