= Kalavantin =

- Theatrical release poster
- Directed by: Anant Mane
- Produced by: Chelaram Bhatia Lalchand Bhatia
- Starring: Avinash Masurekar Usha Naik Kuldeep Pawar; Ranjana (special appearance)
- Music by: Ram Kadam
- Release date: 28 October 1978
- Country: India
- Language: Marathi

Kalavantin is a Marathi film released on 28 October 1978. Produced by Chelaram Bhatia along with Lalchand Bhatia and directed by Anant Mane.

== Cast ==
Avinash Masurekar

Usha Naik

Ganpat Patil

Kuldeep Pawar

Ranjana (special appearance).

== Producers ==
The Bhatia Duo: Chelaram Bhatia and Lalchand Bhatia.(Glamour Films)

== Soundtrack ==
The music is provided by Ram Kadam.

- "Kapaad Purnea Cholia" - Usha Mangeshkar
- "Pikalya Panacha Deth" - Usha Mangeshkar
- "Jhananana Jhananana Jhankar" - Usha Mangeshkar
- "Raat Jhurtiya Chandrasathi" - Shobha Gurtu
- "Mee Ek Roop Vhave" - Suresh Wadkar
