= Chaand Kaa Tukdaa =

1994 Indian film by Saawan Kumar Tak

- Movie poster
- Directed by: Saawan Kumar Tak
- Written by: Anwar Khan (dialogues)
- Screenplay by: Sachin Bhowmick
- Story by: Saawan Kumar Tak
- Produced by: Saawan Kumar Tak
- Starring: Sridevi; Salman Khan; Shatrughan Sinha
- Cinematography: G. Shyam Kumar
- Edited by: Jawahar Razdan
- Music by: Mahesh-Kishor (songs), Usha Khanna (BGM)
- Production company: Saawan Kumar Productions
- Release date: 19 August 1994
- Running time: 155 minutes
- Country: India
- Language: Hindi
- Budget: ₹2.75 crore
- Box office: ₹3.88 crore

Chaand Kaa Tukdaa (transl. A piece of the moon) is a 1994 Indian Hindi-language film produced and directed by Saawan Kumar Tak starring Sridevi, Salman Khan and Shatrughan Sinha.

== Plot ==
Shyam lives a wealthy lifestyle in London, England, and is considered one of the ten richest people in the world. His father, S.K. Malhotra, was killed, and his mother identified his killer, but before this person could be apprehended, she, herself passes away, but not before asking Shyam to return to India and marry a beautiful girl. Shyam does return to India, and once there does meet the girl, Radha, of his dreams, but does not know that Radha is a mere pawn in the hands of a group of people, including his father's killer, who are after his wealth and estate, and will do anything in their power to obtain it.

== Cast ==
- Salman Khan as Shyam Malhotra
- Sridevi as Radha Malhotra
- Shatrughan Sinha as SP Shatrughan Sinha / Zevago
- Anupam Kher as Hasmukh Khurana
- Raza Murad as Sohan Singh
- Mehmood as Babumoshay
- Rakesh Hans as Rakesh H. Khurana
- Zeba Khan as Minoo
- Rama Vij as Mrs. Malhotra
- Faiyyaz
- Raviraaj
- Hitesh Malhotra as Master Tintin
- Gurbachan Singh as Babbar
- Lalit Tiwari as Raja Saheb
- Guddi Maruti as Babu's eldest daughter
- Anil Nagrath as Cooper (doctor)
- Sahila Chadha – Special appearance in "Aaja Dewaane"

== Production ==
Recalling his pairing with Sridevi, actor Salman Khan said, he was scared to share the screen space with the actress, as she was capable of making the audience concentrate on herself, neglecting her co-stars.

== Soundtrack ==
Song	Singer
"Aaja Lootere Aaja"	Asha Bhosle
"Darwaja Khula Rakhna"	Asha Bhosle
"Jo Peete Nahin Sharab, Woh Log Hain Kharab"	Asha Bhosle, Jolly Mukherjee
"Tu Ladka Hai London Ka, Main Ladki Hindustani"	Asha Bhosle, Vipin Sachdeva
"Dil Deewana Dhundh Raha Hai Mere Roothe Yaar Ko"	Lata Mangeshkar, Vipin Sachdeva
"I Am Very Very Sorry, Tera Naam Bhool Gayi"	Lata Mangeshkar, Vipin Sachdeva
"Aaj Radha Ko Shyam Yaad"	Lata Mangeshkar
"Tu Lage Chand Ka Tukda"	Vipin Sachdeva
