= Gondhalat Gondhal =

- Directed by: V. K. Naik
- Screenplay by: Vasant Sabnis
- Story by: Raja Paragaonkar
- Produced by: Datta Malvankar
- Starring: Ashok Saraf; Ranjana; Ravindra Mahajani; Priya Tendulkar; Sanjay Jog; Kavita Kiran
- Cinematography: Shreenivas Mahapatra
- Edited by: Sanjeev Naik
- Music by: Vishwanath More
- Production company: Smita Arts
- Release date: 20 October 1981
- Country: India
- Language: Marathi

Gondhalat Gondhal (transl. Confusion in confusion) is a Marathi-language romantic comedy film was released on 20 October 1981. It was directed by V. K. Naik and produced by Datta Malvankar under the banner of Smita Arts. It stars Ashok Saraf, Ranjana, Ravindra Mahajani, Priya Tendulkar in main roles.

== Plot ==
Ravi (Ravindra Mahajani), a disciplined and punctual man, is well settled in Bombay, while his father, Aabasaheb (Dinanath Takalkar), lives in Kolhapur and wishes to see him married. During a journey, Ravi meets Hema (Priya Tendulkar), and the two fall in love before eventually getting married. Ravi's close friend, Madan (Ashok Saraf), is a struggling theatre artist who often pretends to be a film hero and is known for flirting with women. However, he genuinely falls in love with Mangala (Ranjana). After Ravi and Hema's wedding, Ravi immediately returns to work because of his dedication to his job. Hoping the newlyweds can enjoy some time together, Madan arranges for them to go on a honeymoon. Meanwhile, he and Mangala move into Ravi's bungalow, where Madan introduces Ravi and Hema as his paying guests.

When Ravi and Hema return, they help unite Madan and Mangala in marriage. As time passes, Hema grows frustrated with Ravi's excessive punctuality and work-oriented lifestyle. Ravi eventually begins to change his outlook when Parvati (Kavita Kiran), a relative of his employer, comes to stay at their home while researching Marathi culture. The situation becomes complicated when Mangala discovers a love letter in Madan's pocket. Misunderstandings and suspicions arise, leading both Hema and Mangala to question their husbands' loyalty. The resulting confusion gives rise to a series of humorous incidents before the misunderstandings are finally resolved.

== Cast ==
- Ashok Saraf as Madan Kumar
- Ranjana as Mangala
- Ravindra Mahajani as Ravindra (Ravi) Ghatge
- Priya Tendulkar as Hemangi (Hema) Mohite
- Sanjay Jog as Vinayak
- Kavita Kiran as Parvati
- Dinanath Takalkar as Aabasaheb Ghatge
- Macchindra Kambli as Raja
- Raghvendra Kadkol as A. V. Subramaniam
- Janardan Parab as Theatre group owner
- Usha Naik as Lavani dancer in special appearance

== Soundtrack ==
The music for the film was composed by Vishwanath More, with lyrics penned by Jagdish Khebudkar. The soundtrack album was officially released under the Saregama label in 1981.

#	Title	Singer(s)	Duration
1	"Swapnat Sajana Yeshil Ka"	Asha Bhosle	04:46
2	"Aga Naach Naach Radhe"	Suresh Wadkar, Uttara Kelkar	05:09
3	"Doghe Lutuya Rangbahar"	Suresh Wadkar, Uttara Kelkar	04:49
4	"Mangala Ga Mangala"	Asha Bhosle, Suresh Wadkar	05:36
5	"Dolyala Dola Hataat Haat"	Suresh Wadkar, Uttara Kelkar	03:05

== Release and reception ==
Upon its theatrical release in 1981, Gondhalat Gondhal emerged as a major commercial success. The film achieved a "Silver Jubilee" milestone by completing a continuous 25-week theatrical run in cinema halls across Maharashtra.

== Accolades ==
The film received significant recognition at the 1981 Maharashtra State Film Awards and the Filmfare Awards South/Marathi ceremonies:

Year	Award	Category	Recipient(s)	Result
1981	Maharashtra State Film Awards	Best Second Film	Datta Malvankar	Won
1981	Maharashtra State Film Awards	Best Second Director	V.K. Naik	Won
1981	Maharashtra State Film Awards	Best Dialogue	Vasant Sabnis	Won
1981	Maharashtra State Film Awards	Best Supporting Actor	Ashok Saraf	Won
1981	Maharashtra State Film Awards	Best Music Director	Vishwanath More	Won
1981–82	Filmfare Awards	Best Actor	Ashok Saraf	Won
