= Pinjara (film) =

- VCD cover
- Directed by: V. Shantaram
- Written by: Shankar Babaji Patil
- Produced by: V. Shantaram
- Starring: Shriram Lagoo; Sandhya; Nilu Phule
- Cinematography: Shivaji Sawant
- Edited by: V. Shantaram; Jayesh Dalal
- Music by: Ram Kadam; Jagdish Khebudkar (lyrics)
- Production company: Rajkamal Kalamandir
- Release date: 31 March 1972
- Running time: 175 minutes
- Country: India
- Languages: Marathi; Hindi
- Budget: 5 lakh
- Box office: ₹ 90 lakh

Pinjara (transl. Cage) is a 1972 Indian Marathi-language film directed and produced by V. Shantaram, starring Shriram Lagoo and Sandhya in the lead roles. In 1972, the film was also released in Hindi with the same title.

Set in the Tamasha folk musical theatre of Maharashtra, the film is about a morally righteous school teacher, Lagoo, who wants to reform a Tamasha performer, played by Sandhya, but ends up falling in love with her. It is an adaptation of Heinrich Mann's 1905 novel Professor Unrat (Professor Garbage). The film is known for its music and dance numbers with music by Ram Kadam. The lead actress is Sandhya, known for her dancing prowess. It is also the film debut of noted theatre actor Shriram Lagoo. The film was remade by Shantaram in Hindi with same cast and title, and even the songs like "Mala Lagali Kunachi Uchaki", which were a big hit in the Marathi version, were re-recorded in the Hindi version.

This was the last major film by the veteran director, who had made classics like Duniya Na Mane (1937), Do Aankhen Barah Haath (1957) and Navrang (1959). Produced in colour, it was replete with catchy dance numbers sung by Lata Mangeshkar and Usha Mangeshkar. Prior to its release, one reel of the film was test-screened in the theatres, to check colour reproduction. It went on to become one of the biggest commercial successes of its time and ran for 134 weeks in Pune. This also led to the introduction of colour films in Marathi cinema. In 1973, it won the National Film Award for Best Feature Film in Marathi for the year 1972.

== Synopsis ==
The film is a loose adaptation of the first major German sound film The Blue Angel (1930; based on Heinrich Mann's 1905 novel Professor Unrat).

Shridhar Pant (widely known as Guruji) is an upright school teacher, a man of high morals and ideals. He teaches and educates the children as well as the illiterate adults of a village in the same school, where he stays. Owing to his efforts, the village is declared as an ideal village in the entire district. Unfortunately, a group of notorious people headed by the son of the Sarpanch, does not value and respect these moral qualities. One day, a Tamasha (folk art of Maharashtra) group comes to the village. The lead dancer of the group, Chandrakala steals the heart of every man in the village with her dance and style. Guruji is righteously infuriated by their lack of morals. He strictly denies them a place in the village for their performance, as he believes that it can spoil the villagers' minds and their future. Chandrakala tries to confront him but fails and returns with the entire troupe in anger. Her ego is so hurt that she decides to take revenge by staying and performing at a place on the outskirts of the village. On the way, she stops everyone and asks them to settle there, set the tents and establish a stage where she can perform. The next day, she starts performing. The adult students all hear the loud music and bunk class to see her perform. When Guruji learns this, he vents his anger on the dance troupe and scolds everyone. He demolishes the tents and everything there. Chandrakala vows that one day she will make Guruji play a minor instrument in her dance performance.

Despite this, the villagers do not listen to Guruji and keep skipping classes to see Chandrakala's dance. A furious Guruji goes there and tries to confront Chandrakala. Meanwhile, Chandrakala slips on the floor and is badly injured. In humanity and humility Guruji helps her. By the time Chandrakala recovers, he is overwhelmed by a lust that he has never before encountered or felt. Horrified, he asks her to keep their meeting a secret, but, later on he starts visiting her secretly and thus his love for Chandrakala gradually develops.

Later, the son of the Sarpanch, who is against the teacher, finds him visiting Chandrakala on a daily basis. One evening, he calls his father and all the villagers to see Guruji with Chandrakala, but they don't find him. Guruji is deeply hurt as he deceives the villagers. Bajirao tries to frame Guruji in a molestation case. But a villager (milkman) who seeks revenge on Bajirao, kills him (because in the past Bajirao tried to molest his wife). When they see Bajirao's corpse in the school, Chandrakala and Guruji exchange his clothes with those of Guruji. Chandrakala then asks Guruji to flee with her. On that stormy night, when the villagers come to know through a local clown that a murder has taken place, they gather near the dead body lying in the school. Because of the dark, the villagers only see Guruji's clothes on the dead body, and they believe that their Guruji has been killed. Chandrakala takes Guruji with her and keeps him in disguise as a Mastar, a Tamasha worker. Here, Mastar is badly humiliated by the leader of the troupe every now and then. In deep shock, he eventually becomes addicted to alcohol and tobacco. The villagers, on the other side, unveil a Statue of Guruji in the school compound itself, as a tribute to his noble deeds and his ideals. They also file a police complaint and request a detailed investigation of Guruji's murder.

During one dance show, when one artist is ill, guruji plays a minor instrument and Chandrakala's vow comes true. After realizing that she has brought a noble man like Guruji to her level, and is solely responsible for his downfall, Chandrakala decides to mend her ways. She leaves the dance troupe after a quarrel. She and Guruji leave, but he gets arrested by the police. Guruji is charged for his own murder as his fingerprints match with the fingerprints present on the murder weapon (as before exchanging the clothes, Guruji had removed the weapon from Bajirao:s body). He decides to end his life rather than face the villagers. Chandrakala tries to defend him and meets him in Jail. She tells him that she will tell the truth in court - that Guruji is alive and Mastar only is their Guruji. How can he murder himself? Therefore, he is innocent. Guruji tells her how people love his thoughts, his deeds and how in his memory they have built his statue. He decides that he should be punished for deceiving the villagers. He believes that he should live on in their memory as the noble Guruji, not as the murderer Mastar. He decides to sacrifice himself for the long life of Guruji's deeds and morals. Here fate takes a twist. In court, while telling the truth to the judge, a shocked Chandrakala loses her voice. Mastar is asked about his stance on the case, and to defend himself. He confesses to the crime and pleads that it is a ghastly act done by him and requests the court to give him the harshest punishment. The court sentences him to death. On the announcement of a death sentence, Chandrakala, in deep shock, loses consciousness and dies on the spot. Mastar sees Chandrakala dead and believes she died before him so they can meet on the other side. Mastar is shown being taken to jail and presumably his punishment is carried out.

Pinjara is the tragic love story of a school teacher and a dancer. The title Pinjara, meaning 'the cage', is a metaphor for life. The dancer dies as she feels guilty about what she has brought Guruji down to, and for not saving him. The teacher chooses to die under mistaken identity, to keep the morals and values of Guruji in the minds of the villagers intact, rather than living as a man who has lost respect in his own eyes. How the dead couple's death frees them from their 'cages' of guilt, is the crux of the story.

== Cast ==
- Shreeram Lagoo as Shridhar Pant (Guruji)
- Sandhya Shantaram as Chandrakala Chandrawalkar (dancer)
- Nilu Phule as Sarkar; Leader of dance troupe
- Vatsala Deshmukh as Akka Chandrawalkar; Sister of Chandrakala
- Ganpat Patil as Nachya
- Maya Jadhav as Troupe dancer
- Usha Naik as Troupe dancer
- Sarala Yeolekar as Villager
- Bhalchandra Kulkarni as Police Inspector
- Syadri Sharma as Nurse

== Production ==
The principal photography was held at Kolhapur. It is the first Marathi movie made in colour and filmed on 35 mm movie film. In 2016, it was re-released after digitally remastered. In post-production, V Shantaram made the films 18 prints.

== Release ==
The film was released on 31 March 1972.

== Awards ==
- 1972: National Film Award for Best Feature Film in Marathi

== Soundtrack ==
The film's soundtrack was composed by Ram Kadam, with lyrics by Jagdish Khebudkar.

=== Track list ===
The following table shows the tracks and their respective duration in the film.

| Track # | Song | Singer | Duration (minutes) |
|---|---|---|---|
| 1 | "Aali Thumkat Naar Lachkat" | Vishnu Waghmare | 03:41 |
| 2 | "Chhabidar Chhabi Mi" | Usha Mangeshkar | 03:28 |
| 3 | "De Re Kanha Choli Un Lugdi" | Lata Mangeshkar | 07:33 |
| 4 | "Disala Ga Bai Disala" | Usha Mangeshkar | 04:56 |
| 5 | "Ishqachi Ingali Dasli" | Usha Mangeshkar | 04:59 |
| 6 | "Kashi Nashibana Thatta Aaj Mandli" | Sudhir Phadke, Usha Mangeshkar | 04:00 |
| 7 | "Mala Lagali Kunachi Uchaki" | Usha Mangeshkar | 03:03 |
| 8 | "Naka Todu Pavan Jara Thamba" | Usha Mangeshkar | 03:23 |
| 9 | "Tumhawar Keli Mi Marji Bahal" | Usha Mangeshkar | 03:27 |
