= Jau Tithe Khau =

- Theatrical release poster
- Directed by: Abhay Kirti
- Produced by: Meghraj Rajebhosle
- Starring: Makarand Anaspure; Kuldeep Pawar; Chetan Dalvi; Deepali Sayyad
- Music by: Tyagraj Khadilkar
- Release date: 8 February 2007
- Country: India
- Language: Marathi

Jau Tithe Khau (transl. literally, 'Eat wherever we go', but metaphorically means 'Bribes wherever we go') is a Marathi movie released on 8 February 2007. Produced by Meghraj Shahjirao Rajebhosle and directed by Abhay Kirti. The movie is based on the life of a protagonist who is fed up of corruption everywhere and decides to teach everyone a lesson.

The movie is based on the story Phulwa Ka Pul by Sanjeev and Sumitra Motilal Halawai's short story Baavi Kaledide which went on to be adapted into 2017 Kannada movie Sarkari Kelasa Devara Kelasa. The movie was remade in Hindi as Well Done Abba.

== Synopsis ==
Mukund (Makarand Anaspure) is hard working and intelligent young man, who is unable to find a job. He faces a lot of issues in his day-to-day life for the things which he has to depend on. Every public officer he meets like at electricity board, pension office etc. ask him for bribe to carry out the work. Enraged by this behavior and the corrupt political system he decides to fight against the system. He is helped by his girlfriend Lekha (Deepali Sayyad) and few friends. Based upon this help he applies for a government scheme in which the person is entitled for loan approval on getting a well dug. By bribing all the officers in the loop, he manages to get the loan approved without even digging the well.

At the climax he files a case in the police station and court about his well getting stolen. At first he is held as a mad man, because a well, a solid structure can't be stolen. But then Mukund presents the proofs on the paper about the well being dug. The court has to accept the proof and declare that the well was indeed stolen. Mukund wins the Lawsuit.

However Mukund rejects the decision by himself and explain the people the real situation and warns them about the current state of corruption in the country. The film ends on the note that "Today a well is proven to be stolen, Don't let the country to be proved stolen" as addressed by Mukund to the people.

== Cast ==
The cast includes Makarand Anaspure, Kuldeep Pawar, Chetan Dalvi, Deepali Sayyad & Others.

== Soundtrack ==
The music is provided by Tyagraj Khadilkar.

=== Track listing ===
No.	Title	Length
1.	"Hirva Kancharana"
2.	"Phad Phad Udto"
