= Ram Kadam (composer) =

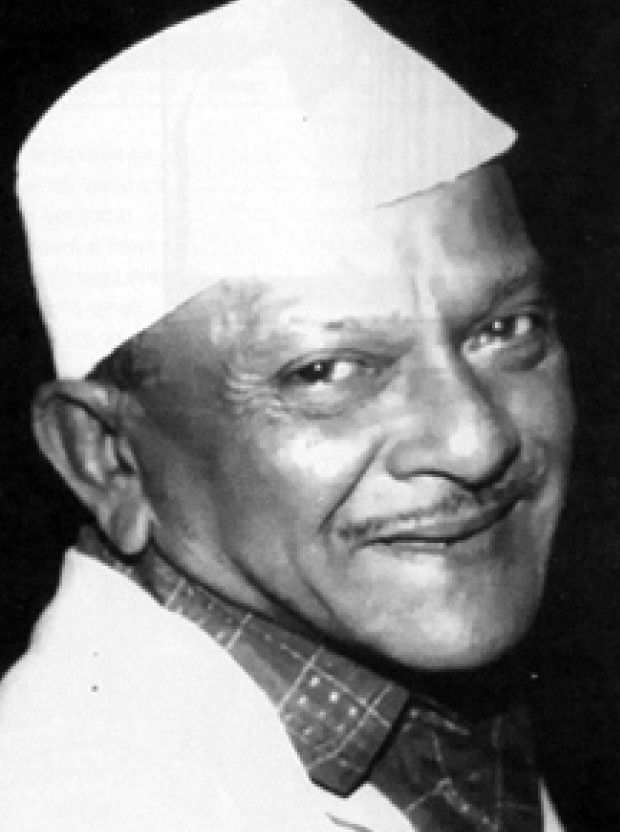

Background information
- Born: 28 August 1918
- Died: 19 February 1997 (aged 78) Pune, Maharashtra
- Occupations: Lavani and film music composer
- Years active: 1940s–1990s

Ram Kadam (28 August 1918 – 19 February 1997) was a noted Indian lavani composer and film score composer, who worked in Marathi cinema, from the 1940s to the 1990s, composing for nearly 200 films. He is most known for composing Lavani songs, a folk form of Maharashtra, and popular Lavani-based songs of hit film, Pinjra (1972), directed by V. Shantaram. He also composed music for plays.

== Early life and background ==
Kadam initially played the clarinet in a band at Miraj, in southern Maharashtra. Thereafter, he learnt classical singing from noted classical singer Ustad Abdul Karim Khan, the doyen of Kirana gharana at Miraj. Subsequently, he also learned Lavani style of folk singing from noted Tamasha-singer Patthe Bapurao.

== Career ==
Kadam started his film career as an office boy at the Prabhat Films based in Pune, co-founded by V. Shantaram, soon he started assisting music director, Sudhir Phadke. His first break as an independent music director came with Meeth Bhakar (1949) directed by Bhalji Pendharkar, he continued to work at Prabhat for the next nine years, before working independently. His noted films were Gavgund (1951), Sangte Aika (1959) directed by Anant Mane and Pinjra directed by V. Shantaram, which was a big hit, and still remembered for his songs. He also composed music for plays like Nartaki and Katha Aklechya Kandyachi.

In time, Kadam became noted lavani composer, beside being a leading composer of Marathi cinema, and composed music score for around 200 films, and later in his career became a film producer. He co-produced a tamasha-theme film Kela Ishara Jaata Jaata (1965) with frequent collaborators lyricist Jagdish Khebudkar and director Anant Mane . Thereafter he co-produced films, like Sugandhi Katta and Choricha Mamla.

Their success led to him forming his own production house called "Chitra Mauli". In 1985, he wrote, produced and directed his first film, Gad Jejuri Jejuri, starring Jaymala Kale, and actor Nana Patekar in his Marathi film debut. The film had lyrics by P. Savalaram and G. D. Madgulkar. The film however was never commercially released.

His last film as a composer was Painjan (1995) directed by Ajay Sarpotdar.

He died on 19 February 1997, in Pune, at the age of 79. His biography, Chhinni Hatodyacha Ghaav was written by Madhu Potdar.

== Personal life ==
He has two sons, Vijay and Uday Kadam. His elder son Vijay Kadam is also a music composer.

== Filmography ==
=== Composer ===
- Kela Ishara Jata Jata (1965)
- Deva Tuzhi Sonyachi Jejuri (1967)
- Sangu Kashi Mi (1967)
- Bai Mee Bholi (1967)
- Ek Mati Anek Nati (1968)
- Bai Mothi Bhagyachi (1968)
- Chhand Priticha (1968)
- Manaacha Mujra (1969)
- Ganane Ghungroo Haravale (1970)
- Songadya (1971)
- Pinjra (1972)
- Kalavantin (1978)
- Aaitya Bilavar Nagoba (1979)
- Don Baika Phajeeti Aika (1982)
- Gad Jejuri Jejuri (1985)
- Gaon Tasa Changla Pan Veshila Tangla (1985)
- Bijli (1986)

=== Director ===
- Gad Jejuri Jejuri (1985)

== Bibliography ==
- Sanjit Narwekar; Raghuvir Kul; D. B. Samant (1995). Marathi Cinema: in retrospect. Maharashtra Film, Stage & Cultural Development Corp.
