= Jeelani Bano =

Indian writer of Urdu literature (1936–2026)

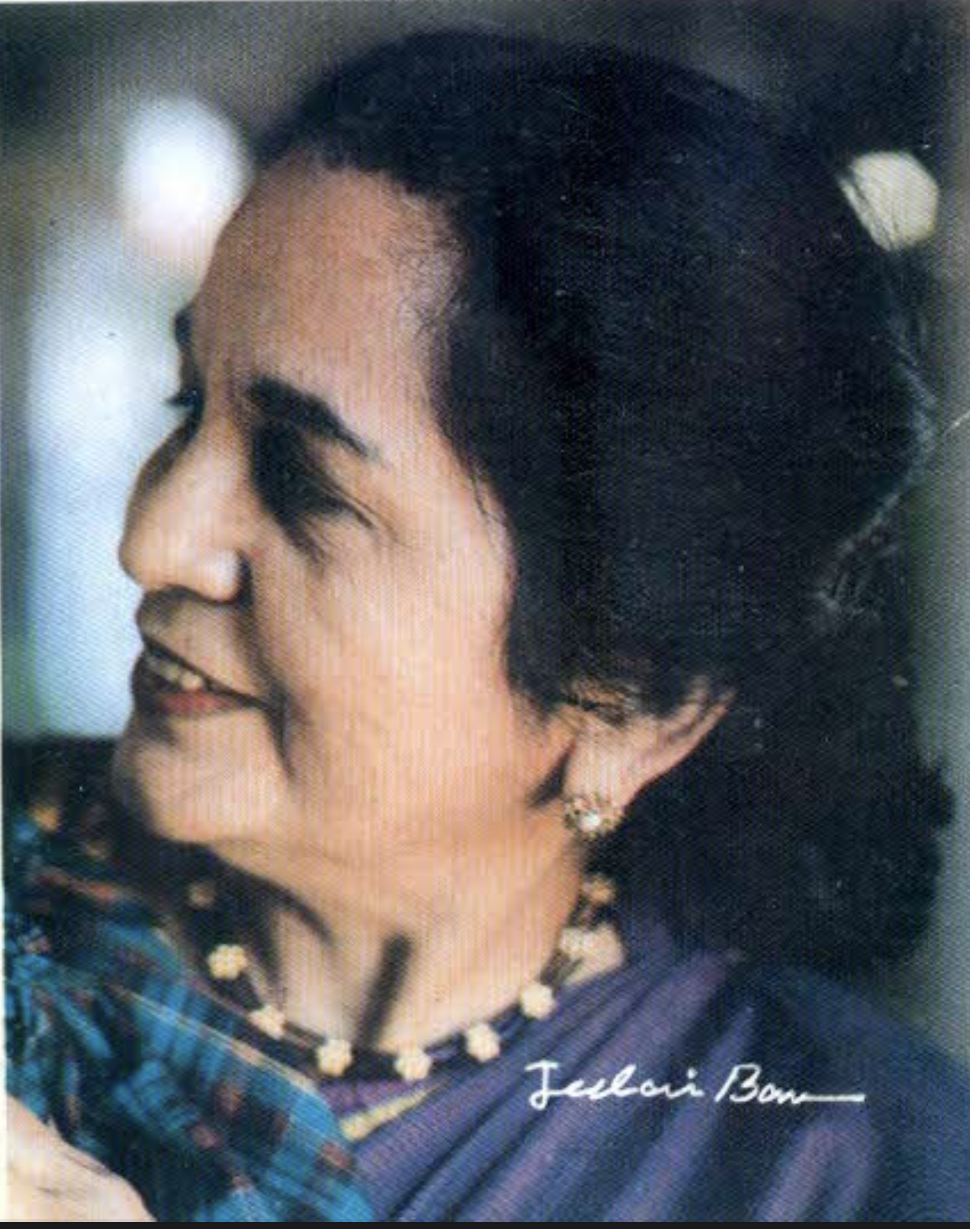
- Bano in 1999
- Born: 14 July 1936; Budaun, United Provinces of Agra and Oudh, British India
- Died: 1 March 2026 (aged 89); Hyderabad, Telangana, India
- Occupations: Litterateur; novelist; author
- Known for: Novel, short story
- Awards: Padma Shri; Andhra Pradesh Sahitya Akademi Award; Soviet Land Nehru Award; Qaumi Haali Award; NTR national Literary Award

Jeelani Bano (14 July 1936 – 1 March 2026) was an Indian writer and novelist. She wrote in Urdu, Hindi, Gujarati and Telugu. Bano received the fourth highest Indian civilian award of Padma Shri in 2001.

== Early life and education ==
Jeelani Bano was born on 14 July 1936 in Badayun, in United Provinces of Agra and Oudh to Hairat Badayuni, a known Urdu poet. After her schooling, she enrolled for intermediate course when she married Anwar Moazzam, a poet of repute and a former head of the Department of Islamic Studies at the Osmania University and shifted to Hyderabad. She continued her education to secure a master's degree (MA) in Urdu.

== Career ==
Bano started writing at an early age, reported to be at the age of eight, and her first story, Ek Nazar Idhar Bhi (A Glance Hither), was published in 1952. She was credited with 22 books comprising anthologies starting with Roshni ke Minar and novels beginning with Aiwaan-e-ghazal. Her list of books includes an autobiography, Afzane and a collection of her correspondence with other writers, Door ki Aawaazen. One of her stories, Narsayya Ki Bavdi, has been made into a 2009 feature film, Well Done Abba by the renowned filmmaker, Shyam Benegal. Many of her books have been translated into other languages.

Jeelani Bano, a former Chairperson of the non governmental organization for women's rights, Asmita, lived in Banjara Hills, Hyderabad. She was also associated with Youth for Action of which she was a former chairperson, Child and Women Human Rights, a forum of the International Human Rights Association of India as its principal advisor and maintains associations with radio and television.

== Death ==
Bano died on 1 March 2026, at the age of 89.

== Awards and recognitions ==
Bano received the Andhra Pradesh Sahitya Akademi Award in 1960, followed by the Soviet Land Nehru Award in 1985.

She received the Qaumi Haali Award from the Haryana Urdu Academy in 1989.

The Government of India honoured her with the civilian award of Padma Shri in 2001.

== Selected works ==
She had been writing since 1954 in Hindi, Urdu, Gujarati and Telugu.

- Bānū, Jīlānī (1958). Raushni Kay Meenār (in Urdu). Naya Adara.
- Bano, Jeelani (1963). Nirvaan (in Urdu). New Delhi: Maktaba Jamia Limited.
- Bānū, Jīlānī (1966). Jugnū aur sitāre (in Urdu). Hind pākiṭ buks.
- Bano, Jeelani (1971). Nirwan (in Urdu). AIlahabad: Shaheen Publishers.
- Bano, Jeelani (1977). Naghme Ka Safar: Chaar Novelette (in Urdu). Hyderabad: Andhra Pradesh Sahitya Academy.
- Bānū, Jīlānī (1976). Aivan-i ghazal (in Urdu). Maktab-i Jam'iah.
- Bano, Jeelani (1979). Paraya Ghar (in Urdu). Hyderabad: Urdu Markaz.
- Bānū, Jīlānī (1987). Pattharoṃ kī bāriśa (in Hindi). Vidyā Prakāśana Mandira.
- Bānū, Jīlānī (1985). Bārish-i sang: nāvil (in Urdu). Dāniyal.
- Bano, Jeelani (1987). Raz ka Qissa (in Urdu). Karachi: Nafees Academy.
- Bano, Jeelani (1992). Ye Kaun Hansa? (in Urdu). Lahore: Khoj.
- Bānū, Jīlānī (1996). A Hail of Stones. Sterling Publishers Pvt. Ltd. ISBN 978-81-207-1837-1.
- Bano, Jeelani (1997). Sach Ke Siwa (in Urdu). Delhi: Educational Publishing House. ISBN 81-86232-47-8.
- Bano, Jeelani (2003). Aiwaan-e-Ghazal (in Urdu). M. R. Publications. ISBN 978-81-88413-00-3.
- Bano, Jeelani (2005). Kun (in Urdu) (1st ed.). Oxford University Press. ISBN 978-0-19-547152-6.
- Bano, Jeelani (2010). Rasta Band Hai (in Urdu) (1st ed.). Delhi: Educational Publishing House. ISBN 978-81-8223-611-0.
- Bano, Jeelani (2012). Rasta Band Hai (in Urdu) (2nd ed.). Delhi: Educational Publishing House. ISBN 978-81-8223-611-0.
- Bano, Jeelani (2014). Mein Kaun Hun? Nau Umri Ke Wo Din (in Urdu) (1st ed.). New Delhi: National Book Trust. ISBN 978-81-237-7219-6.
- Bano, Jeelani (2014). Farrukhi, Asif (ed.). Yaqeen Ke Aage Guman Ke Pichhe (in Urdu). Delhi: Educational Publishing House. ISBN 978-93-5073-436-0.
- Bānū, Jīlānī (2018). Baarish-e-Sang: Novel (in Urdu). Educational Publishing House. ISBN 978-93-88105-42-2.
- Bano, Jeelani (2019). Jilani Bano Ki Do Bal Kahaniyan (in Hindi) (5th ed.). Delhi: National Book Trust.
- Bano, Jeelani (2021). Kimiya-e-Dil (in Urdu). Delhi: Educational Publishing House. ISBN 978-93-91238-31-5.
- Raat ke Musafir (short story anthology)
- Tiryaaq (short story anthology)
- Nayee Aurat (short story anthology)
- Sach ke siva (short story anthology)
- Baat Phoolon ki (short story anthology)
- Dus Pratinidhi Kahaniyan (short story anthology) ISBN 9788189859244
- Addu (short story anthology)

== See also ==
- Urdu literature
- Well Done Abba
