= Jhanjhaar =

- Directed by: V. Shantaram
- Produced by: V. Shantaram
- Starring: Sushant Ray; Padmini Kolhapure; Ranjana Deshmukh; Sudhir Pandey
- Music by: Kalyanji Anandji
- Production company: Rajkamal Kalamandir
- Release date: 1987
- Country: India
- Language: Hindi

Jhanjhaar (Fire) is a 1987 Hindi social drama film directed by V. Shantaram. Made under Rajkamal Kalamandir banner it was a V. Shantaram Productions film. It had music by Kalyanji Anandji. The film starred Sushant Ray (Shantaram's grandson), with Padmini Kolhapure, and the rest of the cast included Yunus Parvez, Sudhir Pandey and Ranjana Deshmukh (niece of Hindi film actress Sandhya who was V. Shantaram's wife). Ranjana's career came to a halt when she met with a car accident on the way to the shooting of this film in Bangalore.

Culminating the end of a career that "spanned" nearly seventy years in Indian cinema, Jhanjhaar was Shantaram's last released film, and a commercial failure at the box-office. Shantaram was 85 years at the time of making Jhanjhaar.

The film is set in a village where a man claiming to be a freedom-fighter takes advantage of the villagers for his own evil purposes. The story then follows the rise of the villagers against him.

== Plot ==
Pushpa and Gayatri are the daughters of an ex-army man, Veer Bahadur, now retired to his village. He fights against the atrocities inflicted by Nagoji, a man pretending to be a freedom fighter. Nagoji uses this as a way of fuelling wrongdoings in the village. When Veer Bahadur opposes Nagoji, he is killed. Bahadur's daughters vow to avenge their father and save the village from Nagoji. They are helped by Nagoji's son, Santosh, who despises the evil ways of his father and more so when Nagoji attempts to molest Pushpa. Gayatri, Pushpa and Santosh together with the help of the villagers manage to bring an end to Nagoji's wicked ways.

== Cast ==
- Sushant Ray as Shantesh
- Padmini Kolhapure as Pushpa
- Ranjana Deshmukh as Gayatri
- Sudhir Pandey as Nagoji
- Aruna Irani as Neeta
- Gulshan Grover as Yeshwant Deshmukh
- Yunus Parvez as Saxena
- Pallavi Joshi as Munni

== Soundtrack ==
The music was composed by Kalyanji–Anandji and released by Sony Music India. All lyrics were penned by Vishwamitra Adil.

Jhanjhaar

Soundtrack album by Kalyanji–Anandji
- Released: 1987
- Recorded: 1987
- Genre: Soundtrack
- Length: 37:58
- Label: Sony Music India
- Producer: Kalyanji–Anandji

Kalyanji–Anandji chronology
Imaandaar (1987)	Jhanjhaar (1987)	Kalyug Aur Ramayan (1987)

Track list
No.	Title	Singer(s)	Length
1.	"Shantu Re"	Suresh Wadkar, Sadhana Sargam	4:20
2.	"Dekho Humse"	Suresh Wadkar, Sadhana Sargam	4:53
3.	"Boli Boli Pinjre Ki"	Sadhana Sargam	5:18
4.	"Dekh Khudara"	Udit Narayan	2:59
5.	"Sun Mera Yaar"	Suresh Wadkar	5:48
6.	"Bada Haath Aage"	Alka Yagnik, Suresh Wadkar	8:01
7.	"Aage Bhi Dushman"	Suresh Wadkar, Sadhana Sargam	2:24
8.	"Dekh Khudara (Excerpt)"	Udit Narayan	1:07
9.	"Dekh Khudara (Sad Version)"	Udit Narayan	2:08
Total length:			37:58
