= Gaon Tasa Changla Pan Veshila Tangla =

- Theatrical release poster
- Directed by: Anant Mane
- Produced by: Chelaram Bhatia; Lalchand Bhatia
- Starring: Usha Naik; Ashok Saraf; Nilu Phule
- Music by: Ram Kadam
- Release date: 21 October 1985
- Country: India
- Language: Marathi

Gaon Tasa Changla Pan Veshila Tangla (transl. The village is good but hanged at the gate gate) is an Indian Marathi-language film directed by Anant Mane and produced by Chelaram Bhatia with Lalchand Bhatia. The film was released on 21 October 1985.

== Cast ==
The cast includes Usha Naik, Ashok Saraf, Nilu Phule & Others.

== Soundtrack ==
The music has been directed by Ram Kadam.

=== Track listing ===
- "Na Kalale Tula Na Kalale Mala" - Anjali Mahulikar, Kishore Bhagwat
- "He Sukhkarta He Dukhharta" - Anuradha Marathe, Anjali Mahulikar
- "Aho Tirshinge Aho Barshinge" - Anuradha Marathe, Kishore Bhagwat
- "Gham Guluni Kaam Karuya" - Anjali Mahulikar, Kishore Bhagwat
- "Ishkacha Madanbaan Sutala" - Anuradha Marathe
- "Mangalmurti Moraya" - Ram Kadam
- "San Varsacha Aala" - Anuradha Marathe, Anjali Mahulikar
- "Gaon Tasa Changala Pan Veshila Tangala Theme" (Instrumental) - N/A
