= Jigarwala =

- Directed by: Swaroop Kumar
- Produced by: Surinder Kaur Jerath
- Starring: Anil Kapoor; Tina Munim
- Music by: Nadeem-Shravan
- Release date: 4 January 1991
- Country: India
- Language: Hindi

Jigarwala is a 1991 Indian Bollywood film directed by Swaroop Kumar and produced by Surinder Kaur Jerath. It stars Tina Munim and Anil Kapoor in pivotal roles. This movie marked the final film appearance of Tina Munim. This movie also has one of the last released songs sung by Kishore Kumar, picturised on Jagdeep.

== Cast ==
- Anil Kapoor as Amar Singh
- Tina Munim as Sohni
- Amrish Puri as Durjan Singh
- Gulshan Grover as Lakhan Singh
- Jagdeep as Shyamu
- Priti Sapru as Tara Singh
- Urmila Bhatt as Sohni's Mother
- Biswajeet as Ranjeet Singh
- Sanjay Jog as Khawali

== Soundtrack ==
Song	Singer
"Badi Mushkil Mein Jaan Hai"	Kishore Kumar
"Nakhre Na Kar"	Amit Kumar
"Hum To Hain Teen Bhai, Sun Le Zara, Koi Nahin in Mein Hai"	Amit Kumar, Asha Bhosle
"Aisa Lagta Tha Yeh Bairi Sawan Chala Jayega Tumhare Bina"	Amit Kumar, Asha Bhosle
"Apne Aashiq Ko Pehchano"	Mohammed Aziz
"Chale Hain Barati Ban Thanke"	Shabbir Kumar, Asha Bhosle
