= Raviraaj =

Indian actor (1942–2020)

- Born: 1942; Mangalore
- Died: 18 March 2020 (aged 77–78); Mumbai, Maharashtra, India
- Occupation: Actor,
- Years active: 1971–1994

Raviraaj (1942 – 18 March 2020) was an Indian actor in Bollywood films. His real name is Ravindra Anant Krishna Rao.

== Career ==
Raviraj worked in Hindi, Marathi as well in Gujarati cinema. He made his debut in the film Aahat. Shura Mi Vandile was his first Marathi movie and Anyaycha Pratikar was his last Marathi movie in which he worked.

== Filmography ==
=== Films ===
- Aahat-Ek Ajib Prem Kahani (1971)
- Shura Mi Vandile (1972)
- Jawai Vikat Ghene Aahe (1973)
- Achanak (1973)
- Ovalite Bhauraya (1975)
- Tuch Mazi Raani (1977)
- Dost Asava Tar Asa (1978)
- Khatta Meetha (1978)
- Jawayachi Jaat (1979)
- Gajarni Pipudi (1979) (Gujarati Movie)
- Roop Pahata Lochani (1980)
- Devapudhe Manus (1980)
- Nanand Bhavjay (1981)
- Je Peed Parai Jane Re (1981) (Gujarati Movie)
- Bhannat Bhanu (1982)
- Ek Chitthi Pyar Bhari (1985)
- Anyayacha Pratikar (1993)
- Chaand Kaa Tukdaa (1994)
- Meghani Raat (-) (Gujarati Movie)
- Tin Chehare (-)
- Ajatashatru (-)
- Shree Krishna (1993) as Sage Garg
