= Laxmichi Paule =

- Theatrical release poster
- Directed by: G. G. Bhosale
- Written by: Arun Chipade
- Screenplay by: G. G. Bhosale
- Produced by: Arun Pandit Chipade
- Starring: Ranjana; Ravindra Mahajani; Suhasini Deshpande; Nilu Phule; Sulochana; Bhalchandra Kulkarni
- Cinematography: S. Gokul
- Edited by: N. S. Vaidya
- Music by: Shridhar Phadke
- Production company: Manisha Chitra
- Release date: 18 February 1982
- Running time: 115 Minutes
- Country: India
- Language: Marathi

Laxmichi Paule (transl. Footsteps of Lakshmi) is a Marathi-language movie released on 18 February 1982. It was produced by Arun Pandit Chipade and directed by G. G. Bhosle.

== Plot ==
Prakash and Nandini share a joyful married life and decide to wait a few years before starting a family. However, as time passes, Nandini becomes increasingly eager to have a child, while Prakash remains hesitant, reminding her of their initial five-year plan. Her longing grows so intense that it begins to affect her well-being, and seeing her distress, Prakash agrees to move forward with having a baby. Nandini soon becomes pregnant, filling the family with excitement, though Prakash and his mother secretly harbor concerns.

As Nandini nears the end of her pregnancy, she overhears a conversation between her mother-in-law and Prakash's friend Sudama, revealing a long-kept family secret—a curse that claims the father's life if a son is born. Fearful for Prakash's safety, Nandini considers drastic measures to prevent the birth, but by then, it's too late. All they can do is wait and see how fate will unfold.

== Cast ==
- Ranjana as Nandini
- Ravindra Mahajani as Prakash
- Nilu Phule as Sudama Pawar
- Sulochana as Prakash's mother
- Suhasini Deshpande as Sarla Pawar
- Jyoti Chandekar as Shaila
- Bhalchandra Kulkarni as Annasaheb
- Shanta Tambe as Saraswati
- Charusheela Sable
- Karve Guruji

== Soundtrack ==
The music is provided by Shridhar Phadke and lyrics were written by Sudhir Moghe. Asha Bhosle, Suresh Wadkar, Sudhir Phadke and Ranjana Joglekar provided vocals.

=== Track listing ===
No.	Title	Performer(s)	Length
1.	"Latkyachi Tanhulyachi"	Asha Bhosle	3:05
2.	"Prite Andharache Jaale"	Asha Bhosle, Sudhir Phadke	6:12
3.	"Je Hote Have"	Asha Bhosle	3:10
4.	"Majhya Punyaeeche Bal (Female Vocals)"	Asha Bhosle	3:06
5.	"Natha Tujhi Mee Jahale"	Asha Bhosle	3:17
6.	"Jya Anubhootichya Sparshane"	Suresh Wadkar, Ranjana Joglekar	3:19
7.	"Majhya Punyaeeche Bal (Male Vocals)"	Asha Bhosle	2:33
8.	"Prite Andharache Jaale"	Sudhir Phadke	6:17
