= Aaram Haram Aahe =

- Theatrical release poster
- Directed by: Kamlakar Torne
- Produced by: Kamlakar Torne
- Starring: Ravindra Mahajani; Roohi; Sharad Talwalkar; Ganesh Solanki
- Music by: Sudhir Phadke
- Release date: 26 October 1976
- Country: India
- Language: Marathi

Aaram Haram Aahe is a Marathi movie released on 26 October 1976. The movie was produced by Prem Chitra and directed by Kamlakar Torne. Film Stars Ravindra Mahajani, Roohi and Padma Chavan in Lead Roles. The film received critical and commercial success. The film won Filmfare Award for Best Film.

== Plot ==
Sudha Godbole (Roohi), a young woman from a modest background in Bombay, lives with her widowed mother and works as a secretary to support the household. She falls in love with Suresh Vichare (Ravindra Mahajani), a hardworking motor mechanic employed at a local garage. Despite their limited income, the couple dreams of building a happy future together and even begins saving money for their married life.

Their lives take an unexpected turn when Suresh suddenly disappears. Around the same time, cash and jewellery go missing from Sudha’s house, including the money Suresh had entrusted to her. As suspicion grows, Sudha teams up with Suresh’s close friend Sudam (Suresh Bhagwat) to search for him. Their investigation reveals that Suresh has also vanished from his workplace after allegedly driving away with a customer’s luxury car.

The search eventually leads them near Bangalore, where they are shocked to discover Suresh living under a new identity as wealthy businessman Mahesh Kuber. Surrounded by luxury and accompanied by an elegant woman named Padma (Padma Chavan), he appears to have completely abandoned his old life. What follows is an emotional journey that uncovers betrayal, hidden truths, and the consequences of chasing a different destiny.

== Cast ==
- Ravindra Mahajani as Mahesh Kuber/Suresh Vichare
- Roohi as Sudha Godbole
- Padma Chavan as Padma (Pammi)
- Sharad Talwalkar as Potbhare
- Dhumal as Jaage
- Ganesh Solanki as Chaufer
- Suresh Bhagwat as Sudam
- Prakash Inamdar

== Soundtrack ==
The music has been directed by Sudhir Phadke.

=== Track listing ===
No.	Title	Length
1.	"Asel Kuthe Rutala Kaata Mazya Talpaayat"	4:47
2.	"Premvedi Raadha Saad Ghaali Mukunda"	5:11
3.	"Aakashi Zhep Ghe Re Paakhara"	3:43
4.	"Jaashil Kuthe Muli Tu"	4:44
