= Anolkhi =

- Theatrical release poster
- Directed by: Kamalakar Torne
- Written by: Madhusudan Kalelkar
- Produced by: Kamalakar Torne
- Starring: Padma Chavan; Shrikant Moghe; Vikram Gokhale; Sharad Talwalkar; Mast. Alankar
- Cinematography: Ratnakar Laad
- Edited by: V. K. Naik
- Music by: Sudhir Phadke
- Production company: Avinash Pictures
- Release date: 17 March 1973
- Country: India
- Language: Marathi

Anolkhi is a Marathi movie released on 17 March 1973. The movie was produced and directed by Kamalakar Torne.

== Cast ==
- Padma Chavan as Kavita
- Shrikant Moghe
- Vikram Gokhale as Ashok
- Sharad Talwalkar
- Mast. Alankar as Raju

== Soundtrack ==
The music has been directed by Sudhir Phadke.

1. "Dhund Ekant Ha"- Asha Bhosle
2. "Amachya Raju Ka Rusla"- Asha Bhosle, Sudhir Phadke
