= Aamhi Dogha Raja Rani =

1986 film directed by Kamlakar Torne

Amhi Doghe Raja Rani
- Theatrical release poster
- Directed by: Kamlakar Torne
- Written by: Prabhakar Tamne
- Produced by: Prem Chitra
- Starring: Laxmikant Berde; Tejashri; Sharad Talwalkar; Atmaram Bhende; Vijay Kadam; Sanjay Jog; Suhasini Deshpande; Indu Navalkar; Archana Pandare
- Music by: Raamlaxman
- Production company: Everest Entertainment Pvt. Ltd.
- Release date: 31 December 1986
- Country: India
- Language: Marathi

Amhi Doghe Raja Rani (transl. We are both kings and queens) is a 1986 Indian Marathi-language comedy-drama film directed by Kamlakar Torne and written by Prabhakar Tamne. It was released on 31 December 1986.

== Cast ==
- Laxmikant Berde as Raja Joshi
- Tejashri as Madhurani O. Thakur
- Sharad Talwalkar as Omkar Thakur
- Atmaram Bhende as Joshi
- Vijay Kadam as Balya
- Sanjay Jog as Dr. Satish Shah
- Suhasini Deshpande as Mrs. Joshi
- Indu Navalkar as Balya's mother
- Archana Pandare as Balya's wife

== Soundtrack ==
The music has been directed by Ram Laxman.

=== Track listing ===
No.	Title	Length
1.	"Mi Premnagarcha Raja song"	5:56
2.	"Youvanane Ang Phule song"	5:30
3.	"Kombdyano Vichar Kara song"	6:01
4.	"Ye Re Ye Re Pavasa song"	5:41
