= Gupchup Gupchup =

- Directed by: V. K. Naik
- Screenplay by: Madhusudan Kalelkar
- Story by: Madhusudan Kalelkar
- Produced by: Kishor Miskin
- Starring: Ashok Saraf; Ranjana; Kuldeep Pawar; Mahesh Kothare; Padma Chavan; Shubhangi Rawate; Shriram Lagoo
- Cinematography: Suryakant Lavande
- Edited by: Sanjeev Naik
- Music by: Anil-Arun
- Production company: Shivshakti Productions
- Release date: 22 December 1983
- Country: India
- Language: Marathi

Gupchup Gupchup (transl. Stealthily, on the sly) is a Marathi-language romantic comedy film was released on 22 December 1983. It was directed by V. K. Naik and produced by Kishor Miskin under the banner of Shivshakti Productions. It stars Ashok Saraf, Ranjana Deshmukh, Kuldeep Pawar, Mahesh Kothare, Shubhangi Rawate, Padma Chavan, Shriram Lagoo in main roles.

== Plot ==
Two sisters, Hema and Shyama, live a restricted life with their wealthy and controlling father, Sir Saheb. He even hires the very strict Madam Jawalkar as their governess. Shyama defies her father's wishes by falling for Ashok, but Sir Saheb insists on marrying her off to Atul. Tired of their antics, Sir Saheb sends them both to Goa for further studies.

Shyama elopes with and marries Ashok. Meanwhile, during her travel, Hema meets radio singer Suresh Kumar without recognizing him.

Upon reaching Goa, Hema pulls a hilarious stunt. She pretends to be twins - both herself and the runaway Shyama - to fool their aunt. The story gets even more comedic with Professor Dhond, a clumsy character who gets smitten by Hema and ends up being the butt of many jokes.

== Cast ==
- Ashok Saraf as Professor Dhond
- Ranjana as Hema
- Shubhangi Rawate as Shyama
- Kuldeep Pawar as Suresh Kumar
- Mahesh Kothare as Ashok
- Shriram Lagoo as Sir Saheb
- Padma Chavan as Madam Jawalkar
- Guddi Maruti as Rosa
- Sharad Talwalkar as Mr. Dongre
- Ashalata as Aunty
- Meenakshi Martins as Hema's classmate
- Suresh Bhagwat as Atul
- Arun Sarnaik as Bhausaheb

== Soundtrack ==
The music has been directed by Anil-Arun and lyrics were written by Madhusudan Kalelkar, Shantaram Nandgaonkar and Umakant Kanekar.

=== Track listing ===
- "Gupchup Gupchup" (Lyricist(s): Madhusudan Kalelkar) – Suresh Wadkar, Asha Bhosle
- "Pahile Na Mi Tula" – Suresh Wadkar
- "Sang Mi Tujla Kay Deu" – Anuradha Paudwal, Vinay Mandke
- "Ye Na Jawal Ghena" – Sudesh Bhosle

== Accolades ==
Year	Award	Category	Nominee	Result	Ref.
1984	Maharashtra State Film Awards	Best Second Film	Gupchup Gupchup	Won	
1984	Maharashtra State Film Awards	Best Actress	Ranjana	Won	
1984	Maharashtra State Film Awards	Best Director	V. K. Naik	Won	
1984	Filmfare Awards Marathi	Filmfare Award for Best Film — Marathi	Gupchup Gupchup	Won	
1984	Filmfare Awards Marathi	Best Director	V. K. Naik	Won	
