= Sanjay Jog =

Indian actor (1955–1995)

- Born: 24 September 1955; Nagpur, Bombay State, India
- Died: 27 November 1995 (aged 40); Mumbai, Maharashtra, India
- Years active: 1975–1995
- Spouse: Neeta Jog (m. 1979–1995)
- Children: 2

Sanjay Jog (24 September 1955– 27 November 1995) was an Indian Marathi language film actor who appeared in Marathi, Gujarati and Hindi films and television series. Known for his performance in Ramanand Sagar's Ramayan and Luv Kush, Jog started his career with Marathi film Sapla in 1975.

== Early and personal life ==
Jog was born on 24 September 1955 in Nagpur, Maharashtra. He was a farmer before started his career as an actor. He was married to Neeta Jog in 1979. He had two children, including Ranjeet Jog.

== Career ==
Jog's first movie Sapla released in 1975 but it didn't do well, so he went back to Nagpur and started farming. During a work trip to Mumbai, he got offered a lead role in the Marathi film Zidd, which turned out to be a hit. This success led to a flourishing career with around 30 Marathi films and some work in Gujarati films.

Jog started his Bollywood journey with Apna Ghar and went on to act in films like Jigarwala, Humshakal, Naseebwala, and Beta Ho To Aisa. His last film was Beta Ho To Aisa released in 1994. Jog also made a mark on TV with his debut in Ramanand Sagar's Ramayan, gaining popularity for his role as Bharat.

== Filmography ==
=== Films ===
Year	Title	Role	Language	Notes
1975	Sapla	Unnamed	Marathi	Uncredited
1980	Zidd	Bansi	Marathi	Film debut
1981	Gondhalat Gondhal	Vinayak	Marathi	Parallel lead
1982	Aavhan	Sanju	Marathi	Parallel lead
1982	Mai Baap	Ravi Patil	Marathi	Parallel lead
1982	Diste Tase Naste	Inspector Anand	Marathi	Parallel lead
1982	Savitrichi Suun	Ravi	Marathi	Parallel lead
1984	Sage Soyare	Rajesh	Marathi	Parallel lead
1984	Maya Bazar	Abhimanyu	Gujarati	Lead role
1984	Navri Mile Navryala	Ramesh Deshmukh	Marathi	Lead role
1986	Aamhi Dogha Raja Rani	Dr. Satish Shah	Marathi	
1989	Apna Ghar	Sanjay	Hindi	Supporting role
1991	Jigarwala	Khawali	Hindi	Supporting role
1992	Humshakal		Hindi	Supporting role
1992	Insaan Bana Shaitan	Ravi	Hindi	Supporting role
1992	Naseebwala	Ram	Hindi	Supporting role
1994	Beta Ho To Aisa	Inspector Suraj	Hindi	Supporting role

=== Television ===
Year	Title	Role	Language	Ref.
1987–1988	Ramayan	Bharat	Hindi	
1988–1989	Luv Kush	Bharat	Hindi	

== Death ==
Jog died in Mumbai on 27 November 1995 due to liver ailment.
