= Mumbaicha Faujdar =

- Theatrical release poster
- Directed by: Rajdutt
- Screenplay by: Vasant Sabnis
- Story by: Anil Barve
- Produced by: Manohar Randive
- Starring: Ravindra Mahajani; Ranjana
- Cinematography: Ishan Arya
- Edited by: N. S. Vaidya
- Music by: Vishwanath More
- Production company: Manohari Chitra
- Release date: 1984
- Running time: 112 minutes
- Country: India
- Language: Marathi

Mumbaicha Faujdar (transl. Policeman from Mumbai) is a 1984 Indian Marathi-language romantic comedy film directed by Rajdutt and produced by Manohar Randive under the banner of Manohari Chitra. It was written by Anil Barve from a screenplay by Vasant Sabnis, and it stars Ravindra Mahajani and Ranjana in the lead roles.

== Plot ==
Patil (Raghuvendra Kadkol) dreams of seeing his daughter Sakhu (Ranjana) married to a respectable and well-groomed police officer. His hopes rise when Jaisingh Rao Mohite (Ravindra Mahajani), a smart and dedicated officer serving in the Mumbai Police, visits their village. Impressed by Jaisingh’s personality and disciplined nature, Patil believes he would be the perfect match for Sakhu.

However, Jaisingh is already in love with Madhuri (Priya Tendulkar), a young journalist from the city. During his visit home, he is taken aback to learn that his family has almost finalised his marriage with Sakhu without his consent. Coming from a simple village background, Sakhu’s innocence and lack of education make it difficult for Jaisingh to accept her initially. Despite this, Sakhu wholeheartedly tries to win him over, leading to a heartwarming journey filled with misunderstandings, emotions, and an evolving bond between two completely different worlds.

== Cast ==
- Ravindra Mahajani as Jaisingh Rao Mohite
- Ranjana as Sakhu
- Priya Tendulkar as Madhuri Yadav
- Raghuvendra Kadkol as Patil, Saku's father
- Jairam Kulkarni as Mama
- Sharad Talwalkar as Constable Ghondale
- Shanta Inamdar as Ambabai Ghondale
- Roohi Berde as Anu

== Production ==
The film was shot in Kolhapur, Maharashtra.

== Soundtrack ==
Mumbaicha Faujdar

Soundtrack album by Vishwanath More
- Released: 1985
- Genre: Feature film soundtrack
- Language: Marathi

The music was composed by Vishwanath More and the lyrics were Written by Jagdish Khebudkar. Films music was big success.

No.	Title	Lyrics	Singer(s)	Length
1.	"Ha Sagari Kinara Ola Sugandha Vara"	Jagdish Khebudkar	Anuradha Paudwal, Suresh Wadkar
2.	"Sahjivnat Aali Hi Swapnasundari"	Jagdish Khebudkar	Suresh Wadkar
3.	"Satanavsana Mala Milala Jivacha Jodidar"	Jagdish Khebudkar	Anuradha Paudwal
4.	"Mini Mini Mini Mini Merry Go Round"	Jagdish Khebudkar	Anuradha Paudwal
