= Bin Kamacha Navra =

- Film poster
- Directed by: Murliddhar Kapdi
- Written by: Vasant Sabnis
- Produced by: Kishor Miskin
- Starring: Ashok Saraf; Ranjana; Kuldeep Pawar; Madhu Kambikar; Ravi Patwardhan; Nilu Phule
- Cinematography: Suryakant Lavande
- Edited by: Bhai Khot; Vyankatesh Naik
- Music by: Rajendra Vinay
- Production company: Shivshakti Productions
- Release date: 6 December 1984
- Running time: 136 minutes
- Country: India
- Language: Marathi

Bin Kamacha Navra (transl. Idle Husband) is a 1984 Indian Marathi comedy drama film directed by Murlidhar Kapdi and written by Vasant Sabnis. The film stars Ashok Saraf, Ranjana Deshmukh, Kuldeep Pawar, Ravi Patwardhan, Nilu Phule, and Madhu Kambikar in the pivotal roles. In the history of Marathi cinema, "Bin Kamacha Navra" is still regarded as a cult film that fans still find moving and nostalgic.

== Plot ==
Three indolent buddies named Tukya, Namya, and Nivrutti desire to use short cuts to acquire quick money and waste their time at odd jobs for politician Sahebrao. They will stop at nothing to see Tamasha's of Sundra; it's their only interest. When they decide to run for office with Sahebrao's assistance, their spouses have had enough and are fed up with them because they are never willing to change. To impart a lesson to them, their wives choose to stand in opposition to them.

== Cast ==
- Ashok Saraf as Tukaram "Tukya"
- Ranjana Deshmukh as Drupada
- Kuldeep Pawar as Namdev "Namya"
- Madhu Kambikar as Laxmi
- Ravi Patwardhan as Dada, Laxmi's father
- Nilu Phule as Sahebrao
- Dinkar Inamdar as Ukde Vakil
- Asha Patil as Sundra
- Prakash Inamdar as Nivrutti

== Production ==
The filming was done at Jayprabha Studio in Kolhapur.

== Soundtrack ==
Bin Kamacha Navra

Soundtrack album by Rajendra Vinay
- Released: 1984
- Genre: Feature film soundtrack
- Length: 24:41
- Language: Marathi
- Label: Saregama India Limited

Official audio
- Bin Kamacha Navra - Full Album on YouTube

The music is composed by Rajendra Vinay, and the sound recording is by Raghuveer Date at His Master's Voice, Mumbai. The songs are written by Shantaram Nandgaonkar and sung by Asha Bhosle, Suresh Wadkar, Uttara Kelkar, Anuradha Paudwal, and Usha Mangeshkar.

=== Track listing ===
No.	Title	Singer(s)
1	"Jhunjur Munjur"	Asha Bhosle
2	"Vajeev Raja"	Suresh Wadkar, Uttara Kelkar
3	"Ag Ag Mhashi"	Suresh Wadkar, Uttara Kelkar
4	"Ain Dupari Aad Vaten Chorun"	Usha Mangeshkar
5	"Sakha Angashi Majhya Jhatala"	Anuradha Paudwal
