= Jyotibacha Navas =

Jyotibacha Navas - Marathi Movie
- Theatrical release poster
- Directed by: Kamlakar Torne
- Screenplay by: Dinkar D. Patil
- Story by: Baba Kadam
- Produced by: M.S.Salvi
- Starring: Suryakant; Vikram Gokhale; Madhukar Toradmal; Padma Chavan; Asha Kale
- Cinematography: Ratnakar Laad
- Edited by: Bhanudaas Divkar
- Music by: Sudhir Phadke
- Production company: Amar productions
- Release date: 15 April 1975
- Running time: 150 min.
- Country: India
- Language: Marathi

Jyotibacha Navas is a Marathi movie released on 15 April 1975. It was produced by M.S. Salvi and directed by Kamlakar Torne. it stars Suryakant, Vikram Gokhale, Madhukar Toradmal, Padma Chavan and Asha Kale. The film ran for 23 week in Kolhapur. It was the first film of Madhukar Toradmal.

== Cast ==
The cast includes:

- Suryakant as Sarjerao
- Vikram Gokhale as Arun
- Madhukar Toradmal as DSP Salvi
- Padma Chavan as Padmaja
- Rajshekar as Balasaheb
- Asha Kale as Renu
- Bhalchandra Kulkarni
- Dhumal
- Vatsala Deshmukh
- Ramchandra Varde
- Dinkar Inamdar
- Rajnibala
- Sanjivani Bidkar
- Saroj Sukhatankar
- Bal Salvi

== Plot ==
DSP Salvi is transferred to Kolhapur where the region is terrorized by a Dacoait Sarjya he swears in the temple to get hold of him. Sarjya once lived a simple life but after his father died when Balasaheb to over his land he went to fight back with him in the process Guruji accidentally died after being hit by a bullet his dream was to build a school for village kids. Sarjya then decides to full fill his dream and loots the rich to get funds to build the school. Padmaja daughter of Salvi gets inspired by his deed as he feels he is not a criminal she meets Sarjya and both get married and Dalvi swears in the temple that he will return to the temple once he puts bullet in Sarja's body.

== Production ==
Film's Shooting has been done at Ranjeet Studio Mumbai, Jayprabha Studio Kolhapur and Shantakiran Studio Kolhapur.

== Soundtrack ==
Jyotibacha Navas

Soundtrack album by Sudhir Phadke
- Recorded: H. M. V. Record Company Mumbai
- Genre: Soundtrack
- Length: 30:08

The music is provided by Sudhir Phadke. All the songs were choreographed by sohanlal. Vocals were provided by Usha Mangeshkar, Sudhir Phadke, Pushpa Pagdhare, Jaywant Kulkarni and Krishna Kalle. lyrics by Jagdish Khebudkar.

=== Track listing ===
No.	Title	Performer(s)	Length
1.	"Dan Dilyane Dyan Vadhate"	Sudhir Phadke	3:34
2.	"Ya Pavnyala Laajach Nhai"	Pushpa Pagdhare	3:51
3.	"Hi duniya Hay ek Jatra"	Jaywant Kulkarni	6:26
4.	"Kalpanecha Kunchala"	Usha Mangeshkar	3:58
5.	"Kuni Sobtila Majhya Rahva"	Usha Mangeshkar	4:51
6.	"Phoola Sapnala Ali Ga"	Usha Mangeshkar krushna kalle	3:05
7.	"Ghodyala Ghala Lagaam"	Usha Mangeshkar	4:47
