= Ranjana Deshmukh =

Indian actress (1952–2000)

Ranjana
- Born: 23 July 1952; Mumbai, India
- Died: 3 March 2000 (aged 47); Parel, Mumbai, India
- Years active: 1975–1987
- Mother: Vatsala Deshmukh
- Relatives: Sandhya Shantaram (maternal aunt)

Ranjana Deshmukh (23 July 1952 – 3 March 2000) was an Indian actress known for her work in several popular Marathi films productions in 1970s & '80s. Ranjana was one of the leading stars of Marathi cinema industry during the late 70s through 80s. She was known for her great comic time and her versatility as an actress. She won Filmfare Marathi for Best Actress and Maharashtra State Film Award for Best Actress for two times each.

== Early life ==
Ranjana was born on 23 July 1952 in Mumbai. She came from a family with a strong background in the performing arts; her father, Govardhan, was a well-known figure on the Gujarati stage, often referred to as the "Bal Gandharva" of that medium and her mother was a Marathi actress Vatsala Deshmukh. Following her parents' divorce, Ranjana and her younger brother moved in with their maternal aunt, the noted actress Sandhya Shantaram.

Ranjana attended Parel English School for her primary and secondary education. Although she grew up surrounded by the film industry, her mother initially opposed the idea of her daughter pursuing an acting career. Respecting her mother's wishes, Ranjana focused on her studies and earned a degree in Philosophy and Literature from Ramnarain Ruia College. During this time, she also completed several vocational courses at the Davar Institute, including secretarial practice, beauty culture, baking, and catering.

Her first experience in front of the camera happened as a child artist. At the age of five, she appeared in the film Harishchandra Taramati, followed by a role in the bilingual film Ladki Sahyadri Ki. Despite these early appearances, she did not intend to become a full-time actress as an adult. Her professional career began unexpectedly when filmmaker V. Shantaram offered her a role in the 1975 film Chandanachi Choli Ang Ang Jali. She accepted the role, marking the formal start of her career as a leading lady in Marathi cinema.

== Career ==
She is the daughter of Vatsala Deshmukh. Her aunt, Sandhya was married to V. Shantaram, who introduced her to the screen in Superhit Movie Chandanachi Choli Ang Ang Jaali (1975), Where she played supporting role. She then starred in the lead role in Shantaram's next film, Zunj. opposite Ravindra Mahajani. Ranjana won the state government award for best actress twice : Are Sansar Sansar (1980) and Gupchup Gupchup (1983). Her other key films include Sushila (1979), Gondhalat Gondhal (1981), Mumbaicha Faujdar (1985), Bin Kamacha Navra (1984), Khichdi (1985), Chaani (1978), Zakhmi Waghin, Bhujang (1982) and Ek Daav Bhutacha (1982).

Ranjana made hit pairs at the box office with several noted Marathi film actors including Ashok Saraf, Avinash Masurekar, Shreeram Lagoo, Kuldeep Pawar, Nilu Phule, Ravindra Mahajani, Raja Gosavi and others. Ranjana Deshmukh's career came to an abrupt end in 1987 in a car accident while she was on her way to Bangalore to shoot for Jhanjhaar. Ranjana's legs were paralysed in the accident. She was engaged to Ashok Saraf earlier. After her accident she was in a play named Fakt Ekdaach.

== Filmography ==
Year	Title	Role	Notes
1965	Kela Ishara Jata Jata	Unnamed	Child actor
1966	Ladki Sahyadri Ki	Young Rani	Child actor
1975	Chandanachi Choli Ang Ang Jali	Gaura's daughter	Supporting role
1975	Zunj	Kamala Kolhapure	Lead debut
1977	Asla Navra Nako Ga Bai!	Shalan	
1977	Chaani	Chaani	
1978	Kalavantin	Deepa	
1978	Sushila	Sushila	
1978	Sasurvasheen	Durga Mane	
1979	Duniya Kari Salaam	Padma	
1979	Haldikunku	Vidya	
1979	Jai Mahakali	Ranjana	
1980	Bhalu	Sumitra	
1980	Sulavarchi Poli	Jenny	
1981	Nagin	Nagin	
1981	Gondhalat Gondhal	Mangala	
1981	Are Sansar Sansar	Ratna Desai	
1981	Devghar	Ranjana	
1981	Patalin	Kiri Inamdar/Parvati	
1982	Laxmichi Paule	Nandini	
1982	Bhujang	Zana/Zanai	
1982	Galli Te Dilli	Taramati	
1982	Ek Daav Bhutacha	Nakubala	
1983	Navratri	Ranjana	Bhojpuri film
1983	Kashala Udyachi Baat	Chanda	
1983	Baiko Asavi Ashi	Laxmi	
1983	Savitri	Savitri	
1983	Gupchup Gupchup	Hema/Shyama	
1983	Sasu Varchad Javai	Mogra Teli	
1983	He Daan Kunkwache	Chandra	
1983	Mardani	Anu .R. Desai	
1984	Aali Lahar Kela Kahar	Bhakti Deshmukh/Padmaja Pathak	
1984	Bin Kamacha Navra	Draupada	
1984	Sage Soyare	Sumitra	
1984	Kulswamini Ambabai	Jaya Akka	
1984	Mumbaicha Faujdar	Saku	
1984	Bahuroopi	Vassu	
1984	Zakhmi Waghin	Bhanu Bane	
1985	Khichdi	Shanti	
1986	Jhanjhaar	Gayatri	Last film

== Death ==
Ranjana died of a heart attack at her residence at Parel in central Mumbai, India. She was 45. She is survived by her mother Vatsala Deshmukh, a noted character actress of her time and her aunt Sandhya, Hindi film actress and wife of V. Shantaram.

Zee Talkies paid tribute to Ranjana by showcasing her select movies on 3 March 2011. The government of Maharashtra has instituted an award in her memory.

== Accolades ==
Year	Award	Category	Film	Result
1979	Filmfare Awards Marathi	Best Actress	Sushila	Won
1979	Maharashtra State Film Awards	Best Actress	Are Sansar Sansar	Won
1983	Filmfare Awards Marathi	Best Actress	Savitri	Won
1983	Maharashtra State Film Awards	Best Actress	Gupchup Gupchup	Won

== See also ==
- Marathi cinema
