= Kuldeep Pawar =

Indian actor

- Born: 10 June 1949; Kolhapur, Bombay State, India
- Died: March 24, 2014 (aged 64); Mumbai, Maharashtra, India
- Other name: KP
- Occupations: Actor; Producer
- Spouse: Nilima
- Children: Aishwarya; Samrudha
- Parents: Vasantrao A Pawar (father); Shantadevi (mother)

Kuldeep Pawar (10 June 1949 – 24 March 2014) was an Indian actor in the Marathi language film industry of India.

== Early life ==
He was born in Kolhapur in Maharashtra. His grandfather worked for electric power house started by His Highness Shahu Maharaj and his father acted in small roles in Marathi films. Kuldeep studied in St.Xavier school and Rajaram College in Kolhapur.

== Career ==
He moved to Mumbai where he was given chance by Marathi drama director Prabhakar Panshikar to act in Marathi drama Ethe Oshalala Mrutyu as character of Sambhaji Maharaj. His key films include Jhaatyache Jaale, Darodekhor, Bin Kamacha Navra, Shapit, Are Sansar Sansar, Sarja, Eka Peksha Ek, Vajir, Gupchup Gupchup, Vedh and Shrinath Mhaskobacha Changabhala. He also acted in famous TV serial "Tu Tu Main Main" directed by Sachin, and Paramveer.

A versatile actor, Pawar was one of the few actors who managed a perfect balance between comic and negative roles in Marathi theatre, films and tele serials. Kuldeep had worked in a play titled 'Rakheli' in which he had played a character called 'Daddy'. Since then the industry people address him by the same name.

== Filmography ==
- Anolkhi (1973)
- Kalavantin (1978)
- Javyachi jaat (1979)
- Darodekhor (1980)
- Aai (1981)
- Totaya aamdar (1981)
- Are sansar sansar (1981)
- Shapit (1982)
- Navre sagle gadhav (1982)
- Mardani (1983)
- Kashala udyachi baat (1983)
- Gupchup Gupchup (1983)
- Savitri (1983)
- Aali Laher Kela Kahar (1984)
- Gosht Dhamal Namyachi (1984)
- Bin Kamacha Navra (1984)
- Gulchadi (1984)
- Dhagala lagli kal (1984)
- Ardhangi (1985)
- Aai Tuljabhavani (1986)
- Khara warasdar (1986)
- Sarja (1987)
- Gauracha navra (1988)
- Doodh Ka Karz (1990)
- Eka peksha ek (1990)
- Doctor doctor (1991)
- Julum (1991)
- Yeda Ki Khula (1991) as Krishnakant(KK)
- Amrutvel (1992)
- Jeet (1996)
- Vazir (1994)
- Aali laxmi sasarla (1998)
- Ghe bharari (1999)
- Sattadhish (2000)
- Maratha bataliyan (2002)
- Nishkalank (2003)
- Supari (2003)
- Zunj ekaki (2004)
- Navra Maza Navsacha (2004)
- Devashappath khot sangen (2006)
- Sasarchi ka maherchi (2006)
- Nana mama (2006)
- Jakhmi police (2006)
- Arre... Devaa (2007)
- Ghaat pratighaat (2007)
- Aaicha gondhal (2007)
- Gulabrao Zavade (2010)
- Jau Tithe Khau(2007)
- Mumbaicha Dabewala (2007)
- Durga manhtyat mala (2011)
- Bhartiya (2012) - lade patil
- Fakt saatvi paas (2012)
- Sasubai gelya chorila (2013)
- Kuni ghar det ka ghar (2013)

== Dramas ==
- Rakheli
- Pati Sagale Uchapati
- Ithe Oshadla Mrityu (Sambhaji)
- Viz Mhanali Dhartil (Tatya Tope)
- Ashrunchi Zaale Fule (Shambhu Mahadev)
- Asaahi Ek Aurangzeb (Aurangzeb)

== Television Serials ==
- Paramveer
- Damini
- Tu Tu Main Main
- Sansaar
- Aakrosh

== Personal life ==
He is survived by his two children and wife Nilima, also a theatre person.

== Death ==
He died on 24 March 2014 due to kidney failure in Kokilaben Dhirubhai Ambani Hospital at Mumbai.
