= Maharashtra State Film Award for Best Actress =

Indian film award

- Native name: Smita Patil Award for Best Actress
- Awarded for: Best performance by an actress in a leading role in a Marathi film
- Sponsored by: Ministry of Cultural Affairs (Maharashtra)
- Reward: ₹100,000 (US$1,100)
- First award: 1962
- Final award: 2024

Highlights
- Most awards: Jayshree Gadkar (4)
- Total awarded: 62
- First winner: Sulochana Latkar, Prapanch (1962)

The Maharashtra State Film Award for Best Actress is an honour presented annually at the Maharashtra State Film Awards to recognize an actress for the best performance in a leading role in a Marathi film. Established in 1962, the recipients are selected by a jury constituted each year by the Government of Maharashtra. They are announced by the Minister for Cultural Affairs and presented by the Chief Minister of Maharashtra. Over the course of 62 award ceremonies, accounting for ties and repeat winners, the award has been presented to 44 different actresses. The award was later renamed the Smita Patil Award for Best Actress, in honour of Smita Patil, one of the most celebrated actress of Indian and Marathi cinema. Recipients receive a statuette and a cash prize of ₹1 lakh (US$1,100).

== Achievement records ==
=== Multiple wins ===
Individuals with two or more Best Actress awards:

Wins	Actress
4	Jayshree Gadkar; Sonali Kulkarni
3	Mukta Barve
2	Surekha; Asha Kale; Usha Chavan; Ranjana Deshmukh; Madhu Kambikar; Alka Kubal; Varsha Usgaonkar; Aishwarya Narkar; Ashwini Bhave; Priya Bapat

=== Other achievement records ===
Achievement	Actor	Record
Most consecutive wins	Jayshree Gadkar (1966–1968)	3
Eldest winner	Suhas Joshi (1998)	age 51
Youngest winner	Rajeshwari Sachdev (1991)	age 16

- Jayshree Gadkar holds the record for the most consecutive Best Actress wins, receiving the award for three successive years from 1966 to 1968. She is followed by Usha Chavan (1979–1980), Alka Kubal (1985–1986), and Sonali Kulkarni (1994–1995), each of whom won the award in two consecutive years.
- The award has been shared only once in its history. At the 2022 ceremony, Amruta Khanvilkar won for Chandramukhi, while Sai Tamhankar received the honour for Pondicherry.
- Sonali Kulkarni is the only actress to have won the Best Actress award across three different decades, with victories in the 1990s (twice), 2000s, and 2020s.
- Sulochana Latkar became the first actress to win awards in both the Best Actress and Best Supporting Actress categories. Other actresses to have achieved this distinction include Surekha, Jayshree Gadkar, Asha Kale, Usha Chavan, Madhu Kambikar, Sukanya Kulkarni, Reema Lagoo, Madhavi Juvekar, Mrunmayee Deshpande, and Sai Tamhankar.
- Several actresses have won both the Best Actress and Special Jury Award, including Sukanya Kulkarni, Madhu Kambikar, and Smita Tambe.
- Several Best Actress winners had previously received the Best Female Debut award. These include Mukta Barve, who won Best Female Debut in 2004, and Mrunmayee Deshpande, who won the debut award in 2010. Rinku Rajguru is the only Best Actress winner to have previously received the Best Child Artist award, which she won in 2015 for Sairat.
- As of 2024, Rajeshwari Sachdev remains the youngest recipient of the Best Actress award, having won at the age of 17 for Aayatya Gharat Gharoba (1991). Prior to her, the record was jointly held by Alka Kubal, who won at age 20 for Streedhan (1985), and Varsha Usgaonkar, who won at the same age for Gammat Jammat (1987). Suhas Joshi is the oldest recipient of the award, having won for Tu Tithe Mee in 1998.

== Winners and nominees ==
List of award recipients, showing the year, role(s) and film(s)
Year	Photos of winners	Recipient(s)	Role(s)	Work(s)	Refs.
1962		Sulochana Latkar	Paru Kumbhar	Prapanch	
1963		Usha Kiran	Mangala	Garibagharchi Lek	
1964		Seema Deo	Sulabha	Pahu Re Kiti Vaat	
1965		Asha Potdar	Champa	Vavtal	
1966		Jayshree Gadkar	Parvati Lohar	Sadhi Mansa	
1967		Jayshree Gadkar	Mrs. Patil	Patlachi Soon	
1968		Jayshree Gadkar	Laxmi	Thamb Laxmi Kunku Lavte	
1969		Anupama	Geeta	Aadhar	
1970		Surekha	Meena	Dhakti Bahin	
1971		Asha Kale	Savitri	Chuda Tuza Savitricha	
1972–73		Surekha	Suru	Bholi Bhabdi	
1974		Uma Bhende	Rangu	Ashi Hi Sataryachi Tarha	
1975		Jayshree Gadkar	Ganga	Ghar Gangechya Kathi	
1976		Kanan Kaushal	Indu	Pahuni	
1977		Asha Kale	Madhuri	Bala Gau Kashi Angai	
1978		Smita Patil	Chindhi	Jait Re Jait	
1979		Usha Chavan	Maina	Bot Lavin Tithe Gudgulya	
1980		Usha Chavan	Maina	Ranpakhare	
1981		Ranjana Deshmukh	Ratna Desai	Are Sansar Sansar	
1982		Madhu Kambikar	Bijli	Shapit	
1983		Ranjana Deshmukh	Hema	Gupchup Gupchup	
1984		Madhu Kambikar	Sakhu	Hech Maze Maher	
1985		Alka Kubal	Ratna	Streedhan	
1986		Alka Kubal	Anuradha Suryavanshi	Tuzya Vachun Karmena	
1987		Varsha Usgaonkar	Kalpana Dadasaheb Korde / Mrs. Gautami / Mrs. Phalgun Vadke (Note: Varsha played a single character which had multiple different names.)	Gammat Jammat	
1988		Supriya Pilgaonkar	Saudamini	Maza Pati Karodpati	
1989		Savita Prabhune	Uma Desai	Kalat Nakalat	
1990		Nivedita Saraf	Priya	Tujhi Majhi Jamli Jodi	
1991		Rajeshwari Sachdev	Kanan Narhari Kirtikar / Kanan Kanvinde (Note: Rajeshwari played a single character which had two different names.)	Aayatya Gharat Gharoba	
1992		Ashwini Bhave	Aasha Sathe	Aahuti	
1993		Neena Kulkarni	Seema Madhukar Hirve	Savat Mazi Ladki	
1994		Sonali Kulkarni	Mukta Kansepatil	Mukta	
1995		Sonali Kulkarni	Krishna	Doghi	
1996		Sukanya Kulkarni	Swati	Putravati	
1997		Varsha Usgaonkar	Pooja	Paij Lagnachi	
1998		Suhas Joshi	Usha Nanasaheb Date	Tu Tithe Mee	
1999		Aishwarya Narkar	Mukta Deshmukh	Ghe Bharari	
2000		Tabu	Aditi Pandit	Astitva	
2001		Shilpa Tulaskar	Sujata Paranjpe	Devki	
2002		Reema Lagoo	Anna Smith	Reshamgath	
2003		Aditi Deshpande	Mrs. Vidya Raut	Not Only Mrs. Raut	
2004		Sonali Kulkarni	Seena Gore	Devrai	
2005		Aishwarya Narkar	Aru	Zuluk	
2006		Nandita Das	Chandi	Maati Maay	
2007		Ashwini Bhave	Dr. Gayetri	Kadachit	
2008		Mukta Barve	Suli	Jogwa	
2009		Madhavi Juvekar	Manda	Jhing Chik Jhing	
2010		Mitalee Jagtap Varadkar	Shimri	Baboo Band Baaja	
2011		Manasi Salvi	ACP Vidya Pandit	Sadarakshanaay	
2012		Priya Bapat	Uma Dhamle	Kaksparsh	
2013		Smita Tambe	Radhakka	72 Miles	
2014		Priya Bapat	Janaki	Happy Journey	
2014		Usha Jadhav	Yashoda	Dhag	
2015		Mukta Barve	Manjiri Naik	Double Seat	
2015		Smita Tambe	Sugandha	Partu	
2015		Mrunmayee Deshpande	Saumya	Anuraag	
2016		Iravati Harshe	Janaki	Kaasav	
2017		Pooja Sawant	Ashwini	Bhetali Tu Punha	
2017		Chhaya Kadam	Chhaya	Redu	
2017		Tejashri Pradhan	Kiran Paranjpe	Asehi Ekada Vhave	
2018		Mukta Barve	Madhavi Sawant	Bandishala	
2019		Mrunmayee Deshpande	Kaveri	Miss U Mister	
2019		Sonali Kulkarni	Vimal	Pension	
2019		Bhagyashree Milind	Anandi Gopal Joshi	Anandi Gopal	
2020		Mrinmayee Godbole	Preeti	Godakath	
2020		Sayali Sanjeev	Indrayani	Goshta Eka Paithanichi	
2020		Akshaya Gurav	Saguna	Bittersweet	
2021		Sonali Kulkarni	Archana	Tich Shahar Hona	
2021		Mrunmayee Deshpande	Shefali	Bebhaan	
2021		Smita Tambe	Gauri	Gaurichya Lagnala Yayach haa	
2022		Amruta Khanvilkar	Chandramukhi Junnarkar	Chandramukhi	
2022		Sai Tamhankar	Nikita	Pondicherry	
2022		Sonalee Kulkarni	Shefali	Tamasha Live	
2023		Rinku Rajguru	Malti	Asha	
2023		Vaidehi Parshurami	Juliet	Jaggu Ani Juliet	
2023		Kiran Khoje	Janabai Bhoyar	Terava	
2024		Swati Gotawale	Jana	Chabila	
2024		Nandini Chikte	Savita	Sthal	
2024		Suruchi Adarkar	Kusari	Ghaath	
