= Shrikant Moghe =

Indian actor (1929–2021)

- Born: Shrikant Moghe; 6 November 1929; Kirloskarvadi, Maharashtra, India
- Died: 6 March 2021 (aged 91); Pune, Maharashtra, India
- Occupation: Actor
- Known for: Navri Mile Navryala; Gammat Jammat
- Spouse: Shobhana Moghe
- Children: Shantanu Moghe
- Relatives: Priya Marathe (daughter-in-law)

Shrikant Moghe (6 November 1929 – 6 March 2021) was an Indian film and theatre actor who worked in several Hindi and Marathi films. He is better known as Bhaurao Deshmukh in Navri Mile Navryala (1984) and Dadasaheb Korde in Gammat Jammat (1987).

== Career ==
Moghe was famous for his roles in Marathi films like Madhuchandra, Sinhasan, Gammat Jammat, Umbaratha and Vasudev Balwant Phadke; and Marathi stage plays Varyavarchi Varaat, Tuze Aahe Tujapashi and Lekure Udand Jali.

== Personal life ==
Shrikant Moghe grew up in Kirloskarwadi, near Sangli, in Maharashtra, India. Shrikant Moghe's son Shantanu Moghe is also an actor, who played Shivaji I in Zee Marathi's TV series Swarajyarakshak Sambhaji and father in law of late actress Priya Marathe (1987 - 2025). The late Poet-lyricist Sudhir Moghe (1939-2014) was his younger brother. Shrikant Moghe died in Pune in March 2021, at the age of 91.
