= Asha Kale =

Indian actress

- Born: Asha Kale; 23 November 1948 (age 77); Kolhapur, Maharashtra, India
- Other name: Gauri Naik
- Occupation: Actress
- Years active: 1962–1996
- Spouse: Madhav Naik (m. 1992)

Asha Kale (23 November 1948) is an actress in India's Marathi Language film industry. Through her work in 70s and 80s she established herself as one of Marathi cinema's leading actresses. She is recipient of two Maharashtra State Film Awards and a Filmfare Award Marathi. In 2010, she was given the V. Shantaram Lifetime Achievement Award by the Government of Maharashtra. She also received Filmfare Marathi Lifetime Achievement Award.

== Early life ==
Kale was born in Gadhinglaj, Kolhapur. Her father had a government job at the Forest Office, where he also had knowledge of astrology. Due to transfers every three years, their residence changed frequently, spanning across many villages. After stints in Konkan and Pune, upon retirement, their original village, Kolhapur, became their final destination.

Since she was young, Kale enjoyed dancing. She learned Bharatanatyam and Kathak in Pune and performed in many events. During the India-China war, she danced thumri sang by Asha Bhosle and chorographed by herself in a play called Shivsambhav to help raise funds. Later, she acted on stage offered by Baburao Pendharkar and got film roles with Bhalji Pendharkar's help.

== Personal life ==
Kale married producer and director Madhav Naik in 1992. She met the Naik family through her association with theatre, and that she had not anticipated marrying Madhav when his father, cinematographer Pandurang Naik, attended one of her performances. She described their 25-year marriage as a happy one and credited her husband with supporting her acting career after their marriage. In the same interview, she stated that her husband, parents and brother had passed away.

== Filmography ==
=== Films ===
Year	Title	Role	Notes
1962	Baikocha Bhau	Sindhu	Debut film
1969	Tambadi Mati	Akkasaheb	
1970	Ganane Ghungroo Haravale	Laxmi	
1971	Kunkwacha Karanda	Malati (Malu)	
1971	Chuda Tuza Savitricha	Savitri	
1975	Jyotibacha Navas	Renu	
1976	Ha Khel Sawalyancha	Indumati (Gomu)	
1977	Bala Gau Kashi Angai	Madhuri	
1977	Sasurvasheen	Vachhi	
1979	Ashtavinayak	Herself	
1979	Aaitya Bilavar Nagoba	Kalyani Shastri	
1980	Sansar	Sharu Manohar	
1981	Satichi Punyayee	Sheila Sawant	
1981	Ganimi Kawa	Saibai	
1982	Thorli Jaau	Urmila	
1982	Chandane Shimpit Ja		
1983	Devta	Chandrika	
1984	Jagavegali Prem Kahani	Tai	
1984	Kulswamini Ambabai	Laxmi	
1984	Chorachya Manat Chandane	Gulabrao's wife	
1984	Maherchi Manase	Mangala Bhosale	
1985	Ardhangi	Bhujangrao's wifry	
1988	Aai Pahije	Laxmi Deshy	
1988	Bandiwan Mi Ya Sansari	Kamal	
1988	Nashibwan	Vahinisaheb	
1991	Bandhan	Janaki	
1992	Shubh Mangal Savdhan	Rajesh's mother	
1996	Putravati	Kapil's mother	

=== Drama ===
- Rukhmini
- Ek Roop Anek Rang
- Ekhadi Tari SmitResha
- Gahire Rang
- Guntata Hruday He
- Ghar Shrimantcha
- Deve Deenaghari Dhavala
- Nal Damayanti
- Paulkhuna
- Fakt Ekach Karan
- Beiman
- Maharani Padmini
- Mumbaichi Manase
- Lahanpan Dega Deva
- Varshav
- Waryaat Misalale Paani
- Wahato hi Durvanchi Judi (850 Prayog)
- Vishvrukshachi Chaaya
- Vegala Vhayachay Mala
- Sate Lote
- Seemevaroon Parat Ja (1963)
- Sangeet Saubhadra

== Awards ==
- Maharashtra State Film Award for Best Actress for Chuda Tuza Savitricha
- Filmfare Awards for Best Actress – Marathi for Ha Khel Sawalyancha
- Maharashtra State Film Award for Best Actress for Bala Gau Kashi Angai
- V. Shantaram Award by Government of Maharashtra
- Sanskruti Kaladarpan Kala Gaurav Award
- Filmfare Marathi Lifetime Achievement Award
- Zee Chitra Gaurav Lifetime Achievement Award
- Bhalji Award for Special Contribution in Marathi Cinema
- Balgandharva Lifetime Achievement Award
- Maharashtracha Favourite Kon? Award for Special Contribution in Marathi Cinema

== See also ==
- Kashinath Ghanekar
