= Padma Chavan =

Indian actress

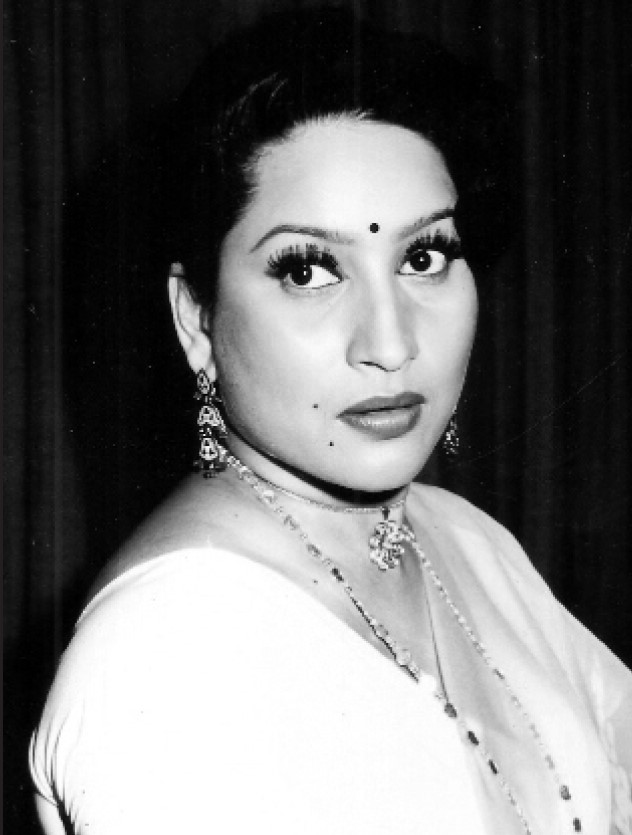
- Born: 7 July 1944; Kolhapur state, Bombay Presidency, British India
- Died: 12 September 1996 (aged 52); Mumbai, Maharashtra, India
- Occupation: Actress
- Years active: 1957–1996
- Spouse: Kamlakar Torane (m. 1966, separated)

Padma Chavan was an Indian actress who appeared in Marathi and Hindi films, television and theatres. Chavan made her acting debut in 1959 opposite Ramesh Deo in the movie Akashganga. She was famously known as Maharashtra's Marilyn Monroe.

== Early life ==
Padma Chavan was born on 7 July 1944 into a prominent Sardar family from Kolhapur, Maharashtra. She was the daughter of Captain Annasaheb Chavan. She completed her primary education, but chose to leave formal schooling at a young age to pursue her interest in acting and a career in cinema.

In 1959, at the age of 15, Chavan made her screen debut in the film Akashganga, directed by the acclaimed filmmaker Bhalji Pendharkar. Her natural screen presence and appearance facilitated her early entry into the industry, allowing her to establish herself as an actress during the formative years of her career.

== Career ==
Chavan’s career spanned several decades, during which she worked in Marathi and Hindi cinema, as well as Marathi theatre. She was noted for her versatility in portraying both urban and rural characters. Her performances in the films Ya Sukhano Ya (1975) and Aaram Haram Aahe (1976) earned her awards from the Government of Maharashtra. In the context of Marathi theatre, she appeared in plays such as Lagnachi Bedi, Majhi Bayko Majhi Mehuni!, and Guntata Hridaya He. Following her performance in the play Lakhat Ashi Dekhani, writer-director Acharya Atre referred to her as the "Marilyn Monroe of Maharashtra" and the "Atom Bomb of Beauty."

Chavan also appeared in several Hindi films, including Aadmi, Bin Badal Barsaat, and Kashmir Ki Kali, where she frequently played antagonistic roles. Her extensive filmography includes notable appearances in Akashganga (1959), Avaghachi Sansar (1960), Sangata Jadali Tuzi Na Majhi (1960), Zhala Mahar Pandharinath (1970), Lakhat Ashi Dekhani (1971), Anolkhi (1973), Jyotibacha Navas (1975), Tuch Mazi Rani (1976), Devghar (1981), and Gupchup Gupchup (1983). After her marriage to director Kamlakar Torne, she transitioned into character roles. Her later successful film appearances included Ashtavinayak (1979), Sasu Varchad Jawai (1983), Ghayal (1993), and Porka (1993).

== Personal life ==
Chavan married filmmaker Kamalakar Torne in 1966. The couple reportedly separated in the late 1970s. In 1981, she met Marathi writer Chandrakant Khot on the sets of the Hindi film Naram Garam. The two developed a relationship. Their relationship later became strained and led to a legal dispute between them. She died following a car accident.

== Filmography ==
=== Films ===
Year	Film	Role	Notes
1959	Aakashganga	Padma	Debut film
1959	Mr. X	Singh's Assistant	Hindi film
1960	Avaghachi Sansar	Asha	
1960	Sangat Jadli Tujhi An Majhi		
1961	Suhag Sindoor	Nalini	Hindi film
1961	Stree	Padma	Hindi film
1961	Bin Badal Barsaat	Padma	Hindi film
1964	Challenge		Hindi film
1964	Kashmir Ki Kali	Karuna	Hindi film
1964	Ek Don Teen	Rosie	Hindi film
1965	Flying Man		Hindi film
1965	Shahi Raqasa		Hindi film
1965	Aadhi Raat Ke Baad	Helen	Hindi film
1965	Sher Dil	Unnamed	Cameo
1966	Daku Mangal Singh	Princess	Hindi film
1966	Naagin Aur Saphera	Naagin	Hindi film
1968	Aadmi	Parvati	Hindi film
1970	Jhala Mahar Pandharinath	Aawali	
1971	Lakhat Ashi Dekhni	Parvati/Akka	
1973	Anolkhi		
1975	Jyotibacha Navas	Padmaja	
1975	Zinda Dil	Parvati Sharma	Hindi film
1975	Ya Sukhano Ya		
1976	Aaram Haram Aahe	Pammi	
1977	Tuch Mazi Rani	Rani	
1977	Aadmi Sadak Ka	Kamla S. Nath	Hindi film
1977	Bala Gau Kashi Angai	Unnamed	Cameo
1977	Jai Bolo Chakradhari		Hindi film
1977	Jagriti		Hindi film
1977	Gayatri Mahima		Hindi film
1978	Bot Lavin Tithe Gudgulya		
1978	Netaji Palkar	Jijabai	
1978	Karwa Chouth	Rani	
1978	Dost Asava Tar Asa		
1979	Javayachi Jaat	Sujata	
1979	Ashtavinayak	Maai Inamdar	
1979	Aapli Manse		
1980	Sharan Tula Bhagwanta		
1980	Devapudhe Manus		
1981	Naram Garam	Ratna	
1981	Nanand Bhavjay	Nanand	
1981	Khoon Ki Takkar	Thakur's Wife	
1981	Mahabali Hanuman	Mandodari	
1981	Devghar	Baisaheb	
1982	Baghavat	Maharani	
1982	Jeevan Dhaara	Sadhana Malhotra	
1982	Ashanti	Kumar's Mother	
1982	Angoor	Alka	
1982	Navare Sagle Gadhav	Sonavare	
1982	Kuvari		
1982	Kai Ga Sakhu		
1982	Dulha Bikta Hai		
1982	Daulat	Aunty	
1983	Jeet Hamaari	Nirmala Singh	
1983	Sadma	Madam	
1983	Sansar Pakhrancha		
1983	Sasu Varchad Jawai	Gangu Telinbai Teli	
1983	Gupchup Gupchup	Madam Jawalkar	
1984	Aao Jao Ghar Tumhara		
1984	Maqsad	Mistress Pratap	
1984	Shraddha		
1987	Premasathi Vattel Te	Durga	
1987	Khara Kadhi Bolu Naye	Saralabai Khote	
1988	Woh Phir Aayegi	Kamla	
1988	Hamara Khandaan		
1988	Do Waqt Ki Roti	Pammi	
1990	Kasam Dhande Ki	Satyaprakash's foster mother	
1990	Ghabraiche Nahin	Anusayabai	
1993	Ghayaal	Anandibai Mandke	
1993	Porka		
1993	Janmathep	Vahini Saheb	
1996	Ashi Asavi Sasu	Mavshi	

=== Play and role ===
- Lagnachi Bedi (Rashmi)
- Mazi Bayko Mazi Mevhani (Rasika)
- Navryachi Dhamal Tar Baykochi Kamal (Sunita)
- Sakhi Shejarini (Preeti)
- Biwi Kari Salaam (Rama)
- Mavali (Alaknanda)
- Guntata Hruday He (Kalyani)
- Vaje Paul Aapule (Sushila)
- Lafada Sadan (Sandika)
- Pijara (Aai)
- Baykola Jevha Jaag Yete (Avantika)
- Mhanun Mi Tula Kuthe Net Nahi (Satyabhama)

== See also ==
- Marathi cinema
- Hindi cinema
