= Ravindra Mahajani =

Indian actor (1946–2023)

- Mahajani in 80s
- Born: 7 October 1946; Belgaum, Bombay Province, India
- Died: 11 July 2023 (aged 77); Ambi, Maharashtra, India
- Occupations: Actor; director
- Years active: 1976–2023
- Spouse: Madhavi Mahajani (m. 1971)
- Children: 2, (including Gashmeer Mahajani)

Ravindra Mahajani (7 October 1946 – 11 July 2023) was an Indian Marathi film actor and director. He featured in Marathi films from the late 1970s until his death in 2023.

== Career ==
In his early career, Mahajani drove taxis and auditioned for films. He created Marathi films until 1987–1988.

Mahajani was known as "the Vinod Khanna of the Marathi film industry" due to his personality and looks. Because of his resemblance to Vinod Khanna, director N. Chandra wanted him to star in his 1986 film Ankush but Mahajani rejected the offer.

Mahajani featured in many romantic songs, including "Ha Sagari Kinara", "Sumbaran Gao Deva", and "Phite Andharache Jaale". His film Devta is popular among rural fans. His chemistry with Ranjana Deshmukh and Asha Kale was Famous, He did numerous films with both of them. He is known for his roles in Duniya Kari Salam (1979), Mumbaicha Faujdar (1984), Zunj (1975), Kalat Nakalat (1989) and Aaram Haram Ahe (1976). The latter was a Major Hit. He made a comeback with 2015 film Kay Rao Tumhi.

In an interaction with TV9, Ashok Saraf shared that "Sincerity was his greatest quality, he excelled in every role. Whatever he did, he did it with his heart, so he was one of the most successful actors of our time."

== Education ==
Ravindra Mahajani completed his schooling from Raja Shivaji Vidyalaya, Mumbai. He completed his graduation from Guru Nanak Khalsa College of Arts, Science & Commerce, Mumbai. His father H. R. Mahajani was an editor of Marathi-language newspaper.

== Personal life ==
Ravindra Mahajani had a daughter and a son, Gashmeer Mahajani, who is a television and film actor.

== Filmography ==
Year	Film	Role	Language	Notes
1969	Saat Hindustani	Police Inspector	Hindi	Hindi debut film
1975	Zunj	Arjun Bhausaheb Nangre	Marathi	Marathi debut film
1976	Aaram Haram Aahe	Mahesh Kuber/Suresh Vichare	Marathi	
1976	Dharti Mata	Ravi	Hindi	
1977	Padarachya Savleet	Khandu	Marathi	
1977	Jai Bolo Chakradhari	Mukta's husband	Hindi	
1978	Chandoba Chandoba Bhaglas Ka	Chandoba	Marathi	
1978	Lakshmi	Lakshmi's husband	Marathi	
1979	Duniya Kari Salam	Amol (Paramanand)	Marathi	
1979	Ashtavinayak	Himself	Marathi	Special appearance in the song “Ashtavinayaka Tuza Mahima”
1979	Haldi Kunku	Shree	Marathi	
1979	Teen Cheharey	Ravi	Hindi	
1979	Lage Bandhe	Lakya Sutar	Marathi	
1979	Gyanbachi Mekh	Gyanba	Marathi	
1980	Choravar More	Raja	Marathi	
1980	Sulavarchi Poli	Sameer	Marathi	
1980	Sahkar Samrat	Ravi	Marathi	
1980	Savali Premachi	Abdul	Marathi	
1980	Paij	Arjun	Marathi	
1980	Mantryachi Sun	Mantri's son	Marathi	
1980	Hich Khari Daulat	Sadhu	Marathi	
1981	Soon Mazi Laxmi	Yashwantrao Vastad	Marathi	
1981	Satichi Punyaai	Shekhar Sawant	Marathi	
1981	Devghar	Ravi	Marathi	Short film
1981	Gondhalat Gondhal	Ravindra Ghatge	Marathi	
1982	Laxmichi Paule	Prakash	Marathi	
1982	Galli Te Dilli	Inspector L.K.Sawant	Marathi	
1982	Raakhandar	Vilas	Marathi	
1982	Thorli Jau	Sadashiv	Marathi	
1982	Bahu Ho Toh Aisi	Raj	Hindi	
1982	Malavarcha Phool	Ravindra	Marathi	
1983	Devta	Lakhan Pal	Marathi	
1983	Be Aabroo	Inspector Rakesh	Marathi	
1983	Kashala Udyachi Baat	Nilesh Sagle	Marathi	
1983	He Dan Kunkvache	Shyam	Marathi	
1984	Hech Mazha Maher	Sadashiv	Marathi	
1984	Mumbaicha Faujdar	Jaisingh Rao Mohite	Marathi	
1984	Zakhmi Waghin	Dhaklya Patil	Marathi	
1984	Maherchi Manase	Dr. Ajit Deshmukh	Marathi	
1986	Badkaar	Reporter Rakesh	Hindi	
1986	Wahem	Sameer Sharma	Hindi	
1986	Yeh Preet Na Hogi Kam	Preetesh	Hindi	
1987	Sarja	Shivaji I	Marathi	
1987	Antarpat	Dr. Vijay (Viju)	Marathi	
1988	Unad Maina	Ravi	Marathi	
1989	Goonj	Dennis Periera	Hindi	
1990	Kalat Nakalat	Vinay Rege	Marathi	
1990	Julum	Inspector Ajay Bendre/Kishya	Marathi	
1990	Dhadaka	Raja	Marathi	
1991	Jeeva Sakha	DK (Main Villain)	Marathi	
1992	Jagavegali Paij	Sarkar	Marathi	
1993	Asha Puramani Ni Chindri	Ravi	Gujarati	
2001	Dekhni Bayko Namyachi	Hindurao Patil	Marathi	
2009	Rangiberangi	Mr. Choudhary	Marathi	
2011	Aajoba Vayat Ale	Rajaram Sukhatme	Marathi	
2012	Sukanya	Dharmaraj Pradhan (Vithoba)	Marathi	
2015	Kaay Raav Tumhi	Retired Captain	Marathi	
2015	Carry On Maratha	Folk Singer	Marathi	Guest appearance
2015	Deool Band	Gajanan Maharaj/Pujari	Marathi	Guest appearance
2019	Panipat	Malharrao Holkar	Marathi	Hindi film
2023	Jasmine	Father	Marathi	Short film

== Awards and Recognitions ==
- Filmfare Award Marathi Best Actor for film Zunj

In the year 2010, Mahajani was awarded with 'Sarvashreshtha Kala Gaurav Puraskar' instituted by Sankskruti kala Darpan

After receiving award, Mahajani said, "Mr. Bhatt signed me for his film first and then for two months he himself offered me tuitions in Gujarathi. It was only after that he launched his film. Later I worked in 11 Gujarathi films besides working in Marathi films.” He further said that after winning his first Filmfare Award, he was appreciated by Bharatratna Lata Mangeshkar.

== Death ==
Mahajani was found dead at his residence in Ambi village, Maval, on 14 July 2023. He was 77.
