= List of Marathi film actors =

'Pioneers of Marathi cinema'
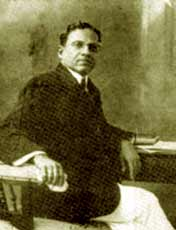
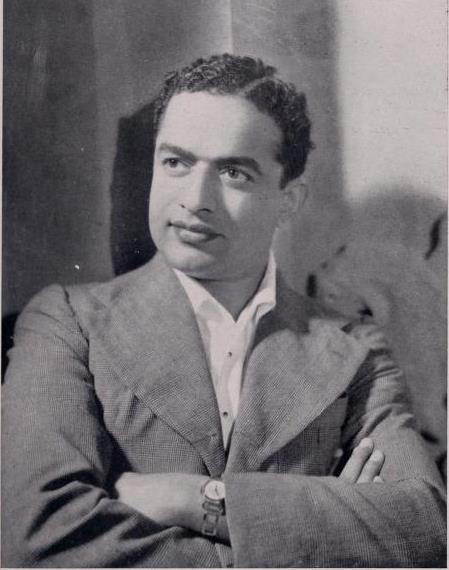
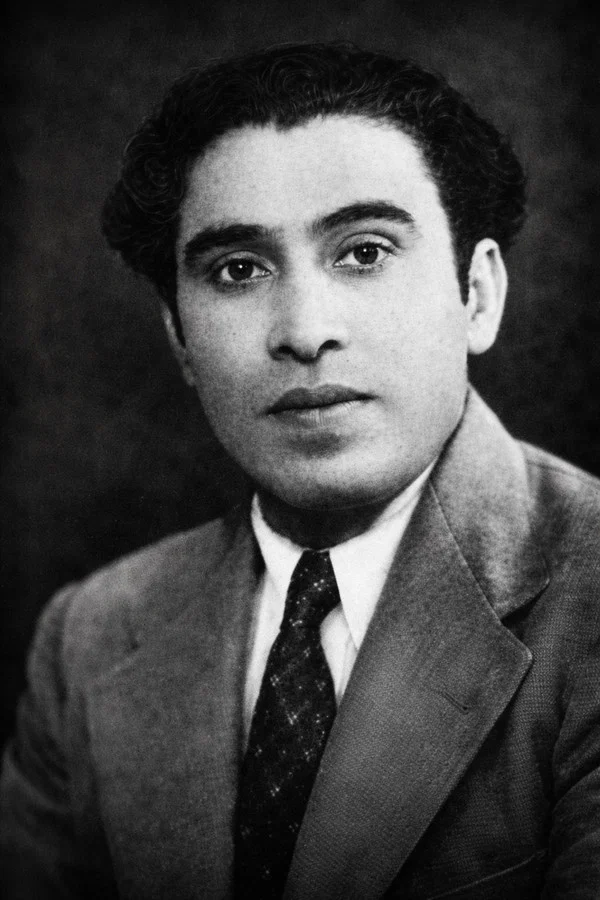
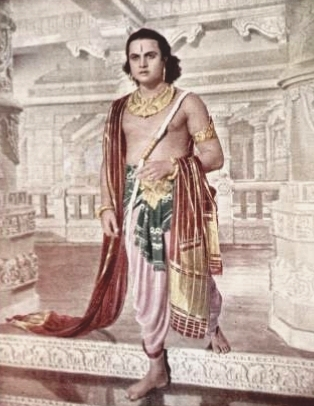
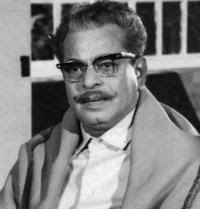
(left to right) Dadasaheb Phalke, V. Shantaram, Master Vinayak, Shahu Modak and Gajanan Jagirdar

'Golden Age superstars'
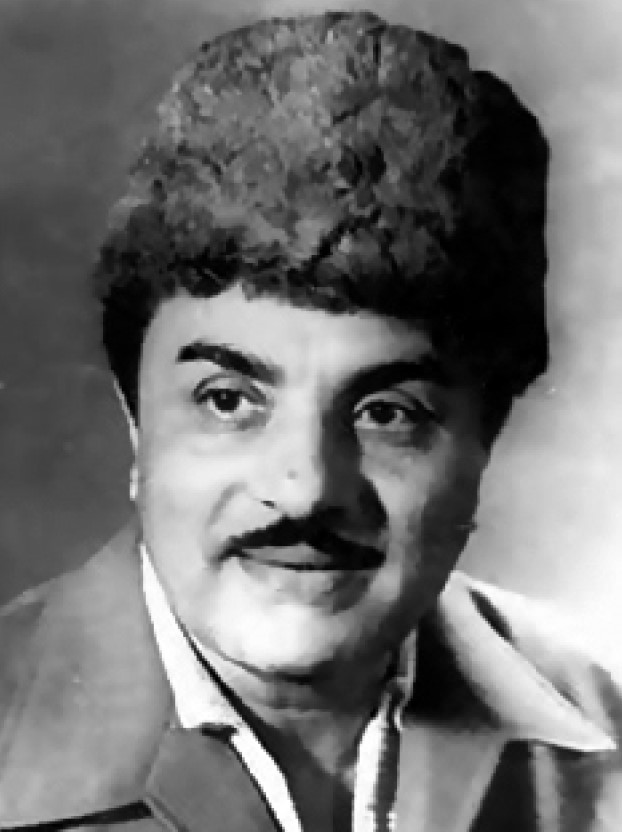
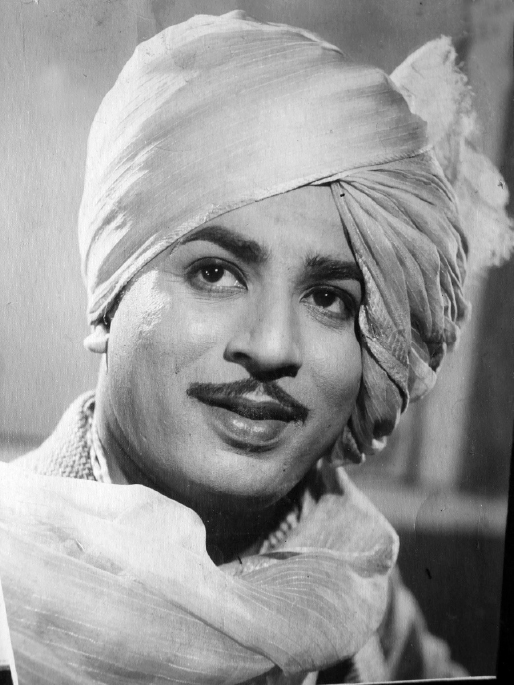
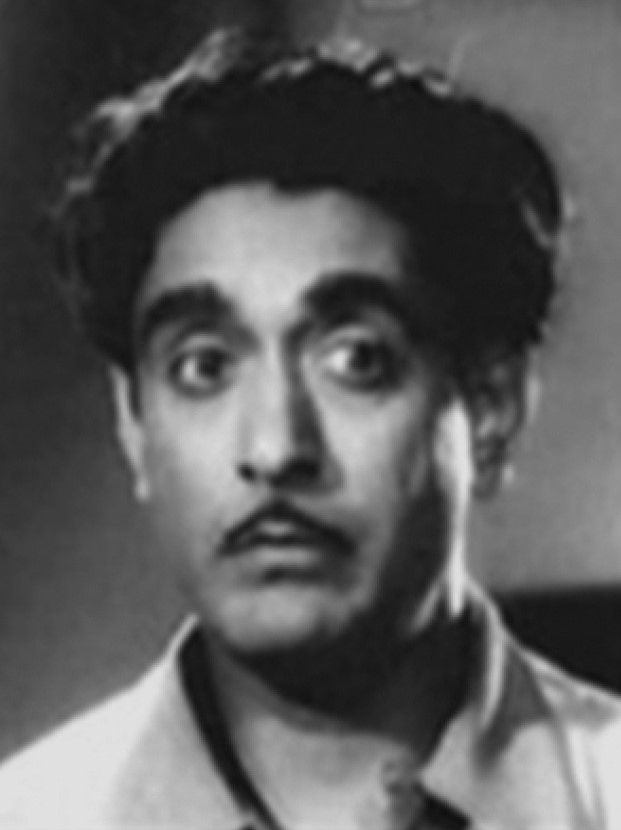
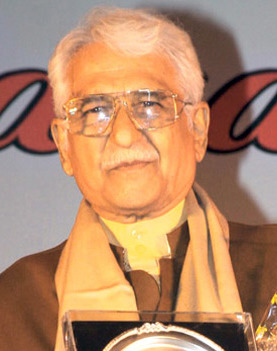
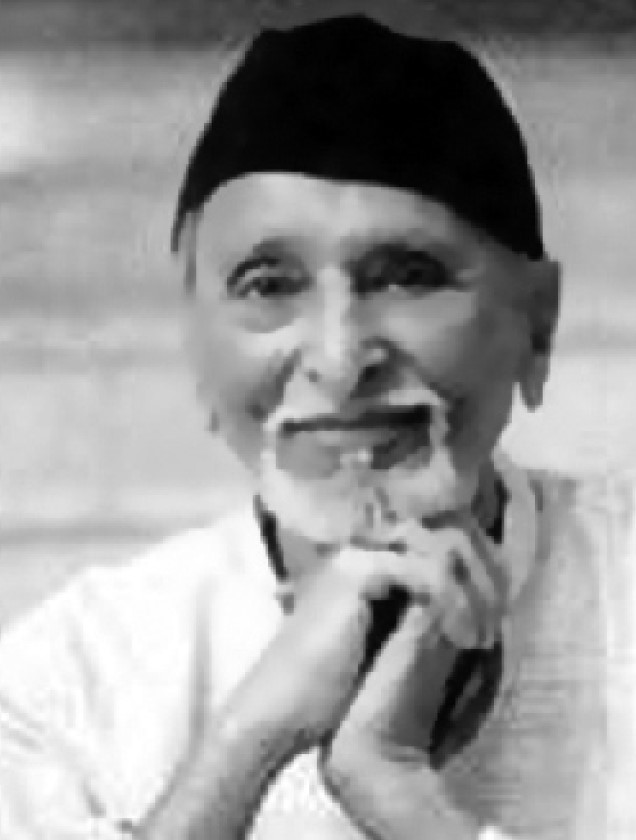
(left to right) Chandrakant Mandare, Suryakant, Raja Gosavi, Ramesh Deo and Chandrakant Gokhale

'1970s icons'
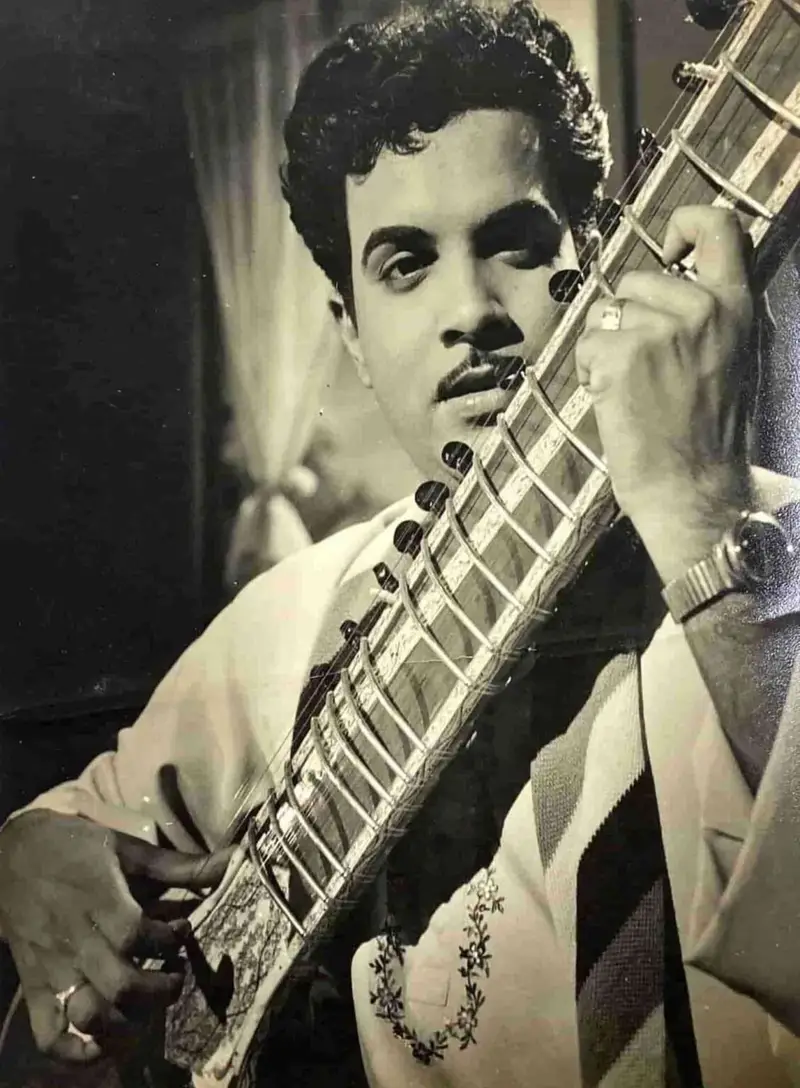
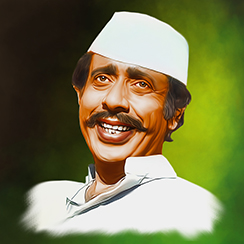
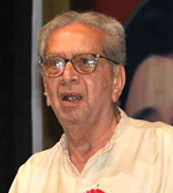
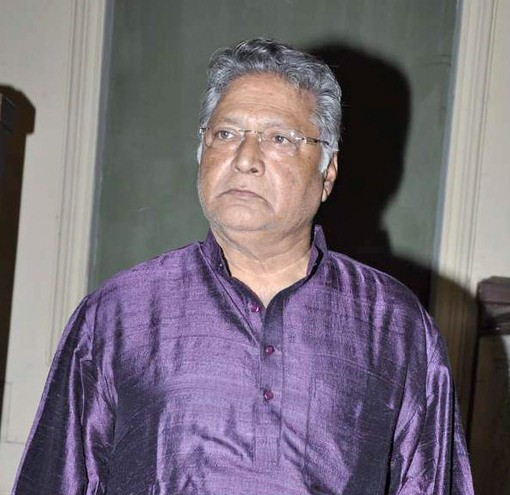
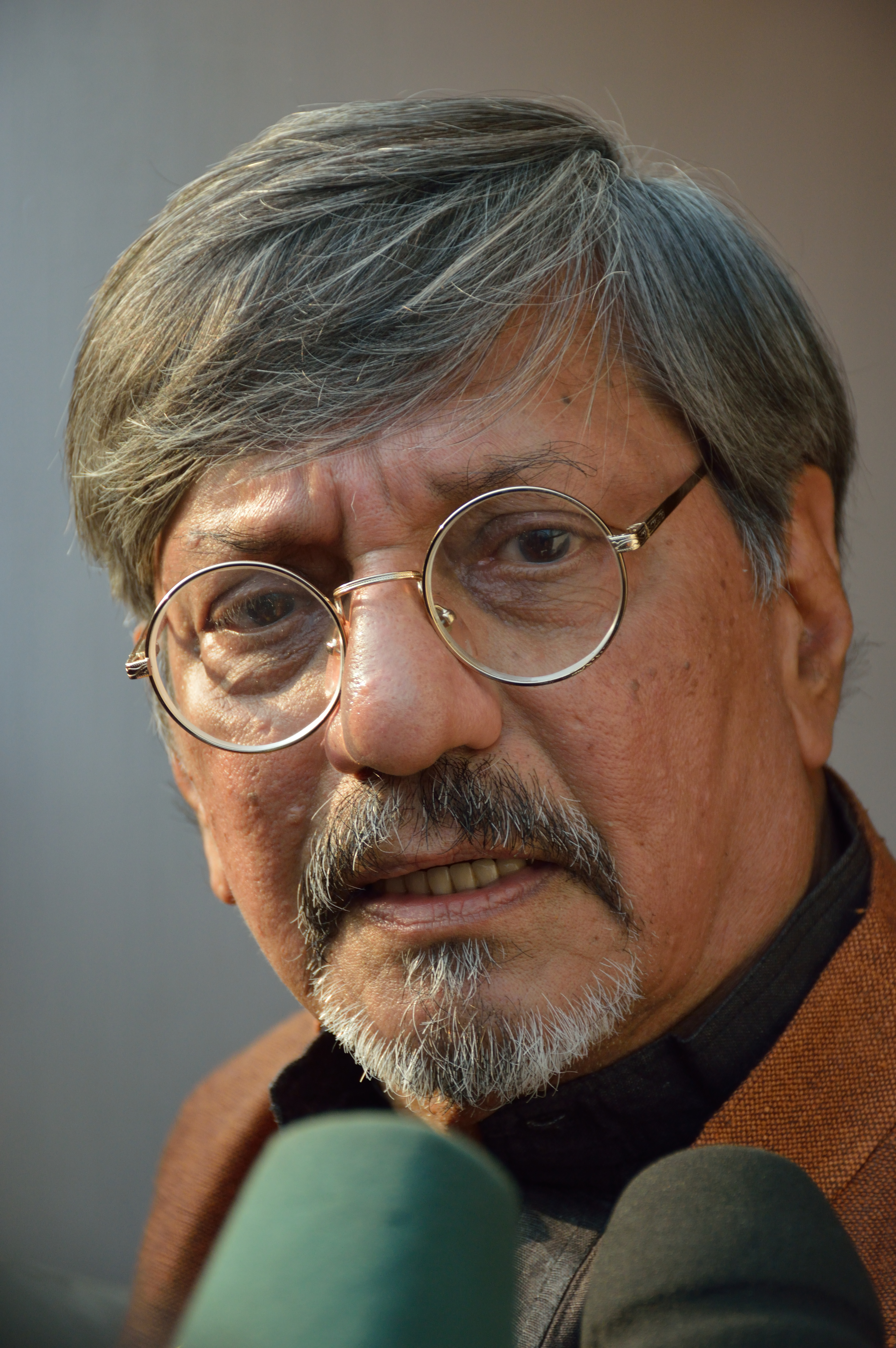
(left to right) Arun Sarnaik, Nilu Phule, Shreeram Lagoo, Vikram Gokhale and Amol Palekar

'1980s Heroes'
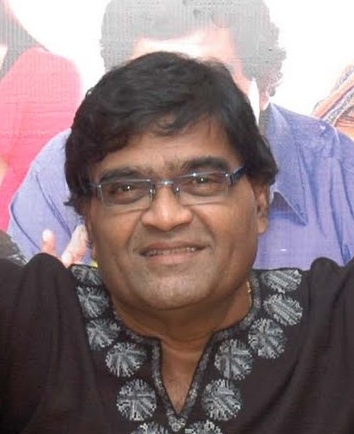
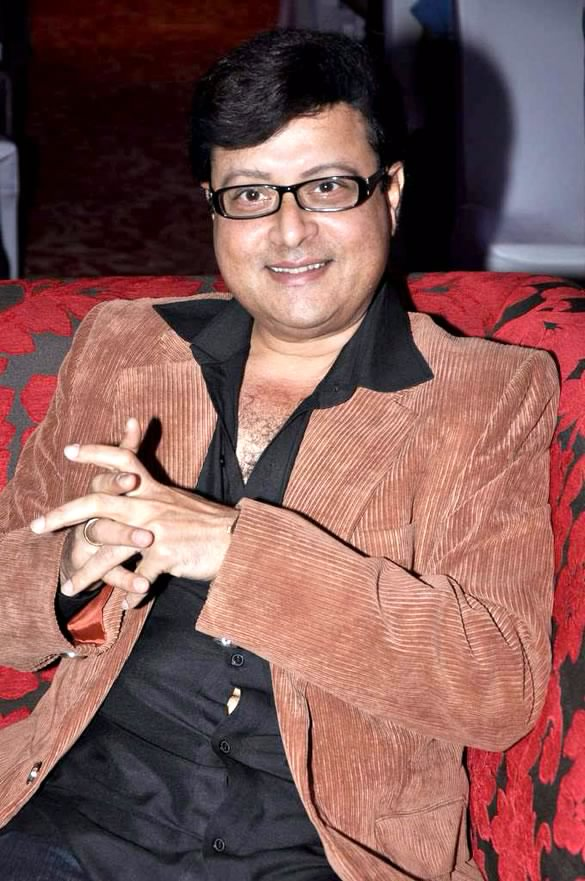
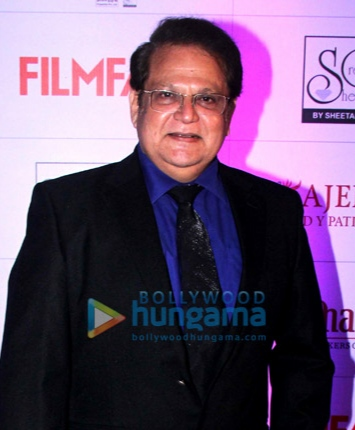
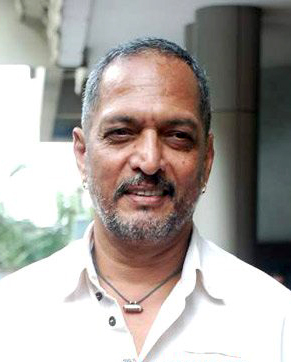
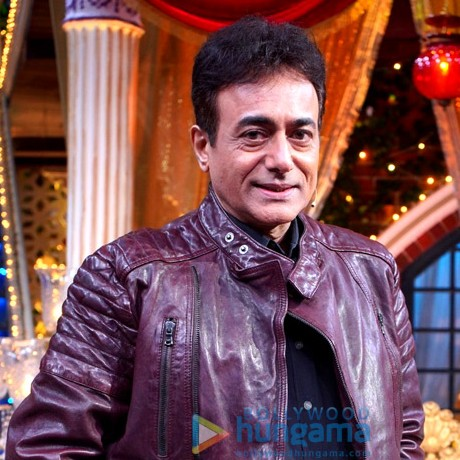
(left to right) Ashok Saraf, Sachin, Mahesh Kothare, Nana Patekar and Nitish Bharadwaj

'1990s superstars'
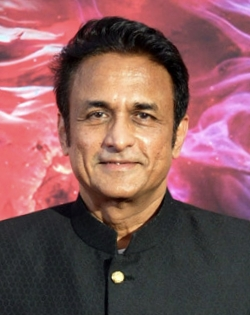
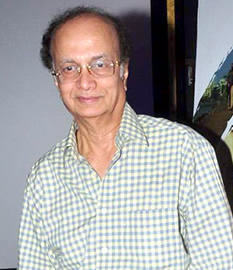
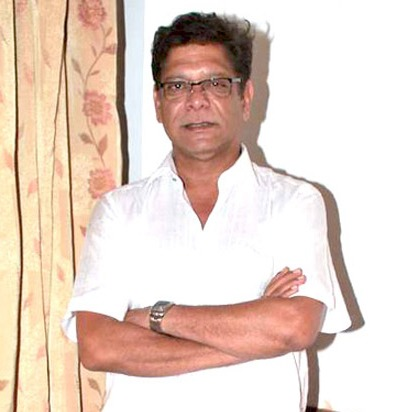
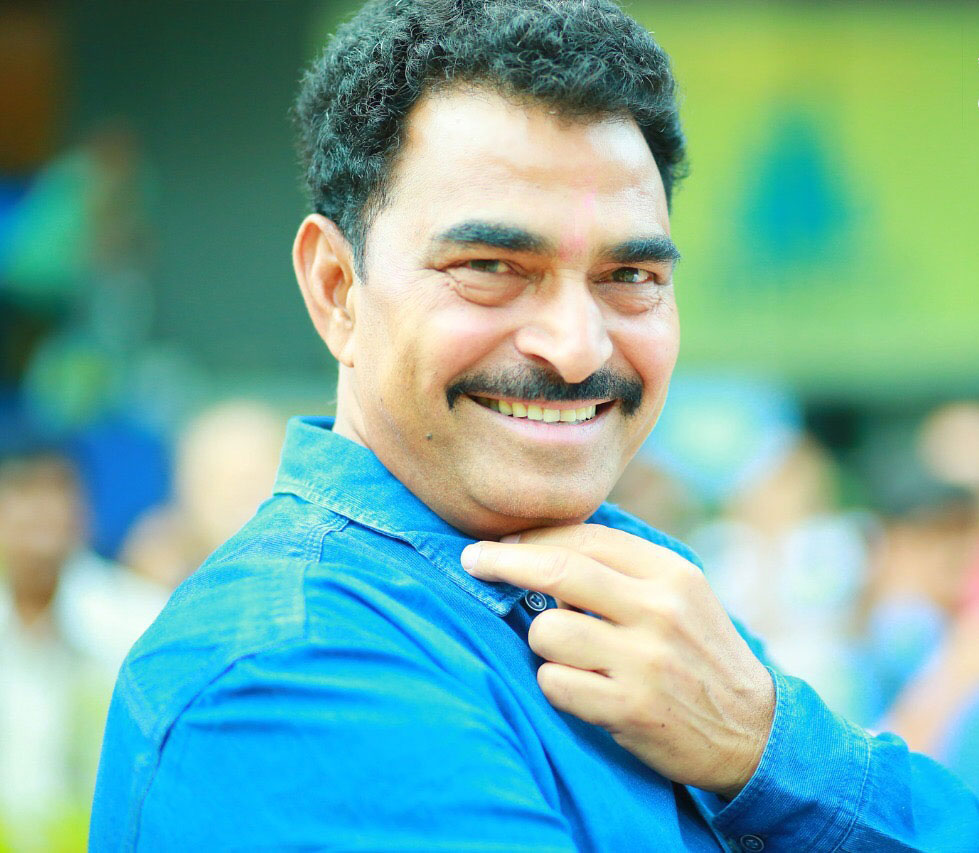
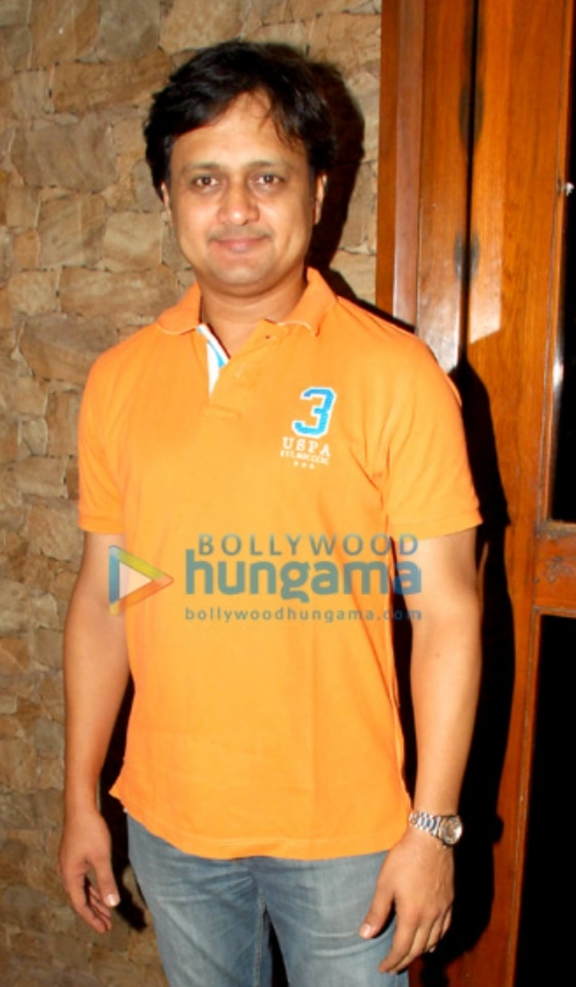
(left to right) Ajinkya Deo, Dilip Prabhavalkar, Mohan Joshi, Sayaji Shinde and Sunil Barve

'2000s megastars'
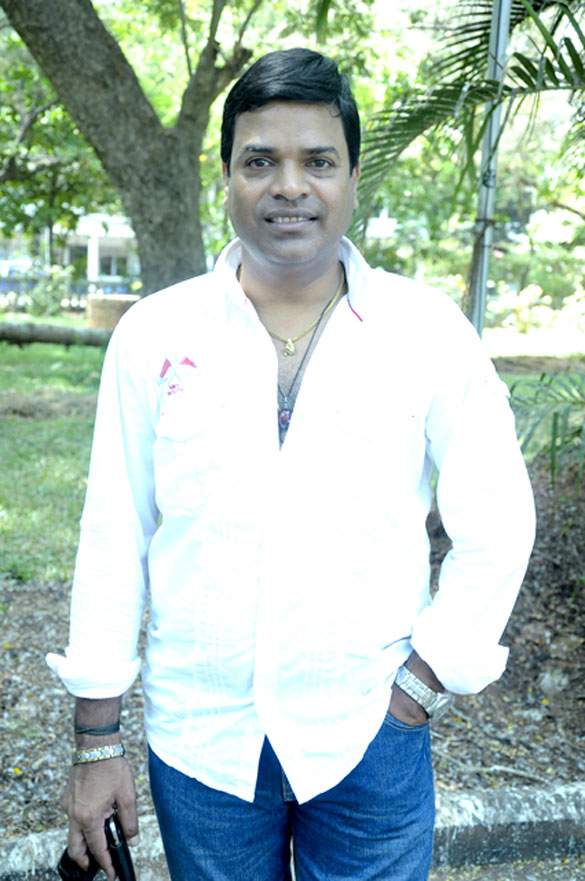
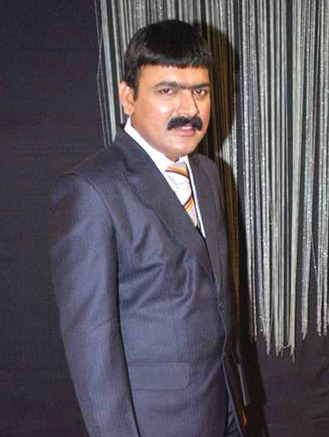
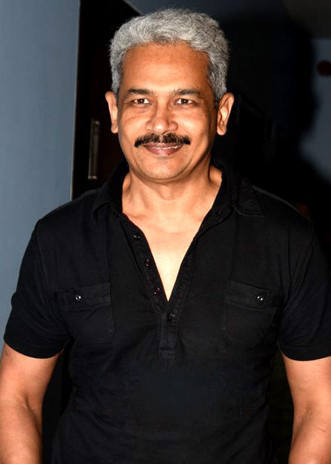
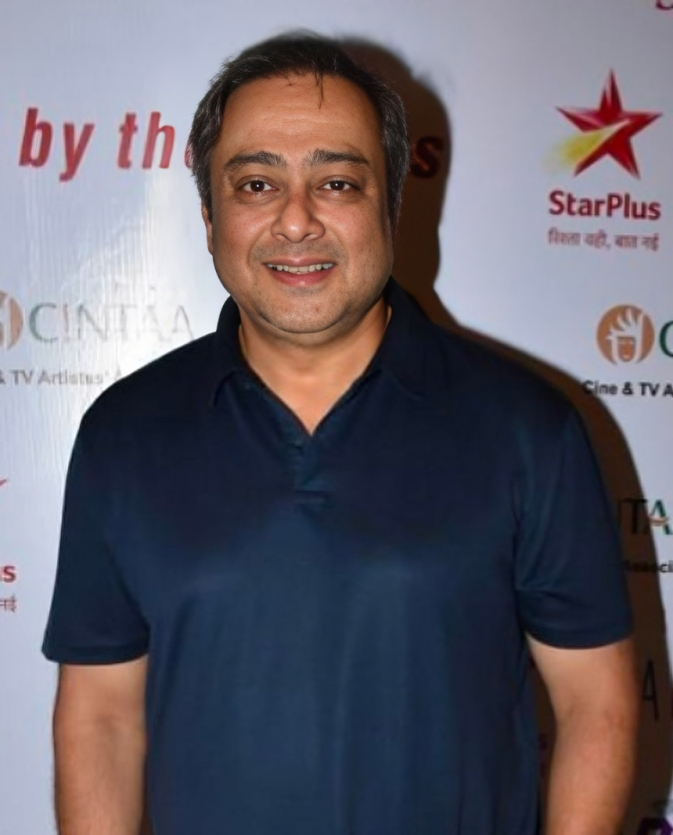
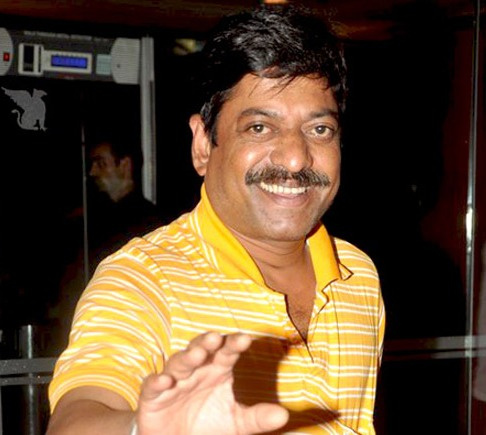
(left to right) Bharat Jadhav, Makarand Anaspure, Atul Kulkarni, Sachin Khedekar and Sanjay Narvekar

2010s maestro
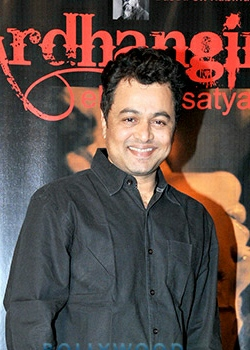
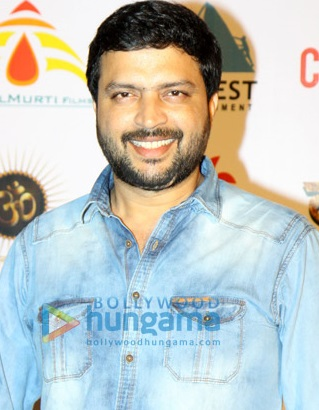
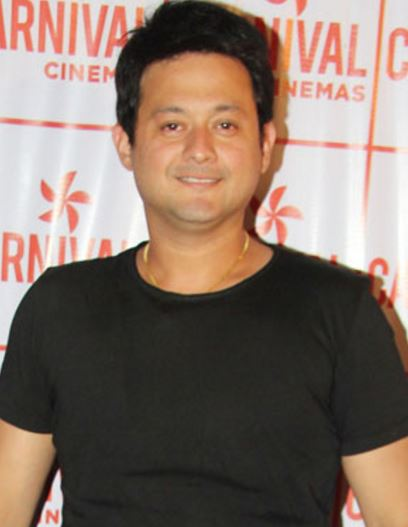
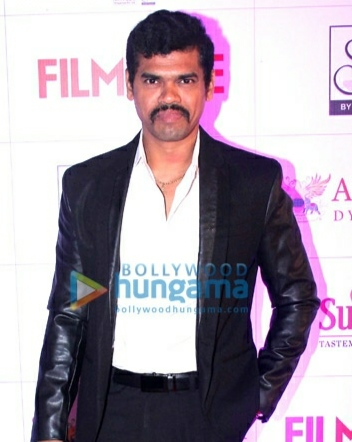
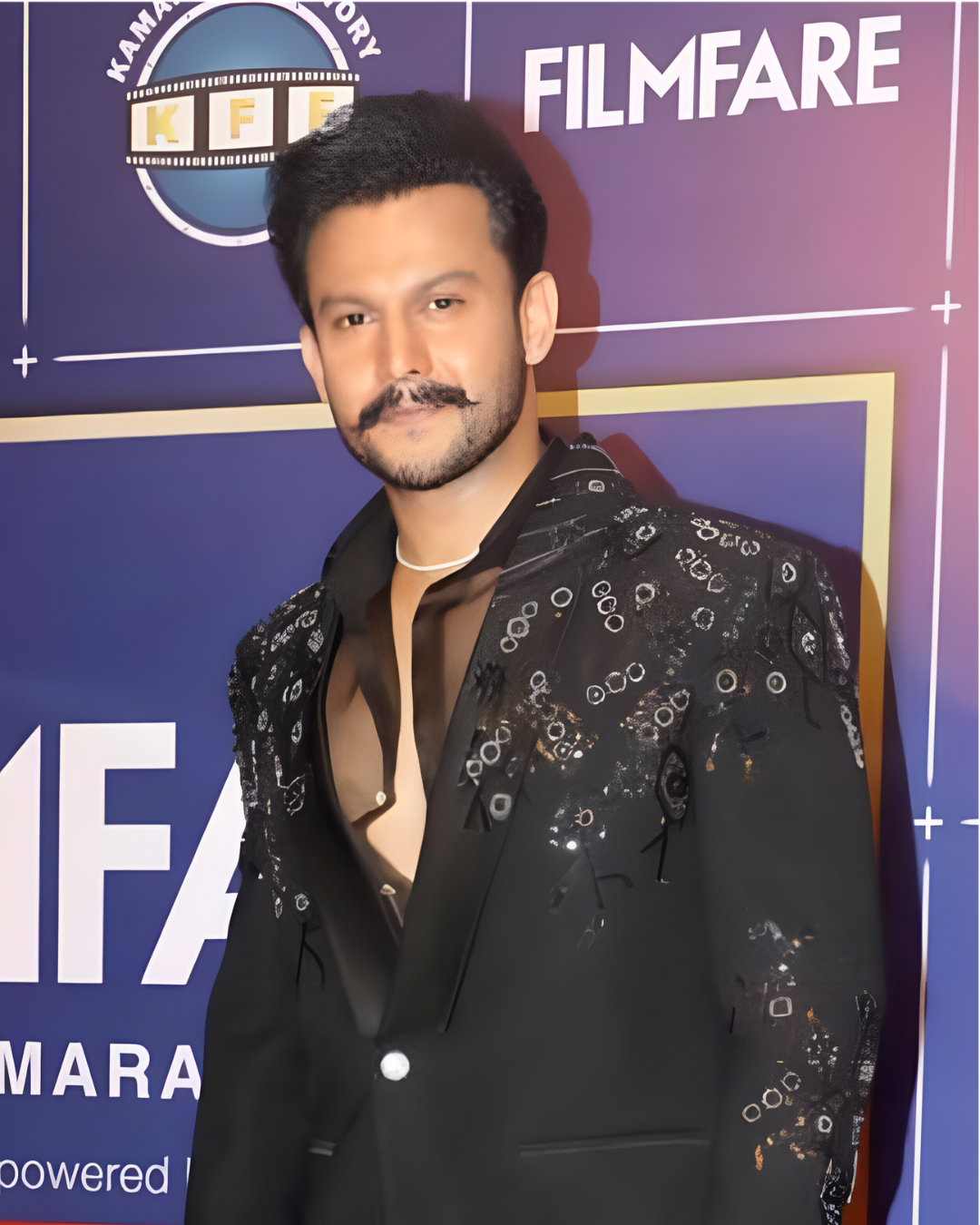
(left to right) Subodh Bhave, Ankush Chaudhari, Swapnil Joshi, Siddharth Jadhav and Adinath Kothare

2020s century stars
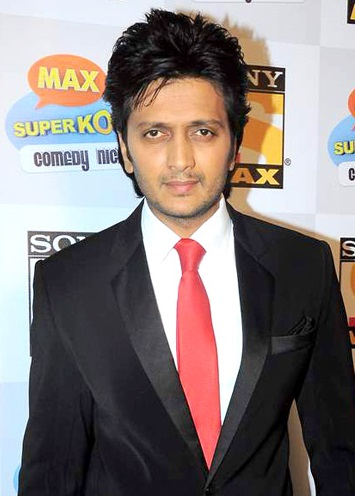
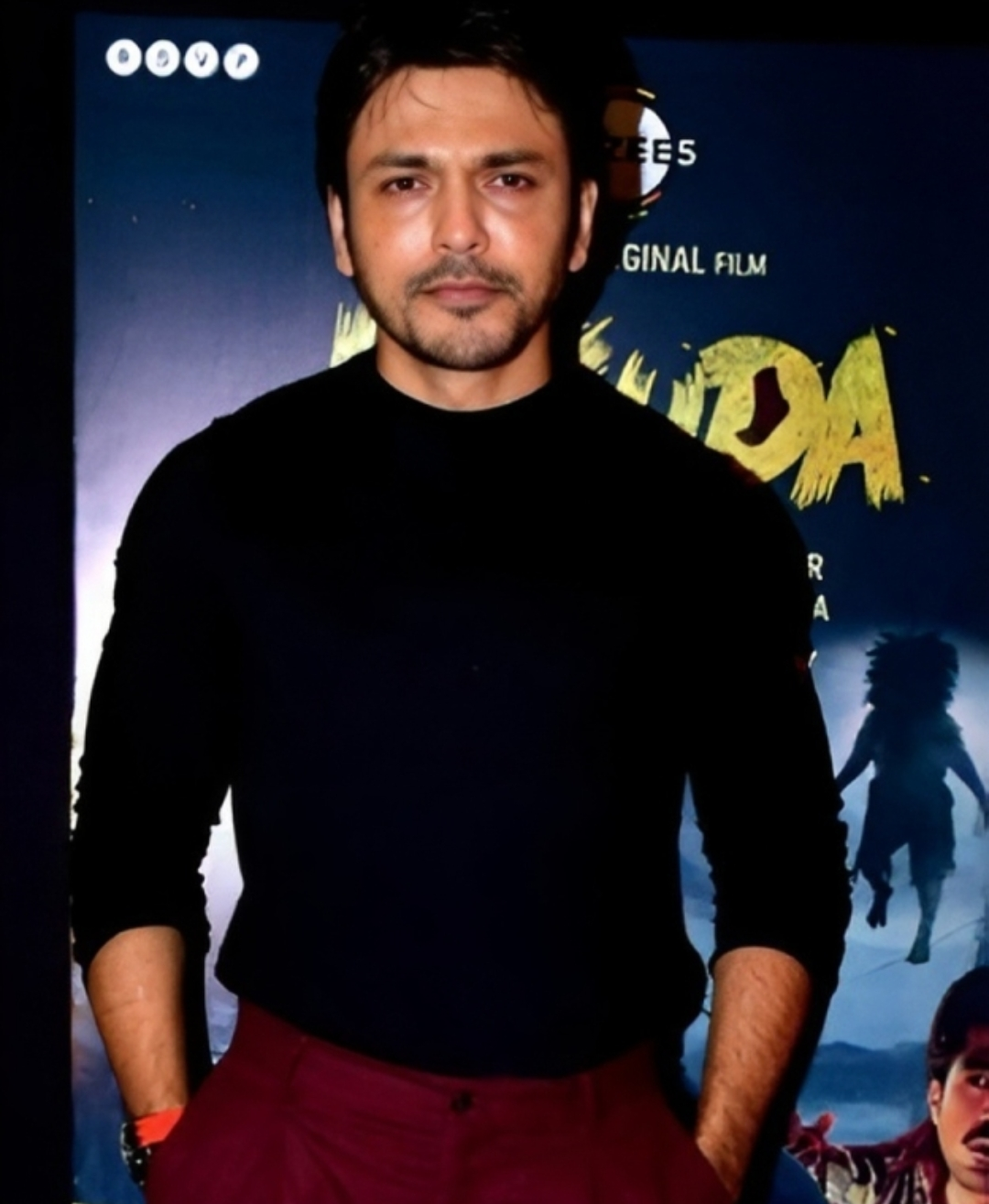
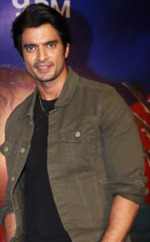
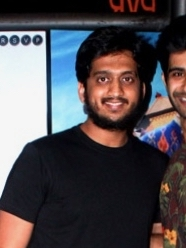
(left to right) Riteish Deshmukh, Lalit Prabhakar, Gashmeer Mahajani, Siddharth Chandekar and Amey Wagh

The following is a list of Indian male actors who have worked in Hindi cinema, the commercial Hindi-language film industry based chiefly in Mumbai.

Actors are listed alphabetically by given name.

== A ==
- Abhinay Berde
- Abhijeet Chavan
- Abhijeet Khandkekar
- Adinath Kothare
- Ajay Purkar
- Ajinkya Deo
- Akash Thosar
- Alok Rajwade
- Amey Wagh
- Amol Palekar
- Anand Abhyankar
- Anand Kale
- Aniket Vishwasrao
- Ankit Mohan
- Ankush Chaudhari
- Anshuman Joshi
- Anshuman Vichare
- Arun Nalawade
- Arun Sarnaik
- Ashok Saraf
- Ashok Shinde
- Ashutosh Gowariker
- Atul Kulkarni
- Atul Parchure

== B ==
Bhimrao Mude

- Baburao Pendharkar
- Bal Dhuri
- Bal Gandharva
- Bhagwan Dada
- Bhalchandra Kadam
- Bharat Ganeshpure
- Bharat Jadhav
- Bhushan Patil
- Bhushan Pradhan
- Bipin Varti

== C ==
- Chandrakant Gokhale
- Chandrakant Kulkarni
- Chandrakant Mandare
- Chinmay Mandlekar
- Chinmay Udgirkar

== D ==
- D. D. Dabke
- Dada Kondke
- Dada Salvi
- Dadasaheb Phalke
- Dilip Prabhavalkar
- Deepak Shirke
- Dhumal

== G ==
- Gajanan Jagirdar
- Ganpat Patil
- Gashmeer Mahajani
- Gaurav More
- Girish Karnad
- Girish Kulkarni
- Girish Oak
- Govindrao Tembe

== H ==
- Hardeek Joshi
- Harshad Atkari
- Hemant Dhome
- Hrishikesh Joshi

== J ==
- Jairam Kulkarni
- Jeetendra
- Jitendra Joshi

== K ==
- Kashinath Ghanekar
- Keshavrao Date
- Kishor Kadam
- Kishore Nandlaskar
- Kuldeep Pawar
- Kushal Badrike

== L ==
- Lalit Prabhakar
- Laxmikant Berde

== M ==
- Madhukar Toradmal
- Mahesh Kothare
- Mahesh Manjrekar
- Makarand Anaspure
- Makarand Deshpande
- Master Vithal
- Master Vinayak
- Milind Gawali
- Milind Gunaji
- Milind Shinde
- Milind Soman
- Mohan Agashe
- Mohan Choti
- Mohan Gokhale
- Mohan Joshi
- Manoj Joshi

== N ==
- Nagesh Bhonsle
- Nagraj Manjule
- Nana Patekar
- Narayan Hari Apte
- Navin Prabhakar
- Nikhil Chavan
- Nikhil Raut
- Nilesh Sabale
- Nitish Bharadwaj
- Nitish Chavan
- Nilu Phule

== O ==
- Om Bhutkar
- Omkar Bhojane
- Onkar Raut

== P ==
- P. Jairaj
- Piyush Ranade
- Prabhakar More
- Prabhakar Panshikar
- Pradeep Patwardhan
- Pranav Raorane
- Prasad Khandekar
- Prasad Oak
- Prashant Damle
- Prathamesh Parab
- Prithvik Pratap
- Parth Bhalerao
- Pravin Tarde
- Purushottam Laxman Deshpande
- Pushkar Jog
- Pushkar Shrotri
- Pushkaraj Chirputkar

== R ==
- Raja Gosavi
- Raja Paranjape
- Rajesh Shringarpure
- Ramchandra Purushottam Marathe
- Ramesh Deo
- Ramesh Bhatkar
- Raqesh Bapat
- Ravindra Mahajani
- Ravindra Mankani
- Rishi Saxena
- Riteish Deshmukh

== S ==
- Sachin Khedekar
- Sachin Pilgaonkar
- Sachit Patil
- Sadashiv Amrapurkar
- Saksham Kulkarni
- Sameer Dharmadhikari
- Samir Choughule
- Sambhaji Sasane
- Sandeep Kulkarni
- Sandeep Pathak
- Sanjay Jadhav
- Sanjay Mone
- Sanjay Narvekar
- Sanjay Shejwal
- Sanket Pathak
- Santosh Juvekar
- Satish Rajwade
- Sayaji Shinde
- Shahu Modak
- Shailesh Datar
- Sharad Kelkar
- Sharad Ponkshe
- Sharad Talwalkar
- Shashank Ketkar
- Shashank Shende
- Shivaji Satam
- Shreeram Lagoo
- Shreyas Talpade
- Shrikant Moghe
- Shrikant Yadav
- Siddhartha Jadhav
- Siddharth Chandekar
- Siddharth Menon
- Siddharth Ray
- Somnath Awghade
- Subodh Bhave
- Sudhir Joshi
- Sumeet Raghvan
- Sunil Barve
- Suraj Pawar
- Suryakant Mandhare
- Suvrat Joshi
- Suyash Tilak
- Suyog Gorhe
- Swapnil Rajshekhar
- Swwapnil Joshi

== T ==
- Tanaji Galgunde
- Tushar Dalvi

== U ==
- Uday Tikekar
- Umesh Kamat
- Upendra Limaye

== V ==
- V. Shantaram
- Vaibhav Tatwawadi
- Vaibhav Mangle
- Vasantrao Deshpande
- Vijay Chavan
- Vijay Patkar
- Viju Khote
- Vikram Gokhale
- Vinay Apte
- Vishal Nikam

== See also ==
- List of Indian film actors
- List of Indian film actresses
- List of Marathi film actresses
- List of actors
