= V. Shantaram Lifetime Achievement Award =

Cinema award in Maharashtra, India

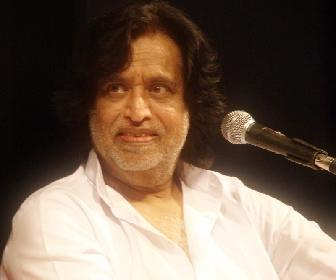
- The 2024 recipient: Hridaynath Mangeshkar
- Awarded for: "Outstanding contribution to the growth and development of Marathi cinema"
- Location: Maharashtra
- Country: India
- Presented by: Government of Maharashtra
- Rewards: Silver Medal; Trophy; Certificate; ₹1,000,000 (US$11,000)
- First award: 1993
- Final award: 2024
- Recent winner: Hridaynath Mangeshkar

Highlights
- Total awarded: 33
- First winner: Chandrakant Mandare

The V. Shantaram Lifetime Achievement Award is a lifetime achievement honor presented annually by the Government of Maharashtra, India. Established in 1994, the award is given by the Department of Cultural Affairs to individuals in recognition of their long-standing contributions to Marathi cinema. Recipients are selected by a committee comprising members from the Indian film industry.

The award includes a silver medal, a certificate, a trophy, and a cash prize of ₹1 million. It was instituted to commemorate filmmaker V. Shantaram (1901–1990), who played a notable role in the development of Indian cinema. The first recipient was actor Chandrakant Mandare, awarded in 1993 at the Maharashtra State Film Awards. As of 2024, a total of 33 individuals have received the award. Among those, Ravindra Mahajani is the only posthumous recipient. Mahajani's son, actor Gashmeer Mahajani, accepted the award on his behalf at the 57th Maharashtra State Film Awards ceremony. The most recent recipient of the award is veteran music director Hridaynath Mangeshkar who was honoured at 62nd Maharashtra State Film Awards.

== Recipients ==
List of award recipients by year
Year (Ceremony)	Image	Recipient	Work	Notes
1993		Chandrakant Mandare	Actor	He was known for performing in mythological and historical films, and his work spanned several decades in the Marathi film industry.
1994		Sudhir Phadke	Music director	Composed music for numerous Marathi and Hindi films and was particularly known for his work on the musical project Geet Ramayan, which became widely recognized in Maharashtra. His work is noted for its influence on Marathi film music and its role in shaping the musical landscape of the industry.
1995		Lalita Pawar	Actress	Known for her extensive career in Indian cinema, including notable contributions to Marathi films. She appeared in over 700 films across various languages and was known for portraying strong character roles, including antagonistic and maternal figures. Her performances were recognized for their consistency and impact over several decades in the film industry.
1996		Sulochana	Actress	Known for her longstanding contributions to Marathi cinema. She was known for her roles as a mother and supporting character in numerous films from the 1940s to the 1990s. Her performances were noted for their emotional depth and became a significant part of mainstream and regional Indian cinema.
1997	—	Dinkar D. Patil	Film Director	He was known for his work as a director and screenwriter in Marathi cinema, particularly for films that focused on rural life and social issues. His storytelling often reflected the experiences of everyday people, and he played a significant role in shaping socially conscious narratives in regional filmmaking.
1998		Sumati Gupte-Joglekar	Actress	She was known for her work as an actress in Marathi cinema and theatre. She was recognized for her performances in a variety of roles that showcased emotional depth and cultural nuance, contributing to the growth of Marathi performing arts during the mid-20th century.
1999	—	Vasant Painter	Film Director	Vasant Painter was known as a film director and art director in Marathi cinema, noted for his contributions to visually rich and socially relevant films.
2000	—	Ram Gabale	• Cinematographer • Film Director	He was known for his work as a cinematographer in Marathi and Hindi cinema, contributing to the visual style and technical development of Indian films over several decades.
2001		Chandrakant Gokhale	Actor	He was known for his work as an actor in Marathi theatre and cinema, with a career spanning several decades marked by performances in both dramatic and character roles.
2002		Jayshree Gadkar	Actress	She was known for her work as a leading actress in Marathi cinema, particularly during the 1950s to 1970s. She appeared in numerous mythological, historical, and social films, with notable works including Manini, Sangtye Aika, and Sawaal Majha Aika!. Her performances were recognized for her versatility and strong screen presence.
2003		Vanamala	Actress	She was known for her performances in Marathi and Hindi cinema, particularly for her role as the mother in the acclaimed film Shyamchi Aai (1953), which won the first National Film Award for Best Feature Film. She was recognized for her graceful screen presence and portrayals of dignified, emotionally nuanced characters.
2004	—	Annasaheb Deulgaonkar	Writer	Known for his contributions to Marathi cinema as a screenwriter. He played a key role in promoting and supporting regional films like Maherchi Sadi, Dhum Dhadaka & Lek Chalali Sasarla,helping to expand the reach of Marathi cinema across Maharashtra.
2005		Ashok Saraf	Actor	Known as “Mahanayak of Marathi Film Industry.” Best known for his role in shaping the modern Marathi comedy film genre. Over a career spanning nearly five decades and more than 250 Marathi films, he popularized comedy with impeccable timing and versatility across both Marathi and Hindi cinema. He was a central figure in the “comedy films wave.”
2006		Rajdutt	Film Director	Known for his work as a film director and screenwriter in Marathi cinema. He directed several critically acclaimed and commercially successful films, particularly in the 1970s and 1980s, often focusing on social and emotional themes.
2007		Ramesh Deo	Actor	He was a veteran actor, director, and producer in Marathi and Hindi cinema, known for his character roles and long-standing contribution to the film industry. He was often referred to as a versatile character actor due to his wide range of roles over six decades.
2007		Seema Deo	Actress	She was a respected actress in Marathi and Hindi cinema, known for her graceful screen presence and powerful performances that left a lasting impact on Indian film.
2008	—	Jagdish Khebudkar	• Writer • Lyricist	Renowned Marathi lyricist and poet, known for his prolific contribution to Marathi cinema and music. Over his career, he penned lyrics for more than 2,500 songs across around 300 films. His writing style blended simplicity with emotional depth, making his work resonate with audiences across generations.
2009		Asha Kale	Actress	She often portrayed strong female leads, such as devoted mothers, resilient wives, or women facing social and personal struggles. Her films typically explored relationships, societal norms, and human emotions, making her a prominent figure in serious, dramatic Marathi cinema.
2010		Jabbar Patel	Film Director	He known for directing socially and politically themed Marathi films and plays, blending artistic storytelling with issues like caste, power, and social justice. His notable works include Samna, Jait Re Jait, Sinhasan, Umbartha, and the biographical film Dr. Babasaheb Ambedkar.
2011		Leela Gandhi	Actress	Best known as a veteran Marathi actress and lāvṇī dance artist whose decades‑long career in cinema and stage brought widespread recognition to traditional Marathi folk art.
2012	—	Pandhari Juker	Make-up Artist	He was a celebrated makeup artist whose six-decade-long career in Hindi cinema left a profound mark on the industry.
2013	—	Uma Bhende	Actress	She often portrayed emotionally strong and graceful female characters, and her performances were rooted in traditional values and cultural narratives.
2014	—	Suryakant Lavande	Cinematographer	He was a distinguished cinematographer in Marathi cinema, celebrated for his work over six decades on visually impactful films like Samna, Sinhasan, Gammat Jammat, and Dhum Dhadaka.
2015	—	V. N. Mayekar	Film Editor	Often hailed as the “wizard of the scissors” for his masterful editing that added emotional depth and narrative precision to films.
2016		Vikram Gokhale	Actor	He was renowned as a consummate actor in Marathi theatre, films, and Hindi cinema, acclaimed for his dignified portrayals of authoritative figures and emotionally complex characters.
2017	—	Vijay Chavan	Actor	He was known as a highly versatile comic actor in Marathi theatre and cinema, famous for his over 350 film appearances and iconic stage role as the female lead in the comedy play Moruchi Mavshi.
2018		Sushama Shiromanee	Actress	She is known for her multifaceted career as an actress, producer, director, writer, and distributor in Marathi cinema. She gained particular recognition for directing and producing the Marathi "item‑song" driven films Bhingari, Fatakadi, Mosambi Narangi, Bhannat Bhanu, and Gulchhadi, often casting Bollywood stars to elevate Marathi cinema’s mass appeal.
2019	—	Ravindra Mahajani	Actor	Known for his striking leading-man presence in Marathi cinema during the 1970s and ’80s—often hailed as the industry’s equivalent of Bollywood’s Vinod Khanna—earning widespread recognition for roles in films like Zhunj, Aaram Haram Ahe, Devta, and Mumbaicha Faujdar.
2020		Usha Chavan	Actress	She known for her iconic roles in Marathi comedy films, especially alongside actor Dada Kondke, and for her work in emotional romantic and social dramas.
2021		Usha Naik	Actress	Best known as a seasoned Marathi actress whose career began as a background dancer in the 1970s and evolved into leading and character roles spanning over 250 films.
2022		Shivaji Satam	Actor	He has built a memorable career in both Marathi and Hindi cinema, appearing in acclaimed films such as Ek Hoti Vadi, Uttarayan, De Dhakka.
2023		Mahesh Manjrekar	• Film Director • Actor	He is a prominent figure in Marathi cinema, known for directing critically and commercially successful films like Astitva (2000), Mi Shivajiraje Bhosale Boltoy! (2009), Kaksparsh (2012), Natsamrat (2016), and Juna Furniture (2024).
2024		Hridaynath Mangeshkar	Music composer	He has made an enduring contribution to Marathi cinema through his exceptional work as a music composer. Renowned for blending Indian classical music with Marathi folk traditions and emotionally rich poetry, he elevated the artistic quality of Marathi film music. His memorable compositions for films such as Jait Re Jait, Sinhasan, Umbartha, Chaani, Ha Khel Savalyancha, Sarja and Nivdung are celebrated for their depth, originality, and cultural richness.
