= List of Marathi films of 1965 =

A list of films produced by the Marathi language film industry based in Maharashtra in the year 1965.

== 1965 Releases ==
A list of Marathi films released in 1965.

| Year | Film | Director | Cast | Release Date | Producer | Notes | Source |
|---|---|---|---|---|---|---|---|
| 1965 | Aai Kuna Mhanu Mi ? | Datta Mane | Jayshree Gadkar | | | | |
| 1965 | Lakshmi Aali Ghara | Madhav Shinde | | | | | |
| 1965 | Padchhaya | Raja Paranjape | Kashinath Ghanekar, Ratna, Ramesh Deo | | | | |
| 1965 | Sadhi Mansa | Bhalji Pendharkar | Jayshree Gadkar, Suryakant, Master Vithal | | | National Film Award for Best Feature Film in Marathi in 1965 | |
| 1965 | Yuge Yuge Me Vaat Pahili | C. Vishwanath | | | Babasaheb S. Fatehlal | National Film Award for Third Best Feature Film in Marathi in 1965 | |
| 1965 | Malhari Martand | Dinkar D. Patil | Suryakant, Jayshree Gadkar | | | | |
| 1965 | Kela Ishara Jaata Jaata | Anant Mane | Leela Gandhi, Usha Chavan, Arun Sarnaik | | | | |
| 1965 | Shevatcha Malusura | Vasant Joglekar | Uma, Ramesh Deo | | | | |
| 1965 | Yugo Yugo Mi Vaat Pahili | C. Vishwanath | Jayshree Gadkar, Gajanan Jagirdar | | | | |
| 1965 | Kadhi Karishi Lagna Maze | Yashwant Pethkar | | | | | |
| 1965 | Vavtal | Shantaram Athavale | Krishnakant Dalvi, Sulochana, Asha Potdar | | | | |
| 1965 | Chala Utha Lagna Kara | Prabhakar Naik | | | | | |
| 1965 | Sudharlelya Baika | Prabhakar Naik | Raja Gosavi, Sharad Talwalkar, Damuanna Malvankar | | | | |
| 1965 | Kamapurta Mama | Dinkar D. Patil | | | | | |
