= List of Marathi films of 1968 =

A list of films produced by the Marathi language film industry based in Maharashtra in the year 1968.

== 1968 releases ==
A list of Marathi films released in 1968.

Year	Film	Director	Cast	Release date	Producer	Notes	Source
1968	Ekti	Raja Thakur	Sulochana, Kashinath Ghanekar, Indumati Paingankar		G. Chaugle	National Film Award for Best Feature Film in Marathi in 1968	
1968	Jiwhala	Ram Gabale					
1968	Dhanya Te Santaji Dhanaji	Dinkar Patil	Chandrakant, Ganpat Patil, Lata Kale				
1968	Ek Mati Anek Nati	Krushna Patil	Madhu Bhosale, Anupama, Chandrakant				
1968	Aamhi Jato Amuchya Gava	Kamalakar Torne	Suryakant, Uma, Shrikant Moghe	9 August 1968	Everest Entertainment		
1968	Ek Gaav Bara Bhangadi	Anant Mane	Arun Sarnaik, Dada Salvi, Jayshree Gadkar				
1968	Dharmakanya	Madhav Shinde	Anupama, Chandrakant Gokhale, Ratnamala				
1968	Preet Shikva Mala	Bal Korde			Rajan Chitra		
1968	Yethe Shahane Rahtat	Dutta Keshav Kulkarni	Raja Paranjape, Raja Gosavi, Bharati Malwankar				
1968	Bai Mothi Bhagyachi	Datta Keshav	Madhu Apte, Master Bhagwan, Saroj Borkar		Maharashtra Films		
1968	Gharchi Rani	Rajdutt					
1968	Mangalsutra	Ashok Tate					
1968	Chhanda Preetichi	Madhav Bhoite					
1968	Khandobachi Aan	Prabhakar Manajirao Nayak					
1968	Dharmapatni	Govind B. Ghanekar					
