= Sulochana Chavan =

Indian singer (1933–2022)

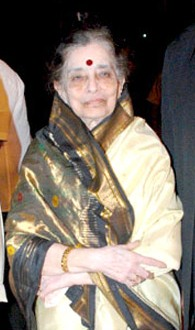
- Born: Sulochana Kadam; 13 March 1933; Fanas Wadi, Bombay, Bombay Presidency, British India
- Died: 10 December 2022 (aged 89); Girgaon, Mumbai, Maharashtra, India
- Occupation: Singer
- Spouse: Shyamrao Chavan

Sulochana Mahadev Kadam (13 March 1933 – 10 December 2022), better known as Sulochana Chavan, was an Indian singer who was known for her lavanis in Marathi.

Amongst various others, her famous lavanis included "Tuzhya Usala Laagal Kolha", "Padarawarti Jartaricha" both from film Malhari Martand (1965), "Solaawa Varees Dhokyacha", "Kasa Kay Patil Bara Hay Ka?" both from film Sawaal Majha Aika! (1964). She also recorded Hindi film and album songs.Her Hindi famous songs include "Chori Chori Aag Si Dil Mein lagake","Ulfat jisay kehtay hai. jeenay ka sahaara hai","Mousam aayaa hai rangeen", "woh aaye hain dil ko karar aa gaya hai".

== Career ==
Sulochana started her career at a very early age. At age six or seven, she took part in local dramas as Krishna in garbas. She then started acting in Gujarati theatre. She took lessons in Urdu language and also worked in Hindi-Urdu plays. She also worked in some Punjabi and Tamil films. She was introduced to the music director Shyambabu Pathak by makeup artist Shubam Dandekar. She then started going to V. Shantaram's Rajkamal Studios with her mother to take lessons in singing. At the age of 11, Chavan started singing professionally and sang in the movie Krishna Sudama (1947). She was credited as K. Sulochana after her maiden surname Kadam.

Her first lavani was "Naav Gaav Kashyala Pustat? Aaho Me Aahe Kolhapurchi, Mala Ho Mhantat Lavangi Mirchi" for the 1962 film Rangalya Raatri Asha where the music was composed by Vasant Pawar and the lyrics were penned by Jagdish Khebudkar. Chavan later went on to sing many lavanis through Marathi and Hindi films as well as doing stage performances.

== Personal life ==
Sulochana Kadam was born on 13 March 1933 in Fanas Wadi, Mumbai to Mahadev and Radhabai Kadam. She married Shamrao Chavan, director of the film Kalgitura (1955) whereupon she came to be known as Sulochana Chavan. She credited her husband with teaching her basics of pronunciation and stress.

Chavan published an autobiography 'Maaze Gaane Maaze Jagane' (lit. 'My Singing My Life').

Chavan died on 10 December 2022, at the age of 89.

== Awards and honours ==
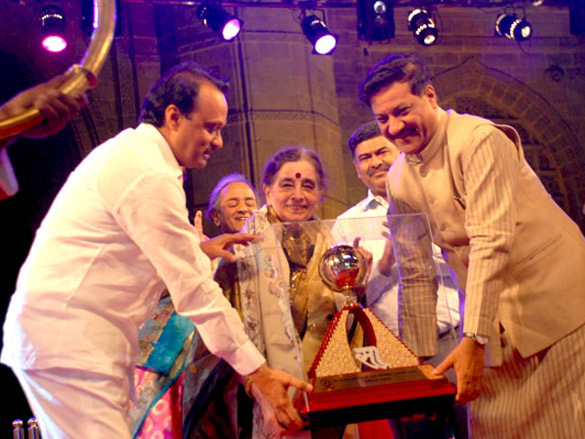
Chavan receives an award in 2013.

Chavan was awarded Padma Shri by the Government of India in March 2022. She has also been conferred the title of Lavani Samradhni (lit. 'Lavani Queen') for her singing contribution to the art genre. The title is conferred by the notable Marathi littérateur Pralhad Keshav Atre in 1952. She was honoured with the Lata Mangeshkar Award for the year 2010 instituted by Government of Maharashtra. In 2012, Sangeet Natak Akademi Award was conferred on her.

=== Other awards ===
- 2007 – Lokshahir Patthe Bapurao Puraskar instituted by Pune Municipal Corporation
- 2009 – Ram Kadam Puraskar
- 2011 – "Lavani Kalavant Puraskaar" presented by Sahakarmaharshi Shankarrao Mohite-Patil Samiti

== Discography ==
=== In films ===
Year	Song	Film	Music director	Lyricist	Notes
1962	"Mala Ho Mhantat Lavangi Mirchi"	Rangalya Raatri Asha	Vasant Pawar	Jagdish Khebudkar	
1964	"Kasa Kai Patil Bara Hai Ka?"	Sawaal Majha Aika!	Vasant Pawar	Jagdish Khebudkar	
1964	"Solaawa Varees Dhokyacha"	Sawaal Majha Aika!	Vasant Pawar	Jagdish Khebudkar	
1965	"Padarawarti Jartaricha Mor Naachara Hava"	Malhari Martand	Vasant Pawar	Ga Di Madgulkar	
1965	"Phad Saambhal Turyala Ga Aala"	Malhari Martand	Vasant Pawar	Ga Di Madgulkar	Based on raga Kalingada
1984	Navi navi navri mi	Gulchadi	Ram Laxman	Jagdish Khebudkar	

=== Singles ===
Year	Song	Music director	Lyricist
	"Kheltana Rang Bai Holicha"	Vitthal Chavan	Yadavrao Rokade
	"Kalidar Kapoori Paan"	Shrinivas Khale	Raja Badhe
	"Padala Piklay Aamba"	Tukaram Shinde	Tukaram Shinde
	"Aunda Lagin Karaycha"	Vishwasnath More	Ma Pa Bhave
	"Mazya Lagnacha Bendbaja Vajato"	Vitthal Shinde	Lokkavi Harendra Jadhav
