= Sangtye Aika =

- Theatrical release poster
- Directed by: Anant Mane
- Screenplay by: Vyankatesh Madgulkar
- Story by: G. G. Parkhi
- Produced by: Anant Mane
- Starring: Jayshree Gadkar; Dada Salvi; Suryakant; Chandrakant; Hansa Wadkar; Sulochana Latkar; Vasant Shinde
- Cinematography: E. Mohammed
- Edited by: Gangaram Mathaphode
- Music by: Vasant Pawar
- Production company: Chetana Chitra
- Release date: 22 May 1959
- Running time: 157 minutes
- Country: India
- Language: Marathi

Sangtye Aika (Note: Also spelled as Sangte Aika or Sangate Aika.) (transl. Listen, I'll Tell You) is an Indian Marathi-language drama film directed and produced by Anant Mane, from a screenplay by Vyankatesh Madgulkar, and featuring Jayshree Gadkar, Dada Salvi, Chandrakant, Suryakant, Hansa Wadkar, Sulochana Latkar and Vasant Shinde. The film was a huge commercial hit, and ran for over 131 weeks in Pune's Vijayanand Theatre and screened for almost two years across cities in Maharashtra, a record that was later broken by the Hindi film Sholay. It served as the inspiration for Wadkar's 1970 autobiography of the same name.

== Plot ==
In the rustic village of Rajuri, Sangate Aika spins a captivating tale of rivalry and retribution. At its core are two formidable figures: Chima, a spirited tamasha performer, and Mahadev Patil, the tyrannical landlord and village chief. Their feud takes root when Chima accuses Patil of her father's murder and his staunch defense of the oppressive village hierarchy. As Patil's power grows unchecked, he orchestrates heinous acts, including the murder of an innocent farmer and the rape of his wife, Hansa. Despite enduring unimaginable loss, Chima remains resolute. When Hansa's newborn daughter perishes, Salaram, once a feared dacoit, unexpectedly becomes her protector.

Their fates intertwine as Hansa's child finds sanctuary in Chima's care, setting the stage for a confrontation. Patil's facade crumbles and his son, Krishna, mirrors his father's dark deeds, while Chima returns to Rajuri, armed with damning revelations. In a climactic showdown, she exposes Patil's crimes before a stunned audience, including Krishna and Hansa. Tensions escalate as Patil confronts his adversaries with lethal intent. Yet, in a twist of fate, it is Salaram who meets a tragic end, sacrificing himself for those he once preyed upon.

In a poignant moment, Hansa extends forgiveness to Krishna, symbolised by a simple rakhi. As the dust settles on Rajuri's tumultuous saga, Sangtye Aika delivers a powerful message of resilience and redemption, where the bonds of kinship and the pursuit of justice prevail over darkness.

== Cast ==
- Jayshree Gadkar as Hansa, Patil's daughter
- Suryakant as Krishna Patil
- Dada Salvi as Mahadev Patil
- Chandrakant as Sakharam Shinde
- Sulochana Latkar Hansa, Sakharam's wife
- Hansa Wadkar as Chima (Tamasha dancer–Tamasgirin)
- Vasant Shinde as Piraji
- Pushpa Rane as Patlinbai

== Production ==
The film was filmed at Prabhat Film Company in Pune and was completed in only three months.

== Release and reception ==
The film was released in 1959 in Maharashtra, and became a major commercial success. Sangte Aika set a record by continuous screenings for almost 175 weeks. As per Mandar Lawte, the movie ran for 175 weeks in Aryan theater at Babu Genu Chowk in Pune. The theater no longer exists due to modernization It also made a lasting impression on Marathi literature and theatre. Narwekar stated that Shikleli Baiko and Sangte Aika both reaffirmed the notion that the new Marathi film audience was concentrated in rural regions and was drawn to movies with a similar theme. Those who made films against this backdrop did so out of a natural desire to distance themselves from the limited urban Marathi film audience. Prior to independence, Marathi films were praised for their unique substance, and in light of this appreciation, Hindi versions were made shortly after.

== Impact ==
The number of tamasha films steadily grew between 1959 and 1972. Sangtye Aika spent nearly 140–240 weeks in theaters. Production figures for the tamasha film increased starting in 1961. As a result, there were two in 1961 (Shahir Parshuram and Rangapanchami), two in 1964 (Sawaal Majha Aika! and Sundara Mana Madhye Bharli), three in 1967, and five in 1970. The tamasha gained popularity in rural performing circuits with a cinematic rendition. As it was eventually performed in tiny towns and villages, this also had an impact on its performance elements. A form that the film industry had successfully taken was being influenced in the opposite way. It led to an odd historical turnabout for the tamasha as a folk art form and the film industry.

== Soundtrack ==
Sangtye Aika

Soundtrack album by Vasant Pawar
- Released: 1959
- Genre: Feature film soundtrack
- Length: 35:33
- Language: Marathi
- Label: Saregama India Limited

The music was composed by Vasant Pawar and the songs are sung by Asha Bhosle, Vitthal Shinde, Madhubala Jhaveri, and Kumud Pendekar, while the lyrics were provided by G. D. Madgulkar. The lavani song "Bugadi Majhi Sandli Ga" sung by Asha Bhosle and picturised on Jayshree Gadkar became very popular at that time.

=== Track listing ===
No.	Title	Singer(s)	Length
1	"Bugadi Majhi Sandali Ga"	Asha Bhosle	3:28
2	"Chandra Ugavato"	Asha Bhosle, Vitthal Shinde	5:52
3	"Kaal Sari Raat"	Madhubala Jhaveri	3:25
4	"Ram Ram Ghya"	Asha Bhosle	3:28
5	"Zali Bhali Pahat"	Asha Bhosle	3:44
6	"Dhumya Rishi Sangat Ase"	Madhubala Jhaveri	2:34
7	"Sanga Hya Vedila"	Vitthal Shinde, Kumudini Pednekar	3:18
8	"Are Are Nandyacha Pora"	Madhubala Jhaveri, Vitthal Shinde	3:16
9	"Paatlachi Por"	Madhubala Jhaveri	6:30
