= Manini (1961 film) =

- Theatrical release poster
- Directed by: Anant Mane
- Screenplay by: Vyankatesh Madgulkar
- Story by: Mahadevshastri Joshi
- Produced by: D. J. Nayak; E. Mohammad
- Starring: Jayshree Gadkar; Chandrakant Gokhale; Hansa Wadkar; Indira Chitnis; Ramesh Deo; Vasant Shinde; Sharad Talwalkar
- Cinematography: V. Bargir
- Edited by: Gangaram Mathaphode
- Music by: Vasant Pawar
- Production company: Kala Chitra
- Release date: 25 January 1961
- Running time: 127 minutes
- Country: India
- Language: Marathi

Manini (transl. Proud woman) is a 1961 Indian Marathi-language family drama film directed by Anant Mane and produced by Kala Chitra. The film stars Jayshree Gadkar, Chandrakant Gokhale, Hansa Wadkar, Indira Chitnis, Ramesh Deo, Vasant Shinde, and Sharad Talwalkar. At the 9th National Film Awards Manini Won National Film Award for Best Marathi Feature Film.

Gadkar's portrayal as a modest and exemplary daughter-in-law assists the film in transplanting a neo-traditional set of values into the emerging urban middle class context.

== Plot ==
Malati defies her parents' wishes and marries Madhav, despite their differing circumstances. Battling bouts of depression while traversing life's journey, she occasionally finds solace. When her parents visit, Annasaheb derides her choices, urging her to leave with him, but she stands her ground. Despite receiving invitations to her sister's weddings, Malati and Madhav depart their home with heavy hearts, never to return. Ignoring subsequent invitations, they remain resolute. Malati lives out her days with unwavering determination.

== Cast ==
- Jayashree Gadkar as Malati
- Chandrakant Gokhale as Madhav
- Indira Chitnis as Malati's mother
- Ramesh Deo
- Vasant Shinde as Malati's father
- Sharad Talwalkar
- Hansa Wadkar
- Shanta Tambe
- Dada Salvi
- Appa Joshi
- Ratnamala

== Production ==
The production of the film was completed at Shalini Cinetone in Kolhapur.

== Remakes ==
The film was adapted in Gujarati as Maa Dikri directed by Krishnakant.

== Soundtrack ==
Manini

Soundtrack album by Vasant Pawar
- Released: 1961
- Genre: Feature film soundtrack
- Length: 19:54
- Language: Marathi
- Label: Saregama

Official audio
- Manini - Full Album on YouTube

All music is composed by Vasant Pawar.

Track listing
No.	Title	Lyrics	Singer (s)	Length
1.	"Are Sansar Sansar"	Bahinabai Chaudhari	Suman Kalyanpur	3:46
2.	"Are Khopya Madhi Khopa"	Bahinabai Chaudhari	Asha Bhosale	3:01
3.	"Dhartichya Khushimadhy"	Bahinabai Chaudhari, G. D. Madgulkar	Suman Kalyanpur	3:07
4.	"Vanvaas Ha Sukhacha"	G. D. Madgulkar	Asha Bhosale	3:31
5.	"Man Vadhay Vadhay"	Bahinabai Chaudhari	Asha Bhosale	3:22
6.	"Uma Mhane Yadyni Maze"	G. D. Madgulkar	Suman Kalyanpur, Chorus	3:10
Total length:				19:54
