= Bangarwadi =

- Poster of the film Bangarwadi
- Directed by: Amol Palekar
- Written by: Vyankatesh Madgulkar (screenplay and dialogues)
- Produced by: National Film Development Corporation of India; Doordarshan
- Starring: Chandrakant Kulkarni; Chandrakant Mandare; Adhishree Atre; Nandu Madhav; Sunil Ranade; Upendra Limaye
- Cinematography: Debu Deodhar
- Edited by: Waman Bhosale
- Music by: Vanraj Bhatia
- Release date: 1995
- Running time: 124 mins
- Country: India
- Language: Marathi

Bangarwadi (Marathi: बनगरवाडी) is a 1995 Indian Marathi film directed by Amol Palekar. It is based on an eponymous novel written by Vyankatesh Madgulkar and published in 1955. It is the story of a young school teacher and his experiences in a small village of shepherds in the princely state of Aundh during the 1940s.

== Plot ==
The story begins with a young school teacher, played by Chandrakant Kulkarni, walking alone towards a village called Bangarwadi, across a deserted landscape. When he reaches Bangarwadi, he finds that the school has shut down and that the people of the village are reluctant to send their children to school. With the support of the Karbhari (the village head), the teacher convinces the villagers to send their children to school. He runs the school for the next few months and helps the illiterate and the needy in the village, which sometimes lands him into trouble. Soon, he convinces the villagers to set up a gymnasium through community participation. He invites the king of the state, Pant Pratinidhi for its inauguration. The sudden death of the village head leaves the village and the teacher shocked. Then comes prolonged drought. The teacher tries his best to get help from the government, writing frequent letters describing the graveness of situation, but he gets no response. Drought forces the people of Bangarwadi to abandon the village, leaving the school teacher alone and with no students.

== Cast ==
- Chandrakant Kulkarni as the school teacher
- Chandrakant Mandare as Karbhari (the village head)
- Adhishree Atre as Anji
- Nandu Madhav as Ananda Ramoshi
- Sunil Ranade as Aayub
- Nagesh Bhonsle as Daddu Baltya
- Hiralal Jain as Kakabu
- Kishor Kadam as Rama
- Upendra Limaye as Sheku
- Ravi Kale

== Reception ==
Reviewing the film at the Indian Panorama section of the International Film Festival of India, S. R. Ashok Kumar of The Hindu wrote that "If only Amol Palekar had concentrated a little more on the screenplay and editing it would have become a memorable movie".

== Awards ==
- National Award for the best Feature Film in Marathi, 1996
- Kalnirnaya Award Best Film, 1997
- Filmfare Award for Best Film and Direction, 1997
- Maharashtra state awards in five categories, 1996
- Screen Awards - Best Actress

=== Film festivals ===
Bangarwadi was screened at several international film festivals:

- Karlovy Vary International Film Festival, 1996
- Birmingham International Film Festival, 1996
- London Film Festival, the UK, 1996
- 15th FAJR International Film Festival, Iran, 1997
- Cairo International Film Festival, Egypt, 1996
- Bogota International Film Festival, Colombia, 1996
- Sarajevo Film Festival, Prague 1996
