= Mohityanchi Manjula =

- Poster
- Directed by: Bhalji Pendharkar
- Written by: Bhalji Pendharkar
- Produced by: Bhalji Pendharkar
- Starring: Suryakant; Jayshree Gadkar; Chandrakant; Baburao Pendharkar
- Cinematography: Arvind Laad
- Edited by: Baburao Bhosale
- Music by: Anandghan
- Production companies: Jay Bhavani Chittra; Jaiprabha Studio
- Release date: 1 May 1963
- Country: India
- Language: Marathi

Mohityanchi Manjula (transl. Manjula of the Mohite Family) is a 1963 Indian Marathi-language historical fiction film directed by Bhalji Pendharkar who also provided the story, screenplay and dialougues and produced by Jay Bhavani Chitra, the film stars Suryakant, Jayshree Gadkar, Chandrakant, Baburao Pendharkar in the pivotal roles. The film plot follows a fictional story inspired by the life of Bahirji Naik, a secret agent of Chhatrapati Shivaji.

The film was released on 1 May 1963.

== Plot ==
Mohityanchi Manjula is a fictional love story set in Maharashtra during the time of Chhatrapati Shivaji (Chandrakant Mandare), a great warrior known for his bravery. The main characters are Bahirji Naik (Suryakant Mandhare), a spy who works for Shivaji and a fictional girl named Manjula (Jayshree Gadkar) from the noble Mohite family. The story connects two ideas – protecting women’s honor and standing up for Hindu pride against the Mughal rule. Kedarji (Raja Patwardhan), a leader from the More clan, tries to ruin Manjula’s honor because he is against Shivaji's plans. Manjula declares that she wants to marry a soldier from Shivaji’s army, not a nobleman like Kedarji. The story begins with an anthem that praises Maharashtra, followed by Chandra Rao More (Jaishankar Danve), who shelters Rangu Vakade (Barchi Bahaddar), a criminal sentenced to death by Shivaji for assaulting a woman. At the festival of God Bhairoba in Bhairevadi, Kedarji’s men misbehave with women and Manjula bravely fights back by hitting Ganya (Chittaranjan Kolhatkar) with a whip. Kedarji insults her, comparing her to his mare, but she quickly responds by calling him a bullock. Later, Manjula defeats Kedarji’s fighter in a fencing contest, making him even angrier. Kedarji then plots to kidnap her, but an actor (Suryakant Mandhare), who is secretly Bahirji, joins Kedarji’s team and overhears this plan. Meanwhile, Manjula’s aunt (Indira Chitnis) and friend Hamsa (Shanta Tambe) warn her to be careful, but Manjula says she will only change for a true man, not someone like Kedarji. Kedarji tries to force Manjula into marrying him by sending kidnappers to her house, but Bahirji, now in disguise as Daulat Jadhav, helps her fight back. Kedarji then tries another trick by planning to marry her off to a servant pretending to be a soldier. However, Manjula refuses. Bahirji, still disguised as Sarja, helps to stop Kedarji's plans. Manjula starts to feel suspicious of Sarja, wondering why a Shivaji officer is behaving like a performer. Meanwhile, Bahirji continues to send reports to Shivaji, even as Shivaji scolds him for getting distracted from his mission. As Bahirjí gets closer to taking down the More clan, he kills Rangu, shocking everyone. Kedarji tries to convince Manjula that her husband is just a servant, but she still supports him, believing he is a brave soldier. During the final battle, when Shivaji's army attacks the fort, Manjula helps by firing a shot that allows them to win. Later, Bahirji finally reveals his true identity to Manjula. Shivaji himself arrives to thank Manjula for her courage and declares her as his sister, honoring her bravery and loyalty.

== Cast ==
- Suryakant as Bahirji Naik
- Jayshree Gadkar as Manjula
- Chandrakant as Chatrapati Shivaji
- Raja Patwardhan as Kedarji
- Baburao Pendharkar as Hanumant
- Jaishankar Danve as Chandra Rao More
- Chittaranjan Kolhatkar as Ganya
- Shanta Tambe as Hamsa
- Raja Mayekar as Manjula's aunt
- Vasant Shinde
- Master Vithal
- Indira Chitnis
- Shankar Kulkarni

== Production ==
The production work of the film is completed at the Jayprabha Studio in Kolhapur.

== Release ==
The film was released on 1 May 1963, coinciding with Maharashtra Day. It was the second film of 1963 to become reasonably popular after Molkarin.

== Soundtrack ==
Mohityanchi Manjula

Soundtrack album by Anandghan
- Released: 1963
- Genre: Feature film soundtrack
- Length: 14:02
- Language: Marathi
- Label: Saregama India limited

Official audio
- Mohityanchi Manjula - Full Album on YouTube

The music is composed by Anandghan (pseudonym used by Lata Mangeshkar) who also sung the songs along with her siblings Asha Bhosle, Usha Mangeshkar, and Hridaynath Mangeshkar. Lata Mangeshkar also composed music for Ram Ram Pavhana (1960), Maratha Titka Melvava (1963), Sadhi Mansa (1965), Tambadi Mati (1969) under the pseudonym Anandghan. The lyrics were provided by Shanta Shelke and Jagdish Khebudkar while sound design is handled by Kaushik.

All music is composed by Anandghan.

Track listing
No.	Title	Lyrics	Singer(s)	Length
1.	"Bai Bai Manmoracha"	Jagdish Khebudkar	Lata Mangeshkar	3:22
2.	"Zala Sakharpuda - 1963"	Jagdish Khebudkar	Lata Mangeshkar, Usha Mangeshkar, Chorus	3:31
3.	"Nilya Abhali"	Jagdish Khebudkar	Lata Mangeshkar	3:04
4.	"Son Sakali Sarja"	Shanta Shelke	Lata Mangeshkar	3:34
Total length:				14:02
