= Malhari Martand =

- Directed by: Dinkar D. Patil
- Written by: Dinkar D. Patil
- Produced by: Ram Devtale
- Starring: Jayshree Gadkar; Suryakant Mandhare; Uma Bhende; Dada Salvi; Ganpat Patil
- Cinematography: E. Muhammad
- Edited by: Gangaram Mathphod
- Music by: Vasant Pawar
- Production company: Vilas Chitra
- Release date: 25 March 1965
- Running time: 135 minutes
- Country: India
- Language: Marathi

Malhari Martand is a 1965 Indian Marathi- language family drama directed by Dinkar D. Patil and produced by Vilas Chitra. The film stars Jayshree Gadkar, Suryakant Mandhare, Dada Salvi, Uma Bhende, Ganpat Patil, Indira Chitnis, and Shanta Tambe in lead roles. The film also won Best Actor in 5th Maharashtra State Film Awards. This film has many popular songs sung by Sulochana Chavan.

== Plot ==
Gulab (Suryakant Mandhare), the son of a wealthy landowner from the village of Devgaon in Maharashtra, wishes to marry a woman who is lively and free-spirited. He falls in love with Bakula (Jayshree Gadkar), a smart and talented Tamasha dancer. However, his parents strongly oppose the relationship and persuade him to marry Kamala (Uma Bhende) instead, believing that a respectable woman is better suited to support a family and uphold social values. Meanwhile, Gulab's cousin Balya (Rajshekhar), frustrated after losing a legal dispute over family property, turns his attention towards Bakula and attempts to take advantage of her situation. Determined to protect her dignity, Gulab takes a stand against him. As the story unfolds, Bakula fights for her self-respect, while Kamala gradually comes to terms with the realities of her marriage and her place within the family.

== Cast ==
- Jayshree Gadkar as Bakula Jejurikarin
- Suryakant Mandhare as Gulabrao
- Uma Bhende as Kamala
- Dada Salvi as Daji Patil
- Indira Chitnis as Gulab's mother
- Rajshekhar as Balasaheb
- Vasant Shinde
- Shanta Tambe

== Soundtrack ==
Malhari Martand

Soundtrack album by Vasant Pawar
- Released: 1965
- Genre: Feature film soundtrack
- Length: 35:03
- Language: Marathi
- Label: Saregama

All music is composed by Vasant Pawar

Track listing
No.	Title	Lyrics	Singer (s)	Length
1.	"Phad Sambhal Turyala Ga"	G. D. Madgulkar	Sulochana Chavan	3:57
2.	"Padravarti Jartaricha Mor"	G. D. Madgulkar	Sulochana Chavan	3:54
3.	"Zara Priticha Ka Asa"	G. D. Madgulkar	Suman Kalyanpur	3:08
4.	"Ambika Maya Jagdishwari"	G. D. Madgulkar	Suman Kalyanpur	3:36
5.	"Ughadle Ek Chandani Dwar"	G. D. Madgulkar	Suman Kalyanpur	3:35
Total length:				35:03
