= Chhatrapati Shivaji (1952 film) =

Indian historical drama film

- VCD cover
- Directed by: Bhalji Pendharkar
- Produced by: Bhalji Pendharkar
- Starring: Chandrakant; Parshwanath Yeshwant Alteka; Prithviraj Kapoor; Gajanan Jagirdar; Leela; Ranjana; Lalita Pawar
- Cinematography: G. Shinde
- Edited by: B. Bhosale
- Music by: C. Ramchandra
- Production company: Prabhakar Chitra
- Release date: 1952
- Running time: 170 minutes
- Country: India
- Languages: Marathi; Hindi

Chhatrapati Shivaji is a 1952 Indian historical drama film directed and produced by Bhalji Pendharkar. The film chronicles key events in the life of Shivaji Maharaj, the founder of the Maratha Empire, from his birth to his coronation as "Chhatrapati" in 1674. Released in both Marathi and Hindi, the film features an ensemble cast, including Chandrakant as Shivaji, Parshwanath Yeshwant Altekar, Prithviraj Kapoor, Gajanan Jagirdar, Leela, Ranjana, Lalita Pawar, and a rare acting appearance by legendary playback singer Lata Mangeshkar. The music was composed by C. Ramchandra, with lyrics by Shailendra.

== Plot ==
The film traces the life of Chhatrapati Shivaji Maharaj (1630–1680), depicting his journey from a young warrior to the founder of the Maratha Empire. It highlights significant events, including his early conquests, battles against regional powers, and his eventual coronation as "Chhatrapati," marking the establishment of a sovereign Maratha state. The narrative emphasizes Shivaji's military strategies, leadership, and commitment to Swarajya (self-rule), portraying him as a symbol of resistance against oppression. Specific plot details, such as key battles or interactions with historical figures like Raja Jaisingh (played by Altekar in the Marathi version and Kapoor in the Hindi version), are included to reflect historical accuracy while dramatizing Shivaji's legacy.

== Cast ==
- Chandrakant as Chhatrapati Shivaji Maharaj
- Parshwanath Yeshwant Altekar as Raja Jaisingh (Marathi version)
- Prithviraj Kapoor as Raja Jaisingh (Hindi version)
- Gajanan Jagirdar as Aurangzeb
- Leela Chandragiri
- Shakuntala
- Lalita Pawar
- Lata Mangeshkar
- Baburao Pendharkar
- Jaishankar
- Ratnamala
- Vasant Thengdi
- Ranjana
- Suresh Nath
- Vanamala
- Vasantrao Pahalwan
- Master Vithal
- Krishnarao Chonkar
- Jaishankar Danve
- Takalkar
- Varne
- Shankar Kulkarni
- Shankarrao Bhosale
- Vinay Kale
- Ganpat Patil

== Production ==
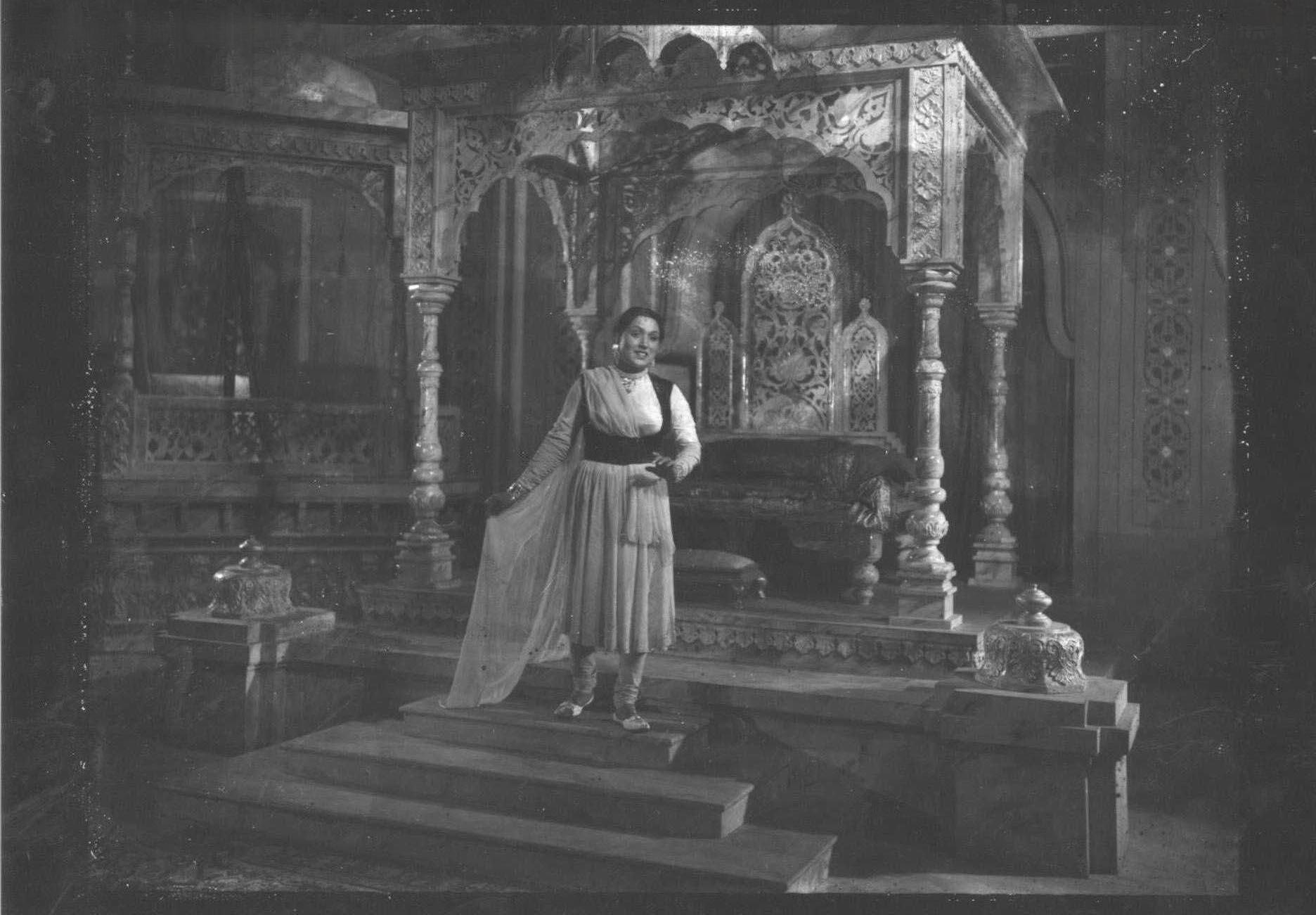
A still from the film.

Chhatrapati Shivaji was produced under the banner of Prabhakar Pictures, with Bhalji Pendharkar serving as both director and producer. The film was shot in both Marathi and Hindi. The casting of Lata Mangeshkar, primarily known as a playback singer, marking one of her rare on-screen appearances. The film's music was composed by C. Ramchandra, a prominent composer of the era, with lyrics penned by Shailendra.

== Music ==
The soundtrack was composed by C. Ramchandra, with lyrics by Shailendra. The film features songs that complement its historical and patriotic themes.

== Legacy ==
Chhatrapati Shivaji is regarded as one of the earliest cinematic portrayals of Shivaji. Chandrakant's portrayal of Chhatrapati Shivaji was widely acclaimed and remains iconic in Marathi cinema.

== See also ==
- Har Har Mahadev
- Fatteshikast
- Tanhaji: The Unsung Warrior
