= Fanas Wadi =

Coordinates: 18.951811°N 72.825309°E

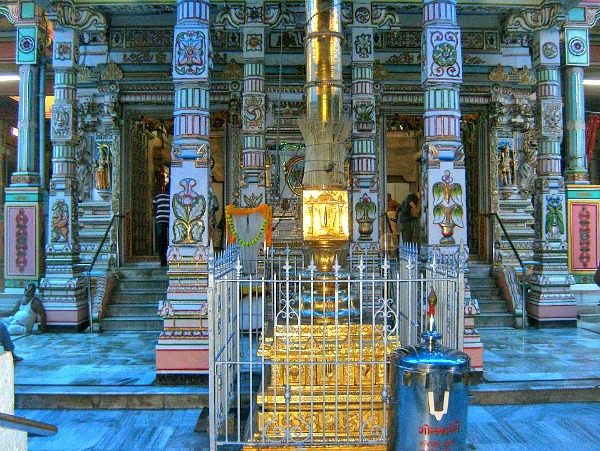
Shri.Balaji temple. 2014

Fanas Wadi / Phanaswadi is a neighbourhood in Kalbadevi, South Mumbai.

It is known for its temple devoted to Lord Venkateshwara. The local folks call this temple as 'Lord Balaji mandir'. The name fanas is Marathi for jackfruit, probably pointing to a time when the trees grew abundantly here. The temple at Fanaswadi, Mumbai dedicated to the Lord of the Seven Hills Sri Venkateshwara was consecrated on 10 June 1927.

== Consecration and Dravidian style of architecture ==
For the consecration of the temple, one of the Panch Beras, which was in Puja in Yathok thakari Devasthanam(Kanchi), one of the 108 Divya Desas sung by the Alvars and also Sri Sudarsana from Tirunangur Devastanams, was brought from Kanchi. Both the idols were brought to Mumbai in a special palanquin on foot, performing Panchakala Aradhana on the entire route, with all the paraphernalia.

The temple has been designed in Dravidian style, strictly according to Silpa Sastra and every stone laid for raising the towers was measured and fitted in as per architectural shastras.

== Gopuram ==
The massive Gopuram or tower which is a replica of the Dravidian architecture is visible from quite a distance. The temple consists of two prakarars (enclosures). There is a Vimana over the sanctum sanctorum. There is the Dvajastambha(Flag-Staff) covered with gold plates and Bali Peetam in front of it.

== Idols-caturvimsati murtis ==
In the outer side of the first prakara wall one can find the carvings of the images of all the Caturvimsati Murtis (the 24 different aspects of the Lord Narayan or Vishnu) according to their description given in the Pancaratra-agamas. Though most of the murtis have four arms holding weapons and ornaments like the Sankha, Chakra, Gada and Padma, the difference in the murtis is only in the positions of the weapons and ornaments found in their arms. One can make out the difference among them by keen observation of the sculpture. This piece of sculpture is very rare since though these 24 murtis are found in many temples one can see all of them together in this temple and so it enables one to observe all aspects of the chaturvimsati murtis for deep study or meditation

== To reach this temple ==
Marine Lines railway station (W.R), is very near by Kalbadevi road. One can reach the mandir with minimum taxi fare. BEST buses are available to reach Kalbadevi road, from various parts of the metropolis.
