= Sawaal Majha Aika! =

- DVD Cover
- Directed by: Anant Mane
- Written by: Ranjit Desai (screenplay & dialogues)
- Produced by: Anant Mane
- Starring: Jayshree Gadkar; Arun Sarnaik
- Music by: Vasant Pawar
- Release date: 7 October 1964
- Running time: 138 mins
- Country: India
- Language: Marathi

Sawaal Majha Aika! (transl. Listen to My Question!) is a 1964 Marathi-language Indian musical film. The film is produced and directed by Anant Govind Mane under his banner "Chetana Chitra". The storyline of the film is based on a traditional theatre form called Tamasha. The film has many popular songs sung by Sulochana Chavan.

The film won the Certificate of Merit for the Third Best Feature Film at the 12th National Film Awards ceremony held on 31 May 1965. Anant Mane's previous two film Dhakti Jau (1958) and Manini (1961) also won National Film Awards at the 6th and 9th ceremony respectively.

== Plot ==
Jyotiba, a tamasha conductor of a popular group, enters a musical quiz competition against another group led by Raghoo. The loser would have to wear lugada for the rest of his life. Jyotiba loses the competition and has to face humiliation due to which he and his wife succumb to death. To avenge the death of her parents, their little daughter Anu decides to excel in the art form. She takes the vow to defeat Raghoo and make him wear lugada. Anu trains in dance and singing under the guidance of Kulkarni master. After 12 years, she grows into a young, attractive woman (Jayshree Gadkar) and finally decides to enter the competition with her troupe.

Jayawanta (Arun Sarnaik), who is the star of another competitor group starts falling for her. Impressed by his poetry, Anu hires him to be part of her troupe. But it turns out that Jayawanta is Raghoo's son. With her broken heart, Anu decides to give up on the competition. But she is encouraged by her aunt to not give up. She hence stands up again. Other troupe members of Jayawanta take this as a threat for their own troupe. One night in the middle of the performance, they break the lights in the theatre and kidnap Anu in the darkness. Anu is then made to believe that it was Jayawanta himself who had sent men to do this. But then Raghoo comes and frees her.

A day before the competition, Anu meets her teacher to take his blessing. Kulkarni master wishes her good luck to win. Raghoo who is also a close friend of Kulkarni master becomes disappointed in master for this. But master explains to him how the win is important for Anu. After a few rounds of Question-Answer in the competition Anu is not able to give answer to one of the questions asked by Jayawanta. She hence requests time for thinking and answer him the next evening. Raghoo sends the answer to the question without letting Anu know of who sent it. Anu, on the next day, defeats Jayawanta and calls his father Raghoo to wear lugada. Raghoo accepts his defeat. But Anu then finds out of his greatness of how he actually told her the answer and saved her from further humiliation. Anu begs sorry towards Raghoo and then Jayawanta and Anu again shake hands leaving their animosity behind.

== Cast ==
- Jayshree Gadkar as Anu
- Arun Sarnaik as Jaywant
- Dada Salvi as Raghoba
- Vasant Shinde as Bala
- Indira Chitnis as Atya
- Barchi Bahaddar as Master
- Usha Chavan as Tamasgir
- Maya Jadhav
- Baby Manik as young Anu

== Music ==
Composed by Vasant Pawar, the famous lavanis and other songs are written by Jagadish Khebudkar and sung by Balakraam, Suman Kalyanpur and Sulochana Chavan.

No.	Title	Singer(s)	Length
1.	"Solaawa Varees Dhokyacha"	Sulochana Chavan
2.	"Kas Kaay Patil Bar Haay Ka"	Sulochana Chavan
3.	"Aga Abala Mhanati"	Balakraam, Suman Kalyanpur
4.	"Sparsha Na Kariti"	Balakraam
5.	"Sawaal Majha Aika"	Balakraam, Sulochana Chavan
6.	"Hati Ektari, Houni Bhikari"	Suman Kalyanpur
7.	"Chumaka Chuma Naache Nartaki"	Balakraam, Suman Kalyanpur
8.	"Mala Vasantasena Disali"	Balakraam, Sulochana Chavan
9.	"Aamhi Indrachya Gharchya Waarangana"	Suman Kalyanpur
10.	"Kasa Ga Baai Vida Rangala Laal"	Suman Kalyanpur
11.	"Sawaal Jawaab"	Balakraam, Suman Kalyanpur
