= Chandrakant Mandare =

Indian actor (1913–2001)

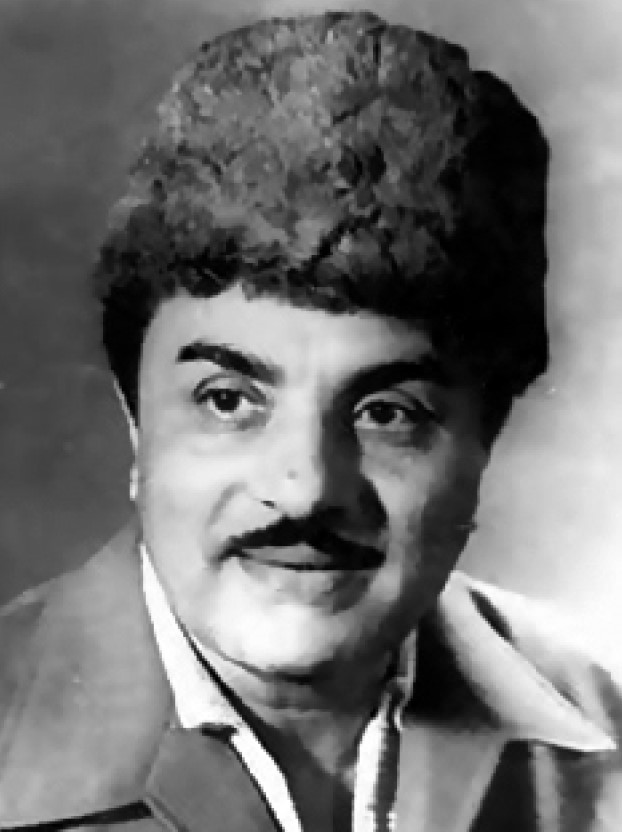
- Born: Gopal Mandare; 13 August 1913; Kolhapur, British India
- Died: 17 February 2001 (aged 87); Kolhapur, Maharashtra
- Occupation: Actor
- Relatives: Suryakant Mandhare (brother)

Chandrakant Mandhare (Marathi: चंद्रकांत मांडरे, (13 August 1913 – 17 February 2001) was a well-known Marathi Film actor and an artist. He played different roles in Marathi films and devoted his life to art. He was a master in paintings and powder shading. He was the elder brother of Suryakant Mandhare. He is recipient of two Maharashtra State Film Awards. In 2003, Mandare was honoured with the V. Shantaram Award, Maharashtra's highest award in the field of cinema.

== Early Life ==
Chandrakant Mandare, also known as Gopal Mandare, was born on 13 August 1913 in Kolhapur, Maharashtra. He grew up in a family where his father was engaged in the business of selling traditional sarees. He had one sister and a brother, Suryakant. Mandare completed his school education up to the sixth standard in English medium at Harihar Vidyalaya and Private High School in Kolhapur.

During his youth, Mandare developed an interest in painting, largely influenced by the landscapes of artist Madhavrao Bagal. His father initially approached the pioneering filmmaker and painter Baburao Painter to guide him; however, Painter directed him to Baba Gajabar. At the time, Gajabar was serving as an art teacher at the O'Brien Technical School. Under Gajabar's mentorship, Mandare learned the fundamentals of drawing and painting, subsequently passing the Intermediate Art Examination.

In 1932, Mandare's watercolor painting of the Panhala Fort was awarded a silver medal at an exhibition organized by the Rajaram Art Society of Kolhapur. Recognizing his technical skills, Gajabar helped him secure a position designing posters for the Balwant Cinetone Company. Following the closure of the company shortly thereafter, Mandare joined Baburao Painter's Shalini Cinetone on a monthly salary of 25 rupees, where he was responsible for creating the promotional posters for the mythological film Usha.

== Career ==
Mandare began his acting career when filmmaker Baburao Painter cast him as the lead in the talkie version of Savkari Pash. In 1938, he appeared alongside actor Chandra Mohan in the film Jwala. That same year, director Bhalji Pendharkar cast him in the Saraswati Cinetone production Raja Gopichand, introducing him under the screen name "Chandrakant." Following this, he secured a role in V. Shantaram’s film Shejari and subsequently took up full-time employment with Prabhat Film Company.

Over the following decades, Mandare performed in numerous Marathi films, including Thoratanchi Kamala, Bharat Bhet, Ram Rajya, Jai Malhar, Manacha Pan, Meeth Bhakar, Chhatrapati Shivaji, Vaadal, Muka Lekru, Bhaubeej, Sangtye Aika, Mohityanchi Manjula, Yuge Yuge Me Wat Pahili, Pavanakathcha Dhondi, Santh Wahate Krishnamai, Manacha Mujra, Dhanya Te Santaji Dhanaji, Irsha, Ashtavinayak, Bhalu, Pativrata, and Bangarwadi.

He also acted in Hindi cinema, with credits including Raja Gopichand, Aseer-e-Hawis, Maharathi Karna, Jeevan Yatra, Mere Lal, Chhatrapati Shivaji, Navrang, Suvarnabhumi, and Sher Shivaji, as well as a featured role in the English film Lines on the Rock. He frequently shared the screen with his brother, actor Suryakant.

His acting received formal recognition in the late 1960s. His performances in Yuge Yuge Me Wat Pahili (1965), Pavanakathcha Dhondi (1966), and Santh Wahate Krishnamai (1967) earned national honors, while his roles in Santh Wahate Krishnamai (1967) and Khandobachi Aan (1968) were awarded Maharashtra State Film Award for Best Actor. He became particularly known for his portrayals of historical and mythological figures, notably Chhatrapati Shivaji Maharaj, Sambhaji, Shahaji, Rama, and Krishna, alongside a variety of social character roles.

Mandare retired from mainstream acting in 1980. However, he returned to the screen for a final appearance in Amol Palekar's 1995 film Bangarwadi. Parallel to his film career, Mandare maintained a practice as a watercolor artist, frequently painting landscapes during filming breaks. His travels for art took him to countries such as France, Nepal, and the United States, and he held art exhibitions across India. During summer and Diwali vacations, he conducted instructional classes in landscape painting and powder shading for students.

In 1984, Mandare donated 400 of his original paintings to the state government, leading to the establishment of the Chandrakant Mandare Art Gallery in Kolhapur. In 1997, he founded the Chandrakant Mandare Art Academy, an institution that presents annual awards to working artists.

For his contributions to the arts, heed several honors, including recognition from the Jagatik Marathi Parishad (1989), the FIE Foundation, the Chhatrapati Shahu Award (1994), the V. Shantaram Award (1994), and the Chitrabhushan Award from the Akhil Bharatiya Marathi Chitrapat Mahamandala (1998).

== Filmography ==
Year	Film	Role	Language	Notes
1936	Savkari Pash	Haraba	Marathi	Debut
1938	Jwala	Tarang	Hindi	Hindi film debut
1939	Midnight Mail	Chandu	Hindi	
1941	Thoratanchi Kamala	Sambhaji Maharaj	Marathi	
1941	Shejari	Raiba	Marathi	
1942	Mata	Hari	Hindi	
1943	Ram Rajya	Rama	Hindi	
1944	Maharathi Karna	Arjuna	Hindi	
1946	Rukmini Swayamvar	Krishna	Hindi	
1947	Jai Malhar	Mujor Patil	Marathi	
1948	Mere Lal	Badshah	Hindi	
1948	Do Kaliyan	Mahesh	Hindi	
1949	Meeth Bhakar	Amrit	Marathi	
1949	Maanache Paan		Marathi	
1950	Ram Ram Pahuna	Shreepati Patil	Marathi	
1951	Patlacha Por	Patil	Marathi	
1951	Shiva Ramoshi	Shiva Ramoshi	Marathi	
1952	Chhatrapati Shivaji	Chhatrapati Shivaji	Marathi	
1954	Gokul Ka Raja	Raja	Hindi	
1955	Bhaubeej	Bajirao	Marathi	
1955	Punvechi Raat	Chandrakant	Marathi	
1959	Navrang	Thakur Sharan Singh	Hindi	
1959	Sangtye Aika	Sakharam Patil	Marathi	
1959	Maa Ke Aansoo	Baba	Hindi	
1963	Thoratanchi Kamala	Chhatrapati Shivaji	Marathi	
1963	Padada	Shiva	Marathi	
1963	Mohityanchi Manjula	Chhatrapati Shivaji	Marathi	
1964	Swayamvar Zale Seeteche	Ravana	Marathi	
1966	Laxmi Aali Ghara	Laxmi's husband	Marathi	
1966	Pavnakathcha Dhondi	Dhondi	Marathi	
1967	Arasa Kattalai	Himself	Tamil	
1967	Pahila Bhau	Bhau	Marathi	
1967	Bai Mee Bholi		Marathi	
1967	Lav-Kush	Rama	Hindi	
1968	Anjaam	Yashwant	Hindi	
1968	Dhanya Te Santaji Dhanaji	Dhanaji Jadhav	Marathi	
1969	Mukkam Post Dhebewadi		Marathi	
1969	Toofan		Hindi	
1969	Manacha Mujra	Babaji	Marathi	
1970	Dhartichi Lekara		Marathi	
1971	Maai Mauli		Marathi	
1973	Aai Ude Ga Ambabai		Marathi	
1979	Ashtavinayak	Nana Inamdar	Marathi	
1981	Soon Mazi Laxmi	Dhondiba Vastad	Marathi	
1981	Patalin	Jairam Kamble	Marathi	
1995	Bangarwadi	Karbhari	Marathi	
