= Suryakant Mandhare =

Indian actor (1925–1999)

Suryakant
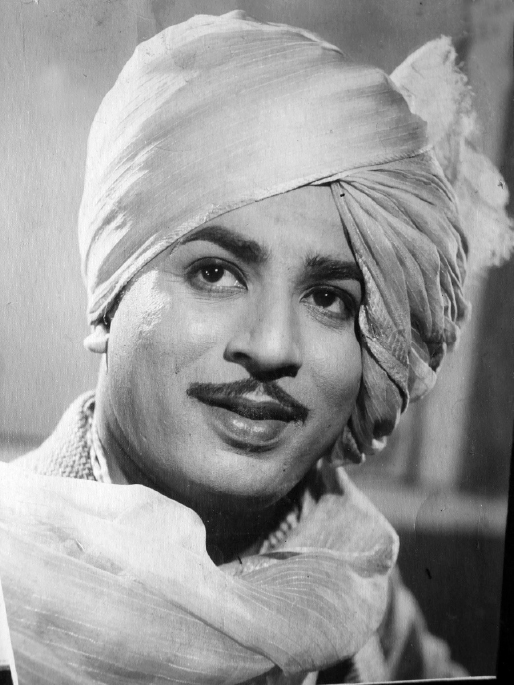
- Born: Vaman Tukaram Mandhare; 2 June 1926; Kolhapur, Bombay Presidency, British India
- Died: 22 August 1999 (aged 73); Pune, Maharashtra, India
- Other name: Suryakant Mandhare
- Occupations: Actor; director; producer; writer; sculptor; painter
- Years active: 1938–1999
- Spouse: Sushila Pise (m. 1947)
- Children: 1
- Relatives: Chandrakant Mandare (brother)
- Honours: Padma Shri (1973)

Suryakant Mandhare (pronounced [suːɾjəkaːnt̪ maːɳɖəɾe]; born as Vaman Tukaram Mandhare; 2 June 1926 – 22 August 1999; professionally known as Suryakant ) was an Indian actor and director, who worked in Marathi cinema. He acted in more than 100 films. He is considered one of the greatest and influential actors in the history of Marathi cinema. Actor and filmmaker Chandrakant Mandare is the elder brother of Suryakant. The Government of India honoured him with the Padma Shri in 1973 for his contribution to the arts.

Suryakant begun his acting career at the age of twelve as a child artist in Bhalji Pendharkar's Dhruv, returned in 1943 film Bhahirji Naik, a second collaboration with Pendharkar. Pairing of Suryakant with the actress Jayshree Gadkar was very appreciated, appeared in 70 films together including Mohityanchi Manjula (1960), Subhadra Haran (1963), Sadhi Mansa (1965), Patlaachi Soon (1966). He is noted for ruralist 'gramin chitrapat' genre films like Anant Mane's Sangte Aika (1959) and Dinkar D. Patil's Malhari Martand (1965). He is recipient of a Maharashtra State Film Award.

== Early life ==
Suryakant was born on 2 June 1926 in Kolhapur, Maharashtra. He was raised in a traditional household by his parents, Tanubai and Tukaram Narayan Mandhare, alongside his elder brother, Chandrakant Mandare. He completed his primary and secondary education at Saraswati Vidyalaya and subsequently at Harihar Vidyalaya in Kolhapur. Influenced by his father’s emphasis on fitness, he engaged in regular physical training from a young age, which contributed to his athletic build.

Mandre’s entry into cinema occurred in 1938 when, at the age of twelve, he was noticed by the filmmaker Bhalji Pendharkar. He made his screen debut that same year in the film Dhruva. While he initially balanced his studies with acting, his interest increasingly leaned toward the arts. In 1943, he concluded his formal education and began training in painting under the artist Baba Gajbar.

He later secured the role of "Balshivaji" in the film Bahirji Naik, also directed by Bhalji Pendharkar. It was during the production of this film that Pendharkar suggested he adopt the screen name "Suryakant." The name was officially adopted for his filmography, and he remained professionally known as Suryakant thereafter. His well-developed physique and rugged personality became his trademark, making him particularly suited for roles in rural-themed Marathi cinema.

== Career ==
Suryakant started acting while studying in school and played many roles, mostly negative roles. He was guided by Bhalji Pendharkar and Baba Gajbar when he was young. He got the knowledge of painting from Baba Gajbar, and filmmaking from Pendharkar. During his schooling, Suryakant was inclined towards painting and acting. In 1943, he played the role of young Shivaji Maharaj in the film Bahirji Naik directed by Bhalji Pendharkar. This film became very popular at that time and Bhalji Pendharkar named him Suryakant. From there on, he appeared on the screen with the name Suryakant in all the subsequent films.

Suryakant Mandhare has featured in more than 100 films. Portrayed protagonist in Ketki Banat, Stree Janma Tuji Kahani, Graha Devta, Bala Jo Jo Re. His on-screen pairing with actress Jayshree Gadkar became very popular, the duo worked together in 70 films. At the same time, his films with Sulochana and Usha Kiran were also popular. Along with the films, he acted in many plays, including Agraya, Tujhe Hai Tujpashi, Lagnachi Bedi, Jhunjarrao, Bebandshahi.

== Filmography ==
=== Film ===
- Ketkichya Vanat
- Dhruv
- Jai Bahvani
- Akher Jamla
- Muke Lekaru
- Maharani Yesubai
- Shubh Mangal
- Kul Daiwat
- Ghruh Deveta
- Sant Changdeo
- Sangte Aika
- Knaya Dan
- Salami
- Kalank Shobha
- Garba Gahrchi Lek
- Mohityanchi Manjula
- Thorattanchi Kamala
- Malhari Martand (1965)
- Patilachi Sun
- Bara Varshae Saha mahine Teen Diwas
- Aamhi Jato Amuchya Gava
- Murli Malhari Raichi
- Bhirji Nike
- Meth Bhakar
- Bala Jo Jo Re
- Stir Janma Tuzi Kahani
- Mazi Jameen
- Purushachi Jat
- Bal Maza Navasacha
- Punvechei Ratra
- Pawan Khind
- Phile Prem
- Akash Ganga
- Shaikleli Baiko
- Lagnala Jto Me
- Sakhya Sawara Mala
- Mansala Pankh Astat
- Gavchi Izzat
- Subhadra Haran
- Tu Sukhi Raha
- Sadhi Manse
- Pawankathcha Dhondi
- Pathcha Bahu
- Angai
- Sasurvas
- Shilanganache Sone
- Swarayajyacha Shiledar
- Aqushwant Ho Bala
- Kanchanganga
- Saser Maher
- Bahubeej
- Gaht Padli Thaka Thaka
- Ran Pakhra
- Preeti Sangam
- Pativrata
- Antricha Diva
- Panchaarti
- Bhv Tethe Dev
- Rang Panchmi
- Fakira
- Thoratanchi Munjala
- Sant Nivrutti - Gyanadeo
- Hi Nar Roopsundri
- Tochi Sadhu Olkhawa
- Sangu Kashi Me
- Dhanya te Santaji Dhanaji

=== Drama ===
Suryakant acted in following Marathi Dramas

- Zunzarrao
- Bebandshahi
- Shantisangram
- Nilwanti
- Tuze Ahe Tuzpashi
- Jeevan Maze Gangajal
- Maza Kuna Mahunu Me
- Pathlag
- Eka ho Eka
- Aaj Eath Tar Udya Titha
- Dasara Uajadala
- Patilachaya Pori Jara Japun
- Solav Varis Dhokyacha
- Tumhavari Jiv Maza Jadala
- Lakhat Herla Dhani
- Baiko Bilandar Navara Kalandar
- Gela Soudun Maza Kanha
- Galala Lagala Masa
- Agaryahun Sutka
- Sahayadricha Sona
- Dilaya Gahri tu Sukhi Raha
- Lagnachi Bedi
- Katha Kunachi ani Vathaya Kunachi
- Akashachi Unchi Theangni
- Hi Khnat jalite Mana
- Vadalvel
- Pavana Ala Re Ala
- Atharav Varis Lagnacha
- Rat Raglali Punveachi
- Usala Lagal Kolha
- Jali Mandi Pikali Karvanda
- Eashkachi Enagli Dasli
- Hawaldar Bhola Baivar Dola
- Tumhavar Keli me Marji Bahal
- Vilaspurchi Rambha
- Tumhi Ho Maze Bajirao
- Grandson : Shivraj Mandare

== Death ==
Suryakant expired on 22 August 1999 in Pune, Maharashtra at the age of 73.
