= Arun Sarnaik =

Indian actor and singer

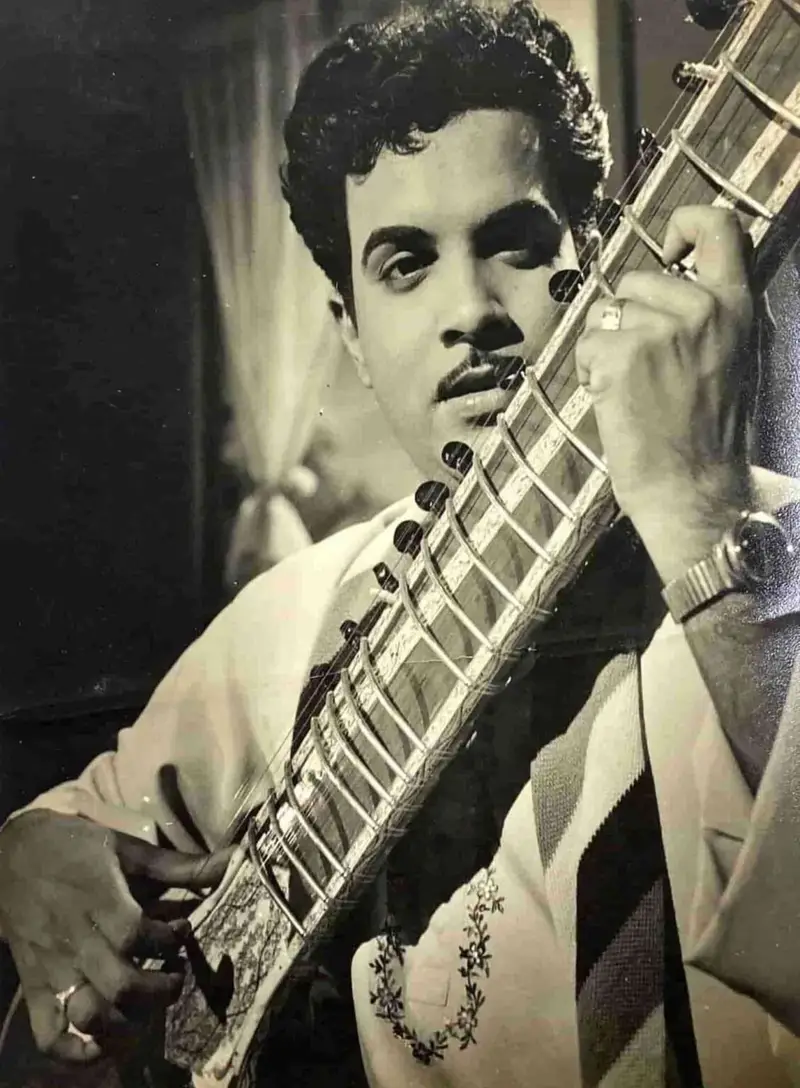
- Sarnaik in 1963
- Born: Arun Shankarrao Sarnaik; 4 October 1935; Kolhapur, Maharashtra, Bombay Presidency, British India
- Died: 21 June 1984 (aged 48); Bombay, Maharashtra, India
- Occupations: Actor; playback singer
- Years active: 1956–1984
- Spouse: Anita Sarnaik (m. 1960)
- Children: 2

Arun Shankarrao Sarnaik (4 October 1935 – 21 June 1984) was an Indian actor and singer who worked in Marathi films. In a career spanning 28 years, he is regarded as one of the most successful and accomplished actors in Marathi cinema. Sarnaik was the recipient of several accolades, including four Maharashtra State Film Awards.

He was the son of the famous singer Pandit Shankarao Sarnaik and brother of famous classical singer Pandit Nivruttibua Sarnaik from Jaipur Atrauli Gharana. Along with his acting talent, Sarnaik was noted for his screen presence and appearance, and was considered among the leading men of his era in Marathi cinema.

== Early life ==
Sarnaik was born on 4 October 1935 into a family with a rich musical and artistic heritage. He was the son of Shankarrao Sarnaik, a noted musician, and the nephew of Nivruttibuwa Sarnaik, a renowned classical singer. This familial background provided him with a strong foundation in the performing arts from an early age.

Before establishing himself as an actor, Sarnaik achieved proficiency in playing musical instruments, specifically the harmonium and tabla. His deep-rooted interest and skill in music eventually served as a gateway into the broader world of arts and entertainment.

Sarnaik pursued his formal education in Mumbai, where he earned his graduation degree from Ramnarain Ruia College. After graduation, he did some work in engineering factory at Ichalkaranji.

== Career ==
Sarnaik entered the acting profession in 1956 as a stage actor in the Marathi play Bhatala Dili Osri by Mo. Ga. Rangnekar. In 1961 he made his movie debut with Shahir Parshuram made by Anant Mane. Later, he acted in few films like Vardakshina by Dinkar D. Patil and Vithu Maza Lekurwala by Datta Dharmadhikari. He subsequently had lead roles in many Marathi movies starting in the black-and-white film era, and color. His song "Pratham Tuj Pahta" in the Marathi film Mumbaicha Jawai became popular.

Sarnaik had a musical background from his father and uncle. Arun Sarnaik was also an accomplished Tabla and Harmonium player. He also was very active with the Anandagram Charitable institution. Bal Thackeray was a great fan of Sarnaik's tabla-playing skills. His role of Chief Minister in the movie Sinhasan (1979) which was directed by Jabbar Patel was a milestone for the Marathi film industry.

He was closely associated with NGO Anandgram where he helped needy people.

== Personal life ==
Sarnaik was married with Anita Sarnaik and had two children. On 21 June 1984, while returning from a film shoot for Pandharichi Vaari, he, his wife, their son were killed in a road accident. His daughter survived. Sarnaik’s daughter, Dr. Savita Sarnaik Naiknavare, survived the tragic accident that claimed the lives of her parents and brother in 1984. She went on to become a paediatrician, practicing medicine before giving up her medical career to focus on social causes. In 1991, she married Ranjit Naiknavare, who belongs to a prominent builder family in Pune. Together, they have a daughter and a son. Later in life, she produced a documentary tribute to her father entitled Pappa Sanga Kunache... (“Papa, tell whose…”), which reflects his legacy through archival research and personal storytelling.

== Filmography ==
=== Films ===
Year	Film	Role	Notes
1961	Vaijayanta	Shahir	
1961	Shahir Parshuram	Parshuram's Brother	
1962	Vithu Maza Lekurwala	Vithu	
1962	Vardakshina	Shanta's Brothee	
1962	Rangalya Ratri Asha	Yashwant	Maharashtra State Film Award for Best Actor
1963	Subhadra Haran	Duryodhana	
1963	Pahu Re Kiti Vaat	Dr. Charudatta	
1964	Kaai Ho Chamatkar	Shiva	
1964	Sawaal Majha Aika!	Jaywant	Maharashtra State Film Award for Best Actor
1965	Kela Ishara Jata Jata	Ganpatrao	
1966	Dhananjay	Dhananjay	
1967	Thamb Laxmi Kunku Lavate	Narayanrao	
1967	Deva Tujhi Sonyachi Jejuri		
1967	Suranga Mhantyat Mala	Suranga's Husband	
1967	Santh Wahate Krishnamai	Manohar Mahadik	
1968	Lady Killer	Aroon	
1968	Ek Gaav Bara Bhangadi	Inspector Shirke (Petiwala)	
1968	Khandobachi Aan	Krishna Jadhav	
1969	Manacha Mujra	Umaji	
1969	Dongarachi Maina	Raghu	
1969	Nandaila Jaate	Jaisingh	
1969	Gan Gaulan	Gunwantrao Jejurikar	
1970	Mumbaicha Jawai	Avinash Ponkshe	
1970	Meech Tujhi Priya	Mukund	
1970	Gharkul	Mr. Deshpande	
1970	Ganane Ghungroo Haravle	Dhanajirao	
1970	Dhakti Bahin	Madhav	Maharashtra State Film Award for Best Actor
1971	Ashich Ek Ratra	Shripati Pehelwan	
1971	Kasa Kai Patil Bara Haay Ka	Anandrao	
1971	Kunkwacha Karanda	Sunil Deo	
1972	Paanch Najuk Bote	Constable Ram & Anand	
1972	Pathrakhin		
1972	Aai Mi Kuthe Jau?		
1973	Bholi Bhabdi		
1973	Jawai Vikat Ghene Aahe		
1974	Ashi Hi Sataryachi Tarha	Bapu	
1975	Chandanachi Choli Ang Ang Jali	Vasudev	
1976	Pahuni		
1976	Farrari	Shripatrao	
1977	Badla	Vasu	
1977	Naav Motha Lakshan Khota	Sethji	
1978	Bhairu Pehelwan Ki Jai	Dadu	
1979	Sinhasan	Jivajirao Shinde	
1980	Darodekhor	Dharma	
1980	Savli Premachi		
1980	Choravar Mor	Vishwasrao	
1980	Chattis Nakhrewali		
1980	Devapudhe Manus		
1980	Sharan Tula Bhagwanta		
1981	Aai	College Professor	
1981	Totaya Aamdar	Aamdar Bhujangrao Mohite	
1982	Situm	Dr. Ginde	
1982	Dalimbi		
1982	Kay Ga Saku?		
1982	Kuvari		
1982	Chandane Shimpit Ja	Police Commissioner Sadanand Mohite	
1983	Gupchup Gupchup	Bhausaheb	
1984	Shraadha		
1984	Sage Soyare	Ramrao	
1984	Jagavegli Prem Kahani	Priya's Father	
1984	Waqt Se Pehle		Hindi film
1984	Gharcha Bhedi	Mamasaheb Deshpande	
1984	Gulchhadi	Savkar	
1984	Lek Chalali Sasarla	Wagh	
1984	Maherchi Manase	Shripatrao Bhosle	
1985	Jai Renuka Devi Yellama	Dev	Posthumous release
1986	Maaficha Sakshidar	Lawyer Sathe	Posthumous release
1986	Bijli	Shankar Patil	Posthumous release
1987	Sher Shivaji		Posthumous release
1987	Dozakh	Madanlal	Posthumous release

=== Theater plays ===
- Aparadh Meech Kela
- Gosht Janmantarichi
- Goodbye Doctor
- Lavangi Mirchi Kolhapurachi
- Tarun Turk, Mhatare Ark

== Discography ==
Year	Film	Song	Composer	Co-artist
1969	Gan Gavlan	"Gan Gavlan Zali Suru"	Ram Kadam	Solo
1969	Dongarchi Maina	"Tanda Chalala Re Gadya"	Ram Kadam	Krishna Kalle
1969	Manacha Mujra	"Chandani Chandrachi Shobhe Gaganachi"	Vasant Pawar	Solo
1970	Gharkul	"Pappa Sanga Kunache"	C. Ramchandra	Rani Varma, Pramila Datar
1975	Chandanachi Choli Ang Ang Jali	"Ek Lajran Sajra Mukhda"	Ram Kadam	Usha Mangeshkar
1975	Chandanachi Choli Ang Ang Jali	"Avaghachi Sansar Sukhacha"	Ram Kadam	Solo

== Death ==
Arun Sarnaik died in a road accident on 21 June 1984 along with his wife and one of his two children while he was going from Kolhapur to Pune. He was heading to Pune for first day of his shooting of the movie Pandharichi Vaari in which he was cast for the lead role. After his sudden death the movie was then completed by offering the lead role to another artist.
