= Vyankatesh Madgulkar =

Indian writer (1927-2001)

Venkatesh Digambar Madgulkar (5 April 1927 – 28 August 2001) was one of the most popular Marathi writers of his time. He became well-known mainly for his realistic writings about village life in a part of southern Maharashtra called Maandesh, set in a period of 15 to 20 years before and after Independence. He was often called Tatya ("old man", or "grand old man" in Marathi) by his admirers, friends and family.

== Life ==
Madgulkar was born in the village of Madgul in today's Sangli district of Maharashtra, then part of Maandesh, Aundh princely state. His father was in the employment of the government of the Aundh princely state. His brother was the poet G. D. Madgulkar.

When Madgulkar was in his teens, he left home and joined a group of nationalists fighting for India’s freedom from the British Raj. For these activities, the British government banned him as a criminal for two years.

After independence, Madgulkar returned home. Though he had never finished his high school education, but he passed vernacular final Marathi 7th exam with good marks. He got a job as a school teacher at Nimbawade village, when he was just 14 years old. he had a keen interest in reading. He taught himself to read English on his own so that he could become familiar with English as well as Marathi literature. He cited especially the influence of John Steinbeck, George Orwell and Liam O'Flaherty.

Madgulkar also had an aptitude for sketching and painting, so he went to Kolhapur to take painting lessons. While studying there, at age 19, he entered a competition for short story writing and won a prize. This encouraged him to pursue a literary career rather than painting.

In 1948, when he was 21, he became a journalist and, two years later, he moved to Mumbai where he had the opportunity to write scripts for a few Marathi movies.

In 1955, Madgulkar took a job in Pune in the rural programming department of All India Radio. He worked there for the next 40 years. During all those years, he wrote abundantly.

He died in 2001 due to complications related to diabetes.

== Writings ==
Madgulkar wrote 8 novellas, over 200 short stories, about 40 screenplays, and some folk plays (लोकनाट्य), travelogues, and essays on nature. He translated some English books into Marathi, especially books on wild life, as he was an avid hunter. This led to his nickname "Colonel Bahadur".

He published his first book, Mandeshi Manse (माणदेशी माणसे) in 1949 when he was 22. His 1954 novella Bangarwadi (बनगरवाडी) was translated in several languages, including English, German, and Hindi. His novel Wawtal (वावटळ) was translated into English, Kannada and also in Russian by Raduga Publishers. A movie based on Bangarwadi was made under the direction of Amol Palekar.

=== In English translation ===
- The Village Had No Walls. A Translation of "Bangarwadi" by Ram Deshmukh. Bombay, Asia Pub. House [1958]
- The Winds of Fire. Translated by Pramod Kale. Hind Pocket Books, [1974]

== Accolades ==
Madgulkar received in 1983 a Sahitya Akademi Award for his novel Sattantar (सत्तांतर). The same year, he presided over Marathi Sahitya Sammelan, which was held at Ambajogai.

== Other sources (in Marathi) ==
- Yeshwant Shripad Raste, Vyankatesh Madgulkar Samagra Vangmay Soochi, Utkarsh Prakashan, Pune; 1996
- M. D. Hatkangalekar (ed.), Vyankatesh Madgulkar: Mandeshi Manus Ani Kalavant, Shabda Prakashan, Satara; 2001
