= Dada Salvi =

Indian actor (1904–1980)

- Born: Dinkar Shivram Salvi; 4 December 1904; Phansop, Ratnagiri district, British Raj
- Died: 29 October 1980 (aged 75); Pune, Maharashtra, India
- Other name: D. S. Salvi
- Occupations: Actor; director
- Years active: 1928–1980
- Spouse: Sakhubai

Dinkar Shivram Salvi (1904–1980), popularly known as Dada Salvi was an Indian actor who worked in Marathi and Hindi films.

== Career ==
Dada Salvi was born in Phansop, Ratnagiri district, and began his career in entertainment by actively participating in various programs in his village, including acting in dramas. The playwright Tipnis brought him to Mumbai, where he secured a position at the Excelcior Film Company managed by Sheth Vazir Ahijee. Salvi's educational background made him an ideal candidate for film work, leading to his employment at a monthly salary of 25 rupees. He made his acting debut in the first silent film Khun-e-Nahak (1928). Impressed by his performance, Imperial Film Company invited him to join them, where he directed and acted in several silent films such as Madanmanjari, Indira B.A., Bholashikar, Cinema Girl, Hamara Hindustan, Raat Ki Baat, and Khuda Ki Shaan. Additionally, he worked in Paramount Film Company's Poliadi Pehalwan, directed by Jayant Desai.

Salvi played a significant role in the Marathi film industry, notably in the first talkie film Alam Ara, and continued to act in films like Aut Ghatkayacha Raja, Bhakt Pralhad, Chatrapati Sambhaji, and Thakasen Rajput under the banner Saraswati Cinetone. He gained recognition for his portrayal of Kalusha Kabjee in Chatrapati Sambhaji. Hans Chitra acknowledged his talent and offered him roles in Kolhapur, where he delivered impressive performances.

In 1937, Salvi ventured into talkies with Premveer, marking the beginning of his collaboration with Master Vinayak. Their partnership led to memorable films such as Brahmachari, where he portrayed the father of the lead actress. He showcased his versatility with roles ranging from a drunkard in Brandy Ki Bottle, a loving father in Devta and a professor in Ardhangi.

As Hans Pictures evolved into Navayug Films, Salvi continued to contribute to the industry with films like Sangam, Pahili Mangalagaur, and Tujhach. His acting prowess remained unmatched, and he played the lead role of Barrister Manohar in Majh Bal for Prabhat Films after Vinayak's departure. His performances in films like Chimukla Sansar, Gajabha, Badi Maa, and Subhadra further solidified his reputation as a versatile actor.

After Vinayak's demise in 1947, Salvi continued to act in films like Dr. Kotnis Ki Amar Kahani, Tadbir, and Maharana Pratap. Despite declining offers to act in Ramshastri for Prabhat Films, he portrayed the antagonist in Jivacha Sakha for Mangal Pictures, receiving acclaim for his performance. Salvi's contribution to Marathi cinema was significant, with notable roles in films such as Patalacha Por, Vadal, Kanchanganga, Kuldaivat, Sangte Aika, Shikleli Bayko, Antaricha Diwa, Umaj Padel Tar, and Kanyadan, where his portrayal of a father-in-law resonated with audiences.

During his tenure at Imperial Film Company, Salvi married actress Sakubai. His journey in the film industry left a lasting impact, showcasing his talent and versatility as an actor.

== Filmography ==
Source: Maharashtra Nayak

- Khoon-E-Nahak
- Madanmanjiri
- Indira B. A.
- Bholashikar
- Cinema Girl
- Hamara Hindustan
- Raat Ki Baat
- Khuda Ki Shaan
- Alam Ara
- Aaut Ghatkecha Raja
- Bhakta Pralhad
- Thaksen Rajputra
- Chhatrapati Sambhaji
- Premveer
- Bramhachari
- Savangadi
- Brandachi Batali
- Devta
- Ardhangi
- Amrit
- Sangam
- Pahili Mangalagaur
- Tujhach
- Majha Bal
- Chimukala Sansar
- Lapandav
- Gajyabhau
- Badi Maa
- Subhadra
- Tadbir
- Maharana Pratap
- Jivacha Sakha
- Patalacha Por
- Vadal
- Kanchanganga
- Kuldaivat
- Sangte Aika
- Shikleli Bayko
- Antaricha Diva
- Mansala Pankh Astat
- Saptapadi
- Char Diwas Sasuche Char Diwas Suneche
- Umaj Padel Tar
- Bhairavi
- Kanyadaan
- Sawaal Majha Aika!
- Malhari Martand
- Janaki
- Baykocha Bhau
- Kay Ho Chamatkar
- Ek Don Teen
- Pahila Bhau
- Suadarshan
- Ek Gaav Bara Bhangadi
- Ganane Ghungroo Haravale
- Ashi Rangali Raat
- Kaali Bayko
- Manala Tar Dev
- Nate Jadale Don Jivache
- Ashich Ek Ratra
- Kasa Kay Patil Bara Hay Ka
- Soon Majhi Savitri
- Aunda Pagin Karayacha
- Karava Tasa Bharava
