= Jagdish Khebudkar =

Marathi writer and lyricist (1932–2011)

- Born: 10 May 1932; Haladi village Dist. Kolhapur Maharashtra
- Died: 3 May 2011; Kolhapur, Maharashtra
- Occupations: Marathi litterateur and Lyricist, Teacher
- Writing career
- Notable works: his songs in films like Pinjra (1972), Sadhi Mansa, Samna (1975), Chandra Hota Sakshila and Ashtavinayak
- Notable awards: Maharashtra State Film Award for Best Lyricist (10 times)

Jagdish Khebudkar (10 May 1932 – 3 May 2011) was a Marathi writer and lyricist of Marathi cinema, known for his songs in films like Pinjra (1972), Sadhi Mansa, Samna (1975), Chandra Hota Sakshila and Ashtavinayaka. Starting in 1960, he remained associated with the Marathi film industry for the next 50 years, during which he established a repertoire of 2500 songs in 300 films. He also wrote 3500 poems, 25 stories and five plays. He also wrote a prayer called 'नमस्कार माझ्या ज्ञानमंदिरा'

== Early life and background ==
Born in 1932 at Haladi village District Kolhapur Maharashtra, Khebudkar at the age of 16, wrote his first poem following the tragic riots post the assassination of Gandhi ji. It was aired by the All India Radio and Doordarshan.

== Career ==
A teacher by profession, in 1960, Khebudkar started his career as songwriter in Marathi cinema, and went on to work with noted composers like Ram Kadam and Vasant Pawar during the 1960s and 1970s. He wrote seven songs for V. Shantaram's Marathi hit film Pinjra (1972), he was felicitated the V. Shantaram Lifetime Achievement Award, among others. As songwriter, he wrote songs across genres, including romantic songs, religious-devotional songs and lavanis, which became popular in Marathi cinema.

Some of his most memorable Marathi songs were written for the films Kunku Lavte Mahercha, Bijli, Don Baika Phajeeti Aika, Samna and Manaacha Mujra.

He died on 3 May 2011 in Kolhapur from lung infection, while being treated for renal ailment. He was cremated on the banks of Panchganga, Kolhapur. He is survived by two sons and two daughters.

== Filmography ==
- Bai Mee Bholi (1967)
- Bara Varshe 6 Mahine 3 Diwas (1967)
- Deiva Janile Kuni (1967)
- Manaacha Mujra (1969)
- Pinjra (1972)
- Ghara Sansara (1973)
- Zunz (1975)
- Samna (1975)
- Don Baika Phajeeti Aika (1982)
- Bijli (1986)
- Ashi Gyaneshwari (2001)
- Navra Maza Navsacha (2004)
- Kunku Lavte Mahercha (2004)
- Astharoopa Jai Vaibhavlakshmi Maata (TV film) (2008)
- Maherchi Maaya (2007)
- Gadhvacha Lagna (2007)

== Awards ==
Maharashtra State Film Award for Best Lyricist

Year	Songs	Film
1965	"Kasa Kaay Patil"	Sawaal Majha Aika!
1966	"Usala Lagal Kolha"	Kela Ishara Jata Jata
