= Ganpat Patil =

Indian actor

- Born: 1920
- Died: 23 March 2008
- Occupations: Marathi stage and film actor

Ganpat Patil (1920 – 23 March 2008) was an Indian actor in Marathi movies and drama. died due to old age . He was interested in acting so much that he accepted role of side singer in Tamashapat a traditional character in Marathi Tamashas and Lavanis, due to his portrayal of this character.

== Early life ==
Ganpat Patil, born in 1920, had a rough childhood due to the early death of his father. After his father's death, along with his mother, he had to take on menial jobs to support their family of seven. Even though their livelihood mostly came from selling garlands and bread, Ganpat wanted to be an actor. As a child actor his first role was as an extra in the film Bal Dhruv. He attempted suicide in Panchganaga river in Kolhapur.

He has two sons and two daughters. He went through a tough time to arrange the marriage of his sons because of his acting (pansy) character in movies.

== Acting career ==
In an acting career spanning 62 films and 17 dramas, Ganpat specialized in acting the role of Nachya, beginning with Aika Ho Aika and Jali Mandi Pikali Karavand. This attracted the attention of director Krishna Patil who offered him a similar role in Waghya Murali.

Though primarily acting in supporting roles, Ganpat played a lead role in Bhalji Pendharkar's movie Sakhya Sajana. The movie script was specifically written with Ganpat in mind, and is about a Nachya in films who is not happy about his sexuality and decides to have it treated, after which he regains confidence and eventually lives a happily married life. Apparently for this movie Ganpat Patil had to give up a Nachya role in V. Shantaram's film Pinjara.

== Awards ==
- Akhil Bharatiya Marathi Chitrapat Mahamandal (ABMCM) honored Ganpat Patil with the Chitrabhushan award in 2006 for his contribution and service to the Marathi film industry.
- He was also given the Zee Marathi Lifetime Achievement Award.

== See also ==
- Ganpat Patil at IMDb
