= Vasant Shinde (actor) =

Marathi actor

- Born: Vasant Krishnaji Shinde; 14 May 1912; Bhandardara, Bombay Presidency, British India
- Died: 4 July 1999 (aged 87); Pune, Maharashtra, India
- Occupation: Actor
- Years active: 1925–1999
- Awards: Balgandharva Award

Vasant Shinde (14 May 1912 – 4 July 1999) was an Indian actor in Marathi cinema, well known for his comedic roles. He began his career in the mid-1920s at Dadasaheb Phalke's Hindustan Film Company, where he worked across various film-making departments. His acting debut was in Chaturthicha Chandra (1925), where he played Lord Ganpati. Over his distinguished career, Shinde appeared in notable films such as Pedgavche Shahane (1952), Gulacha Ganpati (1953), Mohityanchi Manjula (1963), and Manacha Mujra (1969). Shinde appeared in 170 films and 100 plays, earning several awards including the Shanta Hubilkar Award, the Balgandharva Award, and the Kalgaurav Award.

== Early life ==
Vasant Shinde was born on 14 May 1912, in Bhandardara. His participation into the arts began in 1924 when he joined the Hindustan Film Company in Nashik, where he was initially employed in the carpentry department. His artistic talents soon led to his transfer to the painting department. Under the mentorship of Dadasaheb Phalke, Shinde was exposed to various aspects of film production and developed skills in acting, dancing, and singing.

== Career ==
Shinde made his acting debut in 1925 with a role in the silent film Chaturthicha Chandra, portraying Ganapati. He gained prominence with roles in other silent films such as Sitavanwas, Ram-Ravan Yuddh, and Bhakta Prahlada. Over his five-year tenure at Hindustan Film Company, he appeared in 19 silent films.

After leaving Hindustan Film Company around 1928-29 due to dissatisfaction with the industry and low pay, Shinde briefly worked with Bal Mohan Theater Company in Pune. He joined Arunodaya Natak Mandali in 1929, where he gained recognition for his stage performances in plays like 'Girnivala,' 'Pranapratishtha,' and 'Sakshatkar.'

Shinde later worked with Navjeevan Sangeet Mandali, where his comedic skills shone. His career in the theater continued with Rajaram Sangeet Mandali, where his role in 'Bhaavbandhan' earned him acclaim. He also worked with Lalit Kala Kunj before returning to the film industry.

Shinde's film career spanned from silent films to talkies. His first talkie was Mayabazar (1939). He appeared in over 190 Marathi films and seven Hindi films, including notable roles in Sasurwas (1946) under Bhalji Pendharkar's direction. He also acted in nine unreleased films and was celebrated for his performances in around 57 folk dramas.

== Death ==
Vasant Shinde died on 14 July 1999 at a private nursing home in Pune. His autobiography Vinodvriksh, published in June 1999, written by Madhu Potdar, chronicles his extensive career. Renowned actor Sharad Talwalkar praised Shinde as a "season's best," reflecting his significant impact on Indian cinema and theater.
