= Parshurampur =

Parshurampur or Parsurampur (from Parshuram and -pur) may refer to these places:

- Parshurampur, Bara, a former Village Development Committee in Bara District of Nepal
- Parshurampur, Parsa, a former Village Development Committee in Parsa District of Nepal
- Parsurampur, a village in Mohammadpur Block in Azamgarh district, Uttar Pradesh, India
- Parashurampur, community development block in Mohania, Kaimur district, Bihar, India

== See also ==
- Parshuram (disambiguation)
- Parasuram (disambiguation)
- Parsurampura, a town in Rajasrhan, India
- Parasuramapura, a village in Karnataka, India
