= Parshuram =

Parshuram may refer to:

- Parashurama, a warrior-saint in Hinduism

== Places ==
- Parshuram, Bangladesh
- Parshuram, Dadeldhura, a municipality in Nepal
- Parshuram Upazila, a district (upazila) in Bangladesh

== People ==
- Parasuram (director), Indian film director and screenwriter
- Rajshekhar Basu or Parashuram, Indian writer
- Parshuram Basnet, Nepalese crime boss
- Parshuram Gangwar (1937–2015), Indian politician
- Parshuram Ballal Godbole (1799–1874), Indian lexicographer, editor, and translator
- Parsuram Majhi, member of the Indian Parliament
- Parshuram Megi Gurung, Nepalese communist politician
- Parshuram Mishra (1894–1981), Indian botanist and academic
- Parshuram Pant Pratinidhi (1160-1718), governor in the Maratha Empire

== Hindu Pilgrimage Sites ==
- Parshuram Kund, Hindu pilgrimage site in Arunachal Pradesh, India
- Parshuram Mahadev Temple, Hindu temple in Rajasthan, India
- Parshuram Temple, Chiplun, Hindu temple in Maharashtra, India

== Films ==
- Parashuram (1989 film), an Indian Kannada-language film
- Parashuram (1979 film), an Indian Bengali-language drama film
- Parasuram (2003 film), an Indian Tamil-language action film
- Bhagwan Parshuram, a 1970 Indian film

== See also ==
- Parashurama (disambiguation)
- Parashurama Kalpasutra, Hindu text in the Shri Vidya system of worship
- Parasuram Express, an express train that runs between the Indian cities of Mangalore and Thiruvananthapuram
