= Parashurama (disambiguation) =

Parashurama is a mythical warrior-saint in Hinduism.

Parashurama (alternatively Parashuram, Parasurama, Parasuram, Parshuram, Poroshuram, Porshuram) may also refer to:

- Parshuram Upazila, administrative area in Bangladesh
- Parshuram, Dadeldhura, municipality in Dadeldhura district in Nepal
- Parashuram (1989 film), Indian Kannada-language film
- Parashuram (1979 film), Indian Bengali-language drama film
- Parasuram (2002 film), Indian Telugu-language action film
- Parasuram (2003 film), Indian Tamil-language action film
- Parasuram (director), Indian film director and screenwriter
- Rajshekhar Basu, Indian writer who wrote under the pen name Parashurama
- Parsuram Majhi, member of the Indian Parliament

== See also ==
- Parshuram (disambiguation)
- Parshurampur (disambiguation)
- Parashurama Kalpasutra, Hindu text in the Shri Vidya system of worship
- Parasuram Express, express train that runs between the Indian cities of Mangalore and Thiruvananthapuram
