= Dawat =

- Directed by: B. R. Ishara
- Produced by: Dilip Dutt
- Starring: Jayshree Gadkar; Satish Kaul; Manmohan Krishna; Sanjeev Kumar
- Release date: 1974
- Country: India
- Language: Hindi

Dawat is a 1974 Bollywood drama film directed by B. R. Ishara and produced by Dilip Dutt.

== Cast ==
- Dilip Dutt
- Jayshree Gadkar
- Satish Kaul
- Manmohan Krishna
- Sanjeev Kumar
- Raza Murad
- Johnny Walker

== Soundtrack ==
Track#	Title	Singer(s)
1	"Tadap Tadap Ke Guzaari Hai Zindagi Humne"	Asha Bhosle
2	"Aise Bhi Na Rutho Tum Ke Jeena Mushkil Ho"	Mukesh, Asha Bhosle
3	"Aa Zara Tu Mere Paas"	Asha Bhosle
4	"Mero Man Mere Ghanshyam"	Usha Mangeshkar
