= Jayshree Gadkar =

Indian actress (1942–2008)

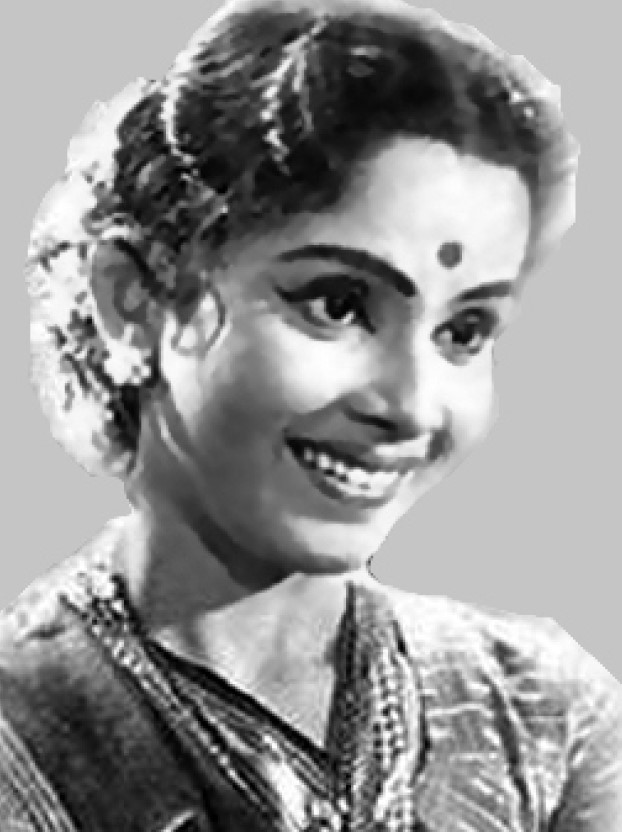
- Born: 21 February 1942; Karwar, Bombay Presidency, British India (now in Karnataka, India)
- Died: 29 August 2008 (aged 66); Mumbai, Maharashtra, India
- Occupation: Actress
- Years active: 1955–2000
- Spouse: Bal Dhuri (m. 1975)

Jayshree Gadkar (21 February 1942– 29 August 2008) was an Indian actress who worked in Marathi and Hindi language films. She is regarded as one of the greatest stars of Marathi cinema. Cited as the “Queen of Marathi cinema.” Gadkar was the recipient of various accolades, receiving six Maharashtra State Film Awards, a Zee Chitra Gaurav Puraskar, and a Rasrang Phalke Puraskar. Gadkar's career spanned over 45 years in a wide range of genres. She often played strong-willed women. In 2003, Gadkar was honoured with the V. Shantaram Award, Maharashtra's highest award in the field of cinema.

She began her career as a child dance artist. She entered films as a tamasha dancer in movies. Her first role was that of a group dancer in V. Shantaram's Jhanak Jhanak Payal Baaje in 1955, which featured Sandhya as the leading lady. Later, well known Marathi film Director Dinkar D. Patil cast her in a small role with dance in his Marathi film Disat Tasa Nasat, opposite Raja Gosavi. This was followed by Sangtye Aika, a tamasha-based movie which was the first in which she played a leading role, helping her gain fame and recognition for such heroine roles.

Gadkar acted in about 250 films over a period of four decades. Her filmography was varied and included a rich repertoire of tamasha stories as also mythological films in addition to socials and love stories. In later years, Gadkar turned to directorial efforts such as Saasar Maher and Ashi Asavi Saasu. She also acted in Ramanand Sagar's TV series Ramayana, as Kaushalya (mother of Rama) along with her husband Bal Dhuri, who was Dasharath (father of Rama). Her autobiography Ashi Me Jayshree was published in 1986.

== Early life ==
Gadkar was born into a Gaud Saraswat Brahmin family at Kanasgiri, a small village near Sadashivgad in the Karwar district (now Uttara Kannada district) of Karnataka. She moved to Mumbai during her childhood, where she completed her primary education at a municipal school in Khetwadi and her secondary education at Rammohan High School in Girgaon.

From a young age, Gadkar showed a profound interest in music and dance. She underwent formal vocal training for ten years under the tutelage of Master Navrang and was professionally trained in Kathak. Before entering the film industry, she also participated in amateur theater. Gadkar's initial entry into cinema was as a child artist. Her first significant screen appearance was in a group dance sequence alongside lead actress Sandhya in V. Shantaram’s acclaimed Hindi film Jhanak Jhanak Payal Baaje in 1955. Her career gained further momentum after a performance in Pune, where she danced to the song "Latpat Latpat Tuzha Chalna" for the visiting Soviet leader Nikita Khrushchev. Photographs of this performance caught the attention of director Dinkar D. Patil, who cast her in a dance sequence in his film Disat Tasa Nasat in 1956, which is considered her formal debut.

She secured her first role as a lead heroine in the film Gath Padli Thaka Thaka in 1956, produced by Bhalji Pendharkar and directed by Raja Paranjape, sharing the screen with actors such as Baburao Pendharkar, Raja Gosavi, Suryakant, Ramesh Deo, and Ganpat Patil.

== Personal life ==
Gadkar married actor Bal Dhuri on 21 February 1975 in an arranged marriage. Their match was arranged through Vasu Kolhatkar, the brother-in-law of theatre producer Mohan Wagh. According to Dhuri, they supported each other's acting careers and maintained a harmonious professional and personal relationship. The couple had a son named Anand. They remained married until Gadkar's death in August 2008. She also published an autobiography, Ashi Mi Jayshri.

== Career ==
=== Early career and entry into Marathi cinema ===
Gadkar began her screen career as a group dancer in V. Shantaram's Hindi film Jhanak Jhanak Payal Baaje (1955), which featured Sandhya in the lead role. She subsequently appeared in the Hindi film Savitri (1955). She entered Marathi cinema with Dista Tasa Nasta (1956), directed by Dinkar D. Patil, in which she appeared in a small role alongside Raja Gosavi. She followed this with Gath Padli Thaka Thaka (1956) and Aaliya Bhogasi (1957).

Her major breakthrough came with Anant Mane's Marathi film Sangtye Aika (1959), in which she played Hansa. The film was based on the tamasha tradition and became a major commercial success. Her performance in the lavani song "Bugadi Majhi Sandli Ga" became particularly popular among audiences. The film established her as a leading actress and made her closely associated with tamasha and lavani-based cinema. During the same year, she also appeared in Hindi films including Naya Sansar, Madari, Ek Armaan Mera, Do Gunde and Charanon Ki Dasi.

=== Popularity and acclaimed performances ===
Following the success of Sangtye Aika, She became one of the prominent actresses in Marathi cinema. In 1960, she appeared in the Hindi film Bindya. Her Marathi films during the following year included Avaghachi Sansar, Pancharati, Lagnala Jaato Me, Ram Lila, Jai Bhawani, Saranga and Manini (1961). In Manini, she portrayed Malati, a role that demonstrated her ability to perform beyond the rural and tamasha-based characters with which she had initially become associated. The film was an important milestone in her career.

In 1962, she appeared in Marathi films such as Baap Maza Brahmachari, Sukh Aale Mazhya Daari and Bhagyalaxmi, alongside the Hindi film Private Secretary. The following year, she portrayed Manjula Mohite in the historical Marathi film Mohityanchi Manjula (1963), directed by Bhalji Pendharkar. She also appeared in Subhadra Haran and Padada, as well as the Hindi films Yeh Dil Kisko Doon and Mere Armaan Mere Sapne. In 1964, she appeared in Sawaal Majha Aika, in which she played Anu, and Mahasati Anusaya, portraying Anusaya. Her other Marathi films included Kai Ho Chamatkar and Ek Don Teen. These films further established her versatility across social, historical and mythological subjects.

Gadkar continued to enjoy considerable popularity during the second half of the 1960s. In 1965, she appeared in Sadhi Mansa, portraying Parvati Lokhande. For which she received Maharashtra State Film Award for Best Actress. Her performance in the film, particularly in the song "Airaneechya Deva Tula", became one of the memorable moments of her career. She also appeared in Malhari Martand, Gopal Krishna, Anmol Moti and Aai Kuna Mhanu Mee. In 1966, her Marathi releases included Patlachi Soon, Pavnakathcha Dhondi and Veer Bajrang, alongside the Hindi film Toofan Mein Pyaar Kahan. She appeared in Lav-Kush (1967), portraying Sita, and continued working in Marathi films such as Sangu Kashi Mi, Suranga Mhantyat Mala and Thamb Laxmi Kunku Lavate, for this film, she received the Maharashtra State Film Award for Best Actress. She also appeared in the Hindi film Baharon Ke Sapne (1967).

In 1968, Gadkar appeared in the Marathi film Ek Gaav Bara Bhangadi, directed by Anant Mane, in which she played Phoola. The film became one of her notable collaborations with the director. She also appeared in Jiwhala and Hindi films including Balram Shri Krishna, Har Har Gange, Mata Mahakali and Rambhakt Hanuman. Her 1969 films included Dongarchi Maina and Gan Gaulan. During this period, she continued to work with leading Marathi actors such as Suryakant and Arun Sarnaik.

=== Mythological films and work across languages ===
During the 1970s, She increasingly appeared in mythological and devotional films, alongside her work in Marathi social and rural dramas. In 1970, she appeared in the Marathi film Gharkul and the Hindi film Bhagwan Parshuram, in which she portrayed Gayatri.

In 1971, she appeared in several Marathi and Hindi productions. Her Marathi films included Lakhat Ashi Dekhani, Kasa Kai Patil Bara Haay Ka, Ashich Ek Ratra and Tulsi Vivah, in which she portrayed Vrunda. Her Hindi films included Mata Vaishnodevi, Shree Krishnarjun Yuddha and Shri Krishna Leela, in which she portrayed mythological characters. She continued her association with devotional cinema in Naag Panchami (1972), playing Rajkumari Behula, and Hari Darshan (1972), in which she portrayed Goddess Lakshmi. Her Marathi films also included Pathrakhin, Shiv Bhagat Baba Balak Nath and Soon Ladaki Ya Gharchi.

In 1973, she appeared in the Marathi films Aai Ude Ga Ambabai and Mahasati Savitri, portraying the respective title characters. She also appeared in the Punjabi film Bhagat Dhanna Jatt. The following year, she portrayed Parvati in the Hindi mythological film Har Har Mahadev (1974). Her other Hindi films included Balak Dhruv, Kisan Aur Bhagwan and Dawat, while her Marathi films included Soon Mazi Savitri and Sugandhi Katta.

In 1975, she appeared in Ek Gaon Ki Kahani and the Marathi film Paach Rangachi Paach Pakhare. Her subsequent Hindi appearances included Bajrangbali (1976), in which she portrayed Sulochana, and Gayatri Mahima and Mahima Shree Ram Ki (1977). She also appeared in Adventures of Aladdin (1978) and Har Har Gange (1979). Her Marathi films during the latter part of the decade included Chandoba Chandoba Bhaglas Ka (1978) and Lage Bandhe (1979).

=== Character roles and television ===
During the 1980s, Gadkar continued to appear in Marathi and Hindi films, increasingly taking on character roles alongside her mythological performances. In 1980, she appeared in the Marathi film Zidd and Hindi films including Shiv Shakti, Savant and Saubhagyadaan. Her subsequent films included Soon Mazi Laxmi and Jiyo To Aise Jiyo (1981), followed by Aavhan and Sati Naag Kanya (1982).

In 1983, she portrayed Kunti in the Hindi mythological film Sampoorna Mahabharat. She subsequently appeared in Maya Bazaar, Naya Kadam, Shravan Kumar and Masterji (1984–1985). Her other Hindi appearances included Veer Bhimsen and Patton Ki Bazi (1986). In Marathi cinema, she appeared in Bijli (1986), followed by Sher Shivaji, Bhatak Bhavani, Antarpaat and Purnasatya (1987).

In 1987, Gadkar appeared in Ramanand Sagar's television series Ramayan, portraying Kaushalya, the mother of Lord Rama. Her husband, actor Bal Dhuri, portrayed King Dasharatha in the same series. The pairing became particularly memorable among television audiences. She also appeared in the television series Luv Kush (1988). Her later film appearances during the decade included Pandharichi Vari (1988), Shivganga and Mar Mitenge (1988), and Eeshwar and Kanoon Apna Apna (1989).

=== Directorial ventures and later career ===
During the 1990s, Gadkar continued appearing in films while also exploring filmmaking. Her Hindi film Amiri Garibi (1990) featured her as Janakidevi Bharadwaj. In Marathi cinema, she appeared in Maherchi Sadi, Mumbai Te Mauritius and Yeda Ki Khula (1991). Her subsequent films included Maal Masala (1992) and Ghayaal (1993).

She made her directorial debut with the Marathi film Sasar Maher (1994), in which she also acted. She subsequently directed Ashi Asavi Sasu (1996), in which she portrayed Savitribai Deshmukh. During this period, she also appeared in the Hindi film Jai Dhakshineshwari Kali Maa (1996) and the television production Lav Kush (1997), reprising her association with the character of Kaushalya. Her final film appearance was in the Marathi film Chimani Pakhar (2000), in which she portrayed Maithili Chaudhari.

== Death ==
Gadkar died on 29 August 2008 in Mumbai, Maharashtra, at the age of 66, following a brief illness. She had been bedridden before her death and passed away at around 3 a.m. Her funeral was held later that day at Chandanwadi crematorium in Mumbai. Her death was mourned by members of the Marathi film industry and several prominent personalities.

== Legacy ==
Gadkar is regarded as one of the greatest actresses of Marathi cinema. During the 1960s and early 1970s, she was among the highest paid actress. Two Biographies of Gadkar have been published, namely - Suvarna Nayika Jayshree Gadkar: Nakshatrache Lene by Bal Dhuri and Ashi Mi Jayshree in 1986.

== Filmography ==
=== Films ===
Year	Film	Role	Language	Notes
1954	Subah Ka Tara	Padmini	Hindi	
1955	Jhanak Jhanak Payal Baaje	Dancer	Hindi	Uncredited
1955	Savitri	Savitri's Sister	Hindi	
1956	Gaath Padli Thaka Thaka	Sister	Marathi	
1956	Disata Tasa Nasta	Kishori's Sister	Marathi	
1957	Aaliya Bhogasi	Seema's Sister	Marathi	
1959	Naya Sansar	Jayshree	Hindi	
1959	Ek Armaan Mera	Jaya	Hindi	
1959	Sangtye Aika	Hansa	Marathi	
1959	Madari	Kanchan	Hindi	
1959	Charnon Ki Dasi	Meera	Hindi	
1959	Do Gunde	Tulsi	Hindi	
1960	Police Detective	Herself	Hindi	Cameo
1960	Bindya	Nandini	Hindi	
1961	Avaghachi Sansar	Durga	Marathi	
1961	Pancharati	Indira	Marathi	
1961	Lagnala Jaato Me	Shanta	Marathi	
1961	Ram Lila	Lila	Marathi	
1961	Jai Bhawani	Bhawani	Marathi	
1961	Saranga	Saranga	Marathi	
1961	Manini	Malati	Marathi	
1961	Sasural	Gauri	Hindi	
1962	Baap Maza Brahmachari	Jana	Marathi	
1962	Sukh Aale Mazhya Daari	Jaya	Marathi	
1962	Private Secretary	Batashi & Veena	Hindi	
1962	Bhagyalaxmi	Bhagyalaxmi	Marathi	
1963	Subhadra Haran	Subhadra	Marathi	
1963	Padada	Veena	Marathi	
1963	Mohityanchi Manjula	Manjula Mohite	Marathi	
1963	Yeh Dil Kisko Doon	Champa	Hindi	
1963	Mere Armaan Mere Sapne	Prabha Mathur	Hindi	
1964	Mahasati Anusaya	Anusaya	Marathi	
1964	Kai Ho Chamatkar	Jiu	Marathi	
1964	Sawaal Majha Aika!	Anu	Marathi	
1964	Ek Don Teen	Ameeta	Marathi	
1965	Anmol Moti	Jaya	Marathi	
1965	Malhari Martand	Bakula	Marathi	
1965	Aai Kuna Mhanun Mee	Daughter	Marathi	
1965	Sadhi Mansa	Parvati Lokhande	Marathi	
1965	Gopal Krishna	Devi Maa Radha	Marathi	
1966	Veer Bajrang	Jayshree	Marathi	
1966	Pavnakathcha Dhondi	Bai	Marathi	
1966	Toofan Mein Pyaar Kahan	Pulma	Hindi	
1966	Patlachi Soon	Mrs. Patil	Marathi	
1967	Sangu Kashi Mi	Anu	Marathi	
1967	Thamb Laxmi Kunku Lavate	Laxmi	Marathi	
1967	Suranga Mhantyat Mala	Suranga	Marathi	
1967	Poonam Ka Chand	Poonam	Hindi	
1967	Baharon Ke Sapne	Sundari	Hindi	
1967	Lav-Kush	Sita	Hindi	
1968	Balram Shri Krishna	Subhadra	Hindi	
1968	Mata Mahakali	Mahakali	Hindi	
1968	Har Har Gange	Ganga	Hindi	
1968	Rambhakt Hanuman	Anjani	Hindi	
1968	Ek Gaav Bara Bhangadi	Phoola	Marathi	
1968	Jiwhala	Anuradha	Marathi	
1969	Dongarchi Maina	Maina	Hindi	
1969	Gan Gaulan	Gaulan	Hindi	
1970	Bhagwan Parshuram	Gayatri	Hindi	
1970	Dagabaaz	Aarti	Hindi	
1970	Gharkul	Aai	Marathi	
1971	Shree Krishnarjun Yuddha	Subhadra	Hindi	
1971	Mata Vaishnodevi	Vaishnodevi	Hindi	
1971	Ashich Ek Ratra	Shevanti & Roopa	Marathi	
1971	Tulsi Vivah	Vrunda	Marathi	
1971	Kasa Kai Patil Bara Haay Ka	Roopa	Marathi	
1971	Shri Krishna Leela	Yashoda	Hindi	
1971	Lakhat Ashi Dekhani	Chameli	Marathi	
1972	Shiv Bhagat Baba Balak Nath	Bhagat's Wife	Marathi	
1972	Soon Ladaki Ya Gharchi	Sasu	Marathi	
1972	Naag Panchami	Rajkumari Behula	Marathi	
1972	Pathrakhin	Laxmi	Marathi	
1973	Mahasati Savitri	Savitri	Marathi	
1973	Aai Ude Ga Ambabai	Ambabai	Marathi	
1973	Bhagat Dhanna Jatt	Kamli	Punjabi	
1974	Kisan Aur Bhagwan	Laxmi	Hindi	
1974	Har Har Mahadev	Parvati	Hindi	
1974	Dawat	Mrs. Sharma	Hindi	
1974	Balak Dhruv	Suniti	Hindi	
1974	Sugandhi Katta	Sugandha Satarkarin	Marathi	
1974	Soon Mazi Savitri	Savitri	Marathi	
1975	Paach Rangachi Paach Pakhare	Akka	Marathi	
1975	Ek Gaon Ki Kahani	Gangaram's wife	Hindi	
1976	Bajrangbali	Sulochana	Hindi	
1977	Mahima Shree Ram Ki	Sita	Hindi	
1977	Gayatri Mahima	Gayatri	Hindi	
1977	Jai Bolo Chakradhari	Mukta's Mother	Hindi	
1978	Adventures of Aladdin	Jayshree	Hindi	
1978	Chandoba Chandoba Bhaglas Ka	Aai	Marathi	
1979	Har Har Gange	Bhagirath's wife	Hindi	
1979	Ashtavinayak	Herself	Marathi	Special appearance in song "Ashtavinayaka"
1979	Lage Bandhe	Vahini	Marathi	
1980	Zidd	Konda	Marathi	
1980	Kadalakshmi	Ramabai	Marathi	
1980	Nishana	Janaki Devi	Hindi	
1980	Shiv Shakti	Shakti	Hindi	
1980	Saubhagyadaan	Doctor's Wife	Hindi	
1980	Savant	Mrs. Savant	Hindi	
1981	Soon Mazi Laxmi	Girija Vastad	Marathi	
1981	Jiyo To Aise Jiyo	Laxmi Sharma	Hindi	
1981	Sansani: The Sensation	Kamladevi Mathur	Hindi	
1981	Jay Tulja Bhavani	Tulja	Marathi	
1981	Baine Kela Sarpanch Khula	Sarpanch's Wife	Marathi	
1981	Alakh Niranjan	Mrs. Niranjan	Marathi	
1982	Aavhan	Aaisaheb	Marathi	
1982	Hari Darshan	Laxmi	Hindi	
1982	Sati Aur Bhagwan	Devi	Hindi	
1982	Thorli Jau	Prabhavati	Marathi	
1983	Sati Naag Kanya	Mandodari	Hindi	
1983	Sampoorna Mahabharat	Kunti	Hindi	
1983	He Daan Kunkwache	Radha	Marathi	
1984	Sulagte Armaan		Hindi	
1984	Sindoor Ka Daan		Hindi	
1984	Naya Kadam	Ramu's Mother	Hindi	
1984	Shravan Kumar	Annapurna	Hindi	
1984	Maya Bazar	Subhadra	Hindi	
1984	Zakhmi Waghin	Mrs. Patil	Marathi	
1984	Attaracha Phaya		Marathi	
1985	Masterji	Radha's Mother	Hindi	
1985	Devashappath Khara Sangen	Maasaheb Pawar	Marathi	
1985	Khichdi	Aaisaheb	Marathi	
1986	Krishna-Krishna	Susheela	Hindi	
1986	Patton Ki Bazi	Savitri Mausi	Hindi	
1986	Veer Bhimsen	Kunti	Hindi	
1986	Bijli	Chameli	Marathi	
1987	Khooni Darinda		Hindi	
1987	Nazrana	Parvati	Hindi	
1987	Sher Shivaji	Jijabai	Marathi	
1987	Bhatak Bhavani	Mrs. Salunkhe	Marathi	
1987	Antarpaat	Vijay's Mother	Marathi	
1987	Purnasatya	Mrs. P. Rao	Marathi	
1988	Shivganga	Parvati	Hindi	
1988	Pandharichi Vari	Akkasaheb	Marathi	
1988	Mar Mitenge	Mrs. Sharma	Hindi	
1989	Eeshwar	Rajeshwari Chaudhary	Hindi	
1989	Kanoon Apna Apna	College Principal	Hindi	
1990	Amiri Garibi	Janakidevi Bharadwaj	Hindi	
1991	Yeda Ki Khula	Aaisaheb Deshmukh	Marathi	
1991	Mumbai Te Mauritius	Yesu Sonu	Marathi	
1991	Maherchi Sadi	Laxmi's Mother	Marathi	
1992	Maal Masala	Mrs. Desai	Marathi	
1993	Ghayaal	Aabasaheb's Wife	Marathi	
1994	Sasar Maher	Mrs. Patil	Marathi	
1995	Gandh Mateela Aala	Bapurao's Mother	Marathi	
1996	Jai Dhakshineshwari Kali Maa	Thakurain	Hindi	
1996	Ashi Asavi Sasu	Savitribai Deshmukh (Baisaheb)	Marathi	
1997	Lav Kush	Kaushalya	Hindi	
2000	Chimani Pakhar	Maithili Chaudhari	Marathi	

=== Television ===
Year	Title	Role	Notes
1985	Singhasan Battisi	Brahmabhatt's Wife	TV Debut
1987-1988	Ramayan	Kausalya	
1988-1999	Luv Kush	Kausalya	

== Awards ==
- 1959 – Rasrang Phalke Puraskar for Best Actress for Sangte Aika.
- 1962 – Maharashtra State Film Award for Best Actress for Manini.
- 1963 – Maharashtra State Film Award for Best Actress for Sadhi Mansa.
- 1964 - Maharashtra State Film Award for Best Actress For Sawal Maza Aika.
- 1965 – Maharashtra State Film Award for Best Actress for Thamb Laxmi Kunku Lavte.
- 1971 – Maharashtra State Film Award for Best Special Appearance Actress for Gharkul.
- 1976 – Maharashtra State Film Award for Best Actress for Ghar Gangechya Kathi.
- 1998 – Lifetime Achievement Award from Ga. Di. Ma Puraskar
- 2003 – V. Shantaram Award from Government of Maharashtra
- 2003 – Lifetime Achievement Award from Zee Chitra Gaurav Puraskar.
