= Khooni Darinda =

1987 Hindi film

Khooni Darinda, released in 1987, is a Hindi horror film of Bollywood directed and produced by Dhirubhai Daxini. Lead singers of the film are Mohammed Rafi and Lata Mangeshkar.

== Production ==
The film was originally conceived around 1970 under the title Suraj Dhalne Ke Baad and had an audio release under that name. It was later shelved and subsequently completed with a different cast and crew before being released in 1987 under its current title.

== Cast ==
- Abhi Bhattacharya
- Jayshree Gadkar
- Mohan Choti
- Shaheeda Khan
- Nazima
- Master Bhagwan
- Shaminder Singh
- Smita Modi
- Santosh Bala
- Minu Khanna
- Rani Bangali

== Music ==
Ratandeep–Hemraj composed the songs whereas Agha Sarwar wrote them.

- "Aayega Koi Mere Paas" - Asha Bhosle
- "Jaa Raha Hai Pyaar Mera" - Krishna Kalle
- "Chanda Ko Chakor Karke" - N/A
- "Jaan-e-Jigar Dekh Idhar" - Mohammed Rafi, Manna Dey, Suman Kalyanpur
- "Mehfil Bhi Hai, Deewane Bhi" - Mohammed Rafi
