= Zee Chitra Gaurav Lifetime Achievement Award =

Cinema award in Marathi, India

Zee Chitra Gaurav Puraskar for Lifetime Achievement
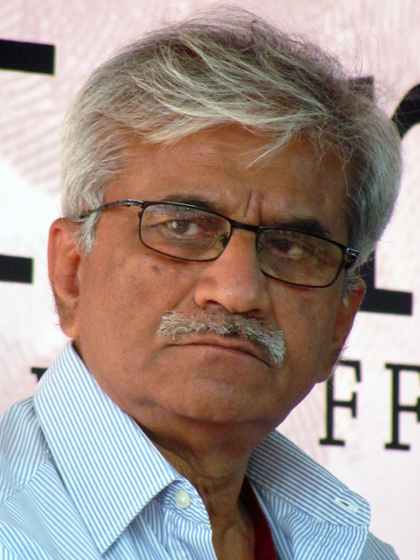
- The 2026 recipient: Jabbar Patel
- Awarded for: Commemorating an artist's career
- Country: India
- Presented by: Zee Marathi
- Currently held by: Jabbar Patel (2026)

The Zee Chitra Gaurav Lifetime Achievement Award is given by the Zee Marathi as part of its annual Zee Chitra Gaurav Puraskar for Marathi cinema.

== List of honourees ==
List of award recipients
Year	Image	Recipient	Field of work	Ref.
2000		Ramesh Deo	Actor	
2001		Sudhir Phadke	Music director	
2002		Ram Gabale	Film director	
2003		Jayshree Gadkar	Actress	
2004		Chittaranjan Kolhatkar	Actor	
2004		Vijaya Mehta	Actress, director	
2004		Prabhakar Panshikar	Actor	
2005		Chandrakant Gokhale	Actor	
2006		Nilu Phule	Actor	
2006		Shrinivas Khale	Music director	
2007		Shriram Lagoo	Actor	
2008		Suman Kalyanpur	Playback singer	
2008		Dashrath Pujari	Music director	
2009		N. S. Vaidya	Director, editor	
2009		Yashwant Dev	Music director, lyricist	
2010		S. N. Navre	Writer	
2010		Shahir Sable	Music director, playback singer, actor	
2011		Madhukar Toradmal	Actor, writer	
2011		Arun Kakade	Writer	
2012		Rajdutt	Film director	
2012		Sudha Karmarkar	Actress	
2013		Hridaynath Mangeshkar	Music director, playback singer	
2014		Shrikant Moghe	Actor	
2015		Sulochana Chavan	Playback singer	
2016		Leela Gandhi	Actress	
2017		Seema Deo	Actress	
2018		Asha Kale	Actress	
2018		Madhu Kambikar	Actress	
2019		Prabhakar Jog	Music director, violinist	
2020		Rohini Hattangadi	Actress	
2020		Dilip Prabhavalkar	Actor	
2021	Not awarded			
2022		Pushpa Pagdhare	Playback singer	
2023		Ashok Saraf	Actor	
2024	Usha_Naik,_Actor_and_Shrihari_Sathe,_Producer_of_the_film_‘EK_HAZARACHI’,_at_a_press_conference,_at_the_45th_International_Film_Festival_of_India_(IFFI-2014),_in_Panaji,_Goa_on_November_29,_2014	Usha Mangeshkar	Playback singer	
2025		Nivedita Saraf	Actress	
2026		Jabbar Patel	Director	
