= Banarsi Thug =

1962 film

- Poster
- Directed by: Lekhraj Bhakri
- Starring: Manoj Kumar; Vijaya Chaudhari; I. S. Johar; Lalita Pawar
- Music by: Iqbal Qureshi
- Production company: NH Studioz
- Release date: 15 May 1962
- Country: India
- Language: Hindi

Banarsi Thug (lit. 'The Thief of Banaras') is 1962 Hindi drama film directed by Lekhraj Bhakri. It stars Manoj Kumar and I. S. Johar as leads. The film has music by Iqbal Qureshi.

== Cast ==
- Manoj Kumar as Shyam
- Vijaya Chaudhari as Koili
- I. S. Johar as Veer Banarasi
- Lalita Pawar
- Malika as Mala
- Brahm Bhardwaj
- Radha krishan
- Gopal Sehgal as Ramu
- Soda Water
- Shukla
- Renu Maker
- Madhu Mati
- Jeevan Kala
- Vijay Dutt as Guest Artist

== Soundtrack ==
The film had music composed by Iqbal Qureshi and its songs were written by five lyricists namely Prem Dhawan, Gulshan Bawra, Hasrat Romani, Akhtar Lucknow and Aziz Qaisi. Playback was done by Mohammad Rafi, Lata Mangeshkar and others.
