= Cha Cha Cha (1964 film) =

- Original poster
- Directed by: Chandrashekhar
- Starring: Chandrashekhar; Helen
- Music by: Iqbal Qureshi
- Release date: 1964
- Country: India
- Language: Hindi

Cha Cha Cha is an Indian romance film, released in 1964. The script is by Chandrashekhar, who also directed the film and plays the lead male role. It also features Helen in her first leading role.

The cast also includes Om Prakash, Leela Mishra, Iftekhar, O. P. Ralhan and Tun Tun. Music in the film was composed by Iqbal Qureshi. The song "Subah Na Aayi Shaam Na Aayi", was written by the then new songwriter, Neeraj, and Makhdoom Mohiuddin's poem "Chara Gar" is depicted in the song "Ek Chameli Ke Mandwe Tale", which tells the story of two lovers who can never be together.

== Plot ==
Lali, played by Helen, returns home from abroad, disappointing her mother with her new attitudes, looks, and affinity to dance. After reluctantly making a trip to the temple at the request of her mother, Lali assumes that the man (Puran) singing in the temple, is referring to her in the lyrics of his song. In response, and to the surprise of onlookers, she slaps him, only to shortly discover that he is blind and was singing a religious song. Feeling guilty, and with the support of her family, Puran is taken to Mumbai (then Bombay), and regains his eyesight following eye surgery paid for by Lali's family.

Lali's character soon changes. Unable to persuade Puran to learn Western dance, she assumes traditional dress and the two fall in love. However, she is subsequently persuaded by her father to marry a wealthy businessman and end the relationship with Puran for the sake of family honour in light of her upcoming sister's marriage, as Puran, being of a "harijan" caste, is deemed unsuitable for her by her parents.

When she is struck by a disability, her husband leaves her. Puran in the meantime becomes a singing/dancing hero.

== Cast ==
The cast includes:

- Chandrashekhar as Puranchan Kashmiri "Puran"
- Helen as Lali
- Om Prakash as Dinanath (Lali's Father)
- Leela Mishra as Laxmi (Lali's Mother)
- Agha as Lali's Brother
- Iftekhar as Family Doctor
- O. P. Ralhan as Madan
- Polson as Mohan
- Mac Mohan as Sushil
- Tun Tun as Mohan's mother
- Bela Bose as Kalpana
- Aruna Irani as Geeta
- Madan Puri as Dance Announcer

== Production ==
The script was written by Chandrashekhar, who directed the film and played the lead male role. It was released in 1964.

== Music ==
Music in the film was composed by Iqbal Qureshi. Performances in the film include the dance sequence "Cha Cha Cha", and the song "Subah Na Aayi Shaam Na Aayi", written by the then new songwriter Neeraj. The film also includes Makhdoom Mohiuddin's poem "Chara Gar" depicted in the song "Ek Chameli Ke Mandwe Tale", which tells the story of two lovers who can never be together. This song was sung by Mohammed Rafi and Asha Bhosle.

Song	Singer
"Subah Na Aayi"	Mohammed Rafi
"Woh Hum Na The"	Mohammed Rafi
"Ek Lali Ghar Se Chali"	Mohammed Rafi
"Ek Chameli Ke Mandwe Tale"	Mohammed Rafi, Asha Bhosle
"Tumse, Mano Na Mano, Mujhe Tumse Pyar Ho Gaya"	Mohammed Rafi, Asha Bhosle
"Dance Music"	Iqbal Qureshi
"Title Music"	Iqbal Qureshi

== Reception and legacy ==
The film was one of Helen's few successes in a leading role. Filmfare described Helen as someone "who slides across the film with the grace of a leopardess, whose femininity and quiet behaviour are in pleasing in contrast to Bela Bose's enthusiastic flaunting of over-emphasised charms".

Kate Spade noted in her 2013 Cha Cha Cha timeline that in 1964 "Bollywood is hit with Cha Cha Cha fever".
