= Yeh Dil Kisko Doon =

1963 film

- Directed by: Kanak Mishra
- Written by: Kanak Mishra
- Screenplay by: Kanak Mishra
- Produced by: B. D. Kapoor
- Starring: Shashi Kapoor; Ragini; Agha; Jeevan; Anwar
- Narrated by: Ameen Sayani
- Cinematography: Aloke Dasgupta
- Edited by: Nand Kumar
- Music by: Iqbal Qureshi
- Production company: Bindu Kala Mandir
- Release date: 1963
- Country: India
- Language: Hindi

Yeh Dil Kisko Doon is a 1963 Bollywood Romantic comedy film. The film had Shashi Kapoor, Ragini, Agha, Jeevan, and Anwar in lead roles. The film is known for its music and songs.

== Cast ==
- Shashi Kapoor as Anand / Raja
- Ragini as Sherry
- Agha as Raja / Pandu
- Jayshree Gadkar as Champa
- Jeevan as Master

== Soundtrack ==
The songs for the film was composed by Iqbal Qureshi.

| Song | Singer |
|---|---|
| "Yeh Dil Kisko Doon, Yeh Dil Kisko Doon" | Mohammed Rafi |
| "Mera Dil Tumpe Aa Gaya" | Mohammed Rafi |
| "Phir Aane Laga Yaad Wahi Pyar Ka Alam" | Mohammed Rafi, Usha Khanna |
| "Kitni Haseen Ho Tum, Kitni Haseen Ho Tum" | Mohammed Rafi, Asha Bhosle |
| "Tera Naam, Mera Naam, Lakhon Mitaye Koi" | Mohammed Rafi, Asha Bhosle |
| "Kya Hua Maine Agar Ishq Ka Izhaar Kiya" | Mohammed Rafi, Asha Bhosle |
| "Hamen Dum Daike Souten Ghar Jana" | Mubarak Begum, Asha Bhosle |
| "Main Gawalan Chatki" | Asha Bhosle |
| "Wah Re Dildaar Banke Tum Par" | Asha Bhosle |
| "Main Hoon Pyare Teri Deewani" | Asha Bhosle |
