= Parshuram Mandir, Gunj =

Parshuram Mandir in Thane

Shree Parshuram Mandir
- श्री परशुराम मंदिर

Religion
- Affiliation: Hinduism
- District: Palghar
- Deity: Lord Parshuram

Location
- Location: Mandakini hills, Gunj village
- State: Maharashtra
- Country: India
- Interactive map of Shree Parshuram Mandir
- Coordinates: 19.5460824°N 73.0548049°E

Architecture
- Founder: Shilahara Dynasty
- Established: 9th–13th century

The Parshuram Mandir (Marathi: श्री परशुराम मंदिर) at the Gunj village is an ancient temple dedicated to Lord Parshuram in the Thane district of Maharashtra. It is located in the Wada taluka of the district. It is at a distance of 60 kilometres from the city of Thane. It is situated on the Mandakini hills at the village. It was built by the kings of Shilahar dynasty during the period of 9th–13th century CE in the region. It is locally also called as Bhargav Mandir. It is said that the temple was plundered hundreds of years ago by the Mughals. It was become ruins. The revelation of the temple was made by the senior BJP leader Om Prakash Sharma. The temple was later renovated. Presently, the temple is well-maintained and painted.

== Description ==
Earlier the temple was an abandoned and ruined temple. The temple is estimated to be about 600 to 700 years old. It is built entirely of red stone. It is a north facing temple. The temple is divided into two parts, the sanctum sanctorum (Garbhgriha) and the cloister. There are three doors in three directions to enter the sanctum sanctorum.

The temple's main hall is small. There is an idol of Lord Parshuram also called Bhargava Ram enshrined in an arch-shaped stone (mahirpit) on the square. A garland of flowers is carved around its neck. The idol of Bhargava Ram is wearing a yellow pitambar.
