= Balak Dhruv =

- Directed by: Himmat Dave
- Release date: 1974
- Country: India
- Language: Hindi

Balak Dhruv is a 1974 Bollywood drama film directed by Himmat Dave.

== Cast ==
- Master Satyajeet ... Bhakta Dhruv
- Jayshree Gadkar as Suniti
- Jeevan as Narad Muni
- Master Alankar as Uttam
- Mahipal
- Bhagwan
- Abhi Bhattacharya as Uttanapada
- S.N. Tripathi
- Sathyajyoti as Suruchi

== Soundtrack ==
All songs were composed by Govind–Naresh and penned by Madan Bharti.

1. "Hari Sumeeran Kar Lije Manva" (version 1) – Mohammed Rafi
2. "Hari Sumeeran Kar Lije Manva" (version 1) – Mohammed Rafi
3. "Hriday Mein Hazaaron" – N/A
4. "Le Le Barat Bhole Baba" – Aparna Mayekar, Krishna Kalle
5. "Naagan Hu Main Chandan Ban Ki" – Asha Bhosle
6. "He Jag Ke Bhagwan Aao Aao Mujhe Apnao" – Asha Bhosle
7. "Ruk Jaao Naag Devta" – Krishna Kalle
