= Dharani (Hinduism) =

Hindu goddess

- Affiliation: Devi, Lakshmi, Bhumi
- Consort: Parshurama

Dharani (Sanskrit: धरणी) is a Hindu goddess a manifestation of the mother goddess Lakshmi. In Vaishnavism. She is described as the divine consort of Parashurama, the sixth Avatar of Vishnu.

According to the theology of the Vishnu Purana (Book 1, Chapter 9), whenever Lord Vishnu descends to the mortal world as an avatar, Goddess Lakshmi manifests alongside him in a complementary form:

"When Hari is born as a mortal, she takes a human form. When he is born as a sage, she becomes his companion."

== Association with Bhudevi ==
Scholars of Hindu mythology note that Dharani's name and characterization closely parallel Bhūmi (the Earth goddess), consort of Varaha, the third avarar of Vishnu, and an aspect of Lakshmi in Sri Vaishnavism. Because Parashurama's legend involves reclaiming land from the ocean (such as the Konkan and Malabar regions) and donating the Earth to Sage Kashyapa after vanquishing Kshatriya tyranny, Dharani symbolically represents the sanctified Earth associated with his mission.

== See also ==
- Lakshmi
- Parashurama
- Bhūmi
- Dashavatara
