= Iqbal Qureshi =

Indian music composer and director

- Born: 12 May 1930; Aurangabad, British India
- Died: 21 March 1998 (aged 67); Mumbai, India
- Occupations: Music composer and director

Iqbal Qureshi (12 May 1930 – 21 March 1998) was an Indian music composer and director, credited with film scores for several Hindi films between 1958 and 1986, best known for his music to the song "Ek Chameli Ke Mandve Tale" in the film Cha Cha Cha (1964), the first Indian film to feature Western dance.

His interest in music began as a child when he sang for private gatherings and for All India Radio. He became involved in the Indian People's Theatre Association when he moved to Mumbai as an adult and began to direct music for dramas.

His first credit was for composing music for the film Panchayat (1958), and subsequent films included Bindiya (1960), Love in Simla (1960), Banarsi Thug (1962) and then Yeh Dil Kisko Doon (1963). His compositions have included music for songs sung by Mohammed Rafi, Mukesh, Mahendra Kapoor, and three Mangeshkar sisters; Lata, Asha and Usha. His music has provided the sound to lyrics by Makhdoom Mohiuddin, Neeraj and Kaifi Azmi. Actors including Helen, Joy Mukherjee, Sadhana, Manoj Kumar and Shashi Kapoor have performed to his tunes.

His later work included composing the music in Alam Ara (1973), the remake of the first Indian talkie film Alam Ara (1931).

== Early life ==
Iqbal Qureshi was born on 12 May 1930 in Aurangabad (now in Maharashtra), and later moved to Hyderabad. As a child he performed for All India Radio. Prior to entering the film industry, he sang at private gatherings and was friends with the poet Makhdoom Mohiuddin and actor/director Chandrashekhar. When he subsequently moved to Mumbai (then known as Bombay), he became involved in directing dramas for the Indian People's Theatre Association. He was taller than six feet and had long hair.

== Career ==
Qureshi is credited with several film scores. These have included music to songs sung by Mohammed Rafi, Mukesh, Mahendra Kapoor, Mubarak Begum, and three Mangeshkar sisters; Lata, Asha and Usha. His music has provided the sound to lyrics by Makhdoom Mohiuddin, Neeraj, and Kaifi Azmi. Actors including Helen, Joy Mukherjee, Sadhana, Manoj Kumar and Shashi Kapoor have performed to his tunes.

He composed music for 10 songs in the 1958 film Panchayat, in which he combined folk and classical music and promoted the use of the been and the kanch tarang glass instrument in the song "Tha Thaiya Karke Aana". The duet was sung by Lata Mangeshkar and Geeta Dutt.

In 1960, he composed music for two films; Bindiya and Love in Simla, both with songs written by Rajendra Krishan and sung by Mohammed Rafi. The tunes to two of these songs, "Main Apne Aap Se Ghabra Gaya Hoon" and "Yoon zindagi ke raaste sanwaarte chale gaye" showed how Rafi could reach high pitched notes. Qureshi's "Gaal Gulabi Kiske Hain" in Love in Simla, sung by Rafi and starring the then new actor Joy Mukherjee, was hummed for years to come.

The following year he composed music for the film Umar Qaid, which included the sad ghazal "Mujhe raat din ye khayaal hai, woh nazar se mujhko gira na dein", written by Hasrat and sung by Mukesh.

In 1963, Qureshi produced the music for the song "Hamen Dam Dai Ke" sung by Mubarak Begum and Asha Bhosle, for the film Yeh Dil Kisko Doon, which saw the debut of Shashi Kapoor.

He composed and directed the music for Chandrashekhar's 1964 film Cha Cha Cha, which featured Helen in her first leading role. The film included the song "Subah Na Aayi Shaam Na Aayi", written by the then new songwriter Neeraj, and sung by Rafi. From that film, he became best known for composing the music to Makhdoom Mohiuddin's poem "Chara Gar", depicted in the song "Ek Chameli Ke Mandve Tale", which tells the story of two lovers who can never be together. The music was described by Indian film music historian Manek Premchand as Qureshi's "best efforts".

After 1964, the films he contributed to were not as successful. He composed the music in Alam Ara (1973), the remake of the first Indian talkie film Alam Ara (1931). By 1986, he had directed the music for 25 Hindi films.

== Death ==
Qureshi died at home in Vile Parle, Mumbai, on 21 March 1998, weeks after giving a television interview.

== Selected filmography ==
Year	Film/album	Song/music	Notes	Reference
1958	Panchayat	"Tha thaiya karte aana"	Sung by Lata and Geeta.	
1958	Panchayat	"Aaye aaye bahar aaj re karke solah sringar"		
1958	Panchayat	"Haal ye kah kar diya zalim, tere tadpane ne"		
1960	Bindiya	"Itna na sata ki koi jaane o deewaane"	Sung by Lata	
1960	Bindiya	"Main apne aap se ghabra gaya hoon"	Sung by Rafi	
1960	Bindiya	"Nasha sa chha gaya sanam tere pyaar ka"	Sung by Lata	
1960	Love in Simla	"Dar pe aaye hain kasam le"		
1960	Love in Simla	"Love ka matlab hai pyaar"	Sung by Asha/Rafi	
1960	Love in Simla	"Yoon zindagi ke raaste sanwaarte chale gaye"	Sung by Rafi	
1960	Love in Simla	"Ae baby ae jee idhar aao, aa gaya		
1960	Love in Simla	"Kiya hai dilruba pyaar kabhi"		
1960	Love in Simla	"Gaal gulabi kiske hain"		
1961	Umar Qaid	"Dil ka fasana koi na jana"	Sung by Mahendra Kapoor/Asha	
1961	Umar Qaid	"Mujhe raat din ye khayaal hai, o nazar se mujhko gira na de"	Sung by Mukesh	
1961	Umar Qaid	"O piya jaana na"	Asha	
1962	Banarsi Thug	"Ik baat poochhta hoon"	Sung by Mukesh, Usha Mangeshkar	
1962	Banarsi Thug	"Yaad suhaani teri bani zindagaani meri"	Sung by Lata	
1962	Banarsi Thug	"Aaj mausam ki masti mein gaaye pawan"	Sung by Lata/Rafi	
1962	Banarsi Thug	"Ab mohabbat mein jo pehli thi wo taasir nahi"	Sung by Rafi	
1963	Yeh Dil Kisko Doon	"Hamen dam dai ke"	Sung by Mubarak Begum/Asha Bhosle	
1963	Yeh Dil Kisko Doon	"Kitni haseen ho tum"	Sung by Asha/Rafi	
1963	Yeh Dil Kisko Doon	"Phir aane laga yaad wohi"	Sung by Rafi/Usha Khanna	
1963	Yeh Dil Kisko Doon	"Jab tak duniya rahi rahega"	Sung by Asha/Rafi	
1964	Cha Cha Cha	"Ek chameli ke mandve tale"	Lyrics by Mohiuddin and sung by Asha/Rafi	
1964	Cha Cha Cha	"Wo hum na the woh tum na the"	Sung by Rafi	
1964	Cha Cha Cha	"Subah na aayi sham na aayi"	Sung by Rafi	
1964	Cha Cha Cha	Cha Cha Cha dance competition	Instrumental	
1964	Qawwali Ki Raat	"Jaate jaate ek nazar bhar dekh lo"		
1964	Qawwali Ki Raat	"Husn wale husn ka anjaam dekh "	Sung by Asha/Rafi	
1967	Pyar Bana Afsaana	"Mere jahan mein tum pyar leke aaye"		
1973	Alam Ara	"Parvardigara"		
1973	Alam Ara	"Suno fariyaad tum meri moinuddin Azmeri"		
