= Gayatri Mahima =

Gayathri mahima
- Directed by: Harsukh Jagneshwar Bhatt
- Release date: 1977
- Country: India
- Language: Hindi

Gayatri Mahima is a 1977 Bollywood film directed by Harsukh Jagneshwar Bhatt.

== Cast ==
- Bharat Bhushan
- Jayshree Gadkar
- Ashish Kumar (actor)
- Jaya Kausalya
- Chandrashekhar
- Padma Khanna
- Tun Tun
- Abhi Bhattacharya
- D.K. Sapru
- Master Alankar

== Soundtrack ==
1. "Gayatri Ke Mahamantra Se Jivan Ke Sab Paap Haro" – Manna Dey
2. "Anand Mangal Karu Aarti Jai Gayatri Mata" – Mukesh
3. "Deepak Hai Tu Piya Mai Teri Jyoti" – Asha Bhosle, Mohammed Rafi
4. "Saanchi Ho Lagan Jo Mann Me, Dukh Dard Mite Jo Pal Chhin Me" – Mohammed Rafi
5. "O Maa Teri Mamta" – Lata Mangeshkar
6. "Sajna O Sajna" – Usha Mangeshkar
