= Deivapiravi (1960 film) =

1960 film by Krishnan–Panju

- Theatrical release poster
- Directed by: Krishnan–Panju
- Written by: K. S. Gopalakrishnan
- Starring: Sivaji Ganesan; Padmini; S. S. Rajendran
- Cinematography: S. Maruti Rao
- Edited by: S. Panjabi
- Music by: R. Sudarsanam
- Production company: Kamaal Brothers
- Release date: 13 April 1960
- Running time: 182 minutes
- Country: India
- Language: Tamil

Deivapiravi (transl. Noble Soul) is a 1960 Indian Tamil-language film directed by Krishnan–Panju. The film stars Sivaji Ganesan, Padmini, S. S. Rajendran, K. A. Thangavelu and M. N. Rajam. It was dubbed and released in Telugu as Anumanam on 24 June 1961. At the 8th National Film Awards, the film won the All India Certificate of Merit for the Third Best Feature Film. It was also remade in Hindi in the same year under the title Bindya.

== Plot ==
Madhavan is a construction supervisor for Saminatha Pillai. He loves Thangam, a construction worker, and marries her. They live together with his younger brother Manohar and Thangam's mother and her younger brother Ramu. Pillai tells Madhavan that he noticed Manohar trying to steal and Ramu stopping him. Madhavan punishes Manohar and Thangam takes responsibility to reform Manohar while Madhavan takes responsibility for Ramu.

Years later, Madhavan, with Pillai's help, becomes rich. Now in college, Ramu concentrates on his studies while Manohar indulges in vices. Thilagam, Pillai's daughter, loves Ramu. Before dying, Thangam's mother advises her to always obey Madhavan and never leave the house under any circumstances. Nair loses his tea business and Madhavan appoints Nair as the family's cook. Pillai wants Thilagam to marry Ramu, but Ramu feels he should first find a job and earn money.

One day, two ladies visit Madhavan: his father's mistress and her daughter Nandhini bearing a letter from his deceased father. Madhavan permits them to reside in his old house, but does not disclose the truth to Thangam. Madhavan brings Nandhini to work at his house. Nandhini complains about Nair to Madhavan's tenant who alleges that Thangam and Nair were in a relationship for many years. Thangam discovers that Madhavan has bought jewels for Nandhini and becomes suspicious of their relationship. Manohar, jealous to see Ramu and Thilagam together, requests Thangam to organize his marriage with Thilagam to prove that she is unbiased. To prove it, Thangam convinces Ramu to sacrifice his love for Thilagam. But Thilagam and Pillai refuse her proposal. Nandhini abuses her emotional bond with Madhavan to spoil Thangam's reputation. Thangam notices Madhavan and Nandhini inside a closed room and suspects their relationship. Madhavan and Thangam begin to distrust each other.

Madhavan meets Pillai to learn what Thangam told him. However, Pillai, who is tense with other matters, asks Madhavan to leave as he does not wish to discuss the marriage proposal, blaming Thangam for her inconsistency.

That night, Thangam informs Madhavan that after twelve years of marriage, she is pregnant and he shows his affection. Madhavan's step-mother stages a drama and makes him take them to his home and they both emotionally torture Thangam. Manohar is angry with Ramu and decides to kill him. But Ramu says he will not oppose Manohar's marriage plans and decides to leave for Mumbai for a job. Manohar visits Thilagam and steals her diamond ring. Later, Ramu visits Thilagam to bid her farewell. Pillai files a police complaint about the missing diamond ring. With a friend's help, Manohar drops the ring in Ramu's shirt to shift the blame on him. The police find the ring in Ramu's shirt and Pillai is shocked but Thilagam does not accept it, stating Ramu had no need to steal the ring as there was also money in the cupboard.

Pillai accepts her logic and effects Ramu's release on bail. Nandhini and her mother order Thangam to leave the house. Ramu arrives at that moment and argues with Madhavan. Madhavan accuses Ramu of being a thief and Thangam, a prostitute. Because of the torture by Nandhini and her mother, Thangam writes a suicide note to Thilagam and leaves.

On returning home, Madhavan overhears Nandhini and her mother discussing their scheming against Thangam. He realizes Thangam's goodness. Thilagam arrives with Thangam's suicide note and she accompanies Madhavan to prevent it. Madhavan stops Thangam and Ramu, who was trying to kill himself and apologizes for his mistakes. Manohar confesses to having stolen Thilagam's ring and begs Thangam to return. The police arrest Nandhini and her mother for the theft. However, Thangam states it was gifted to them and effects their release. They seek forgiveness from Madhavan and Thangam. Ramu marries Thilagam.

== Cast ==
- Sivaji Ganesan as Madhavan
- Padmini as Thangam
- S. S. Rajendran as Ramu
- K. A. Thangavelu
- M. N. Rajam as Thilagam
- M. S. Sundari Bai
- Tambaram Lalitha as Nandhini
- M. Saroja as Arundhathi
- Kallapart Natarajan as Manohar
- K. Sarangapani as Saminatha Pillai
- A. Karunanidhi as Nair
- Radhabhai as Thangam and Ramu's mother
- P. S. Gnanam
- K. S. Angamuthu
- S. Rama Rao
- S. P. Muthuraman as Angamuthu's son

== Production ==
Deivapiravi was written by K. S. Gopalakrishnan. A writer accused him of story theft and Gopalakrishnan was taken to court, but was exonerated after his story was found to be original. S. P. Muthuraman who went on to become a popular director made his acting debut with this film portraying a small role of Angamuthu's son.

== Soundtrack ==
The music was composed by R. Sudarsanam. The lyrics were written by Thanjai N. Ramaiah Dass, Udumalai Narayana Kavi, Kavi Rajagopal and K. S. Gopalakrishnan.

Song	Singers	Lyrics	Length
"Anbale Thediya En"	C. S. Jayaraman & S. Janaki	Udumalai Narayana Kavi	03:55
"Thaara Thaara Vandhaaraa"	K. Jamuna Rani	Udumalai Narayana Kavi	02:26
"Thannaitthaane Nambaadhadhu"	C. S. Jayaraman	Udumalai Narayana Kavi	04:10
"Atho Keerathanaa.... Manidhanai Manidhan"	Seerkazhi Govindarajan	K. S. Gopalakrishnan	10:20
"Kattadatthukku Manai Poruttham"	S. C. Krishnan & L. R. Eswari	K. S. Gopalakrishnan	05:00
"Vayasu Pennai Marandhidalaamaa"	T. M. Soundararajan & Soolamangalam Rajalakshmi	Thanjai N. Ramaiah Dass	05:24
"Kaalai Vayasu Kattaana Saisu"	K. Jamuna Rani	Thanjai N. Ramaiah Dass	04:05
"Ivar Kaanaa Avar Paanaa"	K. Jamuna Rani	Kavi Rajagopal	04:00

== Release and reception ==
Deivapiravi was released on 13 April 1960. The Indian Express praised the performances of the lead actors, and called Thangavelu's comedy a major attraction. The film was a success, running for over 100 days in theatres.

== Remakes ==
Before AVM Productions remade Deivapiravi in Hindi as Bindya in the same year, Ganesan advised them not to remake the film as he felt it would not come well. However AVM ignored him and went on to make the film in Hindi. Bindya was a failure and many years later, M. Saravanan expressed regret for ignoring Ganesan's advice.

== Bibliography ==
- Muthuraman, S. P. (2017) [2005]. AVM Thandha SPM (in Tamil) (3rd ed.). Vikatan. OCLC 607342391.
