= Bindya =

- Poster
- Directed by: Krishnan–Panju
- Story by: K. S. Gopalakrishnan
- Produced by: M. Saravanan
- Starring: Balraj Sahni; Padmini
- Music by: Iqbal Qureshi
- Production company: AVM Productions
- Release date: 29 December 1960
- Country: India
- Language: Hindi

Bindya (transl. The Vermilion Mark) is a 1960 Indian Hindi-language drama film directed by Krishnan–Panju and produced by M. Saravanan. It is a remake of the Tamil film Deivapiravi, released early the same year. The film stars Balraj Sahni, Padmini and Jagdeep. It was released on 29 December 1960, and failed to replicate the success of the Tamil original.

== Plot ==
After the passing of their parents, Devraj lives with his much younger brother, Ramu, in a small town in India. He marries Bindya, who moves in along with her mom, and brother, Raju. Devraj, who works with Rai Saheb Kedarnath, gets a promotion as a Government Contractor, and they move into a bigger house. Years later, Raju and Ramu have grown up, and Bindya's mom has passed on. While Raju has taken to petty crime and bad company, Ramu is more focused on his studies and has good sober habits. Devraj would like Raju to marry Rama, Kedarnath's daughter, but he subsequently finds out that she has fallen in love with Ramu. This news is met with anger by Raju, who swears to avenge this humiliation. Devraj's stepmother, Mrs. Ramnath, and her daughter, Nandini, move in with them - thus ending their idyllic lifestyle - with Devraj suspecting Bindya of having an affair with their cook, Chandan, and Bindya thinking that Devraj is having an affair with Nandini. Things get bad to worse, when Ramu is accused of stealing a diamond ring from Kedarnath's house, and the police are summoned.

== Cast ==
- Balraj Sahni as Devraj
- Padmini as Bindya
- Jagdeep as Ramu
- Vijaya Chaudhary as Rama
- Achala Sachdev as Bindya's mother
- Lalita Pawar as Mrs. Ramnath (Devraj's stepmother)
- David as Rai Sahib Kedarnath
- Jayshree Gadkar as Nandini
- Om Prakash as Shastri
- Minoo Mumtaz as Priyadarshini
- Rajendranath as Chandan

== Production ==
Following the success of the Tamil film Deivapiravi (1960), producer M. Saravanan wanted to remake the film in Hindi. Deivapiravi star Sivaji Ganesan advised him against doing so, feeling it would not come well. Saravanan ignored Ganesan's advice, and remade the film in that language with the title Bindya. Krishnan–Panju, the directors of Deivapiravi, returned to direct the remake.

== Soundtrack ==
The soundtrack was composed by Iqbal Qureshi. The song "Main Apne Aap Se Ghabra Gaya Hoon" attained popularity.

Songs	Singer
"Itna Na Sata Ki Koi Jane"	Lata Mangeshkar
"Nasha Sa Chha Gaya"	Lata Mangeshkar
"Khwab Mein Kahan Miloge, Kis Liye Ji"	Lata Mangeshkar, Mohammed Rafi
"Tane Tandane Bhai Tandane Tane"	Asha Bhosle, Mohammed Rafi
"Main Apne Aap Se"	Mohammed Rafi
"Dekhiye, Yun Na Sharmaiyega"	Usha Khanna, Mukesh

== Release and reception ==
Bindya was released on 29 December 1960. The film failed to replicate the success of the Tamil original, and Saravanan later regretted ignoring Ganesan's advice. However, in a review dated 11 August 1961, The Indian Express praised the performances of Sahni, Padmini, Jagdeep, Lalitha Pawar and Om Prakash.
