= Bhagwan Parshuram =

1970 film

- Directed by: Babubhai Mistry
- Produced by: N. D. Kothari
- Starring: Abhi Bhattacharya; Jayshree Gadkar; Jeevan
- Music by: Jayram
- Release date: 1970
- Country: India
- Language: Hindi

Bhagwan Parshuram is a 1970 Indian Hindi language drama film directed by Babubhai Mistry. The film stars Abhi Bhattacharya and Jayshree Gadkar in lead roles.

== Plot ==
This is the story of Lord Parshuram, who beheads his mother in the beginning to prove the duty as directed by his father.

== Cast ==
- Abhi Bhattacharya as Parshuram
- Jayshree Gadkar as Gayetri
- Jeevan as Bhagwan Shri Narad Muni
- Trilok Kapoor
- D.K. Sapru as Samrat
- Sulochana as Renuka
- Sunder as Samrat's employee
- Helen as an item number

== Soundtrack ==
Serial	Song title	Singer(s)
1	"Dans Gayi Nagin"	Krishna Kalle and Mahendra Kapoor
2	"Jaanewale Piya"	Asha Bhosle
3	"Jabse Gaya Ladakpan"	Lata Mangeshkar
4	"Koi Roye Koi Gaaye"	Mukesh
5	"Mere Mann Ke"	Asha Bhosle
6	"Nain Mere Barse"	Hemlata

== Remakes ==
It was originally made a Telugu movie, from Renuka's perspective as Renukadevi Mahatmyam in 1960, which was dubbed into Hindi as Sati Renuka in 1961, and again remade in Kannada as Sri Renukadevi Mahatme in 1977, which was dubbed in Hindi as Veer Parshuram.
