= Parshuram Temple, Chiplun =

Hindu temple at Chiplun, Ratnagiri district, Maharashtra, India

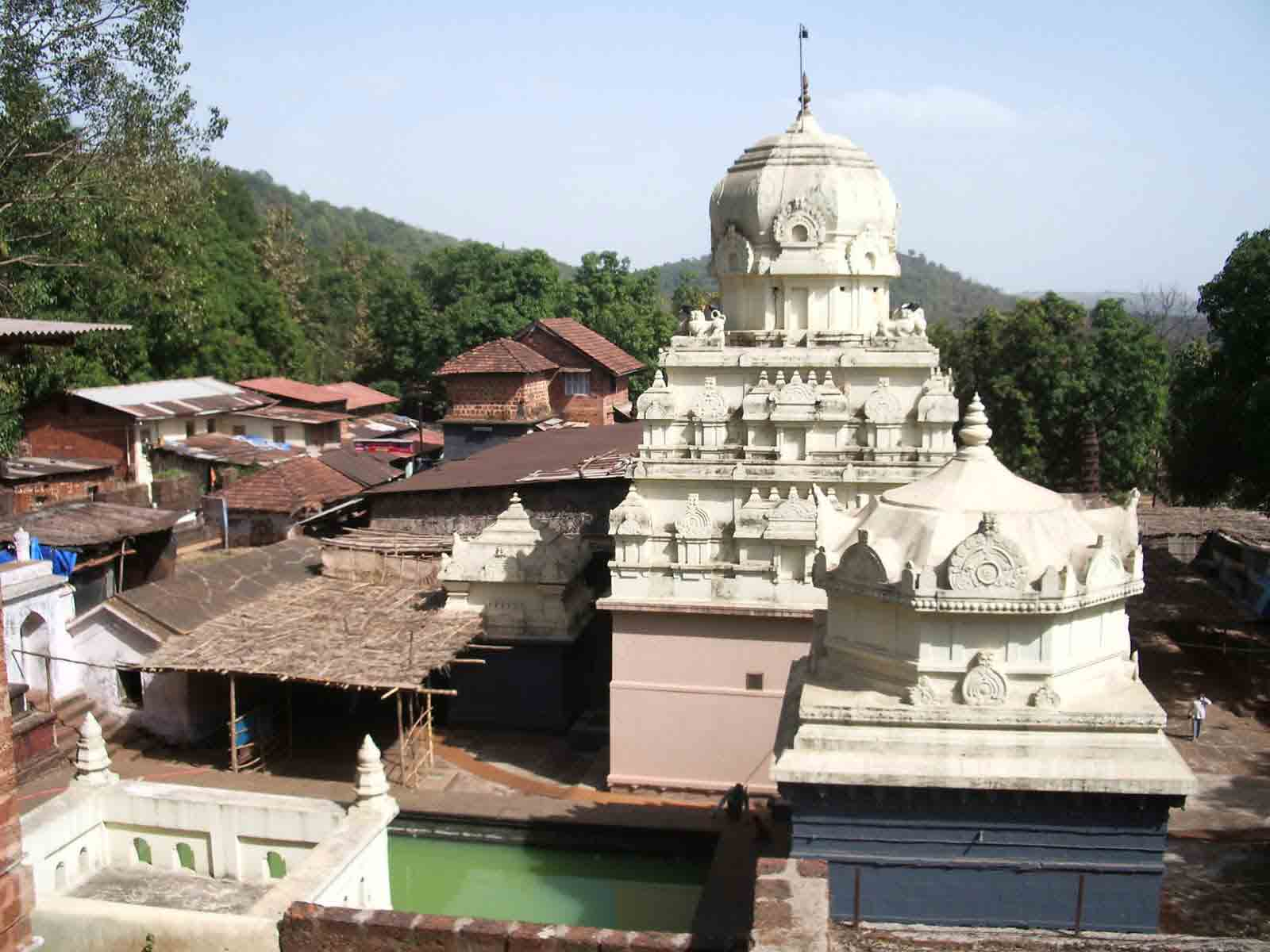

Religion
- Affiliation: Hinduism
- District: Ratnagiri district
- Deity: Parashurama

Location
- Location: Chiplun
- State: Maharashtra
- Country: India
- Interactive map of Parshuram Temple, Chiplun

Parshuram Temple (also known as Shree Kshetra Parshuram) is a temple of Lord Parshurama, the sixth avatar of Vishnu in Hinduism located near Chiplun in Ratnagiri district of Maharashtra, India.

== Lord Parshurama ==
Parshurama is a Chiranjivi (immortal) avatar. After he rid the earth of all the Kshatriyas twenty-one times, Parshurama donated the entire earth to Maharshi Kashyap, thus, he could not reside on that land. Parashuram had twenty-one battles to rid of those Kshatriyas Kings who had become brutal dictators and had given up the principles of dharma. The Last ruler to be killed was Kartavirya Arjuna. Rulers like Janak or Ikshwaku who ruled by principles, were not harmed. Parshurama shot an arrow in the Arabian Sea, pushed the sea back, and reclaimed the land of Konkan, today’s 720 km coastline of India stretching from Mumbai to Kerala. Parshurama chose the Mahendragiri peak (in the village also named Parshuram) from this land for his permanent residence. This is the place where the temple is located. It is believed that Lord Parshurama leaves for the Himalayas at sunrise, does tapa in the Himalayas and returns to the temple at sunset.

== Temple history ==
The temple was built by initiative from Swami Paramhans Brahmendra. He was the Guru of Siddi Yakutkhan of Janjira, Kanhoji Angre of Kolaba, Peshwa of Pune, Chatrapati Sahu Maharaj, Tararani of Kolhapur. He was also admired by the Portuguese and English for his presence in Peshwa and Angre's courts. Siddi Rasul Yakut Khan gave financial help to build Parshuram Temple in 1700. He gave Pedhe and Ambdas villages as Inam (prize) to Swamiji to incur daily expenses of the temple. Chatrapati Shahu Maharaj gave 5 nearby villages as Inam (prize). He built three temples, a Deepmahal (a tall stone structure used to light oil lamps as an offering to God) and a lodge for the pilgrims at Parshuram. Kanhoji Angre gave Mahalunge, Dorle, Kalambuse, Nayari, Virmade, Anewadi and Dhawdashi Inam (prize). In 1726 Siddhi demolished the temples by blaming Swamiji for giving away their elephant to Kanoji Angre, which was not true. The elephant, on its way from Savanur to Gowalkot was taken away by Angre's men to Jaigad. The Swami became angry and returned the elephant to Siddhi Saat. He later realized his mistake and rebuilt the demolished temples.

== Transport ==
The temple is located in Parshuram village in Chiplun Taluka of Maharashtra state in India.

=== Road ===
Parshuram is connected by road to Ratnagiri, Mumbai, Mangaluru, Madgaon, Karwar, Udupi by National Highway number 17 (NH-17), now renumbered as NH-66. Parshuram is connected with Koynanagar, Patan and Karad by State Highway number 78. It is 11 km from Chiplun towards Mumbai. Chiplun is 247 km from Mumbai. Chiplun-Pune distance is 230 km. The nearest State Transport bus stand (MSRTC) is in Chiplun. Chiplun is well-connected with the rest of Maharashtra via MSRTC buses.

=== Railways ===
The nearest railway station is Chiplun railway station on the Konkan Railway line. Chiplun is an important station on the route and nearly all trains halt at Chiplun. The railway station is 7 km from Parshuram village. Frequent trains are available to Mumbai, Goa and Mangalore. Chiplun is also well-connected via railway to Kerala, Mangalore and Delhi.

== Festivals ==
The major festivals celebrated at the temple are Akshaya Tritiya, Ram Navami and Mahashivratri.

== Management ==
The temple is managed by the Shree Dev Bhargavram Devasthan Trust.
