= Parasuramapura =

- Town
- Location in Karnataka, India Parasuramapura (India)
- Coordinates: 14.32°N 76.64°E
- Country: India
- State: Karnataka
- District: Chitradurga
- Talukas: Challakere

Government
  - Body: Grama Panchayath

Area
  - Total: 19 km^{2} (7.3 sq mi)
- Elevation: 550 m (1,800 ft)

Population (2011)
  - Total: 10,056
  - Density: 530/km^{2} (1,400/sq mi)

Languages
  - Official: Kannada
- Time zone: UTC+5:30 (IST)
- PIN: 577538
- Vehicle registration: KA-16

Parasuramapura is a Town in the southern state of Karnataka, India. It is located in the Challakere taluk of Chitradurga district in Karnataka, it is 60 km from Chitradurga, and geographically it is arid region. The River Vedavathi flows adjacent to village during rainy season and area records temperature of around 40-45 during peak summer and a minimal rainfall in rainy season, it borders with Ananthpur district of Andhra pradesh. One of the largest solar park in Asia being set up at pavagada, which is 50 km away. Nearest railway Station is at Challakere, 30 km away.

== Demographics ==
As of 2001 India census, Parasuramapura had a population of 9509 with 4854 males and 4655 females.

== See also ==
- Chitradurga
- Districts of Karnataka
