= Parshurampur, Parsa =

Parshurampur पर्शुरामपुर
- Village development committee
- Location in Nepal
- Coordinates: 27.04°N 84.73°E
- Country: Nepal
- Zone: Narayani Zone
- District: Parsa District

Population (1991)
  - Total: 1,898
- Time zone: UTC+5:45 (Nepal Time)

Parshurampur is a village in the Pokhariya municipality of the Parsa District in the Narayani Zone, southern Nepal. At the time of the 1991 Nepal census, it had a population of 1898 people living in 292 individual households.

Formerly, Parshurampur was a village development committee (VDC). In 2017, the local levels of Nepalese government administration were reformed to abolish VDCs, creating village councils or rural municipalities in their place. Parshurampur, in its entirety, was added to the neighbouring Pokhariya municipality.
