= Parashurama =

Sixth avatar of the Hindu god Vishnu

- Member of Dashavatara and Chiranjivi
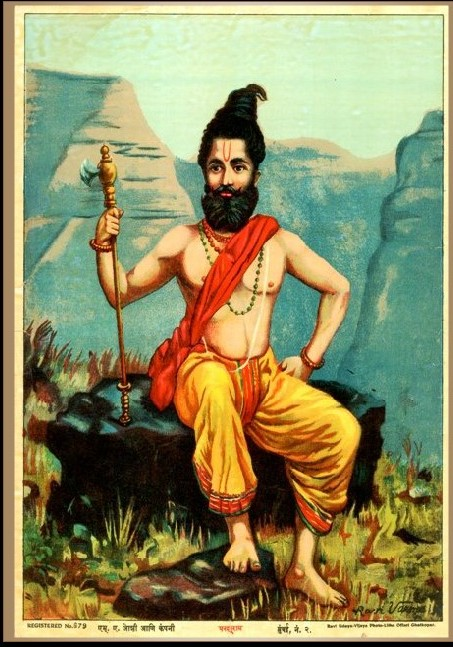
- Parashuram by Raja Ravi Varma
- Other names: Bhargava Rama; Rama Jamadagnya; Ramabhadra
- Devanagari: परशुराम
- Sanskrit transliteration: Paraśurāma
- Venerated in: Vaishnavism
- Abode: Mahendra Mountains
- Weapon: Parashu
- Day: Thursday

Genealogy
- Born: Akshaya Tritiya; Parashurampuri Shahjahanpur
- Parents: Jamadagni (father); Renuka (mother)
- Siblings: Rumaṇvān, Suhotra, Vasu, and Viśvāvasu
- Spouse: Dharani

Dashavatara Sequence
- Predecessor: Vamana
- Successor: Rama

Parashurama (Sanskrit: परशुराम, romanized: Paraśurāma, lit. 'Rama with an axe'), also referred to as Rama Jamadagnya, Bhargava Rama, and Virarama, is the sixth avatar among the Dashavatara of the preserver god Vishnu in Hinduism. He is described as one of the Chiranjivi (Immortals), who will appear at the end of the Kali Yuga to be the guru of Vishnu's tenth and last incarnation, Kalki.

Born to Jamadagni and Renuka, Parashuram was foretold to appear at a time when overwhelming evil prevailed on the earth. When Kshatriyas begun to abuse their power, he corrected the cosmic equilibrium by destroying most of them. He is married to Dharani, an incarnation of Lakshmi, the wife of Vishnu.

In the epic Ramayana, he challenges Rama to combat during the latter's homeward journey to Ayodhya, following his wedding to Sita. He later acknowledges Rama as an avatar of Vishnu, and retires to his abode to perform yoga.

In the epic Mahabharata he was the guru of Bhisma, Drona, Rukmi, and Karna.

== Legend ==
According to Hindu mythology, Parashurama was born to the sage Jamadagni and his Kshatriya wife, Renuka. In local tradition, it is believed they lived in a hut located at Janapav. They had a celestial cow called Surabhi, which gave them all that they desired. A king named Sahasrabahu/Kartavirya Arjuna (not to be confused with Arjuna, the Pandava) (Note: The Mahabharata includes legends about both Arjuna, one is dharmic (moral) and other adharmic (immoral); in some versions, Arjuna Kartavirya has mixed moral-immoral characteristics consistent with the Hindu belief that there is varying degrees of good and evil in every person.) learns about this cow of plenty and wants it. He asks Jamadagni to give it to him, but the sage refuses. While Parashurama is away from the hut, the king takes it by force. When Jamadagni pleads his case and seeks for the return of the cow, the king strikes him with his fist, killing him. Parashurama learns about this crime, and is enraged. With his axe in his hand, he challenges the king to battle. They fight, and Parashurama defeats and kills the king, according to the Padma Purana.

The wicked-minded one lost his valour due to his own sin. The mighty son of Reṇukā, being angry, cut off his head, as mighty Indra did the peak of a big mountain, and he who was brave and angry, killed Sahasrabāhu and all the kings with his axe in the battle. Seeing Rāma, the very fearful one, all kings on the earth, struck by fear, ran away as elephants do on seeing a lion. The angry Rāma killed the kings even though they had fled due to the resentment against his father's murder, as the angry Garuḍa killed the serpents. The valorous Rāma made the entire [world] clear of the kṣatriyas, but protected [i.e. spared] only the very great family of Ikṣvāku, due to its being the family to which his maternal grandfather was related, and due to his mother's words.

— Padma Purana, Chapter 241

The warrior class challenges him, and he slays every single member of the class, save for those belonging to the lineages of Manu and Ikshvaku. The mighty son of Jamadagni, having rid the world of the Kshatriyas, then performs the ashvamedha sacrifice. He grants the earth with the seven islands to principal rishis belonging to the Brahmin class. Having renounced the earth and his violent deeds, he retires to the hermitage of Nara-Narayana to engage in penance. The legend likely has roots in the ancient conflict between the Brahmin varna, with knowledge duties, and the Kshatriya varna, with warrior and enforcement roles.

=== Epic Ramayana ===
In the Ramayana, following Rama's wedding to Sita at Mithila and during their homeward journey to Ayodhya, his party comes across a number of inauspicious signs. Amid an earthquake and a dust storm, Parashurama appears before the party. After accepting the libation offered to him, Parashurama challenges Rama to combat, on the condition that the prince show his strength to the sage by placing a bow within the string of the latter's bow, Sharanga, and discharging it. Ignoring Dasharatha's plea to spare Rama this task, Parashurama relays the divine origin of the bow and the history of its ownership, appealing to Rama's skills as a warrior. Rama seizes the bow from Parashurama and strings it, an act that causes the latter to become bereft of his divine power. Humbled, Parashurama acknowledges that Rama is an incarnation of Vishnu and requests the prince to allow him to return to the mountain Mahendra so that he could practice yoga and accrue merit. After circumambulating Rama in worship, Parashurama returns to his hermitage.

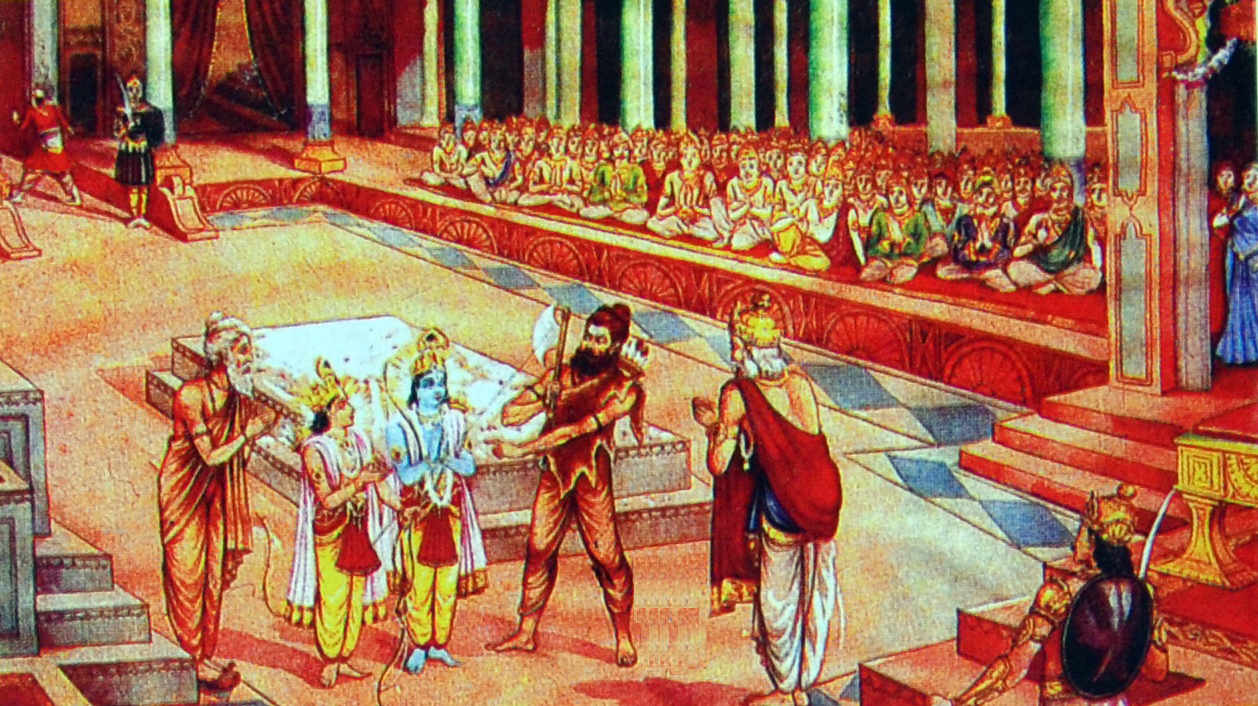
Painting in Sri Bhargavaraghaviyam. Painting depicting the court of King Janaka.

=== Epic Mahabharata ===
==== Bhishma ====
In the Mahabharata, Parashurama intercedes on the princess Amba's behalf, promising to command his disciple Bhishma to do his duty and marry her after her abduction. When Parashurama arrives with his retinue at Kurukshetra, he sends a message to Bhishma to inform him of his arrival. Bhishma comes to see his guru, offering him the traditional respects. Parashurama commands Bhishma to accept Amba as his wife. Bhishma refuses, restating that he had taken a vow of celibacy. An infuriated Parashurama threatens Bhishma with death. Bhishma tries to calm the sage, but in vain, and he finally agrees to battle his guru to safeguard his Kshatriya duty. Ganga tries stopping the battle by beseeching her son as well as the great sage, but fails. The great battle lasts for 23 days, without any result. On the 24th day, when Bhishma chooses to use a deadly weapon, at the requests of the divine sage Narada and the devas, Parashurama ends the conflict and the battle is declared a draw. Parashurama narrates the events to Amba and urges her to seek Bhishma's protection. However, Amba refuses to listen to Parashurama's advice and angrily declares that she would achieve her objective by asceticism.

=== Parshuram Kshetra ===
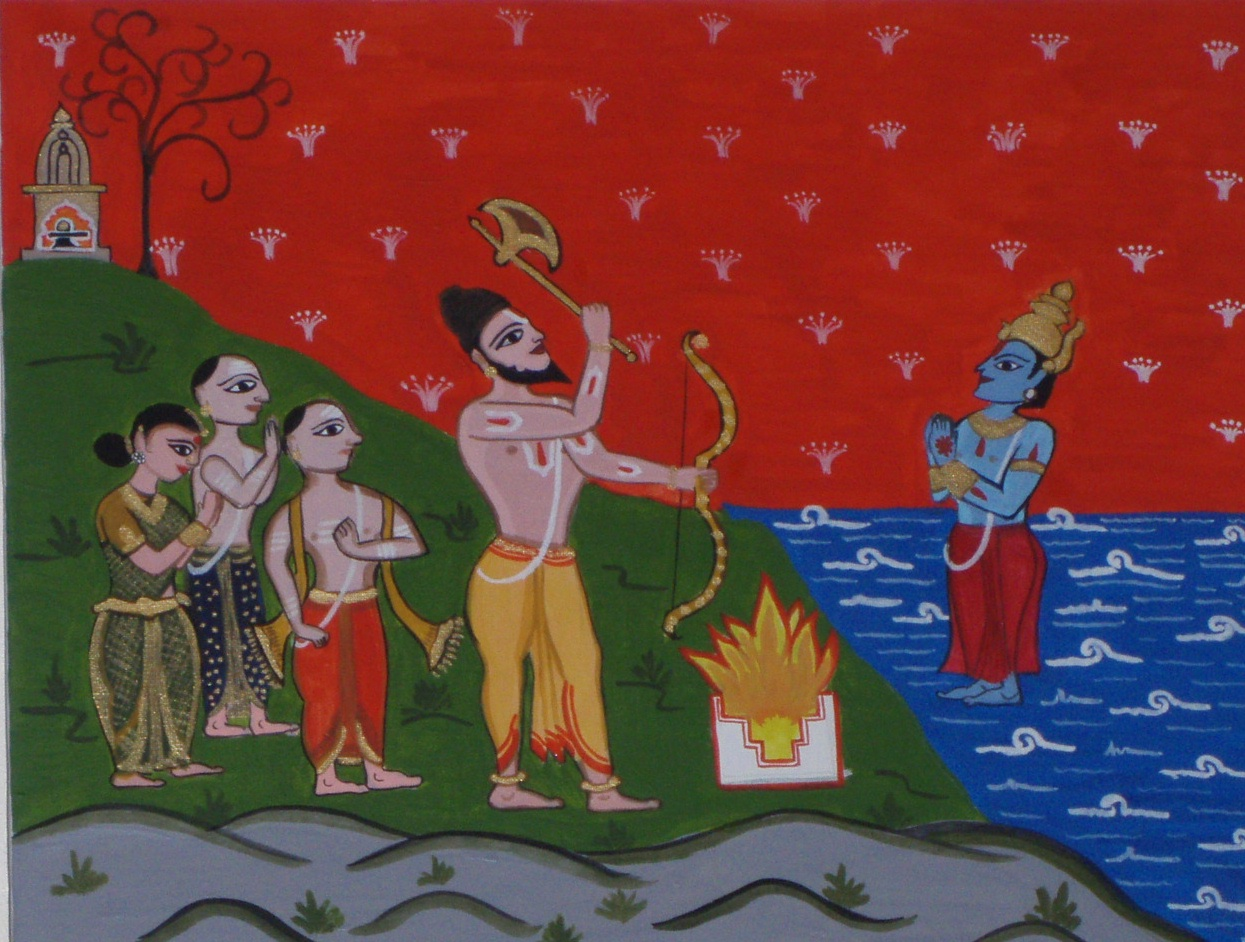
Parashurama, surrounded by settlers, commanding Varuna, god of the waters to recede to make land known as 'Parashurama Kshetra' from Gokarna to Kanyakumari for the Brahmins

There are legends dealing with the origins of the western coast geographically and culturally. One such legend is the retrieval of the west coast from the sea, by Parashurama. It proclaims that Parashurama, an incarnation of Mahavishnu, threw his battle axe into the sea. As a result, the land of the western coast arose, and thus was reclaimed from the waters. The place from which he threw his axe (or shot an arrow) is on Salher fort (the second highest peak and the highest fort in Maharashtra) in the Baglan taluka of Nashik district of Maharashtra. There is a temple on the summit of this fort dedicated to Parshuram and there are footprints in the rock four times the size of normal humans. This fort on a lower plateau has a temple of goddess Renuka, Parshuram's mother and also a Yagya Kunda with pits for poles to erect a shamiyana on the banks of a big water tank.

According to the Sangam classic Purananuru, the Chera king Senkuttuvan conquered the lands between Kanyakumari and the Himalayas. Lacking worthy enemies, he besieged the sea by throwing his spear into it. According to the 17th-century Malayalam work Keralolpathi, the lands of Kerala were recovered from the sea by the axe-wielding warrior sage Parashurama, the sixth incarnation of Vishnu (hence, Kerala is also called Parashurama Kshetram 'The Land of Parashurama'). Parashurama threw his axe across the sea, and the water receded as far as it reached. According to legend, this new area of land extended from Gokarna to Kanyakumari. The land which rose from sea was filled with salt and unsuitable for habitation; so Parashurama invoked the snake king Vasuki, who spat holy poison and converted the soil into fertile lush green land. Out of respect, Vasuki and all snakes were appointed as protectors and guardians of the land. P. T. Srinivasa Iyengar has theorised that Senguttuvan may have been inspired by the Parashurama legend, which was brought by early Aryan settlers.

In present-day Goa (or Gomantak), which is a part of the Konkan, there is a temple in Canacona in South Goa district dedicated to Parashurama.

== Shastras ==
Parashurama is generally presented as the fifth son of Renuka and Rishi Jamadagni. The legends of Parashurama appear in many Hindu texts, in different versions:

=== Devi Bhagvata Purana ===
In Chapter 6 of the Devi Bhagavata Purana, he is born from the thigh with intense light surrounding him that blinds all warriors, who then repent their evil ways and promise to lead a moral life if their eyesight is restored. The boy grants them the boon. Parashurama retired in the Mahendra Mountains, according to chapter 2.3.47 of the Bhagavata Purana.

=== Vishnu Purana ===
In Chapter 4 of the Vishnu Purana, Rcika prepares a meal for two women, one simple, and another with ingredients that if eaten would cause the woman to conceive a son with martial powers. The latter is accidentally eaten by Renuka, and she then gives birth to Parashurama.

=== Vayu Purana ===
In Chapter 2 of the Vayu Purana, he is born after his mother Renuka eats a sacrificial offering made to both Rudra (Shiva) and Vishnu, which gives him dual characteristics of Kshatriya and Brahmin.

=== Mahabharata ===
Parashurama is described in some versions of the Mahabharata as the angry Brahmin who with his axe, killed a huge number of Kshatriya warriors because they were abusing their power. In some versions, he even kills his own mother because his father asks him to in order to test his obeisance. After Parashurama obeys his father's order to kill his mother, his father grants him a boon. Parashurama asks for the reward that his mother be brought back to life, and she is restored to life. Parashurama remains filled with sorrow after the violence, repents and expiates his sin. After his Mother comes back to life, he tries to clean the blood-stained axe but he finds a drop of blood which he was unable to clean and tries cleaning the blood drop in different rivers. This is when he moves towards the south of India in search of any holy river where he could clean his axe, finally, he reaches Tirthahalli village in Shimoga, Karnataka and tries to clean the axe and to his surprise, the axe gets cleaned in the holy river of Tunga. With respect towards the holy river, he constructs a Shiva linga and performs pooja and the temple is named as Rameshwara temple. The place where Parashurama cleaned his axe is called Ramakunda.

He plays important roles in the Mahabharata serving as mentor to Bhishma (chapter 5.178), Drona (chapter 1.121) and Karna (chapter 3.286), teaching weapon arts and helping key warriors in both sides of the war. (Note: The Sanskrit epic uses multiple names for Parashurama in its verses: Parashurama, Jamadagnya, Rama (his name shortened, but not to be confused with Rama of Ramayana), etc.)

In the regional literature of Kerala, he is the founder of the land, the one who brought it out of the sea and settled a Hindu community there. He is also known as Rama Jamadagnya and Rama Bhargava in some Hindu texts. He is the only incarnation of Vishnu who never dies, never returns to abstract Vishnu and lives in meditative retirement. Further, he is the only incarnation of Vishnu that co-exists with other Vishnu incarnations Rama and Krishna in some versions of the Ramayana and Mahabharata, respectively. (Note: These texts also state that Parasurama lost the essence of Vishnu while he was alive, and Vishnu then appeared as a complete avatar in Rama; later, in Krishna.)

=== Samanta Panchaka ===
According to the Sangraha Parva, after killing 21 generations of Kshatriyas, he filled their blood in five pools collectively known as the Samantha Panchaka (Sanskrit: समंत पञ्चक). He later atoned for his sin by severe penance. The five pools are considered to be holy.

The Anukramanika Parva says that the Samantha Panchaka is located somewhere around Kurukshetra. It also mentions that the Pandavas performed a few religious rites near the Samantha Panchaka before the Kurukshetra War.

== Parashurama Kshetra ==
Legend tells that before retiring to Mahendragiri mount, Parashurama threw his axe in the Arabian Sea, and land rose out of it, called Parashurama Kshetra. There is much interpretation of 'Parashurama Kshetra' (Land of Parashurama) mentioned in the Puranas.

The region on the western coast of India from Gokarna to Kanyakumari was known as Parashurama Kshetra.

The region of Konkan was also considered as Parashurama Kshetra.

The ancient Saptakonkana is a slightly larger region described in the Sahyadrikhanda which refers to it as Parashuramakshetra (Sanskrit for "The Land Of Parashurama"), Vapi to Tapi is an area of South Gujarat, India. This area is called "Parshuram Ni Bhoomi".

== Iconography ==
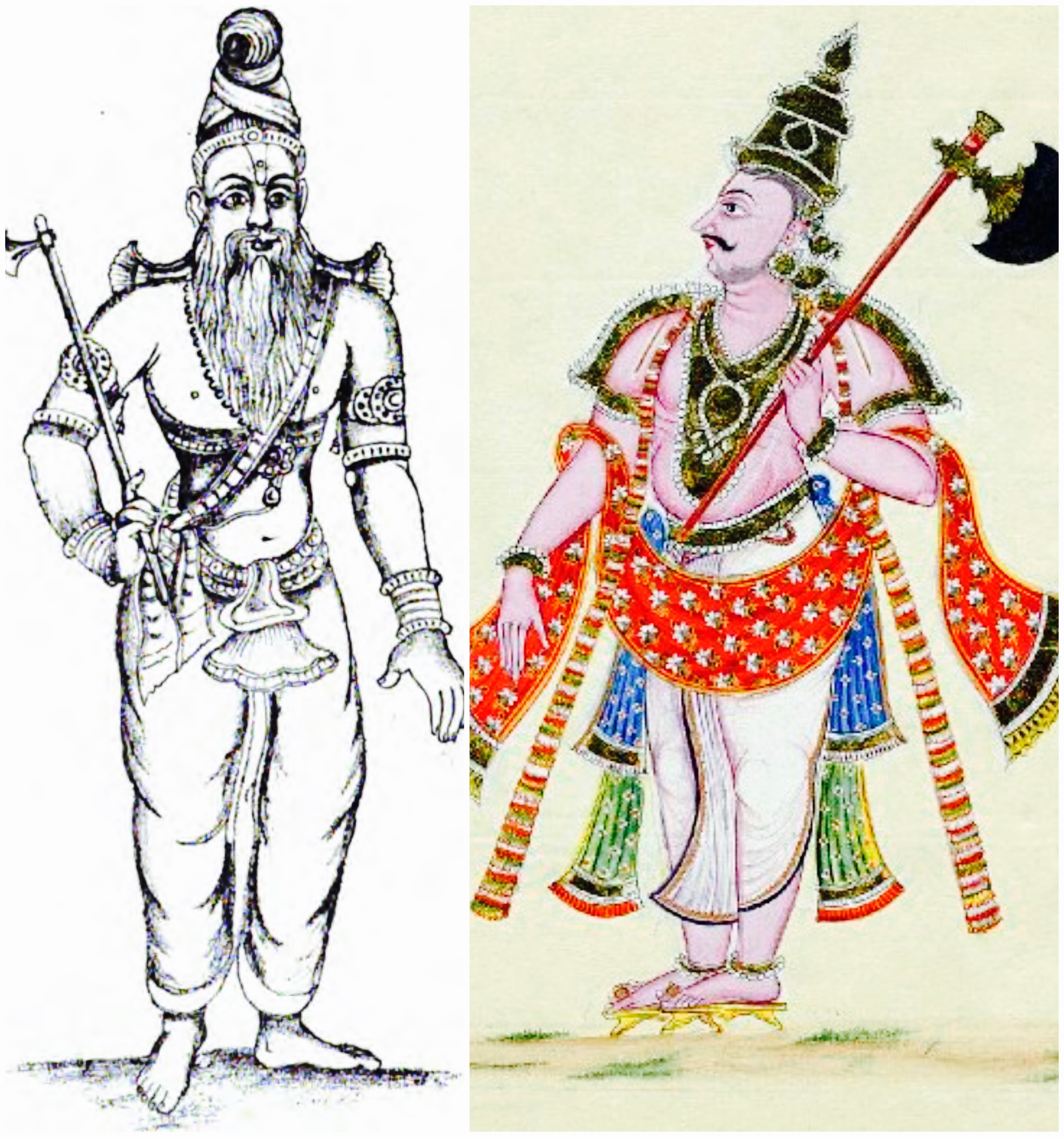
Parashurama with his axe (two representations)

The Hindu literature on iconography such as the Vishnudharmottara Purana and Rupamandana describes him as a man with matted locks, with two hands, one carrying an axe. However, the Agni Purana portrays his iconography with four hands, carrying his axe, bow, arrow and sword. The Bhagavata Purana describes his icon as one with four hands, carrying his axe, bow, arrows and a shield like a warrior. Though a warrior, his representation inside Hindu temples with him in war scenes is rare (the Basohli temple is one such exception). Typically, he is shown with two hands, with an axe in his right hand either seated or standing.

== List of Temples ==
Name	Primary Deity	Location	State	Image	Speciality
Anantheshwara Temple	Parashurama	Udupi	Karnataka		Parashurama is worshipped in the form of a Lingam.
Sree Parasurama Temple	Parashurama	Thiruvallam, Thiruvananthapuram	Kerala		
Attirala Sri Parasurama Swamy Temple	Parashurama	Attirala, Rajempet	Andhra Pradesh		
Parshuram Kund	Parshuram	Lohit District	Arunachal Pradesh		Pilgrims visit during Winter Season every year, especially on the day of Makar Sankranti for a holy dip which is believed to wash away one's sins.
Banganga Parshuram Mandir	Parashuram	Mumbai, Walkeshwar	Maharashtra		Ramayan shrine
Mahurgad	Renuka, Parashuram	Nanded District	Maharashtra		Shakti Pitha shrine
Parashuram Mandir	Parashuram	Chiplun, Ratnagiri District	Maharashtra		
Parshuram Mandir	Parashuram	Mokama	Bihar		Kalash Yatra
Parshuram Mandir, Gunj	Parshuram	Gunj	Maharashtra		
Janapav kuti	Parshuram	Janapav	Madhya Pradesh		Parshuram Birthplace
Baba Tanginath Dham	Lord Shiva	Gumla	Jharkhand		Prashuram did penance for Shiva
Parshuram Mahadev Temple	Lord Shiva	Pali District	Rajasthan		Parshuram received the boon of immortality & numerous divine weapons along with his axe from Lord Shiva here.
Renuka Ji Parshuram Temple	Renuka & Parshuram	Sirmaur district	Himachal Pradesh		Parshuram is worshiped along with his mother Renuka.

== Gallery ==
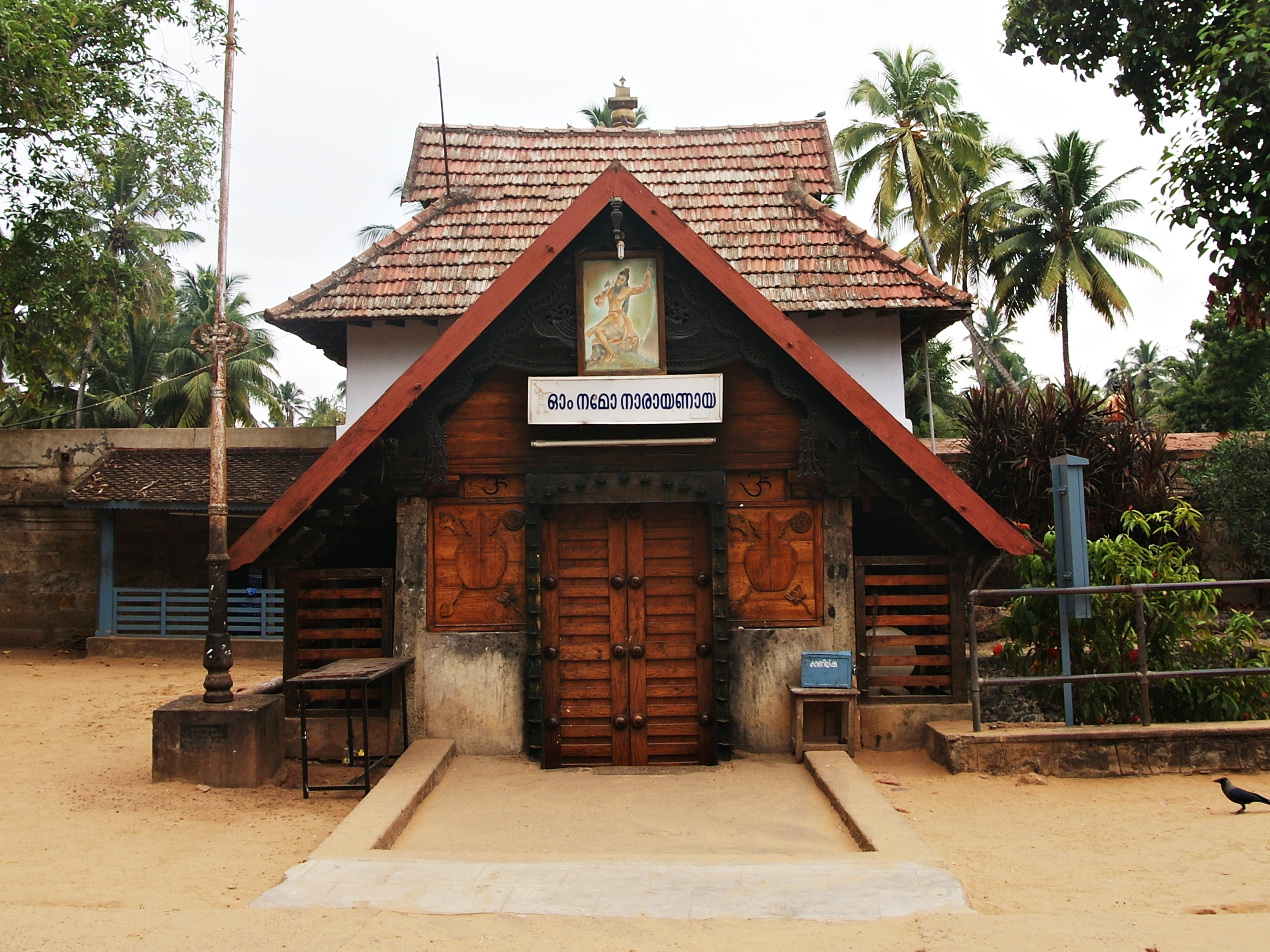
A Parashurama temple in Kerala

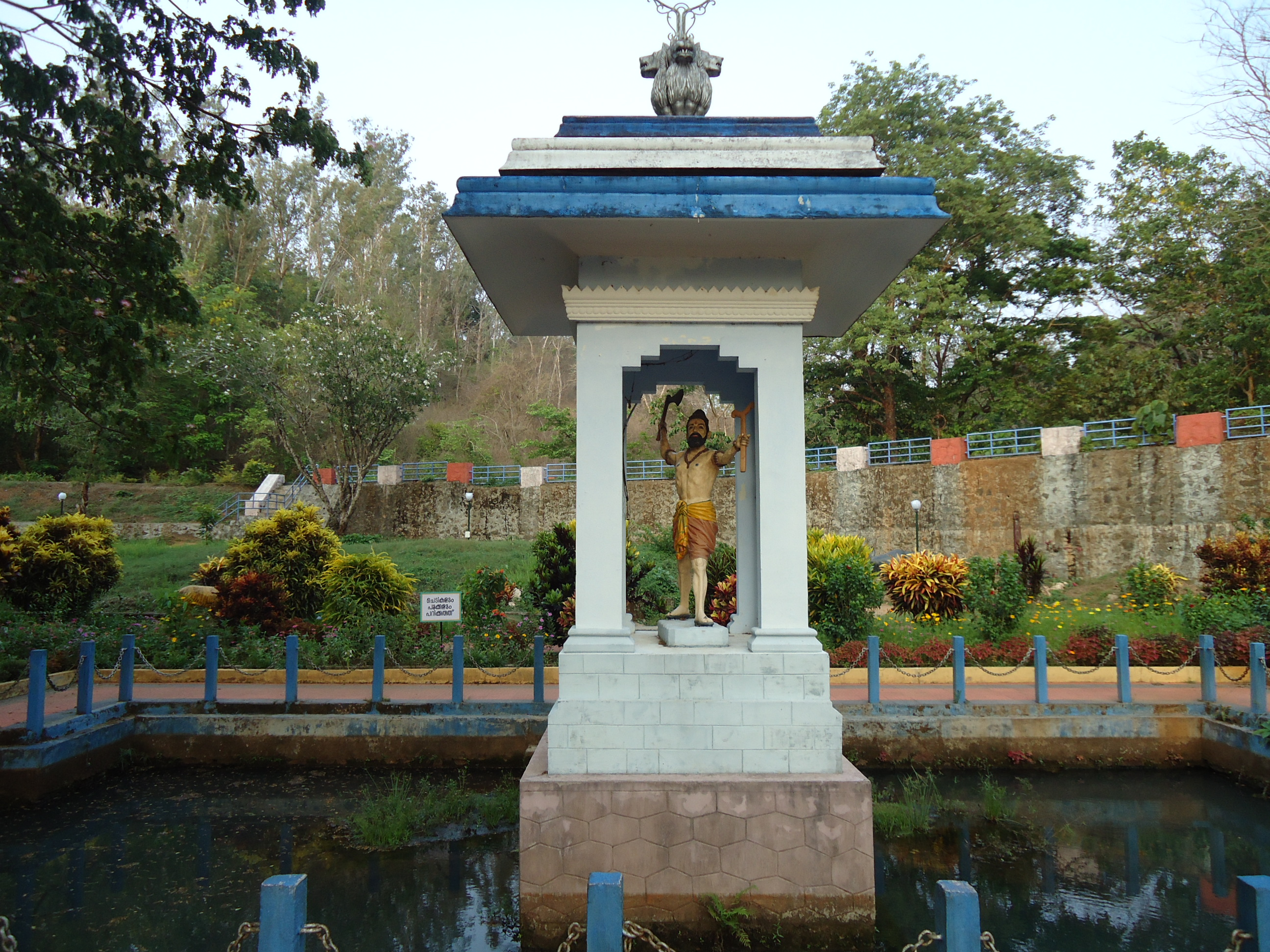
Parashurama in a garden

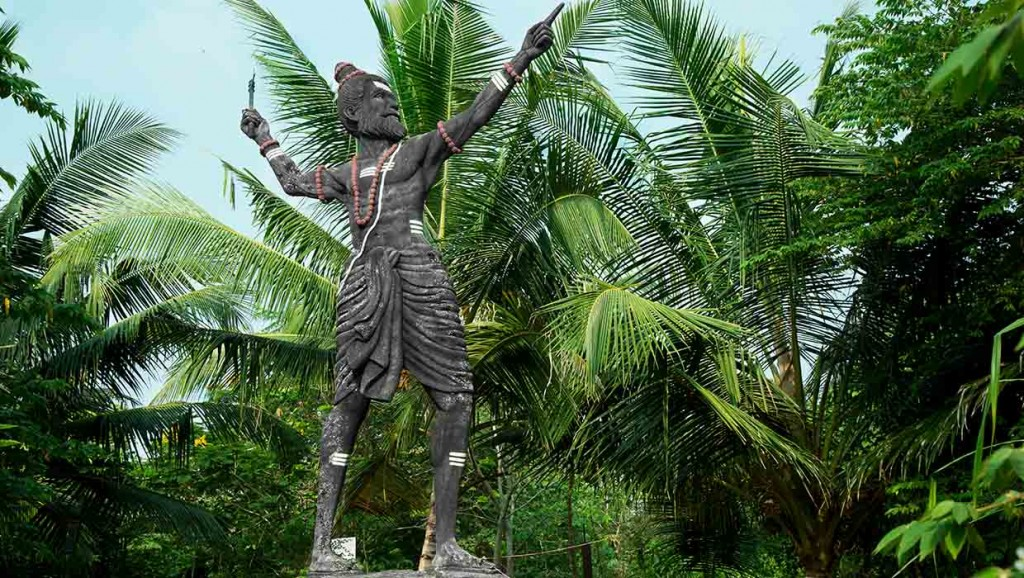
Statue @ Mango Meadows, Kaduthuruthy

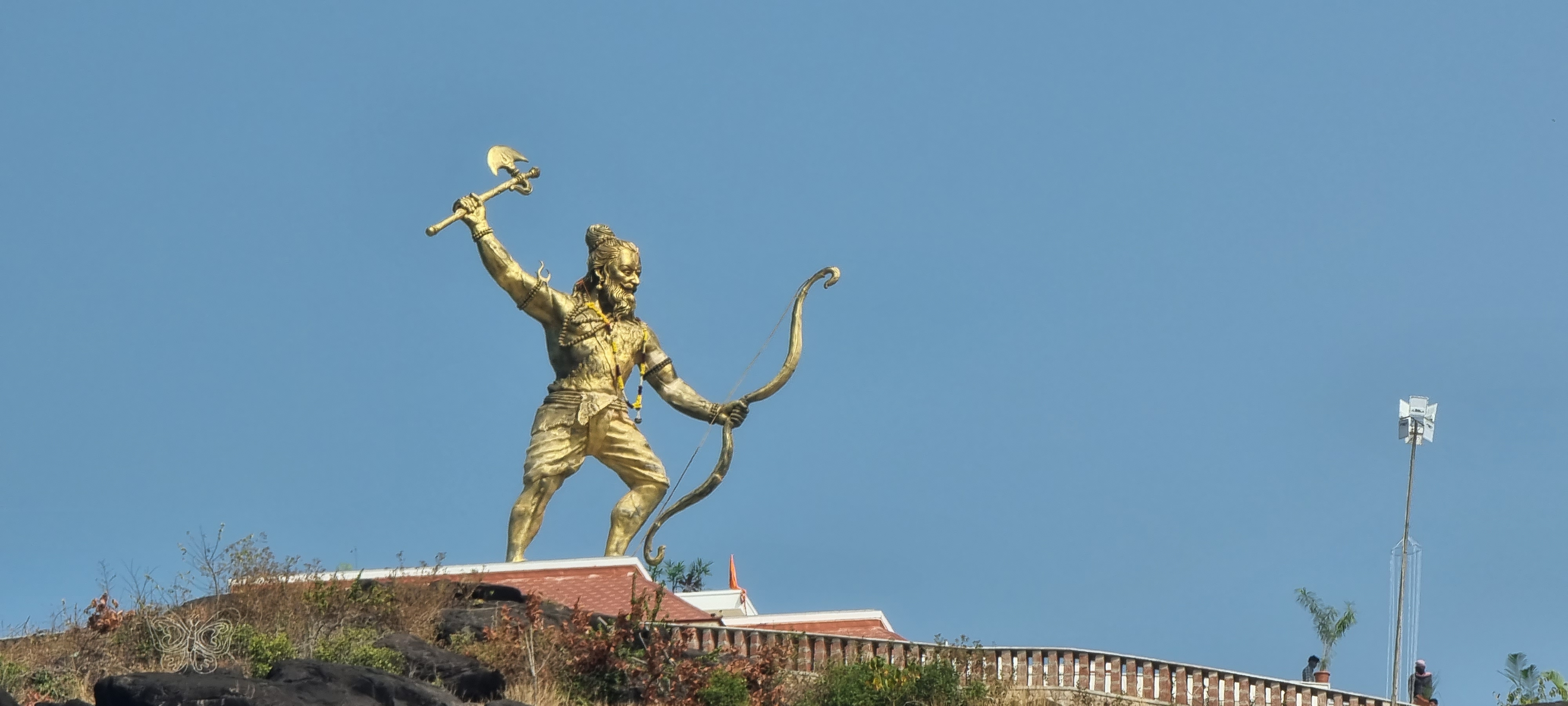
Statute @ Bailur, Udupi

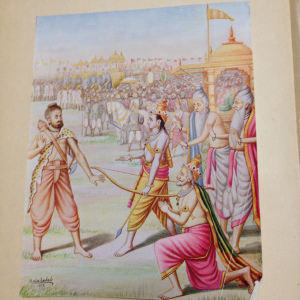
Rama and Parashurama with Dasharatha

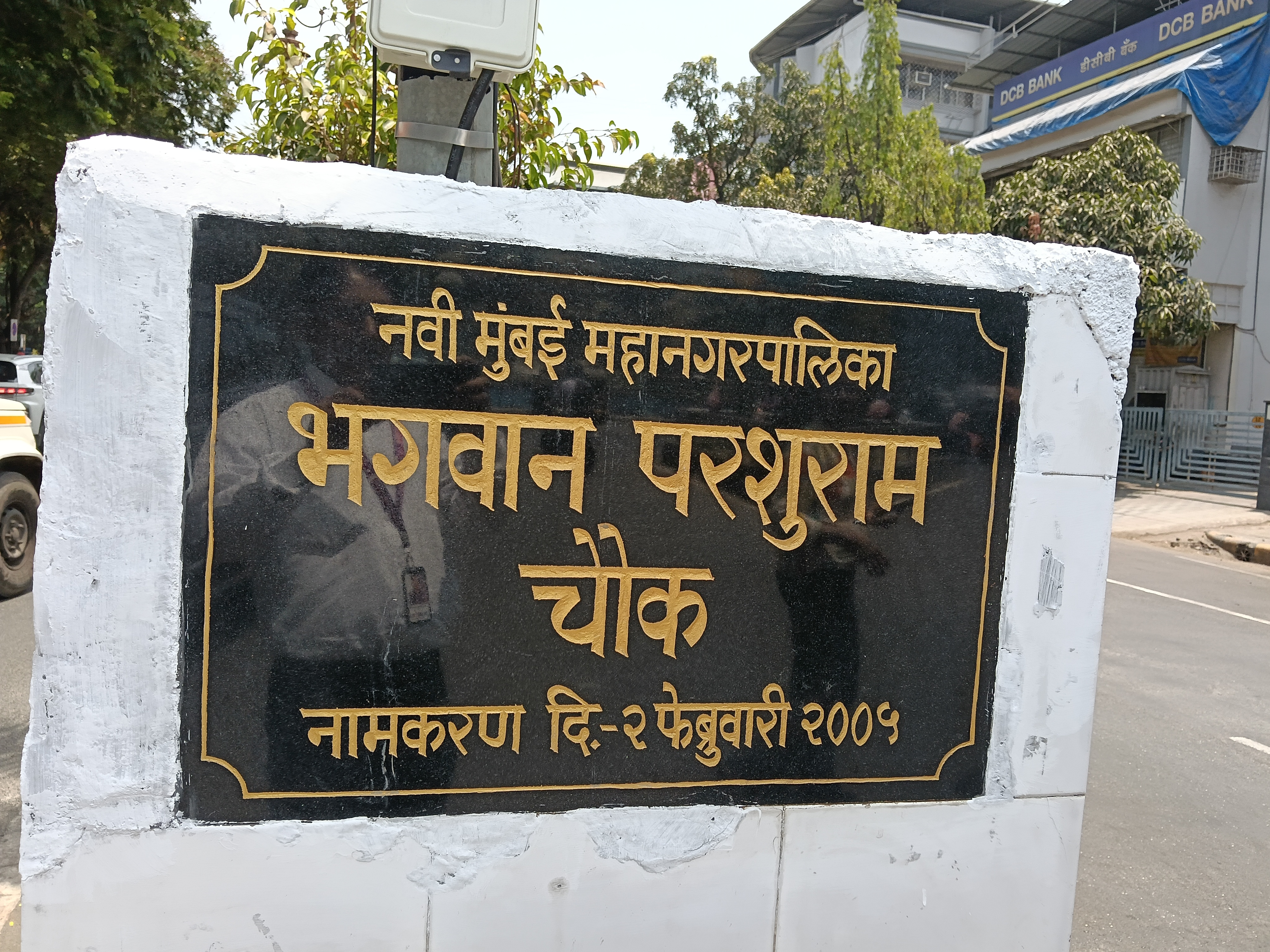
Legacy of the name of Lord Parshuram, a chowk at Vashi Sector 17 in Navi Mumbai.

== In popular culture ==
The Parashurama avatar symbolizes the strict and non-relinquishing aspect of showing daya (mercy), where he has to be harsh for the well being of the srushti (world).

On top of the hills of Janapav is a Shiva temple where Parashurama is believed to have worshipped Shiva, the ashram is known as Jamadagni Ashram, named after his father. The place also has a Kund (Pond) that is being developed by the state government.

The Bhumihar caste of eastern Uttar Pradesh and Bihar claim to be descendants of Parashuram. As Parashurama was a Brahmin who carried out warfare like a Kshatriya, Bhumihars thus claim the traits of both the varnas.

In Kannada folklore, especially in devotional songs sung by the Devdasis he is often referred to as a son of Yellamma. Parashurama legends are notable for their discussion of violence, the cycles of retaliations, the impulse of krodha (anger), the inappropriateness of krodha, and repentance.

In the Mithila region of Bihar, there is a legendary place known as Panth Pakar believed to be the location where the first dialogue between Lord Parshuram and Lord Rama in the epic Ramayana took place. It is located in the Sitamarhi district of Bihar.

== See also ==
- Bhagwan Parshuram (movie)
- Chiranjivi
- Heheya Kingdom
- Kalachuri Kingdom
- Parasuram Express
- Śānkarasmṛti (Laghudharmaprakrāśikā)
- Vijaya (bow)

== Notes ==
Regnal titles
Preceded by Vamana	Dashavatara; Treta Yuga	Succeeded by Rama
