= List of songs recorded by Anuradha Paudwal =

This is the list of songs performed by Anuradha Paudwal from 1973 til date. Of the 1501 songs that have been performed by Paudwal, 785 are listed here. She has also sung in several other languages.

== Bengali songs ==
Year	Film	Song	Composer(s)	Co-artist(s)	
1986	Abhiman	"Pujar Thalay"	Ajoy Das	sol	
1987	Mouno Mukhor	"Shilong Er Pine Bone"	Abhijeet Banerjee	Kishore Kumar	
1987	Mouno Mukhor	"Thomki Thomki Chole"	Abhijeet Banerjee	Bhupinder Singh	
1988	Aalingan	"Jai Mahadevi Namo"		solo	
1988	Bondini	"Eto Bhalobasha Diyecho"	N/A	solo	
1988	Bondini	"Maa Lokkhi O Maa"	N/A	solo	
1989	Amar Shapath	"Esechi Aaj Raate"	N/A	solo	
1989	Amar Shapath	"Ei Dinta Ashuk Phire"	N/A	Suresh Wadkar	
1989	Bandini	"Eto Bhalobasha Diyecho"	Kanu Bhattacharya	Mohammad Aziz	
1989	Bandini	"Maa Lokkhi"	Kanu Bhattacharya	solo	
1989	Buddhuram	"Hridoye Nibhrite Tumi"	N/A	solo	
1989	Dolon Chapa	"Gurujone Pronam Kori"		solo	
1989	Jhankaar	"Ei Elakay Baas Korina"	R D Burman	Amit Kumar	
1989	Mone Mone	"Kandte Partam Jodi"	Kanu Bhattacharya	solo	
1990	Aashiqui (Dubbed version)	"Tomari Bhabnay Aasheyna Ghum"	Nadeem–Shravan	Kumar Sanu	
1990	Aashiqui (Dubbed version)	"Ei Duniya Pari Bhoolte"	Nadeem–Shravan	Kumar Sanu	
1990	Aashiqui (Dubbed version)	"Jaane Jibon Jaane Mon"	Nadeem–Shravan	Kumar Sanu	
1990	Aashiqui (Dubbed version)	"Lukochuri Te Ei Prem"	Nadeem–Shravan	Kumar Sanu	
1990	Aashiqui (Dubbed version)	"Ei Chokhe Shopno Tumi"	Nadeem–Shravan	Kumar Sanu	
1990	Aashiqui (Dubbed version)	"Duti Mon Mile Jokhon Bosonto Hoy"	Nadeem–Shravan	Udit Narayan	
1990	Abhimanyu	"Dik Nei Disha Nei"	Mrinal Banerjee	solo	
1990	Agnidaha	"Katena Din Katena Raat"	Bappi Lahiri	solo	
1990	Agnidaha	"O Mon Churi Korona"	Bappi Lahiri	Mohammad Aziz	
1990	Chetona	"Eshona Shono Na"		solo	
1990	Dil (Dubbed)	"Samne Jar Dekha Pai"	Anand–Milind	Udit Narayan	
1990	Dil (Dubbed)	"Ei Prem Je Swargo Sudha"	Anand–Milind	Udit Narayan	
1990	Dil (Dubbed)	"Ami Prem Ki Janina"	Anand–Milind	N/A	
1990	Dil (Dubbed)	"O Priya Priya"	Anand–Milind	N/A	
1990	Haraner Natjamai	"Aar Kotokal Bolo"	Salil Chowdhury	solo	
1990	Haraner Natjamai	"Ei Sundarbaner Kahini"	Salil Chowdhury	solo	
1990	Jiban Sangi	"Jibon Kahini Bhalobasha"	Mrinal Banerjee	solo	
1990	Jiban Sangi	"Tumi Amay Korte Sukhi Jibone"	Mrinal Banerjee	Amit Kumar	
1990	Nyay Danda	"Kandte Je Parina"	N/A	solo	
1990	Nyay Danda	"Baje Runjhun"	N/A	solo	
1990	Paapi	"Maa Bole Amay Keno"	Bappi Lahiri	Amit Kumar	
1990	Pitrireen	"Sondha Ghonak Khoti Nei" (female)		solo	
1990	Pitrireen	"Dheu Shudhu"		solo	
1990	Prem Songee	"Elaam He Mayer Kole"		solo	
1990	Prem Songee	"Mon Jodi Seibhabe"		Toton Kumar	
1990	Shubho Kamona	"Ei Je Tithi"	Ajoy Das	Kumar Sanu	
1991	Anondo	"Ogo Saathi Ogo Priyo"	Y S Mulky	solo	
1991	Bidhilipi	"Akash Milechhe Dekho"	Swapan Chakraborty	Amit Kumar	
1991	Bidhilipi	"Etodin Duti Nodi"	Swapan Chakraborty	Amit Kumar	
1991	Bourani	"Babuder Kheyal"	R D Burman	solo	
1991	Dil Hai Ki Maanta Nahin (dubbed)	"Kono Ekjoner Tumi Preyoshi"	Nadeem-Shravan	Abhijeet Bhattacharya	
1991	Krodhi	"Moyna Nodir Dhare"	R D Burman	Kumar Sanu	
1991	Krodhi	"Parini Bolite Ami"	R D Burman	Kumar Sanu	
1991	Krodhi	"Shopno Sotti Holo Je"	R D Burman	Kumar Sanu	
1991	Krodhi	"Asbe Amar Gaane"	R D Burman	solo	
1991	Krodhi	"Koto Sundor Ei Jibon"	R D Burman	solo	
1991	Lakshmi Durga Saraswati	"Ogo Aalo"		solo	
1991	Mohashoy	"Dekhe Monehoy Achhe"	Sapan-Jagmohan	Shammi Kapoor	
1991	Prem Joyare	"Akasher Moyo Seemahin"	Rajesh Roshan	Nitin Mukesh	
1991	Prem Joyare	"GolibTheke Rajpoth"	Rajesh Roshan	Amit Kumar	
1991	Prem Joyare	"Megh Megh Megh Mon"	Rajesh Roshan	solo	
1991	Sadharon Meye	"Jaani Purush Tumi"	Kanu Bhattacharya	solo	
1991	Thikana	"Tomake Ami Boli"	N/A	solo	
1991	Thikana	"Tumi Hou Shudhu Ami"	N/A	solo	
1991	Thikana	"Andhakar Ee Shesh Kotha Noy"	N/A	solo	
1991	Thikana	"Bone Rong Mone Rong"	N/A	Kumar Sanu	
1992	Amriter Putra	"Aaj Tomake Peyechi"	N/A	Udit Narayan	
1992	Amriter Putra	"Shono Shono Shono"	N/A	Ajoy Das	
1992	Amriter Putra	"Ei Nil Nirjone"	N/A	solo	
1992	Anutap	"Iman Bolo Basant Bolo"	Bappi Lahiri	Bappi Lahiri	
1992	Apon Por	"Amra Notun Juti"	Bappi Lahiri	Kumar Sanu	
1992	Lal Pahadi	"Chokh Bondho Na"		Gautam Mitra	
1992	Lal Pahadi	"Majhe Majhe Hariye Jete"		solo	
1992	Mayabini	"O Doyal Tomar"	Tanmoy Chatterjee	solo	
1992	Mayabini	"Kuchboron Konna"	Tanmoy Chatterjee	Mohammad Aziz	
1992	Premer Protidan	"Jodi Konodin Dekhi Tumi Nei"	Sheikh Sadi Khan	Kumar Sanu	
1992	Rakte Lekha	"Ganga Cheyechilam"	Bappi Lahiri	solo	
1993	Aamar Saathi	"Toofan Mail"		solo	
1993	Ishwar Parameshwar	"Kothay Shankar Kothay Koli"		Asha Bhosle, Kumar Sanu, Suresh Wadkar	
1993	Moshal	"O Pakhi Re"	Ajoy Das	solo	
1993	Natun Sansar	"Thikana Haraye Amra Dujon"	Sameer Mukherjee	Amit Kumar	
1993	Natun Sansar	"Akashe Akashe Oi"	Sameer Mukherjee	Amit Kumar	
1993	Natun Sansar	"Amar Jonmodine Peyechi"	Sameer Mukherjee	solo	
1993	Premer Protidan	"Jodi Konodin Dekhi Nai Tumi"	Sheikh Sadi Khan	Kumar Sanu	
1993	Sotyom Shibom Sundorom	"Kichu Tumi Bolo"	Babul Bose	Kumar Sanu	
1993	Sotyom Shibom Sundorom	"O Batash Khola Batash"	Babul Bose	solo	
1993	Sotyom Shibom Sundorom	"Sotyom Shibom Sundorom"	Babul Bose	Alka Yagnik, Sukhwinder Singh, Keya, Pritha	
1994	Chorom Aghat	"Tomar Dushtu Duti Haat"	Alauddin Ali	Abhijeet Bhattacharya	
1994	Chorom Aghat	"Bhalobasha Amader Praner Bondhon"	Alauddin Ali	Bhupinder Singh, Mitali Mukherjee	
1994	Geet Sangeet	"Chokher Bhasha Jodi" (female)	Mrinal Mukhopadhyay	solo	
1994	Kalpurush	"Bhorero Akashe Sobuj Mone"	Kanu Bhattacharya	solo	
1994	Kotha Chilo	"Chokhe Jodi Jol Kore Tolomol"	Bappi Lahiri	solo	
1994	Kotha Chilo	"Tui Je Maar Chokher Moni"	Bappi Lahiri	solo	
1994	Kotha Chilo	"Bhange Jodi Khelaghor"	Bappi Lahiri	solo	
1995	Priyo Tumi	"Jite Gechi"	Alauddin Ali	Udit Narayan, Kavita Krishnamurthy	
1995	Priyo Tumi	"Amader Prithibite"	Alauddin Ali	Kumar Sanu, Uma Khan	
1996	Ajante	"Khokon Re Tui Ekbar"	Satya Saha	solo	
1996	Ajante	"Jibon Theke Bhalobasha"	Satya Saha	solo	
1996	Ajante	"Jedin Tomay Prothom Dekhi"	Satya Saha	solo	
1996	Tomake Chai	"Tumi Amay Korte Sukhi Jibone"	Ahmed Imtiaz Bulbul	Amit Kumar	
1996	Achena Atithi	"Ami Boli Na Boli"	Anu Malik	Kumar Sanu	
1996	Achena Atithi	"Sobar Mukhe Shuni"	Anu Malik	solo	
1996	Achena Atithi	"Shune Hashi Or Chhute Giye"	Anu Malik	solo	
1996	Bazigor	"Esona Esona"	Alauddin Ali	solo	
1996	Bhai Amar Bhai	"Bhai Amar Bhai" (part 1)	Anupam Dutta	solo	
1996	Bhai Amar Bhai	"Bhai Amar Bhai" (part 2)	Anupam Dutta	solo	
1996	Bhai Amar Bhai	"Tumi Amar Jibon Moron"	Anupam Dutta	Abhijeet Bhattacharya	
1997	Amar Ghor Amar Behesht	"Ami Prem Ki Janina"	Anand–Milind	Kabir Bakul	Debashish Dasgupta
1997	Amar Ghor Amar Behesht	"O Priya Priya"	Anand–Milind	Kabir Bakul	Debashish Dasgupta
1997	Amar Ghor Amar Behesht	"Saamne Jar Dekha Pai"	Anand–Milind	Kabir Bakul	
1997	Amar Ghor Amar Behesht	"Protidini Bhalobasha Chai Bondhu"	Anand–Milind	Kabir Bakul	
1997	Joddha	"Uchu Ei Matha"	Anupam Dutta	Abhijeet Bhattacharya	
1997	Joddha	"Ami Noi Aar Ponero Sholo"	Anupam Dutta	solo	
1997	Swami Keno Ashami	"Batas Ta Ese Ki Bole Gelo"	Bappi Lahiri	Kumar Sanu	
1997	Swami Keno Ashami	"Tui Amar Chhoto Bon"	Bappi Lahiri	Runa Laila	
1997	Swami Keno Ashami	"Daadratey Nacho"	Bappi Lahiri	Bappi Lahiri	
1998	Aamar Maa	"Khokon Re Tui Ekbar"	Satya Saha	solo	
1998	Aamar Maa	"Jibon Theke Bhalobasha"	Satya Saha	solo	
1998	Buk Bhora Bhalobasha	Buk Bhora Bhalobasha"	Abu Taher	Kumar Sanu	
1998	Buk Bhora Bhalobasha	"Tumi Je Aamar"	Abu Taher	Abhijeet Bhattacharya	
1998	Debanjali	"Phire Rlo Dol"	Babul Bose	Udit Narayan	
1998	Debanjali	"O Megh Megh Re"	Babul Bose	Udit Narayan	
1998	Debanjali	"Bondhu Sobai Amar Bondhu"	Babul Bose	solo	
1998	Gormil	"O Dinamoni Niyona Biday"		solo	
1998	Shotru Pokkho	"Mon Bhromora Gunguniye"	Alam Khan	solo	
1998	Shotru Pokkho	"Esona Go Aro Kache"	Alam Khan	Kumar Sanu	
1998	Tomar Amar Prem	"Emon Prithibi Chai"	Azad Mintu	solo	
1998	Tomar Amar Prem	"Ogo Sathi Amar"	Azad Mintu	Kumar Sanu	
1998	Nemok Haram	"Ami Kalo Tobu Bhalo"	Bappi Lahiri	Kumar Sanu	
1999	Kali Amar Maa	"Esechhi Tomar Dwaare"	Surajit Chatterjee	solo	
1999	Kali Amar Maa	"Joy Joy Joy Kali Maa"	Surajit Chatterjee	solo	
1999	Rajdanda	"Shonabo Tomay Ajnabi"		solo	
2000	Amader Sansar	"Tomari Poroshe" (female)		solo	
2000	Bhalobashar Chhowa	"E Mone Oi Mon Mileche"	N/A	Kumar Sanu	
2000	Bhalobashar Chhowa	"Kichu Kichu Kotha Sukhe"	N/A	Kumar Sanu	
2000	Bhalobashar Chhowa	"Jiboner Ei Shubho Dine"	N/A	Kumar Sanu	
2000	Sotti Eito Jibon	"Kotha Dilam Kono Dino"	Amar Haldipur	Udit Narayan	
2001	Aaghat	"Amra Juge Juge"	Babul Bose	Babul Supriyo	
2001	Churiwala	"Tumi Bajale O Bashi"	Satya Saha, Emon Saha	solo	
2001	Jamaibabu Zindabad	"Sei To Tomar Kache Elam Phire"	Babul Bose	Udit Narayan	
2001	Shesh Ashroy	"Ektu Pore Brishti Jani"	Anupam Dutta	solo	
2003	Raktha Bandhan	"Kichu Kichu Kotha"	Bappi Lahiri	Babul Supriyo	
2004	Ami Je Ke Tomar	"Ki Aporup Rup Dekhi"	Amit Dasgupta	solo	
2004	Deshdrohi	"Ektai Chand Jeno"	Bappi Lahiri	Kumar Sanu	
2004	Prem Korechi Besh Korechi	"Ninda Kore Koruk Loke"	Alauddin Ali	Udit Narayan	
2004	Swami Chintai	"Kato Bhalobasi"	Babul Bose	Kumar Sanu	
2005	Agnipath	"Sedin Godhuli Khone"	Indrajith	Kumar Sanu	
2005	Chore Chore Mastuto Bhai	"Dekha Holo Dekha"	Ashok Bhadra	Babul Supriyo	
2005	Devi	"Maa Go Noy Tumi"	Ashok Bhadra	solo	
2005	Meher Nigar	"Holud Gadar Phul"	Ahmed Imtiaz Bulbul, Emon Saha	solo	
2005	Meher Nigar	"Priyo Emono Raat"	Ahmed Imtiaz Bulbul, Emon Saha	solo	
2005	Rajmohol	"Tumi Mone Rekho"	Ashok Bhadra	Kumar Sanu	
2005	Shakal Sandhya	"Ami Hero Hobo"	Ashok Bhadra	solo	
2007	Jai Jagannath	"Jai Maa Kamala"	Akshya Mohanty		
2007	Jai Jagannath	"Bejaan Phool"	Akshya Mohanty		
2007	Prem	"Aaj Bristi Saradin"	Ashok Bhadra	Kumar Sanu	
2008	Biyer Lagna	"O Jibon O Jibon"	Devendranath Chattopadhyay	solo	
2008	Biyer Lagna	"Jamai Seje Aaj"	Devendranath Chattopadhyay	Babul Supriyo	
2009	Krodh	"Jiboner Alor Disha"		solo	
2012	Mayuri	"Bangla Ke Piche"	N/A	Anupama Deshpande	
2012	Mayuri	"Due Due Char"	N/A	solo	
2012	Mayuri	"Gaibo Ami Kokil	N/A	solo	
2014	Amardeep	"Prithibite Bhalobasha Nei Bole"		solo	
2014	Ek Megh Ek Rode Ek Brishti	"Ektu Asha Bhalobasha" (solo)		solo	
2014	Ek Megh Ek Rode Ek Brishti	"Ektu Asha Bhalobasha" (duet)		Kumar Sanu	
2016	Love 16	"Ekla Eka Bose Thaka"	Sarbarish Majumdar	Kumar Sanu	

=== Bengali non-film songs ===
Year	Film	Song	Composer(s)	Co-artist(s)
1987	Sujon Kanai	"Sujon Kanai"	Bhushan Kumar	solo
1987	Sujon Kanai	"Tomar Moner Moto"	Bhushan Kumar	solo
1987	Sujon Kanai	"Duti Pakhi Hoye"	Bhushan Kumar	solo
1987	Sujon Kanai	"Bhora Phagun Mase"	Bhushan Kumar	solo
1987	Sujon Kanai	"Bangla Amar Maa"	Bhushan Kumar	solo
1997	Ogo Ruposhi	"Pakhider Jana Nei"	Bhushan Kumar	solo
1998	Sagor Bonno	"Bondhu Tomaar Haat Dhore"	Ajoy Das	Amit Kumar
1998	Sagor Bonno	"Tumi Je Amay Jagale"	Ajoy Das	Udit Narayan
1998	Sagor Bonno	"Dheu Je Chhilam"	Ajoy Das	solo

== Hindi songs ==
=== 1970s ===
==== 1973 ====
Film	Song	Composer(s)	Writer(s)	Co-artist(s)
Abhimaan	"Omkaram Bindu Sanyuktam"	S. D. Burman	Majrooh Sultanpuri	solo

==== 1976 ====
Film	Song	Composer(s)	Writer(s)	Co-artist(s)
Aaj Ka Ye Ghar	"Bichhu Ban Raaton Mein"	Anil–Arun	M. G. Hashmat	solo
Aaj Ka Ye Ghar	"Come On Baby, Let's Dance"	Anil–Arun	M. G. Hashmat	Adolf
Aap Beati	"Hum Toh Garib Hain"	Laxmikant–Pyarelal	Anand Bakshi	solo
Bhagwaan Samaye Sansar Mein	"Jai Jai Laxmi Maata"	Anil–Arun	B. D. Mishra	solo
Bhagwaan Samaye Sansar Mein	"Bhagwan Samaye Sansar Mein"	Anil–Arun	B. D. Mishra	Mukesh
Bhagwaan Samaye Sansar Mein	"Hota Hain Anyay Yahaan"	Anil–Arun	B. D. Mishra	Mahendra Kapoor
Jaaneman	"Aayegi Aayegi Aayegi, Kisi Ko Hamari Yaad Aayegi" (version 2)	Laxmikant–Pyarelal	Anand Bakshi	solo
Jaaneman	"Siyavar Ramchandra Ki Jai"	Laxmikant–Pyarelal	Anand Bakshi	Vinod Sharma, Anand Kunar C., Manna Dey
Kalicharan	"Ek Batta Do, Do Batte Chaar"	Kalyanji–Anandji	Inderjeet Singh Tulsi	Kanchal
Laila Majnu	"Laila Majnu Do Badan Ek Jaan The" (version 1)	Jaidev	Sahir Ludhianvi	Rajkumar Rizvi, Preeti Sagar
Sangram	"Dildar Hamare Dil Ko Tum"	Bappi Lahiri	Gauhar Kanpuri	Mohammed Rafi, Kishore Kumar
Udhar Ka Sindoor	"O Dil Jaani, Bol Meri Raani"	Rajesh Roshan	Majrooh Sultanpuri	Kishore Kumar

==== 1977 ====
Film	Song	Composer(s)	Writer(s)	Co-artist(s)
Aadmi Sadak Ka	"Bura Na Maano Yaar Dosti Mein"	Ravi	Verma Malik	Mohammed Rafi, Deven Verma
Alibaba Marjina	"Main Hoon Kaafir Mast Haseena"	Usha Khanna	Kulwant Jani	Asha Bhosle
Anurodh	"Aate Jaate Khubsoorat Awara Sadkon Pe" (female)	Laxmikant–Pyarelal	Anand Bakshi	solo
Apnapan	"Ek Din Mein Saur Baar Karti Hoon"	Laxmikant–Pyarelal	Anand Bakshi	Dilraj Kaur
Baba Taraknath (Dubbed)	"Tum Hi Surya, Tum Hi Chandra"	Neeta Sen	Kavi Pradeep	solo
Baba Taraknath (Dubbed)	"Bhole Baba Paar Lagao"	Neeta Sen	Kavi Pradeep	solo
Chhota Baap	"Aansuon Ko Thaam Le" (female)	Bharat Vyas	solo	
Ek Hi Rasta	"Bin Saathi Ke Jeevan Kya"	Rajesh Roshan	Verma Malik	Kishore Kumar
Farishta Ya Qatil	"Kaali Kaali Zulfon Mein Kas Loobgi Raja"	Kalyanji–Anandji	Anjaan	Usha Timothy
Farishta Ya Qatil	"Ishq Mein Hum Toh Jaan Se Guzar Jaayenge"	Kalyanji–Anandji	Anjaan	Mohammed Rafi, Kishore Kumar, Usha Mangeshkar
Gayatri Mahima	"Nrutya - Tillana"	Chitragupt	Bharat Vyas	solo
Jai Dwarkadheesh	"Hey Deva, Hey Deva, Hey Jai Jai Ganpati Deva"	Ajay Swami	Bharat Vyas	Dilraj Kaur
Jay Vejay	"Ya Habibi"	Rajesh Roshan	Majrooh Sultanpuri	solo
Mandir Masjid	"Hum Tum Pe Maar Mitenge"	Sharda	Aish Kanwal	Mohammed Rafi, Jani Babu Qawwal, Dilraj Kaur
Ooparwala Jane	"Sarkaar Mere, Mere Huzoor, Mere Khuda Bhi Aap Hain"	Laxmikant–Pyarelal	Kaifi Azmi	Vinod Mehra
Paapi	"Doha"	Bappi Lahiri	Kulwant Jani	solo
Phir Janam Lenge Hum	"He Bansiwale, Teri Gali Aaye Hain Gwale"	Bappi Lahiri	Gauhar Kanpuri	Mohammed Rafi, Aarti Mukherjee
Shirdi Ke Sai Baba	"Saibaba Bolo Dagmag Jag Yeh Bol"	Pandurang Dixit	Manoj Kumar	Manoj Kumar, Mohammed Rafi, Anup Jalota, Jani Babu Qawwal
Thief of Baghdad	"O Balma, Mere Balma"	Laxmikant–Pyarelal	Anand Bakshi	solo

==== 1978 ====
Film	Song	Composer(s)	Writer(s)	Co-artist(s)
Aahutee	"Bharat Ka Bhai Lachhman" (version 1)	Laxmikant–Pyarelal	Anand Bakshi	Mahendra Kapoor
Aahutee	"Naukri Sau Ki, Hazaar Ki"	Laxmikant–Pyarelal	Anand Bakshi	Kishore Kumar
Amar Shakti	"Amar Hai Shakti"	Laxmikant–Pyarelal	Anand Bakshi	Kishore Kumar, Mohammed Rafi, Chandrani Mukherjee
Atithee	"Rang Birange Nazaare"	Kalyanji–Anandji	Verma Malik	Kishore Kumar
Atithee	"Gaa Ke Jiyo Toh Geet Hai Yeh Zindagi"	Kalyanji–Anandji	Verma Malik	Kishore Kumar, Kanchan
Badaltey Rishtey	"Gumsum Si Koyi Khoyi"	Laxmikant–Pyarelal	Anjaan	Kishore Kumar
Besharam	"Yeh Raaz-e-Dil Tumhara"	Kalyanji–Anandji	Yogesh	solo
Daaku Aur Jawaan	"Dharti Gaaye Re, Aaye Khushi Ke Din"	Laxmikant–Pyarelal	Anand Bakshi	Mohammed Rafi, Mukesh
Daaku Aur Jawaan	"Mere Desh Ke Rang Pyare Pyare Nyare Nyare"	Laxmikant–Pyarelal	Anand Bakshi	Mohammed Rafi
Do Musafir	"Tere Jaisa Saagar Mein Moti Nahin"	Kalyanji–Anandji	Indeevar	Kishore Kumar
Ek Aurat Do Joote	"Mardon Ka Tu Naam Bigaade"	Pinakin Shah	Uday Khanna	Anwar
Jaani Dushman	"O Meri Jaan"	Laxmikant–Pyarelal	Verma Malik	Kishore Kumar
Khoon Ki Pukaar	"Mere Munne Mere Jeevan"	Bappi Lahiri	Gauhar Kanpuri	solo
Main Tulsi Tere Aangan Ki	"Nathaniyan Jo Daali"	Laxmikant–Pyarelal	Anand Bakshi	Hemlata
Nasbandi	"Humein Toh Maar Diya Kashti Topiwalon Ne"	Kalyanji–Anandji	Rajendra Krishan	Usha Timothy
Nasbandi	"Prabhuji De Do Ek Santaan"	Kalyanji–Anandji	Indeevar	solo
Saajan Bina Suhagan	"Jijaji Jijaji, Honewala Jijaji"	Usha Khanna	Indeevar	Dilraj Kaur, Suresh Wadkar
Saajan Bina Suhagan	"Madhuban Khushboo Deta Hai" (duet)	Usha Khanna	Indeevar	K. J. Yesudas
Sampoorna Sant Darshanam	"Ek Jungli Tota Zaalim"	Jeetu–Tapan	Vishweshwar Sharma	solo
Sultan-e-Hind	"Parda Toh Hai Husn Ki Azmat"	Iqbal Qureshi	Naseem Ajmeri	Dilraj Kaur

==== 1979 ====
Film	Song	Composer(s)	Writer(s)	Co-artist(s)
Aakhri Insaaf	"Meri Aankhen Teri Sapne Din Raat Dekhe"	Rajesh Roshan	Kulwant Jani	Amit Kumar
Aladdin and The Wonderful Lamp	"Banda Parwar Mohabbat Ka Salaam Le Lijiye"	Chitragupt	Kafil Azar	Mohammed Rafi, Manna Dey
Amar Deep	"Tum Nahin Maanoge"	Laxmikant–Pyarelal	Anand Bakshi	Kishore Kumar
Aulea-e-Islam	"Shaadi Kar Ke Ban Gaye Hum Toh"	Jani Babu Qawwal	Gauhar Kanpuri	Mahendra Kapoor
Dooriyaan	"Zindagi Mein Jab Tunhare Gham Nahin The"	Jaidev	Sudarshan Fakir	Bhupinder Singh
Dooriyaan	"Zindagi Zindagi Mere Ghar Aana"	Jaidev	Sudarshan Fakir	Bhupinder Singh
Guru Ho Jaa Shuru	"Jitne Bhi Woh Jaayenge Door"	Kalyanji–Anandji	Rajendra Krishan	solo
Guru Ho Jaa Shuru	"Are Aisa Bhi Na Husn Ka Guroor Kijiye"	Kalyanji–Anandji	Rajendra Krishan	Shailendra Singh
Jaan-e-Bahaar	"Dil Mila Le O Abdulla"	Bappi Lahiri	Gauhar Kanpuri	Chandrani Mukherjee
Jai Mahakali	"Nacho Re Nacho, Jangal Mein Mangal"	S. N. Tripathi	B. D. Mishra	solo
Krishna Sudama	"Mera Saath Chhod Ke Tu Kahan Jaayega"	Neeta Sen	Kavi Pradeep	solo
Lahu Ke Do Rang	"Mathe Ki Bindiya Bole" (happy)	Farooq Kaiser	Mohammed Rafi	
Lahu Ke Do Rang	"Mathe Ki Bindiya Bole" (sad)	Farooq Kaiser	Mohammed Rafi	
Maan Apmaan	"Yeh Geet Kaun Mere Mann Madhuban Mein Gaa Raha"	Laxmikant–Pyarelal	Bharat Vyas	Mohammed Rafi
Magroor	"Shyam Tumhara Main Naam Pukaroon"	Laxmikant–Pyarelal	Anand Bakshi	Mahendra Kapoor
Mr. Natwarlal	"Qayamat Hai"	Rajesh Roshan	Anand Bakshi	Mohammed Rafi
Prem Vivah	"Pyaar Hai Jeevan"	Laxmikant–Pyarelal	Anand Bakshi	Shailendra Singh
Solva Sawan	"Bua Bakri Laayi Handi"	Jaidev	Naqsh Lyallpuri	K. J. Yesudas
Saahas	"Ab Tum Ho Hamare"	Amin–Sangeet	Yogesh	Bhupinder Singh
Saahas	"Aa Gaya Hai Din Suhana"	Amin–Sangeet	Yogesh	Bhupinder Singh, Dilraj Kaur
Shikshaa	"Chhan Chhan Baj Rahi Ghungroo"	Bappi Lahiri	Gauhar Kanpuri	Shailendra Singh
Yuvraaj	"O Chanda Jiya Chahe Tujhe"	Laxmikant–Pyarelal	Anand Bakshi	solo

=== 1980s ===
==== 1980 ====
Film	Song	Composer(s)	Writer(s)	Co-artist(s)
Be-Reham	"Yeh Saal Ki Aakhri Raat Hai"	Laxmikant–Pyarelal	Verma Malik	Shailendra Singh, Chandrani Mukherjee
Do Aur Do Paanch	"Soti Hai Yeh Raat, Sone Do"	Rajesh Roshan	Anjaan	Kishore Kumar
Do Premee	"Paayaliya Chhanki Ke Na"	Laxmikant–Pyarelal	Anand Bakshi	Mohammed Rafi
Ek Baar Phir	"Jeevan Ek Sauda Hai"	Raghunath Seth	Vinod Pande	solo
Ek Baar Phir	"Yeh Paude Yeh Patte Yeh Phool"	Raghunath Seth	Vinod Pande	Bhupinder Singh
Judaai	"Bansi Bajaao, Bansi Bajaiya"	Laxmikant–Pyarelal	Anand Bakshi	Kishore Kumar
Judaai	"Tere Naam Ke Hum Deewane Hain"	Laxmikant–Pyarelal	Anand Bakshi	Amit Kumar, Shailendra, Chandrani Mukherjee
Kaala Pani	"Ho Mere Saiyan Ji Bade Harjaee"	Laxmikant–Pyarelal	Anand Bakshi	Hemlata
Karz	"Kamaal Hain Kamaal Hain"	Laxmikant–Pyarelal	Anand Bakshi	Kishore Kumar, Manna Dey
Khel Mukaddar Ka	"Main Jaipur Ki Hoon Chhori"	Shardul Kwatra	Munsif	Varineer
Khel Mukaddar Ka	"Goriye Roop Tera Gulzar"	Shardul Kwatra	Munsif	Mahendra Kapoor
Krishna Bhakta Sudama	"Mera Saath Chhod Ke Tu Kahan Gaya"	Neeta Sen	Kavi Pradeep	solo
Nishana	"O Gori Shejar Ki Chhori"	Laxmikant–Pyarelal	Anand Bakshi	Kishore Kumar
Shiv Shakti	"Abhi Abhi Haathon Mein Mehndi Rachi Hai"	Chitragupt	Bharat Vyas	solo
Unees Bees	"Raghupati Raghav Raja Ram"	Rajesh Roshan	Amit Khanna, Meera Bai	Mohammed Rafi, Nitin Mukesh

==== 1981 ====
Film	Song	Composer(s)	Writer(s)	Co-artist(s)
Chhupa Chhupi	"Dheere Dheere Lo Kanha"	Bhuvan Hari	Lokendra	solo
Chhupa Chhupi	"Lo Shuru Ho Gaya"	Bhuvan Hari	Lokendra	solo
Chhupa Chhupi	"O Meri Lala Suno"	Bhuvan Hari	Lokendra	Suresh Wadkar
Chhupa Chhupi	"Motor Chalegi Pum Pum Pum"	Bhuvan Hari	Lokendra	Suresh Wadkar
Ek Duuje Ke Liye	"Mere Jeevan Saathi Pyaar Kiye Jaa"	Laxmikant–Pyarelal	Anand Bakshi	S. P. Balasubrahmanyam
Haqdaar	"Jiyo Jiyo"	Kalyanji–Anandji	Rajendra Krishan	Hemlata
Itni Si Baat	"Dheere Dheere Aankh Ladi"	Kalyanji–Anandji	Anjaan	Kishore Kumar
Madine Ki Galiyan	"Mujhko Mere Naseeb Ne Yeh Din Dikha Diya"	Raj Ratan	Kafil Azar	solo
Madine Ki Galiyan	"Aap Jabse Khayalon Mein Aabe Lage"	Raj Ratan	Kafil Azar	solo
Madine Ki Galiyan	"Ae Mere Khuda Sun Le, Chha Jaaye Khudaya Teri"	Raj Ratan	Kafil Azar	solo
Main Aur Mera Haathi	"Tere Liye Yeh Saare Nazaare"	Kalyanji–Anandji	Maya Govind	Kishore Kumar
Prem Geet	"Aao Mil Jaayen Hum"	Jagjit Singh	Indeevar	Suresh Wadkar
Prem Geet	"Dekh Lo Awaaz De Kar"	Jagjit Singh	Indeevar	solo
Sadka Kamiwaale Ka	"Ghungroo Baaje Chham Chham Chham "	Yunus Malik	Minu Mahendra	solo
Sheetala Mata	"O Maa Sheetla"	Sapan-Jagmohan	Kapil Kumar	Mahendra Kapoor
Sheetala Mata	"O Meri Mata"	Sapan-Jagmohan	Kapil Kumar	Mahendra Kapoor
Sheetala Mata	"Suno Suno Ji" (version 1)	Sapan-Jagmohan	Kapil Kumar	Chandrani Mukherjee
Sheetala Mata	"Suno Suno Ji" (version 2)	Sapan-Jagmohan	Kapil Kumar	Dilraj Kaur
Sheetala Mata	"Maata Ka Vrat Rakhne"	Sapan-Jagmohan	Kapil Kumar	Dilraj Kaur
Sharda	"Kaahe Bindiya Lagayi Maine"	Laxmikant–Pyarelal	Anand Bakshi	Mohammed Rafi
Yeh Rishta Na Tootay	"Rimjhim Rimjhim Badra Barse"	Kalyanji–Anandji	Anjaan	Suresh Wadkar
Yeh Rishta Na Tootay	"Aao Aao Sakhiyan Aao Ri"	Kalyanji–Anandji	Maya Govind	solo
Yeh Kaisa Nasha Hai	"Humse Mil Jao Kabhi Raat Ki Tanhayi Mein"	Chand Pardesi	D S Sultania	Aziz Nazan

==== 1982 ====
Film	Song	Composer(s)	Writer(s)	Co-artist(s)
Aadarshila	"Yeh Jag Jhootha Hai, Jhoothi Hai Duniya"	Ranjit Kapoor	Ranjit Kapoor	solo
Aagaman	"Yeh Daag Daag Ujala" (version 1)	Ustad Ghulam Mustafa Khan	Faiz Ahmed Faiz	solo
Aagaman	"Yeh Daag Daag Ujala" (version 3)	Ustad Ghulam Mustafa Khan	Faiz Ahmed Faiz	solo
Aagaman	"Chhoone Na Doongi Sharir"	Ustad Ghulam Mustafa Khan	Faiz Ahmed Faiz	solo
Anmol Sitare	"Apne Hindustan Ke Sunder"	Nadeem–Shravan	Kavi Pradeep	Anwar
Badle Ki Aag	"Jawani Mein Aate Hain"	Laxmikant–Pyarelal	Verma Malik	Suresh Wadkar, Amit Kumar, Alka Yagnik
Beti	"Darshan Pyasi" (duet)	Cuckoo Singh	Dev Kohli	Suresh Wadkar
Bhai akhir Bhai Hoti Hai	"Piya Ke Ghar Aaj Aaye Dulhaniya"	Chand Pardesi	Chander Oberoi	Rafiq Sagar
Gul-e-Bakavali	"Nafrat Chhupi Huyi Haath"	Rajesh Roshan	Indeevar	Kishore Kumar
Jeeo Aur Heene Do	"Choodi Ki Chhun Chhun"	Laxmikant–Pyarelal	Verma Malik	solo
Jeevan Dhaara	"Jaldi Se Aa Mere Pardesi Bulbul"	Laxmikant–Pyarelal	Anand Bakshi	Alka Yagnik, Kavita Krishnamurthy
Khush Naseeb	"Sun Bhaiya, Sun Bhaiya"	Kalyanji–Anandji	Farooq Kaiser	Suresh Wadkar, Amit Kumar
Log Kya Kahenge	"Mere Pyaar Ki Nakaami Ne Mujhe"	Kalyanji–Anandji	Indeevar	solo
Maine Jeena Seekh Liya	"Luk Chhup Jaana, Makai Da Daana"	Nadeem–Shravan	Surendra Sathi	solo
Mehandi Rang Layegi	"Koi Jaane Ya Na Jaane"	Laxmikant–Pyarelal	Anjaan	Suresh Wadkar
Nek Parveen	"Bheegi Fiza Mehki Hawa"	Iqbal Qureshi	Naseem Ajmeri, S. H. Bihari, Aish Kanwal	Suresh Wadkar
Nek Parveen	"Fariyad Hain Tunse Meri"	Iqbal Qureshi	Naseem Ajmeri, S. H. Bihari, Aish Kanwal	solo
Nek Parveen	"Mohabbat Aisi Hoti Hai"	Iqbal Qureshi	Naseem Ajmeri, S. H. Bihari, Aish Kanwal	Krishna Kalle
Pyar Ke Rahi	"Daiyya Ri Daiyya, Main Toh Bhayi Dang Holi Mein"	Aziz Nazan	Maya Govind	solo
Raaste Pyaar Ke	"Log Jal Gaye"	Laxmikant–Pyarelal	Anand Bakshi	Kishore Kumar
Ramnagri	"Man Ke Darpan Mein Chehra"	Jaidev	Naqsh Lyallpuri	Hariharan
Shiv Charan	"Yeh Husm Yeh Shabab"	Bappi Lahiri	Gauhar Kanpuri, Amit Khanna	Anwar
Sultan-e-Deccan Banda Nawaz	"Yeh Aankhen Tumhari"	Abid Shah	Malik Anwar, Abid Shah	Bhupinder Singh
Sultan-e-Deccan Banda Nawaz	"Parwardigaara"	Abid Shah	Malik Anwar, Abid Shah	solo
Sultan-e-Deccan Banda Nawaz	"Bigdi Bana De"	Abid Shah	Malik Anwar, Abid Shah	solo
Sun Sajna	"Sun Sajna" (part 1)	Raam Laxman	Ravinder Rawal	K. J. Yesudas
Sun Sajna	"Sun Sajna" (part 2)	Raam Laxman	Ravinder Rawal	K. J. Yesudas
Sun Sajna	"Sun Sajna" (part 3)	Raam Laxman	Ravinder Rawal	solo
Taaqat	"Hothon Pe Aaye Sari Duyayen"	Laxmikant–Pyarelal	Anand Bakshi	Mohammed Rafi
Taaqat	"Hum Bhi Yahan, Tum Bhi Yahan"	Laxmikant–Pyarelal	Anand Bakshi	Kishore Kumar, Hemlata
Teesri Aankh	"Eid Ke Din Gale Mil Le Raja"	Laxmikant–Pyarelal	Anand Bakshi	Mohammed Rafi, Manna Dey, Krishna Mukherjee
Vidhaata	"Saat Saheliyan"	Kalyanji–Anandji	Anand Bakshi	Hemlata, Kishore Kumar, Sadhana Sargam, Alka Yagnik, Shivangi Kolhapure, Padmini Kolhapure, Kanchan
Yaar Dilber	"Sai Sai Bolo"	Amin–Sangeet	Subhash Indori	solo
Yeh Nazdeekiyan	"Maine Ek Geet Likha Hai"	Raghunath Seth	J. P. Dixit	solo
Yeh Nazdeekiyan	"Ek Daur Woh Bhi Tha"	Raghunath Seth	Kaifi Azmi	solo

==== 1983 ====
Film	Song	Composer(s)	Writer(s)	Co-artist(s)
Chor Mandli	"Haye Re Shabab Aur Woh Dil Ka Zamana"	Kalyanji–Anandji	G. L. Rawal	Manna Dey, Mohammed Rafi, Hemlata
Coolie	"Jawaani Ki Rail Kahin Chhoot Na Jaaye"	Laxmikant–Pyarelal	Anand Bakshi	Shabbir Kumar
Doud Dhoop	"Meri Jaan Kuchh Din Nibhaya Jo Hota"	Naresh–Hansraj	Ramprasad	Sulakshana Pandit
Grahasthi	"Kisi Pehlu Se Laage Na"	Ravindra Jain	Ravindra Jain	Kishore Kumar
Hero	"Ding Dong"	Laxmikant–Pyarelal	Anand Bakshi	Manhar Udhas
Hero	"Tu Mera Hero Hai"	Laxmikant–Pyarelal	Anand Bakshi	Manhar Udhas
Kahan Tak Aasmaan Hai	"Aao Wahaan Tanhayi Mein Tehlen"	Raghunath Seth	Kaifi Azmi	Bhupinder Singh
Kalaakaar	"Khoye Khoye Raahen Teri Chaahon Mein"	Kalyanji–Anandji	Indeevar	Kishore Kumar
Kalaakaar	"Mera Pyaar Mujhse Rootha"	Kalyanji–Anandji	Indeevar	Suresh Wadkar
Kaun Hai Woh?	"Jai Jai Note Hare"	Kamal Kant	Jalal Jhansvi	Suresh Wadkar, Alka Yagnik, Vaasi
Kaun Hai Woh?	"Haye Haye Haye Saiyan Tose Jaane Kaise Naina Lad Gaye"	Kamal Kant	Asad Bhopali	solo
Kaun Hai Woh?	"Haye Allah Yeh Mard Hai Kaise"	Kamal Kant	Asad Bhopali	Alka Yagnik
Lal Chunariyaa	"Na Mohabbat Ke Liye Hain Na Ibadat"	Shyamji–Ghanshyamji	Kulwant Jani	solo
Mausam Suhana	"Khud Ko Khuda Na Samjho"	Vasant Dalal	Dipak Jaunpuri	Manna Dey
Mausam Suhana	"Teri Radha Roye"	Vasant Dalal	Dipak Jaunpuri	solo
Mausam Suhana	"Tujhe Kaise Main Manaoon Mere Saanwre"	Vasant Dalal	Dipak Jaunpuri	solo
Raaste Aur Rishte	"Janakpur Mein Ram" (version 1)	Usha Khanna	Yogesh	Suresh Wadkar
Raaste Aur Rishte	"Janakpur Mein Ram" (version 2)	Usha Khanna	Yogesh	Suresh Wadkar
Rang Birangi	"Kabhi Kuchh Pal Jeevan Ke"	R D Burman	Yogesh	Aarti Mukherjee
Souten	"Meri Pehle Hi Tang Thi Choli"	Usha Khanna	Saawan Kumar Tak	Kishore Kumar
Talabandi	"Abhi Abhi Toh Pyaar Hua Hai"	Dhiraj Kumar	Prashant Raipuri	Mehboob Chauhan
Vaasta	"Pani Banni Zamane Se Nirala Hai"	Ajit Varman	Abhilash	solo
Woh Saat Din	"Mere Dil Se Dillagi Na Kar"	Laxmikant–Pyarelal	Anand Bakshi	Kishore Kumar

==== 1984 ====
Film	Song	Composer(s)	Writer(s)	Co-artist(s)
Aa Jao Ghar Tumhara	"O Mere Man Je Moti"	Kalyanji–Anandji	Anjaan	solo
All-Rounder	"Paanch Ungliyon Ki"	Laxmikant–Pyarelal	Anand Bakshi	Alka Yagnik, Amit Kumar, Mahendra Kapoor
Asha Jyoti	"Teri Paayal Ki Jhankaar"	Laxmikant–Pyarelal	Anjaan	Kishore Kumar
Bhatakte Kadam	"Mausam Deewana Hai"	Ganga Sagar	Satish Tiwari	Shabbir Kumar
Bhatkee Rahi	"Saathi Mere Bachpan Ke Pyaar Bhara Dil Ko Tod Diya"	Kamal Makhdoom	Anwar Warsi	solo
Dozakh	"Khamoshi Jab Hadh Se Badhi"	Ganesh Sharma	Mahendra Dalvi	Suresh Wadkar
Ek Nai Paheli	"Jaanun Teri Batiyaan"	Laxmikant–Pyarelal	Anand Bakshi	solo
Farishta	"Main Peeoonga, Janab Peeoonga"	R D Burman	Anand Bakshi	Amit Kumar
Farishta	"Bade Logon Ki Badi Badi Baaton Se" (version 1)	R D Burman	Anand Bakshi	Suresh Wadkar, Amit Kumar, Vivek Bajaj, Kavita Krishnamurthy
Farishta	"Bade Logon Ki Badi Badi Baaton Se" (version 2)	R D Burman	Anand Bakshi	Suresh Wadkar, Amit Kumar, Vivek Bajaj
Ghar Ek Mandir	"Romantic Duet"	Laxmikant–Pyarelal	Anand Bakshi	Suresh Wadkar
Insaaf Kaun Karega	"Iqraar Karen Kis Se"	Laxmikant–Pyarelal	S. H. Bihari	solo
Insaaf Kaun Karega	"Mujre Ki Shaam Aakhri"	Laxmikant–Pyarelal	Sameer	solo
Insaaf Kaun Karega	"Meherbanon Ko Mera Salaam"	Laxmikant–Pyarelal	Sameer	solo
Kiski Biwi	"Yeh Chanchal Hawayen"	Vijay Batalvi	Sudhakar Sharma	Usha Sindhu
Lakhon Ki Baat	"Reshmi Gul Zara Kijiye"	Manas Mukherjee	Yogesh	solo
Lakhon Ki Baat	"Ek Tum Ho Jaise"	Manas Mukherjee	Yogesh	solo
Love Marriage	"O Neeli Chhatriwaali"	Anu Malik	Hasrat Jaipuri	Shabbir Kumar
Love Marriage	"Apna Jeevan Rail Ki Patri"	Anu Malik	Hasrat Jaipuri	Shabbir Kumar
Milenge Kabhi	"Tumhare Liye Hi Liya Hai Janam"	Sapan–Jagmohan	Mahendra Dalvi	Suresh Wadkar
Milenge Kabhi	"Tere Bin Mera Yeh Jag Soona"	Sapan–Jagmohan	Mahendra Dalvi	Suresh Wadkar
Milenge Kabhi	"Oh Mitwa"	Sapan–Jagmohan	Mahendra Dalvi	Suresh Wadkar
Milenge Kabhi	"Saiyan Laayega Baraat"	Sapan–Jagmohan	Mahendra Dalvi	solo
Papi Pet Ka Sawaal Hai	"Hum Jinpe Fida"	Shankar–Jaikishan	Hasrat Jaipuri	Sharda
Pratibha	"Yeh Huq Dosti Ka" (version 1)	Sapan–Jagmohan	Mahendra Dalvi	Suresh Wadkar
Pratibha	"Yeh Haq Dosti Ka" (version 2)	Sapan–Jagmohan	Mahendra Dalvi	Suresh Wadkar
Raaj Tilak	"Aa Gaye Rang Jamanewale"	Kalyanji–Anandji	Verma Malik	Kishore Kumar, Alka Yagnik, Sadhana Sargam
Ram Tera Desh	"Dulhan Bana Ke Mujhe"	Anu Malik	Verma Malik	solo
Shravan Kumar	"Main Toh Ho Gayi Re"	Bappi Lahiri	Pradeep	solo
Shravan Kumar	"Main Toh Ho Gayi Re" (sad)	Bappi Lahiri	Pradeep	solo
Shravan Kumar	"Na Roko Shravan Ko"	Bappi Lahiri	Pradeep	Mahendra Kapoor, Dilraj Kaur
Tadap (alias Pyase Honth)	"Dilwale O Dilwale"	Laxmikant–Pyarelal	Rajendra Krishan	solo
Triveni	"Kismat Ki Koyi Likhi Baat Ho Tum"	Laxmikant–Pyarelal	Anjaan	Suresh Wadkar
Utsav	"Mere Mann Baaja Mridang"	Laxmikant–Pyarelal	Vasant Dev	Suresh Wadkar, Aarti Mukherjee
Yaadon Ki Zanjeer	"Daroga Babu Likh Ko Hamari Rapat"	Rajesh Roshan	Indeevar	solo

==== 1985 ====
Film	Song	Composer(s)	Writer(s)	Co-artist(s)
Aaj Ke Sholay	"Sheron Ki Santaan Hoon Main"	C. Satyam, Kamal Kant	N/A	Anwar
Aakhir Kyon?	"Saat Rang Mein Khel Rahi Hai"	Rajesh Roshan	Indeevar	Amit Kumar
Anokha Mod	"Mausam Dhale Is Rang Mein"	S. D. Kashyap	S. G. Kashyap	Suresh Wadkar
Apna Jahan	"Tere Mere Sapne Saare Khoye Hain Kahan"	Anu Malik	Amit Khanna	Anu Malik
Apna Jahan	"Tere Mere Sapne Saare Khoye Hain Kahan" (sad)	Anu Malik	Amit Khanna	solo
Asambhav	"Shaam Sinoori Yeh Jo Aa Gayi"	Binoy Hasib	Shyam Anuragi	Nirmal Pandey
Awara Baap	"Na Hoti Dosti Humse"	R D Burman	M G Hashmat	Suresh Wadkar
Bahu Ki Awaaz	"Na Chand Na Maang"	Vijay Batalvi	Rajendra Verma, Bhim Sain, Shabab Alawalpuri	K. J. Yesudas
Bahu Ki Awaaz	"Chand Ko Bana Ke"	Vijay Batalvi	Rajendra Verma, Bhim Sain, Shabab Alawalpuri	K. J. Yesudas
Bhagwan Shri Krishna	"Yashoda Tera Nand Dulara"	Avinash Vyas	Ramkumar Bohra	solo
Bhagwan Shri Krishna	"Jamuna Ke Jal Mein"	Avinash Vyas	Ramkumar Bohra	Gaurang Vyas
Bhed Bhav	"Dharti Pyaar Karti Hain"	Shyamji–Ghanshyamji	Saajan Dehlvi	Mahendra Kapoor
Bhed Bhav	"Di Dil Bichhad Je Reh Gyae Hain" (female)	Shyamji–Ghanshyamji	Saajan Dehlvi	solo
Bhed Bhav	"Tumhare Pyaar Mein"	Shyamji–Ghanshyamji	Saajan Dehlvi	solo
Bhulaye Na Jane	"Mere Humnawa Tera Shukriya"	Anup Jalota	Sardar Anjum	solo
Bhulaye Na Jane	"Tere Pyaar Ki Kasam"	Anup Jalota	Sardar Anjum	solo
Cricketer	"Abhi Main Pyaar Ki Raahon Mein"	DCS (London)	Dr. Shafi Hassan	solo
Cricketer	"Main Kaun Koi Kya Jaane"	DCS (London)	Dr. Shafi Hassan	solo
Dulhan Har Raat Ki	"Aakash Pe Taare Hain"	Hari–Arjun	Kulwant Jani	Mohammed Aziz
Ek Daku Shehar Mein	"Hum Hain Tere, Tu Hamare"	Rajesh Roshan	Majrooh Sultanpuri, Rajesh Roshan, Chander Oberoi	solo
Ek Se Bhale Do	"Band Toh Bajega"	R D Burman	Anjaan	Kishore Kumar, Shailendra
Ganga Kinare	"Aake Bacha Le O Paalanhare"	Jeetu–Tapan	B. D. Mishra	Anup Jalota
Gharwali Baharwali	"Yeh Kya Bekaraari Hai"	Swamy Ameet	Alauddin Naveed	Suresh Wadkar
Gharwali Baharwali	"Saanwli Saloni Rut Aayi"	Swamy Ameet	Sajid Azam	Suresh Wadkar
Hum Dono	"Aaja Mere Paas Aaja"	R D Burman	Anand Bakshi	solo
Hum Naujawan	"Hum Naujawan"	R D Burman	Indeevar	Mohammed Aziz, Suresh Wadkar
I Love You	"Pehli Baar Mile Hain"	Usha Khanna	Yogesh	Kishore Dayaram
I Love You	"Naam Tera Kya Hai"	Usha Khanna	Yogesh	Kishore Dayaram
I Love You	"Aa Mujhe Tu Aakash Mein"	Usha Khanna	Yogesh	solo
Jaanoo	"Jitna Kabhi Kisi Ne Kisi Ko"	Laxmikant–Pyarelal	Jainendra Jain	Manhar Udhas
Jaanoo	"Chakdam Chakdam Pyaar Hai"	Laxmikant–Pyarelal	Jainendra Jain	Manhar Udhas
Jaanoo	"Papa Ki Baaton Ka" (version 1)	Laxmikant–Pyarelal	Jainendra Jain	Manhar Udhas, Rajeshwari
Jaanoo	"Sajna Tu Mujhe Utha Kar Baahon Mein"	Laxmikant–Pyarelal	Jainendra Jain	solo
Jawab	"Jeena Hai Toh Jeena Hai"	Laxmikant–Pyarelal	Anand Bakshi	Manhar Udhas
Kali Basti	"Kis Vaid Ko Nabz Dikhaoon"	Laxmikant–Pyarelal	Anjaan	Mohammed Rafi
Lallu Ram	"Brahmachari Ko Rahi Hai Kaahe Chhed"	Ravindra Jain	Ravindra Jain	Sushil Kumar
Lallu Ram	"Saagar Paar Se"	Ravindra Jain	Ravindra Jain	Shiv Kumar
Mera Jawaab	"Aa Baitha Hoon Dar Pe Tere"	Laxmikant–Pyarelal	Santosh Anand	Manhar Udhas
Mera Jawaab	"Main Usse Itna Pyaar Karta Hoon"	Laxmikant–Pyarelal	Santosh Anand	Manhar Udhas
Mera Jawaab	"Mere Liye Zindagi" (duet)	Laxmikant–Pyarelal	Santosh Anand	Manhar Udhas
Mera Jawaab	"Mere Liye Zindagi" (female)	Laxmikant–Pyarelal	Santosh Anand	solo
Meraa Ghar Mere Bachche	"Mausam Awaazen De Raha Hai" (happy)	Laxmikant–Pyarelal	Anand Bakshi	Shabbir Kumar
Meraa Ghar Mere Bachche	"Mausam Awaazen De Raha Hai" (sad)	Laxmikant–Pyarelal	Anand Bakshi	Shabbir Kumar
Meri Jung	"O Meri Khwabon Ke Shehzaade"	Laxmikant–Pyarelal	Anand Bakshi	solo
Nafrat	"Pyaar Sikha Doon"	Surinder Kohli	Asad Bhopali	Shailendra Singh
Nafrat	"Main Toh Naachungi"	Surinder Kohli	Asad Bhopali	Shabbir Kumar
Paapi Sansaar	"Noor Ke Saanche Mein Bhagwan"	Madan–Chander	Mehboob Sarwar	Shabbir Kumar
Padosi Ki Biwi	"Tumhen Jhamgatta Ashiqon Ka Milega"	Usha Khanna	Hasrat Jaipuri	Anwar
Paisa Yeh Paisa	"Sajna O Sajna"	Usha Khanna	M G Hashmat	Shabbir Kumar
Paisa Yeh Paisa	"Jor Se Bajao Jara Band Baja"	Usha Khanna	M G Hashmat	Mohammed Aziz, Kishore Kumar
Phaansi Ke Baad	"Ho Mehndi Kya Kehti Hai"	Anu Malik	Anand Bakshi	solo
Phir Aayee Barsaat	"Dekho Yeh Chhikri"	Kuldeep Singh	Sudarshan Fakir	Suresh Wadkar
Phir Aayee Barsaat	"Teri Aankhen Hai Manzil"	Kuldeep Singh	Sudarshan Fakir	Suresh Wadkar
Phir Aayee Barsaat	"Meri Tarah Tu Kisi Bewafa Se Pyaar Kare"	Kuldeep Singh	Sudarshan Fakir	solo
Pyaar Jhukta Nahin	"Tumhen Apna Saathi Banane Se Pehle"	Laxmikant–Pyarelal	S. H. Bihari	Lata Mangeshkar, Shabbir Kumar
Ramkali	"Satrah Baras Ki Yeh Albeli"	Sonik–Omi	Verma Malik	Dilraj Kaur
Samay Ki Dhaara	"Maa Meri Maa, Pyari Pyari Maa"	Jugal Kishore–Tilak Raj	M G Hashmat	solo
Sanjhi	"Baadal Umdya Ki Kasam"	Jag Phool Kaushik	Niaz Haider	solo
Sanjhi	"Mohabbat Mein Humein Apna Bana Le"	Jag Phool Kaushik	Niaz Haider	
Sarfarosh	"Saare Shehar Ke Sharabi"	Laxmikant–Pyarelal	Anand Bakshi	Alka Yagnik
Sur Sangam	"Sadho Aisa Hi Guru Bhave"	Laxmikant–Pyarelal	Vasant Dev	Rajan Mishra, Sajan Mishra
Telephone	"Main Tujhse Pyaar Karoon"	Rajesh Roshan	Rajesh Roshan	solo
Teri Meherbaniyan	"Dil Bekaraar Tha, Dil Bekaraar Hai"	Laxmikant–Pyarelal	S. H. Bihari	Shabbir Kumar
Teri Pooja Kare Sansaar	"Jag Se Nirala, Maiya Ka Darbar"	S. Madan	Thakur Tapasvi	Jaspal Singh
Tulsi	"Bhaiya Mere Fauji Re"	Ravindra Jain	Ravindra Jain	Jaspal Singh, Sushil Kumar
Yaadon Ki Kasam	"Chaman Chaman O Jaaneman"°	Laxmikant–Pyarelal	Anand Bakshi	Shabbir Kumar

==== 1986 ====
Film	Song	Composer(s)	Writer(s)	Co-artist(s)
Aag Aur Shola	"Barsa Re Barsa"	Laxmikant–Pyarelal	Anand Bakshi	Manhar Udhas
Aakhree Raasta	"Dance Music"	Laxmikant–Pyarelal	Anand Bakshi	solo
Aap Ke Sath	"Behke Behke Yeh Jazbaat"	Laxmikant–Pyarelal	Anand Bakshi	Mohammed Aziz
Aisa Pyar Kahan	"Pagal Premi Kaise Hote Hain"	Laxmikant–Pyarelal	Anand Bakshi	Shailendra Singh
Amrit	"Duniya Mein Kitna Gham Hai" (Duet)	Laxmikant–Pyarelal	Anand Bakshi	Mohammad Aziz
Amrit	"Duniya Mein Kitna Gham Hai" (female)	Laxmikant–Pyarelal	Anand Bakshi	solo
Amrit	"Jeevan Saathi Saath Saath Mein Rehna"	Laxmikant–Pyarelal	Anand Bakshi	Manhar Udhas
Angaaray	"Mubarak Ho, Mubarak Ho"	Anu Malik	Rajendra Krishan	Suresh Wadkar, Mohammed Aziz
Anokha Insaan	"Tujhe Dil Mein Basaye Rakhte Hain"	Hemraaj	Sagar Dutt	Shabbir Kumar
Anokha Insaan	"Aisi Madira Hai Meri Jawaani Mein"	Hemraaj	P. H. Harfan	solo
Anokha Insaan	"Picnic Yeh Hai Picnic"	Hemraaj	Tajdar Taj	Shabbir Kumar, Krishna Sandhu, Bhupesh Hussanlal
Asli Naqli	"Duniya Bhar Ko Dhokha De Kar"	Laxmikant–Pyarelal	S. H. Bihari	Laxmikant, Shabbir Kumar
Bhabhi Ka Aashirwad	"Chand Nikla Hai"	Dilip Dutta	Gumrah Kainati	solo
Bhagwaan Dada	"Super Fast Love"	Rajesh Roshan	Indeevar	Kishore Kumar
Daku Bijlee	"Jab Se O Sajna"	Anwar–Usman	Khalid	solo
Daku Bijlee	"Qatil Ho Toh Khul Kar Waar Karo"	Anwar–Usman	Qaiser-Ul-Jafri	Majid Shola
Damaad Chahiye	"Nindiya Aang Sapne Aaye"	Ajit Varman	Shaily Shailendra	solo
Ehsaan Aap Ka	"Dekho Yeh Phool Khil Rahe Hain Kaise"	Ravindra Jain	Yogesh	Nitin Mukesh
Ek Aur Sikander	"Aao Aao Luka Chhupi Khelen Hum Tum"	Rajesh Roshan	Majrooh Sultanpuri	Mohammed Aziz
Fitrat	"Aankhon Ke Jaam, Hothon Ke Hum Paimaane Laaye Hain"	Usha Khanna	Nida Fazli	solo
Fitrat	"Har Ghadi Khud Se Ulajhna"	Usha Khanna	Nida Fazli	solo
Ghar Sansar	"Haath Seeta Ka Ram Ko Diya"	Rajesh Roshan	Indeevar	solo
Itni Jaldi Kya Hai	"Itni Jaldi Kya Hai"	Vijay	Vijay	Aarti Mukherjee
Itni Jaldi Kya Hai	"Nazren Mili Nazar Se"	Vijay	Vijay	Shabbir Kumar
Itni Jaldi Kya Hai	"Mala Japoon, Yaad Karoon"	Vijay	Vijay	solo
Itni Jaldi Kya Hai	"Babusha Babusha"	Vijay	Zameer Kazmi	solo
Itni Jaldi Kya Hai	"Zakham-e-Judaai Dheere Dheere"	Vijay	Zameer Kazmi	solo
Kaanch Ki Deewar	"Ari O Sakhi"	Shankar–Jaikishan	Kafil Azar	Sharadrima
Kaanch Ki Deewar	"Jalwon Ki Humare"	Shankar–Jaikishan	Kafil Azar	Sharadrima
Kala Dhanda Goray Log	"Jab Jab Kisi Ladke Ko Kisi Ladki"	Laxmikant–Pyarelal	Anand Bakshi	Shabbir Kumar
Kalank Ka Tika	"Aap Ke Dil Mein Koyi Haq Hai"	Kirti–Anuraag	Ram Siddharth	Suresh Wadkar
Kalank Ka Tika	"Ghar Lootnewale Hi"	Kirti–Anuraag	Ram Siddharth	Suresh Wadkar
Karamdaata	"Dhamak Dhamak Dhaiya Dhaiya"	Anu Malik	Hasrat Jaipuri	Suresh Wadkar, Mohammed Aziz
Karma	"Maine Rab Se Tujhe"	Laxmikant–Pyarelal	Anand Bakshi	Manhar Udhas
Karma	"Aye Mohabbat Teri Dastan"	Laxmikant–Pyarelal	Anand Bakshi	solo
Love 86	"Kismat Apni Khul Gayi"	Laxmikant–Pyarelal	Sameer	Hemlata
Maa Beti	"Paise Bina"	Anand–Milind	Anjaan	solo
Maa Beti	"Mujhko Sadkon Se"	Anand–Milind	Anjaan	solo
Maa Beti	"Maine Apna Sanam Tujhe"	Anand–Milind	Anjaan	Suresh Wadkar
Maa Beti	"Na Maange Heera Moti"	Anand–Milind	Anjaan	Mahendra Kapoor
Maati Balidaan Ki	"Mit na Jaaye"	Ravindra Jain	Ravindra Jain	solo
Maati Balidaan Ki	"Saajan Ghar Jaana Hai"	Ravindra Jain	Ravindra Jain	solo
Main Chup Nahin Rahungi'	"Dekho Dekho Na"	Vijay Batalvi	Ameer Qazalbash	solo
Main Chup Nahin Rahungi'	"Pyaar Ka Khwaab Afhura Hai"	Vijay Batalvi	Ameer Qazalbash	Manhar Udhas
Mazloom	"Sunday Monday Tuesday Wednesday Thursday"	Laxmikant–Pyarelal	S. H. Bihari	Mohammed Aziz
Mazloom	"Kal Hamare Ghar Teri Baarat Aayegi"	Laxmikant–Pyarelal	S. H. Bihari	Mohammed Aziz
Mera Haque	"Bijli Gira Ke"	Anu Malik	Indeevar	Shabbir Kumar
Nagina	"Bhooli Bisri Ek Kahani	Laxmikant–Pyarelal	Anand Bakshi	solo
Nagina	"Tune Bechain Itna Zyada Kiya"	Laxmikant–Pyarelal	Anand Bakshi	Mohammed Aziz
Nain Mile Chain Kahan	"Kanha O Kanha"	Ajay Swami	Naqsh Lyallpuri	Chandrani Mukherjee
Nain Mile Chain Kahan	"Kaise Chhalak Gaya"	Ajay Swami	Naqsh Lyallpuri	Subhas
Naseeb Apna Apna	"Bhala Hai, Bura Hai, Jaisa Bhi Hai"	Laxmikant–Pyarelal	S. H. Bihari	solo
Pahunche Huwe Log	"Koi Keh De In Deewanon Se"	Kalyanji–Anandji	Payam Sayeedi	Suresh Wadkar
Pattharon Ka Shaher	"Yaadon Ka Rishta"	Iqbal Qureshi	G. P. Satish	solo
Pattharon Ka Shaher	"Akhiyan Hai Noor Bhari" (version 1)	Iqbal Qureshi	G. P. Satish	solo
Pattharon Ka Shaher	"Akhiyan Hai Noor Bhari" (version 2)	Iqbal Qureshi	G. P. Satish	solo
Pyaar Ka Pahela Sawan	"Aaj Meri Zindagi Pyar Pyar Hi Gayi"	Sunanji Suman	Naadaan	solo
Pyaar Ka Pahela Sawan	"Yeh Kaisi Fizaayein"	Sunanji Suman	Prawaasi	solo
Pyaar Ka Pahela Sawan	"Ibadat Ki Arzoo Thi Dil Mein"	Sunanji Suman	Mohammed Yasmin	Mohammed Aziz
Pyaasi Mamta	"Hum Pyaar Karte Hain Sanam"	Surinder Kohli	R. V. Singh	solo
Pyaasi Mamta	"Lab Pe Jo Hansi Hogi"	Surinder Kohli	Wali Firozabadi	solo
Pyar Ki Pahli Nazar	"Pyar Ki Pahli Nazar"	Sulochana Manandhar	Nadeem Ajmeri	Chandrani Mukherjee
Pyar Ki Pahli Nazar	"Khuda Rakhe Hazaron Saal"	Sulochana Manandhar	Asad Bhopali	Kumar Sanu
Pyar Ki Pahli Nazar	"Bekaraar Dil Ki Beshumar Dhadkanen"	Sulochana Manandhar	Asad Bhopali	Mohammed Aziz
Qatil Aur Ashiq	"Moti Moti Rotiya Pakana Tu Dhobaniya"	Nadeem–Shravan	Anjaan	Kishore Kumar
Qatil Aur Ashiq	"Sawan Ke Mausam Mein Dil"	Nadeem–Shravan	Anjaan	Suresh Wadkar
Sadaa Suhagan	"Billi Boli Main Aaoon"	Laxmikant–Pyarelal	Anand Bakshi	solo
Sajna Saath Nibhana	"So Jaa, So Jaa"	Jagdish J.	Maya Govind	solo
Sajna Saath Nibhana	"Bindiya Giri Re"	Jagdish J.	Maya Govind	Shailendra Kumar
Samay Ki Dhara	"Ma Meri Pyari Maa"	Jugal Kishore	Tilakraj Thapar	solo
Sasti Dulhan Mahenga Dulha	"Mil Gayi, Mujhe Mil Gayi"	Usha Khanna	Saba Fazli	Mohammed Aziz
Sasti Dulhan Mahenga Dulha	"Pyar Ka Vaada"	Usha Khanna	Saba Fazli	Manhar Udhas
Sasti Dulhan Mahenga Dulha	"Pyar Ja Vaada" (sad)	Usha Khanna	Saba Fazli	Manhar Udhas
Shahadat	"Ek Do Teen Chaar"	Kirti–Anuraag	Dev Kohli, Ram Siddharth	solo
Shahadat	"Chham Chham Boondein"	Kirti–Anuraag	Dev Kohli, Ram Siddharth	solo
Shahadat	"Gungunati Hai Yeh Hawayein"	Kirti–Anuraag	Dev Kohli, Ram Siddharth	solo
Shahadat	"Poochha Hai Yaadon Ne Humse"	Kirti–Anuraag	Dev Kohli, Ram Siddharth	solo
Shingora	"Hothon Ko Chhune Ki"	Kirti–Anuraag	Ram Siddharth	Shailendra Singh
Shingora	"Laage Mohe Pyaara"	Kirti–Anuraag	Ram Siddharth	solo
Sone Ka Pinjara	"Teri Tanhaiyon Ne"	Kirti–Anuraag	Ram Siddharth	Suresh Wadkar
Swarthi	"Mera Kangna Na Hilana"	Sapan–Jagmohan	Vishweshwar Sharma	Anupam Kher
Swarthi	"Pyaar Jeevan Bhar Ka" (part 1)	Sapan–Jagmohan	M. G. Hashmat	Suresh Wadkar
Swarthi	"Pyaar Jeevan Bhar Ka" (part 2)	Sapan–Jagmohan	M. G. Hashmat	Suresh Wadkar
Swarthi	"Sheeshe Ki Hoon Main"	Sapan–Jagmohan	M. G. Hashmat	solo
Swarthi	"Tawaif Naam Hai Mera"	Sapan–Jagmohan	Dilip Tahir	solo
Swati	"Shaadi Mubarak"	Laxmikant–Pyarelal	Anand Bakshi	Alka Yagnik
Tahkhana	"Nazron Se Aaj Nazren Aur Dil Se Dil Milayen"	Ajit Singh	Kafil Azar	Poornima
Tan-Badan	"Gale Lag Jaa"	Anand–Milind	Sameer	Suresh Wadkar
Teesra Kinara	"Diya Toh Jale"	Shyam Sagar	Anjaan	solo
Vikram Vetal	"Hey Ambe Maa, Teri Bigdi Bana De"	Nadeem–Shravan	Indeevar	solo
Vikram Vetal	"Prem Ekta Navjeevan Ka, Laaye Tum Sandesh"	Nadeem–Shravan	Indeevar	solo
Vikram Vetal	"Hoke Deewani, Naache Jawaani"	Nadeem–Shravan	Indeevar	Alka Yagnik
Vikram Vetal	"Tumse Hi Hona Tha Pyaar"	Nadeem–Shravan	Indeevar	Amit Kumar

==== 1987 ====
Film	Song	Composer(s)	Writer(s)	Co-artist(s)
Dilruba Tangewali	"Khule Aam Kehte Hain Aaj, Humne Pee Hai"	Laxmikant–Pyarelal	Farooq Kaiser	Mohammed Aziz, Lata Mangeshkar
Dilruba Tangewali	"Taaron Bhari Thi Raat"	Laxmikant–Pyarelal	Farooq Kaiser	solo
Apna Jahan	"Tere Mere Sapne Saare Khoye Hain"	Anu Malik	Amit Khanna	solo
Apna Jahan	"Tere Mere Sapne Saare Khoye Hain" (sad)	Anu Malik	Amit Khanna	solo
Apne Apne Sanskar	"Hum Tere Kunwarepan Ki"	Rajla Sharma	K. R. Gupta	Mohammed Aziz
Apne Apne Sanskar	"Chhod Ke Mujhko Veerane Mein"	Rajla Sharma	K. R. Gupta	solo
Besahara	"Saajan Teri Bahon Mein"	Usha Khanna	Gauhar Kanpuri	solo
Bijlee Aur Toofan	"Main Toh Ho Gaya Deewana"	Anwar–Usman	Khalid	Suresh Wadkar
Bijlee Aur Toofan	"Sapere Bin Baja"	Anwar–Usman	Khalid	solo
Dadagiri	"Gudiya Rani Hai Tu"	Anu Malik	Hasrat Jaipuri	Munmi Borah
Dadagiri	"Sirf Khiladi Badal Gaya"	Anu Malik	Hasrat Jaipuri	solo
Dilruba Tangewali	"Main Balam Wohi Lungi"	Anwar–Usman	Khalid	Suresh Wadkar
Dilruba Tangewali	"Aaj Mit Jaayenge"	Anwar–Usman	Khalid	Mohammed Aziz
Dozakh	"Khamoshi Jab Hadh Se Badhi"	Ganesh	Mahendra Dalvi	Suresh Wadkar
Ghar Ka Sukh	"Huzoor Aap Yeh Tohfa Qubool Kar Lije"	Ravi	Ravi	Anwar
Ghar Ka Sukh	"Bol Ro Jethani"	Ravi	Ravi	Alka Yagnik
Hifazat	"Ram Ki Baatein Ram Hi Jaane"	R D Burman	Anand Bakshi	Mohammed Aziz
Inaam Dus Hazaar	"Kabhi Yeh Haath Hai"	R D Burman	Majrooh Sultanpuri	solo
Insaaf	"Nand Ka Lala Nand Gopal"	Laxmikant–Pyarelal	Farooq Kaiser	solo
Insaaf	"Sulagti Hain Aankhen" (sad)	Laxmikant–Pyarelal	Farooq Kaiser	solo
Insaaf	"Humsafar Milti Hai Manzil, Thokare Khane Ke Baad"	Laxmikant–Pyarelal	Farooq Kaiser	solo
Insaaf	"Sulgati Hai Aankhen" (duet)	Laxmikant–Pyarelal	Farooq Kaiser	Mohammed Aziz
Insaf Ki Pukar	"Tune Jaga Diya"	Laxmikant–Pyarelal	Anand Bakshi	Mohammed Aziz
Insaf Ki Pukar	"Toota Yeh Dil Ka Sheesha"	Laxmikant–Pyarelal	Anand Bakshi	solo
Jaago Hua Savera	"Dekh Patli Kamariya Machal Gayo Saiyan"	Sonik–Omi	Naqsh Lyallpuri	solo
Jaan Hatheli Pe	"Sai Naam Sumiran Jo Bhi Kare"	Laxmikant–Pyarelal	Anjaan	Anup Jalota
Jaan Hatheli Pe	"Jaan Hatheli Pe Leke Aaya Tera Deewana"	Laxmikant–Pyarelal	Anjaan	Shabbir Kumar
Jawaab Hum Denge	"Hairaan Hoon Main, Aap Ki Zulfon Ko Dekh Kar"	Laxmikant–Pyarelal	S. H. Bihari	Shabbir Kumar
Jawaab Hum Denge	"Jab Jab Miyan Bibi Mein Takraar Hoti Hai"	Laxmikant–Pyarelal	Sameer	Mohammed Aziz
Jeete Hain Shaan Se	"Rab Roothe Roothe"	Anu Malik	Indeevar	Shabbir Kumar, Anu Malik
Jeete Hain Shaan Se	"Jeete Hain Shaan Se"	Anu Malik	Indeevar	Amit Kumar, Kavita Krishnamurthy, Shabbir Kumar, Shailendra Singh
Jhuke Jhuke Naina	"Kanha Re, Kanha Re"	Anup Jalota	Maya Govind	Anup Jalota
Jhuke Jhuke Naina	Champa Kali Ko Phool Bana De"	Anup Jalota	Hasrat Jaipuri	solo
Kachchi Kali	"Andhiyan Aisi Chali, Har Khwab Mera Bikhar Gaya"	Usha Khanna	Yogesh	solo
Kamagni	"Jiske Sahare Rangeen Nazare"	Ilaiyaraaja	Indeevar	Suresh Wadkar
Khooni Mahal	"Jalta Hai Tan, Machalta Hain Man"	Nadeem–Shravan	Anwar Sagar, Anil Pandit	Vinod Rathod
Khooni Mahal	"Maine Dil Tujhko Diya"	Nadeem–Shravan	Anwar Sagar, Anil Pandit	Mohammed Aziz
Kissan	"Phoolon Ki Baharon Ne"	Manjeet Arora	Soz Layalpuri	Shabbir Kumar
Kudrat Ka Kanoon	"Abhi Toh Padi Hai Umar Yeh Saari"	Laxmikant–Pyarelal	Sameer	solo
Loha	"Teri Hasti Hai Kya Jo Mitayega"	Laxmikant–Pyarelal	Farooq Kaiser	Kavita Krishnamurthy, Shabbir Kumar
Loha	"Patli Kamar Lambe Baal"	Laxmikant–Pyarelal	Farooq Kaiser	Kavita Krishnamurthy
Loha	"Saat Taalon Mein Rakh, Saat Pardo Mein Rakh"	Laxmikant–Pyarelal	Farooq Kaiser	Kavita Krishnamurthy
Maashuka	"Yun khud Ko Na Mitao"	R. K. Arun	R. K. Arun	solo
Maashuka	"Kayi Sadiyon Se Hota"	R. K. Arun	Shardanand Tiwari	Manhar Udhas
Manav Hatya	"Alaap"	Anu Malik	Rajendra Krishan	solo
Manav Hatya	"Pyaar Mein Jitne Shartein Hai"	Anu Malik	Rajendra Krishan	Mohammed Aziz
Manu The Great	"Baharon Ne Khushiyon Ke Phool Barsaye"	Ravi	Ravi	Amit Kumar
Marte Dam Tak	"Chhodenge Na Hun Tera Saath"	Ravindra Jain	Ravindra Jain	Mohammed Aziz
Mera Karam Mera Dharam	"Janani Jagat Ki"	Laxmikant–Pyarelal	Anand Bakshi	solo
Mr. India	"Parody Song"	Laxmikant–Pyarelal	Javed Akhtar	Shabbir Kumar
Nafrat	"Pyaar Sikha Doon"	Surinder Kohli	Asad Bhopali	Shailendra Singh
Nafrat	"Main Toh Nachoongi"	Surinder Kohli	Asad Bhopali	Shabbir Kumar
Nazrana	"Keh De Zamane Se"	Laxmikant–Pyarelal	Anand Bakshi	Mohammed Aziz
Parivar	"Tu Naache, Main Gaoon"	Laxmikant–Pyarelal	Anand Bakshi	Suresh Wadkar
Pyar Ke Do Chaar Din	"Ku Ku Koyal Bole"	G. S. Mangat	G. S. Mangat	Suresh Wadkar
Pyar Ke Do Chaar Din	"Jab Se Mere Dil Mein Aan Base"	G. S. Mangat	G. S. Mangat	solo
Pyar Ke Do Chaar Din	"Doston Ne Dosti Mein"	G. S. Mangat	G. S. Mangat	solo
Raat Ke Baad	"Mera Husn Hai Chikna Chikna"	Kalyanji–Anandji	Verma Malik	solo
Sansar	"Radha Rani Na Jaiyo Ri"	Laxmikant–Pyarelal	Anand Bakshi	solo
Sansar	"So Jaa, So Jaa"	Laxmikant–Pyarelal	Anand Bakshi	solo
Shuruaat	"Baadal Ki Baahon Mein"	Laxmikant–Pyarelal	Ram Bhardwaj	Manhar Udhas
Shuruaat	"Tere Bin Chain Na Aaye"	Laxmikant–Pyarelal	Hasrat Jaipuri	Mohammed Aziz
Shuruaat	"Ban Ke Bhi Mere Ban Na Sake"	Laxmikant–Pyarelal	Hasrat Jaipuri	solo
Shuruaat	"Tumhi Par Mite The, Tumhi Par Mitenge"	Laxmikant–Pyarelal	Hasrat Jaipuri	Shabbir Kumar
Superman	"Kankari Jhade Paaon Meib"	Kamal Kant	Asad Bhopali, Naseem Saharanbadi, Kulwant Jani	solo
Superman	"Maine Maana Tumhi Ho"	Kamal Kant		solo
Sutradhar	"Yeh Sutradhar Kaun Hai"	Sudheer Moghe	Sudheer Moghe	solo
Tera Karam Mera Dharam	"Aankhon Mein Aankhen Kho Jaane Do"	Sonik–Omi	Indeevar	Manhar Udhas
Uddhaar	"Sauda Hota Nahin Pyaar Mein" (female)	Laxmikant–Pyarelal	Neeraj, Shree Mohan Pradeep	solo
Uddhaar	"Mere Humraah"	Laxmikant–Pyarelal	Neeraj, Shree Mohan Pradeep	Anwar
Uttar Dakshin	"Keh Do Yttar Walon Se"	Laxmikant–Pyarelal	Anand Bakshi	Mohammed Aziz, Manhar Udhas
Uttar Dakshin	"Laila Mar Gayi"	Laxmikant–Pyarelal	Anand Bakshi	solo
Waqt Ka Shahenshah (Dubbed version)	"Saathiya Aaj Lo Jaam Dil Ka"	Vinod Rathod	Yogesh	Vinod Rathod
Waqt Ka Shahenshah (Dubbed version)	"Pakdo Mujhe, Are Pakdo"	Vinod Rathod	Yogesh	Vinod Rathod
Waqt Ka Shahenshah (Dubbed version)	"Aye Ji, Kuchh Bolo"	Vinod Rathod	Yogesh	Vinod Rathod
Watan Ke Rakhwale	"Jab Bhi Kiya Iqraar Kiya"	Laxmikant–Pyarelal	Majrooh Sultanpuri	Mohammed Aziz
Watan Ke Rakhwale	"Maata Bhi Tu, Pita Bhi Tu"	Laxmikant–Pyarelal	Majrooh Sultanpuri	Mohammed Aziz

==== 1988 ====
Film	Song	Composer(s)	Writer(s)	Co-artist(s)
7 Bijliyaan	"Tak Dhum Dhum"	Usha Khanna	Yogesh	solo
Aag Ke Sholay	"Baharo Me Dhumtara Nazaro Me Dhumtara"	Vijay	Khalid	Amit Kumar
Aag Ke Sholay	"Kandhe Se Milake Kandha Kare Bhlayi Ka Dhandha"	Vijay	Khalid	Alka Yagnik
Akhri Adaalat	"Tu Maseeha, Tu Mohabbat"	Anu Malik	Anjaan	Mohammed Aziz
Biwi Ho To Aisi	"Phool Gulaab Ka"	Laxmikant–Pyarelal	Sameer	Mohammad Aziz
Biwi Ho To Aisi	"Saasu Ji Tune Meri Kadar Na Jaani"	Laxmikant–Pyarelal	Sameer	solo
Biwi Ho To Aisi	"Sancha Tera Naam"	Laxmikant–Pyarelal	Sameer	solo
Dayavan	"Aaj Phir Tum Pe, Pyaar Aaya Hai"	Laxmikant–Pyarelal	Aziz Qaisi	Pankaj Udhas
Dukh-Dard	"Itni Saadgi Itni Dilkashi"	Alok Ganguly	Gauhar Kanpuri	Mohammed Aziz
Dukh-Dard	"Suno Sanam, Kaho Sanam"	Alok Ganguly	Gauhar Kanpuri	Mohammed Aziz
Ek Hi Maqsad	"Deewaron Se Mil Kar Rona Achchha Lagta Hai"	Pankaj Udhas	Mumtaz Rashid	solo
Ganga Tere Desh Mein	"Tera Mera Saath"	Laxmikant–Pyarelal	Anand Bakshi	Mohammed Aziz
Ganga Tere Desh Mein	"Vadha Hai Vadha Hai"	Laxmikant–Pyarelal	Anand Bakshi	solo
Ganga Tere Desh Mein	"Tip Tip Tip Boond Padi"	Laxmikant–Pyarelal	Anand Bakshi	solo
Geeta Ki Saugand	"Pee Kar Pyaala Bhang"	Anwar–Usman	Mahendra Dalvi	Suresh Wadkar
Ghar Akhir Ghar Hai	"Aji Pure Ho Gaye Sapne"	Roshan Lal	B. S. Mahalwal	Raj Kumar
Ghar Akhir Ghar Hai	"Are Pakdo Pakdo"	Roshan Lal	B. S. Mahalwal	solo
Ghar Mein Ram Gali Mein Shyam	"Duhaai Hai Duhaai"	Amar–Utpal	Anjaan	Mohammed Aziz
Gharwali Baharwali	"Yeh Kya Bekaraari Ki, Main Hoon Tumhari"	Swami Ameet	Alauddin Naveed	Suresh Wadkar
Gharwali Baharwali	"Pyaar Ka Taraana Liye, Dil Ka Fasana Liye"	Swami Ameet	Sajeed Azam	Suresh Wadkar
[Hamara Khandan	"Tum Sochti Ho Shaayad"	Laxmikant–Pyarelal	Farooq Kaiser	Mohammed Aziz
[Hamara Khandan	"Mere Mehboob Ruk Jaao"	Laxmikant–Pyarelal	Farooq Kaiser	Mohammed Aziz
Idd Mubarak	"Likh Di Maine Aaj Ki Shaam"	Kamal Rajasthani	Ramrikh Manhar	Arshi Hyderabadi
Idd Mubarak	"Aastan Pe Ab Kisi Ne"	Kamal Rajasthani	Jeet Jaipuri	Anwar, Pushpa Pagdhare, Dilraj Kaur, Radha Saluja, Mandheer Pandit
Idd Mubarak	"Jahan Tere Kadmon Ke Nishaan Ban Gaye"	Kamal Rajasthani	Poojashri	Alok Varma
Idd Mubarak	"Madinewale Suniye Meri Fariyad"	Kamal Rajasthani	Ramesh Malhotra	Sulakshana Pandit
Inteqam	"Ab Main Naachoongi"	Laxmikant–Pyarelal	Anand Bakshi	solo
Inteqam	"Main Jawaan Ho Gayee"	Laxmikant–Pyarelal	Anand Bakshi	Mohammed Aziz
Jai Karoli Maa	"Jai Karoli Wali Devi"	Ravindra Jain	Ravindra Jain	Mahendra Kapoor, Hemlata
Jai Karoli Maa	"Haye Ri Vidaai"	Ravindra Jain	Ravindra Jain	
Janam Janam	"Aaja Aaja Sanam Janam Janam Ku Pyasi Ankhiyan" (part 1)	Laxmikant–Pyarelal	S. H. Bihari	solo
Janam Janam	"Aaja Aaj Sanam Janam Janam Ki Pyasi Ankhiyan "	Laxmikant–Pyarelal	S. H. Bihari	solo
Janam Janam	"Barkha Rut Bhi Aaj Ajeeb Mastani Hai"	Laxmikant–Pyarelal	Majrooh Sultanpuri	Mohammed Aziz
Jeete Hain Shaan Se	"Johnny Ka Bhai Iqbal"	Anu Malik	Indeevar	Amit Kumar, Shailendra Singh, Kavita Krishnamurthy, Shabbir Kumar
Jeete Hain Shaan Se	"Ab Roothe Toh Roothe Yeh Saara Zamaana"	Anu Malik	Indeevar	Anu Malik, Shabbir Kumar
Kaal Chakra	"Tu Bhi Jaage Raat"	Vijay Batalvi	Trilok Singh Komal	Mahendra Kapoor, Vijay Batalvi
Kaal Chakra	"Tu Bhi Jaage raat" (sad)	Vijay Batalvi	Trilok Singh Komal	sol
Kaal Chakra	"Duniya Jalaati Hai Jo Dil Toh Kya"	Vijay Batalvi	Indeevar	Manhar Udhas
Kanoon Ki Hathkadi'	"Arjun Arjun Aa Zara"	Usha Khanna	Yogesh	solo
Kanoon Ki Hathkadi'	"Pyari Hai Jaan Se Pyari Tu Behna"	Usha Khanna	Yogesh	Vinod Rathod
Kanoon Ki Hathkadi'	"Kehti Hai Maina, Mast Rehna"	Usha Khanna	Yogesh	Vijay Benedict
Khatarnak Iraade	"Ek Din Tumhen Paayenge"	Kirti–Anuraag	Ram Siddharth	solo
Khatron Ke Khiladi	"Tumse Bana Mera Jeevan, Sundar Sapan Salona" (Happy)	Laxmikant–Pyarelal	Anand Bakshi	Mohammed Aziz
Khatron Ke Khiladi	"Tumse Bana Mera Jeevan, Sundar Sapan Salona" (Sad)	Laxmikant–Pyarelal	Anand Bakshi	Mohammed Aziz
Khatron Ke Khiladi	"Teri Meri Pyar Bhari Baaton Mein"	Laxmikant–Pyarelal	Anand Bakshi	Mohammed Aziz
Khatron Ke Khiladi	"Hip Hip Hurray, Premyion Ke Dil Panchhi Bankar Ude"	Laxmikant–Pyarelal	Anand Bakshi	Amit Kumar, Mohammed Aziz, Kavita Krishnamurthy
Mar Mitenge	"Dekho Mera Janaaza Nikla"	Laxmikant–Pyarelal	Anand Bakshi	Kishore Kumar
Mar Mitenge	"Badon Ka Hai Farmana, Kisi Se Dil Na Lagaana"	Laxmikant–Pyarelal	Anand Bakshi	Kavita Krishnamurthy, Mohammed Aziz, Shailendra Singh
Mardon Mein Mard	"Ik Nasha Sharab Ka"	Amar–Utpal	Abhilash	solo
Naa-Mumkin	"Ae Zindagi Kya Hai Tera Khel"	R D Burman	Anjaan	solo
Naa-Mumkin	"Ae Zindagi Huyi Kahan Bhool"	R D Burman	Anjaan	solo
Nagin Aur Nagina	"Jo Dushman Hai Tera"	Jeetu–Tapan	Naqsh Lyallpuri	solo
Nagin Aur Nagina	"Aa Mil Jaa Gale"	Jeetu–Tapan	Naqsh Lyallpuri	Shabbir Kumar
Naya Khoon	"Meethi Woh Murli Lhir Se Bajaana"	Usha Khanna	Indeevar	Bhupinder Singh
Naya Khoon	"Hum Jisse Lipat Kar Ro Lete"	Usha Khanna	Indeevar	Suresh Wadkar
Naya Khoon	"Main Garib Dilwala Hoon"	Usha Khanna	Indeevar	Kishore Kumar
Naya Khoon	"Dard Sabhi Ka Ek Hi Jaisa"	Usha Khanna	Indeevar	Kishore Kumar
Paanch Fauladi	"Koi Kahe Jani Mujhe"	Uttam–Jagdish	Nida Fazli	Kavita Krishnamurthy
Paap Ko Jala Kar Raakh Kar Doonga	"Jeevan Sukh Dukh Ka Ek Sangam Hai" (version 1)	Ravindra Jain	Ravindra Jain	Kishore Kumar
Paap Ko Jala Kar Raakh Kar Doonga	"Jeevan Sukh Dukh Ka Ek Sangam Hai" (version 4)	Ravindra Jain	Ravindra Jain	Kishore Kumar
Paap Ko Jala Kar Raakh Kar Doonga	"Kya Tareef Karoon"	Ravindra Jain	Ravindra Jain	Suresh Wadkar
Paap Ko Jala Kar Raakh Kar Doonga	"Rani Kahe, Gudiya Kahe"	Ravindra Jain	Ravindra Jain	Mohammed Aziz
Paap Ko Jala Kar Raakh Kar Doonga	"Sathiya O Sathiya"	Ravindra Jain	Ravindra Jain	Mohammed Aziz
Padosi Ki Biwi	"Tumhein Jamghata Aashiqon Ka"	Usha Khanna	Hasrat Jaipuri	Anwar
Pati Paisa Aur Pyar	"Kehta Hai Man, Ban Je Bhawan"	Vijay Batalvi	Sagar Dutt, Rajendra	Manhar Udhas, Dilraj Kaur
Pati Paisa Aur Pyar	"Jab Tak Tujhko Dekh Ja Loon"	Vijay Batalvi	Sagar Dutt, Rajendra	Manhar Udhas
Pati Paisa Aur Pyar	"Ansuon Se Bhara"	Vijay Batalvi	Sagar Dutt, Rajendra	solo
Ram-Avtar	"Na Na Karte"	Laxmikant–Pyarelal	Anand Bakshi	Mohammad Aziz, Udit Narayan
Ram-Avtar	"Nigore Mardon Ka"	Laxmikant–Pyarelal	Anand Bakshi	solo
Sherni	"Ek Rupaiya Doge"	Kalyanji–Anandji	Verma Malik	solo
Shiv Ganga	"Bhakti Nahin Hai Mujh Mein"	Chitragupt	Pandit Madhur	solo
Shiv Ganga	"Kya Dil Mein Ho Raha Hai"	Chitragupt	Pandit Madhur	Suresh Wadkar
Shiv Ganga	"Mere Jeevan Mein Tujhse Bahaar Sajni"	Chitragupt	Sameer	Suresh Wadkar
Shoorveer	"Haye Kya Poochhti Ho, Dard Kidhar Hoti Hai"	Laxmikant–Pyarelal	S. H. Bihari	solo
Shoorveer	"Awaaz Isi Waadi Mein Rahegi" (female)	Laxmikant–Pyarelal	S. H. Bihari	Kavita Krishnamurthy
Shoorveer	"Ha Aayi Aayi Re Dulhaniya"	Laxmikant–Pyarelal	S. H. Bihari	Suresh Wadkar
Shukriyaa	"Barsaat Ki Boonda Boondi"	Anu Malik	Shaily Shailendra	Shabbir Kumar
Shukriyaa	"Hangarena Tangarena"	Anu Malik	Verma Malik	Suresh Wadkar
Tezaab	"Tumko Hum Dilbar Kyun Naane"	Laxmikant–Pyarelal	Javed Akhtar	Sudesh Bhosle
Tezaab	"Keh Do Ke Tum"	Laxmikant–Pyarelal	Javed Akhtar	Amit Kumar
Tohfa Mohabbat Ka	"Pyaar Se Pyara Kuchh Bhi Nahin"	Anup Jalota	Maya Govind	Anup Jalota
Woh Phir Aayegi	"Main Gaaoon Tere Liye"	Anand–Milind	Sameer	Amit Kumar
Woh Phir Aayegi	"Bol Sakhi Bol Sakhi"	Anand–Milind	Sameer	Amit Kumar
Woh Phir Aayegi	"Woh Phir Aayegi"	Anand–Milind	Sameer	solo
Yeh Pyaar Nahin	"Mujhe Aap Sa Pyaar Mil Gaya"	S. Madan	Kulwant Jani	solo
Zakhmi Aurat	"Pyaar Mila Sab Kuchh Mila"	Bappi Lahiri	Farooq Kaiser	Mohammed Aziz
Zalzala	"Holi Ayee Re"	R D Burman	Gulshan Bawra	Shailendra Singh, Sudesh Bhosle

==== 1989 ====
Film	Song	Composer(s)	Writer(s)	Co-artist(s)
Abhi Toh Main Jawaan Hoon	"Jaane Kahan Kab De Jaaye Dhokha"	Anand–Milind	Sameer	Mohammed Aziz
Ajnabi Aaaya	"Maine Dil Tujhko Diya"	Ghulam Ali Chander	Mithilesh Sinha	Mohammed Aziz
Ajnabi Aaaya	"Ab Toh Aaja Saathi Mere" (version 1)	Ghulam Ali Chander	Mithilesh Sinha	solo
Ajnabi Aaaya	"Ab Toh Aaja Saathi Mere" (version 2)	Ghulam Ali Chander	Mithilesh Sinha	solo
Apna Desh Paraye Log	"Mishri Ka Dali Hai Roop Tera"	Usha Khanna	Armaan Shahabi	Udit Narayan
Awara Zindagi	"Aayi Sawan Ki Rut Matwali"	Jagdish J.	Hasan Kamal, Aziz Mirzapuri, Anwar Mirzapuri, Tajdar Taj, Ahmed Wasi	solo
Bade Ghar Ki Beti	"Bade Ghar Ki Beti Ke Nakhre Bade"	Laxmikant–Pyarelal	Santosh Anand	Suresh Wadkar, Kavita Krishnamurthy
Bade Ghar Ki Beti	"Teri Paayal Baji Jahan, Main Paagal Hua Wahaan"	Laxmikant–Pyarelal	Santosh Anand	Mohammed Aziz
Bandook Dahej Ke Seenay Par	"Yaar Ki Gali Mein"	Jugal Kishore–Tilak Raj	Ram Gopal Gupta	Shabbir Kumar, Shailendra Singh
Batwara	"Thare Vaste Re Dhola"	Laxmikant–Pyarelal	Hasan Kamal	Alka Yagnik, Kavita Krishnamurthy
Batwara	"Jo Main Aisa Jaanti Preet Kiye Dukh Hoyi"	Laxmikant–Pyarelal	Hasan Kamal	Kavita Krishnamurthy
Bees Saal Baad	"Hum Tumhein Itna Pyar Karenge"	Laxmikant–Pyarelal	Anand Bakshi	Mohammed Aziz
Bees Saal Baad	"O Baliye Ni Chal Chaliye"	Laxmikant–Pyarelal	Anand Bakshi	Mohammed Aziz
Bees Saal Baad	"Jaago Jaago Devi Mata"	Laxmikant–Pyarelal	Anand Bakshi	solo
Bees Saal Baad	"Kitne Sawan Baras Gaye" (version 1)	Laxmikant–Pyarelal	Anand Bakshi	solo
Bees Saal Baad	"Kitne Sawan Baras Gaye" (version 2)	Laxmikant–Pyarelal	Anand Bakshi	solo
Bhrashtachar	"Tere Naina Mere Naino Se"	Laxmikant–Pyarelal	Anand Bakshi	Suresh Wadkar
Chahe Mita Do	"Gaana Bole Toh"	Uday Mazumdar	A. Chakraborty, Syed Rahi	Suresh Wadkar
Chahe Mita Do	"Main aayi, Aa Gayi"	Uday Mazumdar	A. Chakraborty, Syed Rahi	Suresh Wadkar
Do Qaidi	"Aa Rab Se Dua Maangen"	Laxmikant–Pyarelal	Kulwant Jani	Kavita Krishnamurthy, Suresh Wadkar, Mohammed Aziz
Doorie	"Kais ahIa Pyara Ghar"	Kuldeep Singh	Rahmani, Zafar Gorakhpuri	solo
Doorie	"Chali Kuthe Pori"	Kuldeep Singh	Rahmani, Zafar Gorakhpuri	Mahendra Kapoor
Elaan-E-Jung	"Tik Tik Chalti Hai"	Laxmikant–Pyarelal	Anand Bakshi	solo
Gawaahi	"Bhool Bhulaiyya Sa Yeh Jeevan"	Uttam-Jagdish	Sardar Anjum	Pankaj Udhas
Gawaahi	"Dekh Ke Tumko"	Uttam-Jagdish	Sardar Anjum	Pankaj Udhas
Gawaahi	"Dil Ki Baatein Hain"	Uttam-Jagdish	Sardar Anjum	Pankaj Udhas
Gawaahi	"Khat Mein Likha Hai"	Uttam-Jagdish	Sardar Anjum	solo
Gharana	"Dhak Dhak"	Laxmikant–Pyarelal	Anand Bakshi	Mohammed Aziz
Gharana	"Khushi Ka Hai Mauqa"	Laxmikant–Pyarelal	Anand Bakshi	solo
Hathyar	"Oye Qurban, Oye Qurban"	Laxmikant–Pyarelal	Hasan Kamal	Shailendra Singh
Hum Bhi Insaan Hain	"Sun Le O Daata"	Bappi Lahiri	Indeevar	Udit Narayan
Izhaar	"Kaise Yeh Rishte Anjaane" (version 1)	Kalyanji–Anandji	Nida Fazli	solo
Izhaar	"Kaise Yeh Rishte Anjaane" (version 2)	Kalyanji–Anandji	Nida Fazli	solo
Jaaydaad	"Tu Hi Meri Anakhen"	Anu Malik	Nida Fazli	solo
Jaaydaad	"Tu Hi Meri Aankhen" (sad)	Anu Malik	Nida Fazli	solo
Jailkhana	"Raah Par Unko Le Aaye Hain"	Ravindra Jain	Ravindra Jain	Suresh Wadkar
Jawani Ka Dushman	"Main Hoon Mastani Chikni"	Sonik–Omi	B. R. Tripathi	solo
Jawani Ka Dushman	"Kiss Me, Kiss Me, O Babu"	Sonik–Omi	B. R. Tripathi	solo
Jawani Ka Dushman	"Aa Baahon Mein Aaja"	Sonik–Omi	B. R. Tripathi	Suresh Wadkar
Kasam Suhaag Ki	"Aa Gale Lag Jaa" (version 1)	Laxmikant–Pyarelal	Hasan Kamal	solo
Kasam Suhaag Ki	"Aa Gale Lag Jaa" (version 2)	Laxmikant–Pyarelal	Hasan Kamal	solo
Kasam Suhaag Ki	"Main Na Boliya Chiraiya Ko Baaz Liye Jaye"	Laxmikant–Pyarelal	S. H. Bihari	solo
Khuli Khidki	"Soniya Mera Naam Hai"	Usha Khanna	Kulwant Jani, Yogesh	solo
Khuli Khidki	"Door Door Kyun Hai"	Usha Khanna	Kulwant Jani, Yogesh	solo
Khuli Khidki	"Chalo Chalen, Kahan Chalen"	Usha Khanna	Kulwant Jani, Yogesh	Vinod Rathod
Lahu Ki Awaaz	"Jaane Anjaane Mein Huyi Jo Bhool"	Usha Khanna	Anjaan	solo
Lal Dupatta Malmal Ka	"Kya Batlayen Janejaan"	Anand–Milind	Majrooh Sultanpuri	Udit Narayan
Lal Dupatta Malmal Ka	"Na Jane Kyon Main Bekaraar"	Anand–Milind	Majrooh Sultanpuri	Udit Narayan
Lal Dupatta Malmal Ka	"Suni Suni Ankhiyon Mein"	Anand–Milind	Majrooh Sultanpuri	Suresh Wadkar
Lal Dupatta Malmal Ka	"Raqeebon Se Habibon Se"	Anand–Milind	Majrooh Sultanpuri	Suresh Wadkar
Lal Dupatta Malmal Ka	"Main Gul Hoon Kali Hoon"	Anand–Milind	Majrooh Sultanpuri	Mohammad Aziz
Lal Dupatta Malmal Ka	"Ab Dawa Ki Jaroorat Nahin"	Anand–Milind	Majrooh Sultanpuri	Mohammad Aziz
Lal Dupatta Malmal Ka	"Tumne Rakh To Lee Tasveer Hamari"	Anand–Milind	Majrooh Sultanpuri	Pankaj Udhas
Lal Dupatta Malmal Ka	"Kuch Baat Hai Tum Mein Jo"	Anand–Milind	Majrooh Sultanpuri	Pankaj Udhas
Mahaadev	"Mujhe Baahon Mein Bhar Ke Dekh Le"	Ilaiyaraaja	Gulshan Bawra	S. P. Balasubrahmanyam
Main Tera Dushman	"Jinhe Chahiye Daulat Rabba"	Laxmikant–Pyarelal	Indeevar	Shabbir Kumar
Main Tera Dushman	"Baje Mera Bichhua"	Laxmikant–Pyarelal	Indeevar	Udit Narayan
Meri Lalkaar	"Dushman Ban Ke Aaj Main Teri"	Vijay Batalvi	Sanam Gazipuri	solo
Meri Zabaan	"Zindagi Pyaar Ka Ik Nayi Geet Hai" (solo	Anu Malik	Anjaan	solo
Meri Zabaan	"Zindagi Pyaar Ka Ik Nayi Geet Hai" (duet)	Anu Malik	Anjaan	Mohammed Aziz
Mohabbat Ki Hai Humne	"Kaash Aankhon Ka"	Usha Khanna	Naqsh Lyallpuri	solo
Naag Nagin	"Bhagwan Tujhe Aana Hi Padega"	Laxmikant–Pyarelal	Santosh Anand	solo
Naag Nagin	"Mere Pyaar Nere Zindagi"	Laxmikant–Pyarelal	Santosh Anand	Shabbir Kumar
Nigahen	"Kise Dhoondhta Hai Pagal Sapere"	Laxmikant–Pyarelal	Anand Bakshi	solo
Nigahen	"Dil Se Bikal Kar Dil Kho Gayi Hai"	Laxmikant–Pyarelal	Anand Bakshi	Suresh Wadkar
Nishanebaaz	"Hum Toh Banjaare Hai"	Ravindra Jain	Ravindra Jain	Suresh Wadkar
Parayaa Ghar	"Saajan Se Milne Jaana Hai Aaj"	Laxmikant–Pyarelal	Hasan Kamal	solo
Parayaa Ghar	"Hum Se Kiya Tha Tune Jhootha Wada"	Laxmikant–Pyarelal	Hasan Kamal	solo
Parayaa Ghar	"Dulhan Tujhe Banaoonga"	Laxmikant–Pyarelal	Hasan Kamal	Suresh Wadkar
Purani Haveli	"Kaise Main Bhulaoon Tera Pyaar"	Ajit Singh	Asha Rani	solo
Rakhwala	"Aag Lag Rahi Hai"	Anand–Milind	Sameer	Mohammed Aziz
Ram Lakhan	"My Name Is Lakhan"	Laxmikant–Pyarelal	Anand Bakshi	Mohammed Aziz, Nitin Mukesh
Ram Lakhan	"Tera Naam Liya, Tujhe Yaad Kiya"	Laxmikant–Pyarelal	Anand Bakshi	Manhar Udhas
Ram Lakhan	"Bekhabar Bewafa"	Laxmikant–Pyarelal	Anand Bakshi	solo
Sau Saal Baad	"Aa Re Aa Bhi Jaa Re"	Anu Malik	Anjaan, Mahendra Dalvi	solo
Shagun	"Kuchhu Suddh Nahi"	Jaidev	Sayeed Quadri	Sheila Gulwadi
Shehzaade	"Main Hoon Tere Naam Ki Chitthi"	Laxmikant–Pyarelal	Anand Bakshi	solo
Shehzaade	"Mere Munne Tujhko Ye Kissa" (part 1)	Laxmikant–Pyarelal	Anand Bakshi	solo
Shehzaade	"Mere Munne Tujhko Ye Kissa" (part 2)	Laxmikant–Pyarelal	Anand Bakshi	solo
Sindoor Aur Bandook	"Teri Bandook Hai Soutem Meri"	Ajay Swami	Yogesh, Gauhar Kanpuri	solo
Socha Naa Tha	"Sach Hai Jo Kuchh"	N/A	N/A	solo
Suryaa	"Maine Tujhse Pyaar Kiya Hai"	Laxmikant–Pyarelal	Santosh Anand	Mohammed Aziz
Taaqatwar	"Dhak Dhak Karti Hai Mera Chhatiyan"	Anu Malik	Indeevar, Sameer	solo
Time Limit	"Barso Re, Barso Re"	R D Burman	Sameer	Shailendra Singh
Toofan	"Haan Bhai Haan Main Hoon Jawaan"	Anu Malik	Indeevar	Amit Kumar
Tu Nagin Main Sapera	"O Pardesi Rang Jama"	Anwar–Usman	Mahendra Dalvi	solo
Tu Nagin Main Sapera	"O Sapere Mere Dushman"	Anwar–Usman	Mahendra Dalvi	solo
Tujhe Nahin Chhodunga	"Aaj Saqi Tere Maikade Mein"	C. P. Bhati	Hasan Kamal	Amit Kumar, Mohammed Aziz, Alka Yagnik
Ustad	"Aankhon Mein Kaajal"	Usha Khanna	Indeevar	Mohammed Aziz
Waasta	"Apni Banni Jahan Se Nirala Hai"	Ajit Varman	Abhilash	solo
Wohi Bhayanak Raat	"Bolo Om Namah Shivaay"	Surinder Kohli	Narendra Roshan	Rohan Kapoor

=== 1990s ===
==== 1990 ====
Film	Song	Composer(s)	Writer(s)	Co-artist(s)
Aag Ka Dariya	"Rishta Yeh Mohabbat Ka"	Laxmikant–Pyarelal	Rajendra Krishan	solo
Aaj Ke Shahenshah	"Hum Dono Akele Ho"	Bappi Lahiri	Anjaan	Bappi Lahiri
Aaj Ke Shahenshah	"Mohabbat Kitne Rang Badalti Hain"	Bappi Lahiri	Anjaan	solo
Aakash Ganga	"Tohra Yeh Jhumka" (version 1)	Alok Ganguly	Yogesh	solo
Aakash Ganga	"Tohra Yeh Jhumka" (version 2)	Alok Ganguly	Yogesh	solo
Aakash Ganga	"Lagta Hai Yeh Tere Mere"	Alok Ganguly	Yogesh	Mohammed Aziz
Aakash Ganga	"De Ke Mujhe Har Khushi"	Alok Ganguly	Aayaz Jhansi	
Aandhiyan	"Duniya Mein Tere Siva"	Bappi Lahiri	Anjaan	Udit Narayan
Aandhiyan	"Ole Ole"	Bappi Lahiri	Anjaan	Udit Narayan
Aandhiyan	"Ye Wada Karle Wada"	Bappi Lahiri	Anjaan	Manhar Udhas
Aandhiyan	"Duniya Mein Tere Siva" (sad)	Bappi Lahiri	Anjaan	solo
Aashiqui	"Jaane Jigar Jaaneman"	Nadeem–Shravan	Sameer	Kumar Sanu
Aashiqui	"Main Duniya Bhula Doonga"	Nadeem–Shravan	Sameer	Kumar Sanu
Aashiqui	"Nazar Ke Saamne" (duet)	Nadeem–Shravan	Sameer	Kumar Sanu
Aashiqui	"Tu Meri Zindagi Hain"	Nadeem–Shravan	Sameer	Kumar Sanu
Aashiqui	"Dheere Dheere Se"	Nadeem–Shravan	Sameer	Kumar Sanu
Aashiqui	"Jaane Jigar Jaaneman (II)"	Nadeem–Shravan	Sameer	Kumar Sanu
Aashiqui	"Mera Dil Tere Liye"	Nadeem–Shravan	Sameer	Udit Narayan
Aashiqui	"Bas Ek Sanam Chaahiye (female)"	Nadeem–Shravan	Sameer	solo
Agneekaal	"Mangti Hoon Sajan Bas Ek Baar"	Pankaj Bhatt	Shyam Raj	Mohammed Aziz
Amba	"Maa Ka Man Mamta Ka Mandir"	Laxmikant–Pyarelal	Anand Bakshi	Mohammed Aziz
Amba	"Ek Swarg Hai Aasman Par"	Laxmikant–Pyarelal	Anand Bakshi	Suresh Wadkar, Mohammed Aziz, Kavita Krishnamurthy
Amiri Garibi	"Babul Bhi Roye"	Laxmikant–Pyarelal	Anand Bakshi	Kavita Krishnamurthy
Apmaan Ki Aag	"Diya Diya Dil Diya"	Nadeem–Shravan	Anwar Sagar	Mohammed Aziz
Apmaan Ki Aag	"Aaj Pyaar Ho Jaane Do"	Nadeem–Shravan	Anwar Sagar	Mohammed Aziz
Apradhinee	"Mila Hain Dil Se Dil Sanam"	Jeetu–Tapan	Kulwant Jani	Suresh Wadkar
Atishbaz	"Hawaon Se"	Laxmikant–Pyarelal	Sameer	Mohammed Aziz
Atishbaz	"Jeene Marne Ka"	Laxmikant–Pyarelal	Sameer	Suresh Wadkar
Aulad Ki Khatir	"Main Rapat Likha Doongi Pyaar Ke Baare Mein"	Ravi	Ravi	solo
Awaargi	"Mujrewali Hoon"	Anu Malik	Anand Bakshi	solo
Awaaz De Kahan Hai	"Chaha To Humne Magar"	Naushad	Hasan Kamal	Mohammed Aziz
Awaaz De Kahan Hai	"Yaar Na Aaya Yaar Na Aaya"	Naushad	Hasan Kamal	Mohammed Aziz
Awaaz De Kahan Hai	"Aayi Re Holi Aayi"	Naushad	Hasan Kamal	Mohammed Aziz
Awaaz De Kahan Hai	"Rulane Ko Aansu" (Female)	Naushad	Hasan Kamal	solo
Awaaz De Kahan Hai	"Darpan Jo Dekha To Khud Se Lajayi"	Naushad	Hasan Kamal	solo
Azaad Desh Ke Ghulam	"Saare Shikwe Gile"	Laxmikant–Pyarelal	Sameer	Mohammed Aziz
Baaghi	"Maang Teri Saja Doon Main"	Anand–Milind	Sameer	Amit Kumar
Baaghi	"Kaisa Lagta Hhain, Achchha Lagta Hain"	Anand–Milind	Sameer	Amit Kumar
Baaghi	"Kaisa Lagta Hain, Achchha Lagta Hain" (sad)	Anand–Milind	Sameer	Amit Kumar
Baap Numbri Beta Dus Numbri	"Pehli Baar Hua Hain"	Nadeem–Shravan	Sameer	Mohammed Aziz
Baap Numbri Beta Dus Numbri	"Mohabbat Humne Ki Hai"	Nadeem–Shravan	Sameer	Udit Narayan
Badnaam	"Pandrah Se Satrah Ke Beech Wala Saal"	Ajay Swami	Verma Malik	solo
Bahaar Aane Tak	"Mohabbat Inaayat Karam Dekhte Hai"	Rajesh Roshan	Ibrahim Ashq	Pankaj Udhas
Bahaar Aane Tak	"Dil Ke Kareeb Koyi Chhupa Hai"	Rajesh Roshan	Ibrahim Ashq	Talat Aziz
Bahaar Aane Tak	"Aankhen Aankhen Mehkhana Hain"	Rajesh Roshan	Ibrahim Ashq	Kumar Sanu
Bahaar Aane Tak	"Din Patjhad Ka Ya Baharein Ho"	Rajesh Roshan	Mohan Sharma	Manhar Udhas
Bahaar Aane Tak	"Kab Se Khadi Hoon Jagdambe Maa" (version 1)	Rajesh Roshan	Tajdar Taj	solo
Bahaar Aane Tak	"Kab Se Khadi Hoon Jagdambe Maa" (version 2)	Rajesh Roshan	Tajdar Taj	solo
Bahaar Aane Tak	"Kaali Teri Choti Hai Paranda Teri Laalni"	Rajesh Roshan	Indeevar	Mangal Singh
Bahaar Aane Tak	"Nazar Milata Kabhi Tujhse"	Rajesh Roshan	Indeevar	Gurcharan
Bandh Darwaza	"Main Ik Chingaari Thi"	Anand–Milind	Kafil Azar	solo
Choron Ki Rani Hasino Ka Raja	"O Meri Rani, Hosh Mein Aaja"	Anwar–Usman	Mahendra Dalvi	Kavita Krishnamurthy
Choron Ki Rani Hasino Ka Raja	"Main Rani Hoon Duniyawaalon"	Anwar–Usman	Mahendra Dalvi	Kavita Krishnamurthy
Choron Ki Rani Hasino Ka Raja	"Pehen Ke Choli Jaipur Ki"	Anwar–Usman	Mahendra Dalvi	Kavita Krishnamurthy
College Girl	"Aankhon Mein Basa Lo"	Babul Bose	Indeevar	Suresh Wadkar
College Girl	"Ho Gaya Tera Mera Juda Raasta"	Babul Bose	Indeevar	Suresh Wadkar
College Girl	"Pyaar Mein Yaar Se"	Babul Bose	Indeevar	Suresh Wadkar
Dil	"Mujhe Neend Na Aaye"	Anand–Milind	Sameer	Udit Narayan
Dil	"Hum Pyaar Karne Wale"	Anand–Milind	Sameer	Udit Narayan
Dil	"Dam Dama Dam"	Anand–Milind	Sameer	Udit Narayan
Dil	"O Priya Priya"	Anand–Milind	Sameer	Suresh Wadkar
Doodh Ka Karz	"Tumhein Dil Se Kaise Juda Hum Karenge"	Anu Malik	Anand Bakshi	Mohammed Aziz
Doodh Ka Karz	"Shuru Ho Rahi Hai Prem Kahani"	Anu Malik	Anand Bakshi	Mohammed Aziz
Doodh Ka Karz	"Mere Munne Bhool Na Jaana"	Anu Malik	Anand Bakshi	Mohammed Aziz
Doodh Ka Karz	"Been Bajata Ja Sapare"	Anu Malik	Anand Bakshi	solo
Ghar Ho To Aisa	"Dil Laga Ke Dekho"	Bappi Lahiri	Majrooh Sultanpuri	Sudesh Bhosle
Haatim Tai	"Tum Haseen Kis Kadar Ho"	Laxmikant–Pyarelal	Hasan Kamal	Mohammad Aziz
Haatim Tai	"Oye Sanam"	Laxmikant–Pyarelal	Hasan Kamal	solo
Haatim Tai	"Ae Jana Jane Jana"	Laxmikant–Pyarelal	Hasan Kamal	solo
Halaat	"Hothon Se Mohabbat Ka Izhaar Nahin Karte"	Usha Khanna	Nida Fazli	Mohammed Aziz, Bhupinder Singh
Jaan Lada Denge	"Kabhi Andar Toh Kabhi Bahaar"	Usha Khanna	Indeevar	Shabbir Kumar
Jawani Zindabad	"Husn Ishq Ki Yeh Kahani"	Anand–Milind	Verma Malik	Mohammed Aziz
Jungle Love	"Laila Ne Kaha Jo Majnu Se"	Anand–Milind	Sameer	Manhar Udhas
Jungle Love	"Hum Toh The Anjaane"	Anand–Milind	Sameer	solo
Jungle Love	"Koyaliya Gaati Hai, Paayaliya Chhankati Hai"	Anand–Milind	Sameer	solo
Kafan	"Zindagi Ka Kya Bharosa"	Anand–Milind	Sameer	solo
Kanoon Ki Zanjeer	"Dekh Kali Phool Bani Aaj Tere Haar Ki"	Laxmikant–Pyarelal	Majrooh Sultanpuri	solo
Karishma Kudrat Ka	"Bheegi Bheegi Raat Mein"	Kewal Kumar	N/A	Shabbir Kumar
Karmyoddha	"Kadam Kadam Mere Jadoo Laage"	Ajit Varman	Nadira Babbar	Amit Kumar
Kasam Dhande Ki	"A B C D" (duet)	Vijay	Khalid	Amit Kumar
Kasam Dhande Ki	"Mehlon Ka Dulha"	Vijay	Khalid	Amit Kumar, Udit Narayan, Vijayta Pandit
Kasam Jhoot Ki	"Apne Apne Kismat Hai Yeh"	Jeetu–Tapan	Kulwant Jani, Hasrat Jaipuri	solo
Kasam Jhoot Ki	"Yeh Sama Hai Pyaar Ka Sama"	Jeetu–Tapan	Kulwant Jani, Hasrat Jaipuri	Suresh Wadkar
Lohe Ke Haath	"Main Baadal Hoon, Barkha Tu"	Usha Khanna	Anjaan	Mohammed Aziz
Lohe Ke Haath	"Yeh Raat Gulaabi, Yeh Hawa Sharabi"	Usha Khanna	Anjaan	solo
Lootera Sultan	"Solah Varsh Tak Baap Ne Pa"	Bajju	Bajju, Pnkaj Shukla, Rafique Shaheen	solo
Maha-Sangram	"Do Dooni Chaar Hua Re"	Anand–Milind	Sameer	Amit Kumar
Maha-Sangram	"Aa Bahon Mein Aa"	Anand–Milind	Sameer	Amit Kumar
Majboor	"Mere Sanam Tere Sar Ki Kasam"	Laxmikant–Pyarelal	Anand Bakshi	Mohammed Aziz
Majboor	"Rim Jhim Barast Bahar Pani"	Laxmikant–Pyarelal	Anand Bakshi	Mohammed Aziz
Majboor	"Dhak Dhak Tera Dil Dhadke"	Laxmikant–Pyarelal	Anand Bakshi	Mohammed Aziz
Meri Lalkar	"Dushman Ban Ke Aaj Main Teri"	Vijay Batalvi	Sanam Ghazipuri	solo
Naya Khoon	"Main Garib Dilwala Hoon"	Usha Khanna	Indeevar	Kishore Kumar
Naya Khoon	"Dard Sabhi Ka Ek Jaisa"	Usha Khanna	Indeevar	Kishore Kumar
Naya Khoon	"Meethi Woh Murli"	Usha Khanna	Indeevar	Bhupinder Singh
Naya Khoon	"Hum Jisse Lipat Kar Ro Lete"	Usha Khanna	Indeevar	Suresh Wadkar
Nyaya Anyay	"Aaj Teri Baahon Mein" (happy)	Anand–Milind	Majrooh Sultanpuri	Mangal Singh
Nyaya Anyay	"Raat Jaan-e-Jaan"	Anand–Milind	Majrooh Sultanpuri	solo
Paap Ki Kamaee	"Ishq Ka Naam Khudaai"	Anu Malik	Indeevar	Pankaj Udhas
Pati Parmeshwar	"Nahin Nahin Aaj Nahin"	Laxmikant–Pyarelal	Rajendra Krishan	solo
Phir Lehraya Laal Dupatta	"Kya Karte The Saajna"	Anand–Milind	Majrooh Sultanpuri	Udit Narayan
Phir Lehraya Laal Dupatta	"Na Jaane Kyun Main Beqaraar"	Anand–Milind	Majrooh Sultanpuri	Udit Narayan
Phir Lehraya Laal Dupatta	"Main Gul Hoon, Kali Hoib"	Anand–Milind	Majrooh Sultanpuri	Mohammed Aziz
Phir Lehraya Laal Dupatta	"Tumne Rakh Toh Li Tasveer Hamari"	Anand–Milind	Majrooh Sultanpuri	Pankaj Udhas
Pyar Ka Karz	"Laagi Nahin Chhute Rama"	Laxmikant–Pyarelal	Anand Bakshi	Sudesh Bhosle
Pyar Ka Karz	"I Love You, Ye Jo Aag Lagi Hai Dil Mein"	Laxmikant–Pyarelal	Anand Bakshi	Sudesh Bhosle
Shandar	"Saawan Barasta Hai"	Bappi Lahiri	Anjaan	Mohammed Aziz
Shandar	"Bade Logon Ki Badi Baat"	Bappi Lahiri	Anjaan	Shabbir Kumar, Alka Yagnik
Sherdil	"Aur Bhale Kuchh Bhi Ho Jaaye"	Laxmikant–Pyarelal	Anand Bakshi	solo
Sheshnaag	"Hamein Aasmaan Ne Bheja"	Laxmikant–Pyarelal	Anand Bakshi	Suresh Wadkar
Sheshnaag	"Humein Aasmaan Ne Bheja" (sad)	Laxmikant–Pyarelal	Anand Bakshi	Suresh Wadkar
Sheshnaag	"Chhed Milan Ke Geet Mitwa"	Laxmikant–Pyarelal	Anand Bakshi	Suresh Wadkar
Sheshnaag	"O Mere Dushman"	Laxmikant–Pyarelal	Anand Bakshi	solo
Souten Ki Beti	"Tu Saajan Ka Pyaar Hai"	Ved Pal	Saawan Kumar Tak	Sadhana Sargam
Souten Ki Beti	"Likh Diya Hai Yeh Mummy Ne Khat Mein"	Ved Pal	Saawan Kumar Tak	solo
Souten Ki Beti	"Yeh Ji Halka Halka Suroor Hai"	Ved Pal	Saawan Kumar Tak	Kishore Kumar
Swarg	"Kaise Kate Din, Kaise Kate Raaten"	Anand–Milind	Sameer	Mohammed Aziz
Tejaa	"Ambua Ka Ped Hai"	Anu Malik	Hasrat Jaipuri	solo
Teri Talash Mein	"Pyasi Naina Tujhe Bulayen"	Naresh Sharma	Sameer	solo
Teri Talash Mein	"Aise Chham Chham Baaje Payaliya"	Naresh Sharma	Sameer	solo
Thanedaar	"Tamma Tamma Loge"	Bappi Lahiri	Indeevar	Bappi Lahiri
Tum Mere Ho	"Maine Daba Lee Thi" (version 1)	Anand–Milind	Majrooh Sultanpuri	solo
Tum Mere Ho	"Maine Daba Lee Thi" (version 2)	Anand–Milind	Majrooh Sultanpuri	solo
Yaadon Ke Mausam	"Ik Chand Ko Hum Bhi Dekhenge"	Anand–Milind	Salauddin Parvez	Amit Kumar
Yaadon Ke Mausam	"Dil Mein Aja Phir Teri Yaad Ka Mausam Aaya"	Anand–Milind	Salauddin Parvez	Suresh Wadkar
Yaadon Ke Mausam	"Jab Hizr Ki Shab Pani Barse"	Anand–Milind	Salauddin Parvez	Bhupinder Singh
Yaadon Ke Mausam	"Chaudhvin Raat Hain"	Anand–Milind	Salauddin Parvez	Suresh Oberoi
Yaadon Ke Mausam	"Tujhse Buchhad Ke Zinda Hain"	Anand–Milind	Salauddin Parvez	solo
Zahreelay	"Pal Mein Khafa"	Anand–Milind	Majrooh Sultanpuri	Mohammed Aziz
Zimmedaar	"O Dekho Arey Dekho"	Anu Malik	Amit Kumar	Shabbir Kumar
Zimmedaar	"Pehle Hafte Mein"	Anu Malik	Farooq Kaiser	Shabbir Kumar

==== 1991 ====
Film	Song	Composer(s)	Writer(s)	Co-artist(s)
Ayee Milan Ki Raat	"Kitne Dinon Ke Baad Hai Aayi	Anand–Milind	Sameer	Mohammed Aziz
Ayee Milan Ki Raat	"Tune Pyar Ki Been Bajai"	Anand–Milind	Sameer	Mohammed Aziz
Ayee Milan Ki Raat	"Kasam Se Kasam Se"	Anand–Milind	Sameer	Mohammed Aziz
Ayee Milan Ki Raat	"Saawan Ka Mahina Aaya Hai"	Anand–Milind	Sameer	Mohammed Aziz
Ayee Milan Ki Raat	"Dekhen Apni Kismat Mein Kaanta"	Anand–Milind	Sameer	Mohammed Aziz
Ayee Milan Ki Raat	"Jab Do Dil Milte Hai"	Anand–Milind	Sameer	Mohammed Aziz
Ayee Milan Ki Raat	"Kala Shah Kala"	Anand–Milind	Sameer	solo
Ayee Milan Ki Raat	"Ishaq Da Rog Laga"	Anand–Milind	Sameer	solo
Ayee Milan Ki Raat	"Mat Ro Mere Dil"	Anand–Milind	Sameer	Udit Narayan
Ayee Milan Ki Raat	"Maine Kisiko Dil De Diya"	Anand–Milind	Sameer	Udit Narayan
Ayee Milan Ki Raat	"Har Ek Se Milna Hans Hans Kar"	Anand–Milind	Sameer	Suresh Wadkar
Ajooba	"O Mera Jaan-e-Bahaar Aa Gaya"	Laxmikant–Pyarelal	Anand Bakshi	Alka Yagnik, Sudesh Bhosle, Mohammed Aziz
Anjaane Rishte	"Aashiqon Ka Naam Aur Ooncha Hun Kar Jaayenge"	Anand–Milind	Majrooh Sultanpuri	Udit Narayan
Baat Hai Pyaar Ki	"Guftagoo Yaar Ki, Zulf Rukhsar Ki"	Vijay Batalvi	Ameer Qazalbash	Manhar Udhas
Baat Hai Pyaar Ki	"Jab Se Tere Pyaar Ka Saawan Barsa Hai"	Vijay Batalvi	Ameer Qazalbash	Manhar Udhas
Baat Hai Pyaar Ki	"Sab Kuchh Hai Duniya Mein Lekin"	Vijay Batalvi	Ameer Qazalbash	solo
Banjaran	"Desh Badalte Hain"	Laxmikant–Pyarelal	Anand Bakshi	Sukhwinder Singh
Bhabhi	"Chandi Ki Cycle, Sone Ki Seat"	Anu Malik	Hasrat Jaipuri	Nitin Mukesh
Dastoor	"Kaanon Mein Pehen Kar Baala"	Anand–Milind	Majrooh Sultanpuri	Mohammed Aziz
Dastoor	"Aao Milan Ka Jashan Manaye"	Anand–Milind	Majrooh Sultanpuri	Abhijeet Bhattacharya
Dastoor	"Hum Khade Hain Raah Mein"	Anand–Milind	Majrooh Sultanpuri	solo
Dastoor	"Suna Hai Jaha Ek Tere Bina"	Anand–Milind	Majrooh Sultanpuri	solo
Dastoor	"Idhar Bhi Nazar Ho"	Anand–Milind	Majrooh Sultanpuri	solo
Dastoor	"Kaho Baharo Se Aaye Na Aaye"	Anand–Milind	Majrooh Sultanpuri	solo
Deshwasi	"Saawan Ka Mahina Pawan Kar Shor"	Laxmikant–Pyarelal	Anand Bakshi	solo
Deshwasi	"Jivan Ek Sangraam Hai, Subah Savere Sabase Pahale"	Laxmikant–Pyarelal	Anand Bakshi	Nitin Mukesh
Deshwasi	"Kal Kisne Dekha, Kal Aaye Na Aaye"	Laxmikant–Pyarelal	Anand Bakshi	Nitin Mukesh
Deshwasi	"Tere Liye Mai Bana Hu"	Laxmikant–Pyarelal	Anand Bakshi	Nitin Mukesh
Deshwasi	"Mere Deshwashao"	Laxmikant–Pyarelal	Anand Bakshi	Nitin Mukesh
Deshwasi	"Barason Ke Baad Uthi, Aaj Holi Hai"	Laxmikant–Pyarelal	Anand Bakshi	Kavita Krishnamurthy, Nitin Mukesh
Dil Hai Ki Manta Nahin	"Dil Hai Ke Manta Nahin" (Duet)	Nadeem–Shravan	Faaiz Anwar	Kumar Sanu
Dil Hai Ki Manta Nahin	"Kaise Mizaj Aap Ke Hain"	Nadeem–Shravan	Faaiz Anwar	Kumar Sanu
Dil Hai Ki Manta Nahin	"Adayein Bhi Hain"	Nadeem–Shravan	Sameer	Kumar Sanu
Dil Hai Ki Manta Nahin	"Tu Pyaar Hai Kisi Aur Ka"	Nadeem–Shravan	Sameer	Kumar Sanu
Dil Hai Ki Manta Nahin	"Galyat Sankali Sonyachi"	Nadeem–Shravan	Sameer	Babla Mehta, Debashish Dasgupta
Dil Hai Ki Manta Nahin	"O Mere Sapno Ke Saudagar"	Nadeem–Shravan	Sameer	solo
Dil Hai Ki Manta Nahin	"Mainu Ishq Da Lagiya Rog"	Nadeem–Shravan	Sameer	solo
Dil Hai Ki Manta Nahin	"Dil Hai Ke Manta Nahin" (Female)	Nadeem–Shravan	Faaiz Anwar	solo
Dil Hai Ki Manta Nahin	"Hum To Mashoor Hue"	Nadeem–Shravan	Rani Malik	solo
Dil Hai Ki Manta Nahin	"Dil Tujhpe Aa Gaya"	Nadeem–Shravan	Sameer	Abhijeet Bhattacharya
Dil Hai Ki Manta Nahin	"Dulhan Tu Doolah Main"	Nadeem–Shravan	Aziz Khan	Debashish Dasgupta
Dushman Devta	"Thari Aur Mhari"	Bappi Lahiri	Indeevar	solo
Farishtay	"Bhai Bahen Ka Pyaar" (version 1)	Bappi Lahiri	Anand Bakshi	Mohammed Aziz, Amit Kumar
Farishtay	"Bhai Bahen Ka Pyaar" (version 1)	Bappi Lahiri	Anand Bakshi	Mohammed Aziz, Amit Kumar
Farishtay	"Bhai Bahen Ka Pyaar" (sad)	Bappi Lahiri	Anand Bakshi	Mohammed Aziz, Amit Kumar
Fateh	"Tum Jo Bane Humdard Hamare"	Naresh Sharma	Indeevar	Mohammed Aziz
Garajna	"Aaj Main Naachungi"	Bappi Lahiri	Anjaan	solo
Hafta Bandh	"Yaar Masti Mein Gaa"	Bappi Lahiri	Javed Akhtar	Sudesh Bhosle
Hai Meri Jaan	"Hai Meri Jaan"	Bappi Lahiri	Mahendra Dalvi	Bappi Lahiri
Hai Meri Jaan	"Oye Mikanto"	Bappi Lahiri	Indeevar	Bappi Lahiri
Hai Meri Jaan	"Maine Tumko Dil Diya Hai Jaanam"	Bappi Lahiri	Indeevar	Bappi Lahiri
Hai Meri Jaan	"He Jaanam Main Diwani Tu Diwana"	Bappi Lahiri	Indeevar	Bappi Lahiri
Hai Meri Jaan	"Maine Tujhko" (sad)	Bappi Lahiri	Indeevar	Bappi Lahiri
Hai Meri Jaan	"Kya Baat Hai Meri Aankhon Mein"	Bappi Lahiri	Naqsh Lyallpuri	solo
Hai Meri Jaan	"Tere Chehre Ko Mila Rang"	Bappi Lahiri	Naqsh Lyallpuri	Mohammad Aziz
Haque	"Zulfen Ulajh Gayi Hain"	Anand–Milind	Sameer	solo
House No. 13	"Chanda Mama"	Enoch Daniels	Yogesh	solo
Hum To Pyaar Karenge	"Aise Hasrat Se Na Dekho"	Babul Bose	Ravinder Rawal	K. J. Yesudas
Hum To Pyaar Karenge	"Ab Ke Baras Yeh Sawan Ki Jhadi"	Babul Bose	Ravinder Rawal	K. J. Yesudas
Hum To Pyaar Karenge	"Lal Lal Chudiyan"	Babul Bose	Ravinder Rawal	Mohammad Aziz
Hum To Pyaar Karenge	"Main Pyaar Banoon Tera Dilbar"	Babul Bose	Ravinder Rawal	Mohammad Aziz
Hum To Pyaar Karenge	"Tere Gore Gore Gaal"	Babul Bose	Ravinder Rawal	Mohammad Aziz
Hum To Pyaar Karenge	"Pyaar Agar Jurm Hai"	Babul Bose	Ravinder Rawal	Udit Narayan
Hum To Pyaar Karenge	"Tujhe Kasam Hai Laila Ki"	Babul Bose	Ravinder Rawal	Udit Narayan
Hum To Pyaar Karenge	"Ishq Leta Hai Ashiqon Ki Imtihaan"	Babul Bose	Ravinder Rawal	Suresh Wadkar
Hum To Pyaar Karenge	"O Mitwa Door Woh Zameen Pe"	Babul Bose	Ravinder Rawal	Kumar Sanu
Izzat	"Meri Chhammak Chhallo"	Anu Malik	Anand Bakshi	Mohammed Aziz
Jaan Ki Kasam	"I Just Call To Say I Love You"	Nadeem–Shravan	Sameer	Udit Narayan
Jaan Ki Kasam	"Cham Cham Chamke Chandni"	Nadeem–Shravan	Sameer	solo
Jaan Ki Kasam	"Jo Hum Na Milenge, To Gul Na Khilenge" (version 1)	Nadeem–Shravan	Sameer	Kumar Sanu
Jaan Ki Kasam	"Jo Hum Na Milenge, To Gul Na Khilenge" (version 2)	Nadeem–Shravan	Sameer	Kumar Sanu
Jaan Ki Kasam	"Barsaat Ho Rahi, Barsaat Hone De"	Nadeem–Shravan	Sameer	Kumar Sanu
Jaan Ki Kasam	"So Ja Chup Ho Ja"	Nadeem–Shravan	Sameer	Kumar Sanu
Jaan Pehchan	"Akhiyan Mila Ke Mujhe Pyaar Sikha Ke"	Iqbal Gill	Vishwanitra Sonie	solo
Jaan Pehchan	"Jo Bhi Kahoongi, Main Sach Kahoongi"	Iqbal Gill	Vishwanitra Sonie	solo
Jane Mehboob	"Ab Kahan Pyar Mein"	O. P. Nayyar	Noor Devasi	Mahendra Kapoor
Jane Mehboob	"Dil Tum Pe Hamara Agar Aayega"	O. P. Nayyar	Noor Devasi	solo
Jane Mehboob	"Jhonke Hawa Ke Sajna Se Jake"	O. P. Nayyar	Noor Devasi	solo
Jane Mehboob	"Pehli Barsaat Mein Bheegi Hoon"	O. P. Nayyar	Noor Devasi	solo
Jeena Teri Gali Mein	"Jeena Teri Gali Mein"	Babul Bose	Ravinder Rawal	S. P. Balasubrahmanyam
Jeena Teri Gali Mein	"Tere Hum Ae Sanam"	Babul Bose	Ravinder Rawal	Kumar Sanu
Jeena Teri Gali Mein	"Aaj Is Rut Mein"	Babul Bose	Ravinder Rawal	Kumar Sanu
Jeena Teri Gali Mein	"Jaate Ho Pardes Piya"	Babul Bose	Ravinder Rawal	Nitin Mukesh
Jeena Teri Gali Mein	"Jeevan Ek Samundar Hai"	Babul Bose	Ravinder Rawal	Nitin Mukesh
Jeena Teri Gali Mein	"Aa Pyar Ke Rang Bharen"	Babul Bose	Ravinder Rawal	Mohammed Aziz
Jeena Teri Gali Mein	"Meri Jindari Tere Haathon Mein"	Babul Bose	Ravinder Rawal	Mohammed Aziz
Jeena Teri Gali Mein	"Tumse Hamara Vada Hai Hamdam"	Babul Bose	Ravinder Rawal	Udit Narayan
Jeena Teri Gali Mein	"Mildi Naseeban Naal Mohabbat"	Babul Bose	Naqsh Lyallpuri	Debashish Dasgupta
Jungle Beauty	"Jungle Beauty"	Bappi Lahiri	Shaily Shailendra	solo
Jungle Queen	"Naache Mayura"	Anand–Milind	Sameer	solo
Khatra	"Mohabbat Ki Ada Kya Hoti Hai"	Aadesh Shrivastava	Shyam Raj	Vishwajeet
Kasam Kaali Ki	"Aaj Koi Teer-e-Sitam"	Kamal Kant	Kulwant Jani, Yogesh, Naadaan	solo
Khooni Panja	"Pandit Ne Sach Hi Kaha Hai"	Surinder Kohli	Akhtar Indori, Gauhar Kanpuri, Balbir Nirdosh	Udit Narayan
Kohraam	"Jaffi Paale"	Bappi Lahiri	Indeevar	Bappi Lahiri
Kurbaan	"Yeh Dharti Chand Sitare"	Anand–Milind	Sameer	Udit Narayan
Kurbaan	"Baitha Neeli Jheel Kinare"	Anand–Milind	Sameer	Suresh Wadkar
Meena Bazar	"Bhari Mehfil Mein"	Naresh Sharma	Sameer	solo
Meet Mere Man Ke	"Meet Mere Man Ke"	Babul Bose	Ravindra Rawal	Mohammad Aziz
Meet Mere Man Ke	"Sadiyon Ka Hai Yeh Safar"	Babul Bose	Ravindra Rawal	Mohammad Aziz
Naag Mani	"Dushman-e-Jaan Ko Hum Apni Jaan Bana Baithe"	Anu Malik	Hasrat Jaipuri	Shabbir Kumar
Naag Mani	"Dil Jo Hamara Aahein Na Bharta"	Anu Malik	Santosh Anand	Suresh Wadkar
Naag Mani	"Parbat Ki Oonchayi Par Thehar Gayi Thi Shaam"	Anu Malik	Santosh Anand	Suresh Wadkar
Naag Mani	"Aashiqon Ka Naam Aur Ooncha Kar Jayenge"	Anu Malik	Santosh Anand	Vipin Sachdeva
Naag Mani	"Zindagi Mein Jeete Jeete Marna Zaroor Tha"	Anu Malik	Santosh Anand	Kumar Sanu
Naag Mani	"Dil Toot Gaya Tha"	Anu Malik	Santosh Anand	solo
Naag Mani	"Likh De Piya Ja Naam Sakhi Ri"	Anu Malik	Santosh Anand	solo
Naag Mani	"Mera Laung Gawacha"	Anu Malik	Dev Kohli	solo
Naag Mani	"Chan Pardesi Mere Chan Pardesi"	Anu Malik	Dev Kohli	Sukhwinder Singh
Naamcheen	"Mere Preetam Mere Baalam"	Anu Malik	Dev Kohli	Babla Mehta
Nachnewale Gaanewale	"Sambola Jambo Jambo"	Bappi Lahiri	Mahendra Dalvi	Vijay Benedict, Sukhwinder Singh
Nachnewale Gaanewale	"Aaye Hum Nachnewale"	Bappi Lahiri	Mahendra Dalvi	Vijay Benedict, Sukhwinder Singh
Nachnewale Gaanewale	"Hero Se Milne Heroine Aayi"	Bappi Lahiri	Mahendra Dalvi	Vijay Benedict, Udit Narayan
Nachnewale Gaanewale	"Ban Ke Saajan Ghar Aaye"	Bappi Lahiri	Mahendra Dalvi	solo
Nachnewale Gaanewale	"Mian Jaanti Hoon, Tun Janate Ho"	Bappi Lahiri	Anjaan	solo
Paigham	"Al Madad"	Yunus Malik	Hasan Kamal	solo
Paigham	"Ek Nazar Dekh Kar"	Yunus Malik	Hasan Kamal	solo
Paigham	"Tadpaaye Tera Pyaar"	G. S. Kohli	Hasan Kamal	Hemlata
Pathar Ke Insan	Bappi Lahiri	"Kaali Maata"	Indeevar	Amit Kumar
Phool Aur Kaante	"Pehli Baarish Main Aur Tu"	Nadeem–Shravan	Rani Malik	Kumar Sanu
Phool Aur Kaante	"Maine Pyaar Tumhi Se Kiya Hai"	Nadeem–Shravan	Sameer	Kumar Sanu
Pratigyabadh	"Dhin Tara Bole Man Ka Ik Tara" (Duet)	Kalyanji–Anandji	Hasan Kamal	Mahendra Kapoor
Pratigyabadh	"Dhin Tara Bole Man Ka Ik Tara" (female)	Kalyanji–Anandji	Hasan Kamal	solo
Pratikaar	"Bahaar Saare Mele"	Bappi Lahiri	Anand Bakshi	Sudesh Bhosle
Pyaar Bhara Dil	"Ban Ke Kitaab Teri, Tere Seene Se Lipta Rahoonga"	Nikhil–Vinay	Yogesh	Udit Narayan
Pyaar Bhara Dil	"Dil Dil Pyaar Bhara Dil"	Nikhil–Vinay	Yogesh	Udit Narayan
Pyaar Bhara Dil	"Karo Yeh Sanam Aaj Vaada"	Nikhil–Vinay	Yogesh	Abhijeet Bhattacharya
Pyaar Bhara Dil	"Teri Pooja Karoob"	Nikhil–Vinay	Yogesh	Babla Mehta
Pyaar Bhara Dil	"Chand Ban Ke Tum Gagan Se"	Nikhil–Vinay	Yogesh	Kumar Sanu
Pyaar Bhara Dil	"Tune Kal Hi To Maine Kaha Tha"	Nikhil–Vinay	Yogesh	Vipin Sachdeva
Ramwati	"Chham Chham Baaje Paayal"	Usha Khanna	Dilip Tahir	Udit Narayan
Ramwati	"Dushman Mere Armaan"	Usha Khanna	Mahendra Dalvi	solo
Rambhoomi	"Kaahe Mose Kare Jorajori"	Laxmikant–Pyarelal	Santosh Anand	solo
Rupaye Dus Karod	"Namaste Ji, Kahiye Kya Haal Hai"	Bappi Lahiri	Sikandar Bharti	Amit Kumar
Saajan	"Jiye To Jiye Kaise"	Nadeem–Shravan	Sameer	S. P. Balasubramanyam, Kumar Sanu
Saajan	"Bahut Pyar Karte Hain" (female)	Nadeem–Shravan	Sameer	solo
Saajan	"Jiye To Jiye Kaise" (female)	Nadeem–Shravan	Sameer	solo
Saajan	"Bahut Pyar Karte Hain" (duet)	Nadeem–Shravan	Sameer	S. P. Balasubramanyam
Saanson Ki Sargam	"Saanson Ki Sargam Pe"	S. Surendra	Anand Tripathi	solo
Saanson Ki Sargam	"Saanson Ki Sargam Pe" (sad)	S. Surendra	Anand Tripathi	solo
Saathi	"Hui Aankh Nam"	Nadeem–Shravan	Sameer	solo
Saathi	"Tera Naam Sab Ke Lab Pe"	Nadeem–Shravan	Sameer	solo
Saathi	"Aaj Hum Tum O Sanam"	Nadeem–Shravan	Sameer	Jolly Mukherjee
Saathi	"Har Ghadi Bekhudi"	Nadeem–Shravan	Sameer	Udit Narayan
Sadak	"Jab Jab Pyar Pe" (Duet)	Nadeem–Shravan	Sameer	Kumar Sanu
Sadak	"Tumhein Apna Banaane Ki" (Duet)	Nadeem–Shravan	Sameer	Kumar Sanu
Sadak	"Mohabbat Ki Hai"	Nadeem–Shravan	Sameer	Kumar Sanu
Sadak	"Tak Dhin Dhin Tak"	Nadeem–Shravan	Sameer	Kumar Sanu, Babla Mehta
Sadak	"Hum Tere Bin Kahi Rah"	Nadeem–Shravan	Sameer	Manhar Udhas
Sadak	"Tumhein Apna Banaane Ki" (Female)	Nadeem–Shravan	Sameer	solo
Sadak	"Jab Jab Pyar Pe Pehra" (Female)	Nadeem–Shravan	Sameer	solo
Sadak	"Kya Socha Hai Ae Dil"	Nadeem–Shravan	Rani Malik	solo
Sadak	"Zamaane Ke Dekhe" (Female)	Nadeem–Shravan	Surendra Sathi	solo
Sadak	"Zamaane Ke Dekhe" (Duet)	Nadeem–Shravan	Surendra Sathi	Abhijeet
Sau Crore	"Naya Zamane Ka Hoon"	Bappi Lahiri	Suraj Sanim	Amit Kumar
Saugandh	"Teri Baahon Mein Jeena Hai"	Anand–Milind	Sameer	Mohammad Aziz
Saugandh	"Laila Ko Bhool Jayenge" (version 1)	Anand–Milind	Sameer	Mohammad Aziz
Saugandh	"Laila Ko Bhool Jayenge (version 2)	Anand–Milind	Sameer	Mohammad Aziz
Saugandh	"Meri Neend Churakar Le Gayi"	Anand–Milind	Sameer	Udit Narayan
Saugandh	"Haar Gaya Dil Fariyaad Karke"	Anand–Milind	Sameer	Anup Jalota, Pramila
Saugandh	"Mera Kehna Maan Sitamgar"	Anand–Milind	Sameer	solo
Saugandh	"Shivam Shivam"	Anand–Milind	Sameer	solo
Saugandh	"Aa Bhi Jaa Mahiya"	Anand–Milind	Sameer	Debashish Dasgupta
Saugandh	"Ek Doosre Mein Aao"	Anand–Milind	Sameer	Anand
Saugandh	"Mitwa Mere Saath Main Tere"	Anand–Milind	Anand Bakshi	Mohammed Aziz
Shankra	"Apna Banake Sapna Dikhake"	Laxmikant–Pyarelal	Hasan Kamal	solo
Shankra	"Behna O Behna"	Laxmikant–Pyarelal	Hasan Kamal	Mohammed Aziz
Shankra	"Behna O Behna" (sad)	Laxmikant–Pyarelal	Hasan Kamal	Mohammed Aziz
Shanti Kranti	"One Two Three"	Hamsalekha	Indeevar	S. P. Balasubrahmanyam
Shikari	"Namaste Namaste"	Anu Malik	Anand Bakshi	Anu Malik
Shikari	"I Love You"	Anu Malik	Anand Bakshi	Mohammed Aziz
Shikari	"Mere Dost Hindustani"	Anu Malik	Anand Bakshi	solo
Shikari	"Duniya Mein Kitne Watan"	Anu Malik	Anand Bakshi	Kavita Krishnamurthy, Mohammed Aziz
Shiv Raam	"Aa Yeh Haseen Raat Mohabbat Mein Gazaar De"	Rajesh Roshan	Anwar Sagar	Kumar Sanu
Swarg Jaisaa Ghar	"Aao Khelen Sanam Sanam"	Bappi Lahiri	Majrooh Sultanpuri	Mohammed Aziz
Swarg Yahan Narak Yahan	"Maine Tere Bahane Bijli Ko Chhu Liya Hai"	Rajesh Roshan	Indeevar	Udit Narayan
Swarg Yahan Narak Yahan	"Yeh Suraj Chand Sitare" (version 1)	Rajesh Roshan	Indeevar	Nitin Mukesh
Swarg Yahan Narak Yahan	"Nayan Tere Kirnon Ka Bhandar"	Rajesh Roshan	Indeevar	Nitin Mukesh, Sukhwinder Singh
Vishnu-Devaa	"Aaja Mere Pyaar, Tujhe Baar Baar"	Rajesh Roshan	Anjaan	Mohammed Aziz
Vishnu-Devaa	"Mere Vishnu, Mere Devaa"	Rajesh Roshan	Anjaan	Mohammed Aziz
Vishnu-Devaa	"Mere Vishnu Mere Devaa"	Rajesh Roshan	Anjaan	solo
Yaara Dildara	"Tum Hi Hamara Ho Manzil"	Jatin–Lalit	Majrooh Sultanpuri	Udit Narayan
Yeh Hai Ghar Ki Mahabharat	"Dilbar Kahoon Ki Dil Kahoon" (version 1)	Rajesh Roshan	Payam Sayeedi	Udit Narayan
Yeh Hai Ghar Ki Mahabharat	"Dilbar Kahoon Ki Dil Kahoon" (version 2)	Rajesh Roshan	Payam Sayeedi	Udit Narayan

==== 1992 ====
Film	Song	Composer(s)	Writer(s)	Co-artist(s)
Adharm	"Geet Banke Labon Pe"	Anand–Milind	Sameer	Pankaj Udhas
Adharm	"Geet Banke Labon Pe" (Sad)	Anand–Milind	Sameer	solo
Adharm	"Jalti Huyee Chingari"	Anand–Milind	Sameer	solo
Adharm	"Tere Mere Sapnon Ka Ghar"	Anand–Milind	Sameer	solo
Adharm	"Ek Baar To Kah De Tu"	Anand–Milind	Sameer	Mohammad Aziz
Bahu Beta Aur Maa	"Charkha Zindagi Ka"	Surinder Kohli	Kulwant Jani, Shadab Alawalpuri	solo
Benaam Rishte	"Koi Haseen Badi"	Sukhwinder Singh	Dr. Deepak, Ramesh Gohil	Sukhwinder Singh
Benaam Rishte	"Tune Yeh Kya Kiya"	Sukhwinder Singh	Dr. Deepak, Ramesh Gohil	solo
Beta	"Dhak Dhak Karne Laga"	Anand–Milind	Sameer	Udit Narayan
Beta	"Koyal Se Teri Boli"	Anand–Milind	Sameer	Udit Narayan
Beta	"Saiyan Ji Se Chupke"	Anand–Milind	Sameer	Udit Narayan
Beta	"Kushiyon Ka Din Aaya Hai"	Anand–Milind	Sameer	solo
Beta	"Sajna Main Teri"	Anand–Milind	Sameer	Vipin Sachdeva
Beta	"Dhadkane Saansein Jawani"	Dilip Sen–Sameer Sen	Dilip Tahir	Pankaj Udhas
Beta	"Yeh Do Dil Hain Chanchal"	Amar–Utpal	Naqsh Lyallpuri	Babla Mehta
Beta	"Kitna Pyara Yeh Chehra"	Naresh Sharma	Dev Kohli	Indrajeet
Beta	"Tu Nach Mundeya"	Naresh Sharma	Dev Kohli	Vipin Sachdeva
Daisy	"Sun Mere Jaane Jaana"	Kailash–Pradyuman	Madan Pal	Suresh Wadkar
Daulat Ki Jung	"Ruthi Aankhen Lekar Mujhko"	Anand–Milind	Majrooh Sultanpuri	solo
Daulat Ki Jung	"Ab Teer Chalen Talwar" (Sad)	Anand–Milind	Majrooh Sultanpuri	solo
Daulat Ki Jung	"Ab Teer Chalen Talwar"	Anand–Milind	Majrooh Sultanpuri	Udit Narayan
Daulat Ki Jung	"Bolo Sanam Kya"	Anand–Milind	Majrooh Sultanpuri	Udit Narayan
Ek Dhun Pyaar Ki	"Agar Mujhse Mohabbat Thi"	Aadesh Shrivastava	Shyam Raj	Suresh Wadkar
Ek Dhun Pyaar Ki	"Bahaane Na Karo"	Aadesh Shrivastava	Shyam Raj	Mangal Singh
Ek Dhun Pyaar Ki	"Phool Likhun Ke Hawa Likhun"	Aadesh Shrivastava	Shyam Raj	Pankaj Udhas
Ek Dhun Pyaar Ki	"Ek Dhun Sunaoon Pyaar Ki"	Aadesh Shrivastava	Shyam Raj	Pankaj Udhas
Ek Dhun Pyaar Ki	"Ek Chitthi Mili Mujhe Pyaar Ki"	Aadesh Shrivastava	Shyam Raj	Pankaj Udhas
Ek Dhun Pyaar Ki	"Mujhe Pyaar Ho Gaya Hai"	Aadesh Shrivastava	Shyam Raj	Pankaj Udhas
Ek Dhun Pyaar Ki	"Har Ghadi Dekha Karoon Woh Khwab Pyara"	Aadesh Shrivastava	Shyam Raj	Bhupinder Singh
Ek Dhun Pyaar Ki	"Chaha Hai Tumhi Ko"	Aadesh Shrivastava	Shyam Raj	Udit Narayan
Ek Dhun Pyaar Ki	"Chahat Ke Din Hain Saat"	Aadesh Shrivastava	Shyam Raj	Vipin Sachdeva
Ek Dhun Pyaar Ki	"Lal Nagri Ni Lal Kaghri"	Aadesh Shrivastava	Kulwant Jani	Vipin Sachdeva
Ek Dhun Pyaar Ki	"Jaa Ve Chhan Mahiya"	Aadesh Shrivastava	Kulwant Jani	Sukhwinder Singh
Ek Dhun Pyaar Ki	"Tere Naam Likh Di Hai Yeh Zindagaani"	Aadesh Shrivastava	Madan Pal	solo
Geet Milan Ke Gaate Rahenge	"Mausam Aate Jaate Rahenge" (version 1)	Manoj–Mahesh	Mithilesh Sinha	Udit Narayan
Geet Milan Ke Gaate Rahenge	"Mausam Aate Jaate Rahenge" (version 3)	Manoj–Mahesh	Mithilesh Sinha	Udit Narayan
Geet Milan Ke Gaate Rahenge	"Mausam Aate Jaate Rahenge" (version 2)	Manoj–Mahesh	Mithilesh Sinha	Renuka
Giraft	"Jhanjhar Baaje Re"	Anand–Milind	Nawab Arzoo	solo
Giraft	"Main Toh Gayi Hoon Dil Se"	Anand–Milind	Nawab Arzoo	solo
Honeymoon	"Aadha Tera Dil, Aadha Mera Dil"	Anand–Milind	Majrooh Sultanpuri	Amit Kumar
Honeymoon	"Yun Na Dekho Tasveer Ban Ke"	Anand–Milind	Majrooh Sultanpuri	Suresh Wadkar
Honeymoon	"Tu Neendon Ki Rani Aur Main Pyaar Ka Sapna"	Anand–Milind	Verma Malik	Udit Narayan
Humlaa	"Ab Tum Aaye Ho Toh"	Laxmikant–Pyarelal	Anand Bakshi	solo
Humlaa	"Shuru Shuru Ki Yeh Mulaaqaten"	Laxmikant–Pyarelal	Anand Bakshi	Mohammed Aziz
Humshakal	"Koi Baat Poochhe Bina"	Laxmikant–Pyarelal	Majrooh Sultanpuri	Mohammed Aziz
Humshakal	"Tere Dil Mein Rehna Hai"	Laxmikant–Pyarelal	Majrooh Sultanpuri	Mohammed Aziz
Ishq Khuda Hai	"Aa Ab Laut Ke Aaja"	Dilip Sen–Sameer Sen	P. D. Mehra, Dilip Tahir	solo
Ishq Khuda Hai	"Jhumka Mera Gaal Ko Choome"	Dilip Sen–Sameer Sen	P. D. Mehra, Dilip Tahir	solo
Ishq Khuda Hai	"Jab Tak Hai Yeh Chand"	Dilip Sen–Sameer Sen	P. D. Mehra, Dilip Tahir	Mohammed Aziz
Isi Ka Naam Zindagi	"Zara Ruk Jaa"	Bappi Lahiri	Ramesh Pant	Udit Narayan
Jaan Se Pyara	"Ek Ladka Tha"	Anand–Milind	Sameer	Mohammed Aziz
Jeena Marna Tere Sang	"Dil Ek Mandir Pyar Hai Pooja"	Dilip Sen-Sameer Sen	Ibrahim Ashq	solo
Jeena Marna Tere Sang	"Yeh Kya Hua"	Dilip Sen-Sameer Sen	Ibrahim Ashq	Vipin Sachdeva
Jeena Marna Tere Sang	"Tune Zamane Ye Kya Kar Diya"	Dilip Sen-Sameer Sen	Indeevar	Vipin Sachdeva
Jeena Marna Tere Sang	"Jo Sachche Premi Hain"	Dilip Sen-Sameer Sen	Dilip Tahir	Vipin Sachdeva
Jeena Marna Tere Sang	"Tumse Hai Kita Pyar Ye Hum Keh Nahin Sakte"	Dilip Sen-Sameer Sen	Dilip Tahir	Vipin Sachdeva
Jeena Marna Tere Sang	"Aa Tujhko Is Dil Mei Basa Loon"	Dilip Sen-Sameer Sen	Sameer	Babla Mehta
Jeena Marna Tere Sang	"Jab Nazar Band Thi"	Dilip Sen-Sameer Sen	Sameer	solo
Jeena Marna Tere Sang	"Chaha Hai Tumhein Chahenge, Saanson Mein Bas Jayenge"	Dilip Sen-Sameer Sen	Sameer	Kumar Sanu
Jeena Marna Tere Sang	"Dil Mein Hai Kya"	Dilip Sen-Sameer Sen	Sameer	Hariharan
Jeena Marna Tere Sang	"Aaj Dil Ki Baatein Keh Denge Hum Sabhi"	Dilip Sen-Sameer Sen	Yogesh	Babla Mehta
Jeena Marna Tere Sang	"Kal Maine Khuli Aankh Se Ek Sapna Dekha"	Dilip Sen-Sameer Sen	Ibrahim Ashq	Abhijeet Bhattacharya
Jeena Marna Tere Sang	"Kala Doriya"	Dilip Sen-Sameer Sen	Mahendra Dehlvi	solo
Jeena Marna Tere Sang	"Tere Liye Laya Hoon Main Lal Lal Chunariya"	Babul Bose	Ravinder Rawal	Mohammed Aziz
Junoon	"Prem Prem O Meri Dilruba"	Nadeem–Shravan	Sameer	S. P. Balasubrahmanyam
Junoon	"Waqt Kate Nahin Kat Ta Hai"	Nadeem–Shravan	Sameer	Vipin Sachdeva
Junoon	"Milte Milte Haseen Wadiyon Mein"	Nadeem–Shravan	Sameer	Vipin Sachdeva
Junoon	"Jo Mere Dil Mein Hai" (duet)	Nadeem–Shravan	Sameer	Vipin Sachdeva
Junoon	"Jo Pyaar Kar Gaye" (female)	Nadeem–Shravan	Santosh Anand	solo
Junoon	"Aaina Aaina Tu Bata De Zara"	Nadeem–Shravan	Rani Malik	solo
Junoon	"Deewaron Pe Likha Hai" (female)	Nadeem–Shravan	Surendra Sathi	solo
Junoon	"Deewaron Pe Likha Hai" (duet)	Nadeem–Shravan	Surendra Sathi	Vipin Sachdeva
Kaal Bhairav	"Nasha. hai Yeh Kaisa Nasha"	Pallav	Vijay Sinha	Tinnu Anand
Karm Yodha	"Ang Ang Mere Jaadu Jaage"	Ajit Varman	Nadira Babbar	Amit Kumar
Kasak	"Dekha Jo Husn Aap Ka"	Rajesh Roshan	Indeevar	Mohammed Aziz
Kasak	"Mili Tere Pyaar Ke"	Rajesh Roshan	Indeevar	Kumar Sanu
Kasak	"Ek Baar Pyaar Ka" (female)	Rajesh Roshan	Indeevar	solo
Maina	"Kaho Sajna, Mere Bina Kaise Rahe"	Naresh Sharma	Sameer	Abid Khan Langa
Maina	"Pyaar Kisi Se Kab Hota Hai"	Naresh Sharma	Sameer	Vipin Sachdeva
Maina	"Saanjh Savere Tu Yaad Aaye"	Naresh Sharma	Sameer	Suresh Wadkar
Maina	"Yeh Din Aur Yeh Raatein"	Naresh Sharma	Sameer	Suresh Wadkar
Maina	"Tum Meri Jaan Ho"	Naresh Sharma	Payam Sayeedi	solo
Maina	"Tum Jaan Ho, Dil Ho, Mohabbat Ho" (female)	Naresh Sharma	Payam Sayeedi	solo
Maina	"Kisi Ko Chaahun Tumhare Siva, Khuda Na Kare"	Naresh Sharma	Payam Sayeedi	solo
Maina	"Mera Shayar Hai Tu, Mera Nagma Hai Tu"	Naresh Sharma	Payam Sayeedi	Pankaj Udhas
Meera Ka Mohan	"Jab Jab Tujhko Dekhun"	Arun Paudwal	Indeevar	Kumar Sanu
Meera Ka Mohan	"O Krishna You Are"	Arun Paudwal	Indeevar	Kumar Sanu
Meera Ka Mohan	"Mere Liye Zaruri Pyar"	Arun Paudwal	Indeevar	Kumar Sanu
Meera Ka Mohan	"Rab Jaisa Roop Tumhara"	Arun Paudwal	Indeevar	Udit Narayan
Meera Ka Mohan	"Saari Duniya Pyari"	Arun Paudwal	Indeevar	Mohammed Aziz
Meera Ka Mohan	"Teri Chanchal Chanchal Aankhon"	Arun Paudwal	Indeevar	K. J. Yesudas
Meera Ka Mohan	"Tune Preet Jo Mujhse Jodi"	Arun Paudwal	Indeevar	Suresh Wadkar
Meera Ka Mohan	"Jab Se Tu Meri Zindagi Mein Aaya"	Arun Paudwal	Indeevar	Suresh Wadkar
Meera Ka Mohan	"Jai Jai Ram Ramaiya"	Arun Paudwal	Indeevar	solo
Mehboob Mere Mahboob	"Mehboob Mere Mehboob, Ghazab Ki Garmi Hai Teri Sanson Mein"	Raam Laxman	Noor Kaskar	Vipin Sachdeva
Mehboob Mere Mahboob	"Jab Rab Ki Ghar Mein Pyaar Ki Tasveer Ban Gayi"	Raam Laxman	Dev Kohli	Vipin Sachdeva
Mehboob Mere Mahboob	"Kya Yehi Pyaar Hai" (version 1)	Raam Laxman	Dev Kohli	Vipin Sachdeva
Mehboob Mere Mahboob	"Kya Yehi Pyaar Hai" (version 2)	Raam Laxman	Dev Kohli	Vipin Sachdeva
Mehboob Mere Mahboob	"Humein Phoolon Ki Tarah Dil Mein Saja Kar Rakhna"	Raam Laxman	Dev Kohli	solo
Mehboob Mere Mahboob	"Kyun Chhede Hum Ko Soniya"	Raam Laxman	Dev Kohli	solo
Mehboob Mere Mahboob	"Doli Chadh Diya Marian Heer Cheekhan"	Raam Laxman	Dilip Tahir	solo
Mehboob Mere Mahboob	"Chhup Chhup Ke Duniya Se Kab Mile"	Raam Laxman	Dilip Tahir	Vipin Sachdeva
Mera Dil Tere Liye	"Mera Dil Tere Liye" (female)	Babul Bose	Ravindra Rawal	solo
Mera Dil Tere Liye	"Ishq Leta Hai Aashiquon Ke Imtihaan"	Babul Bose	Ravindra Rawal	Suresh Wadkar
Mera Dil Tere Liye	"Mera Dil Tere Liye" (duet)	Babul Bose	Ravindra Rawal	Debashish Dasgupta
Mera Dil Tere Liye	"Pyar Agar Zurm Hai"	Babul Bose	Ravindra Rawal	Udit Narayan
Mera Dil Tere Liye	"Tujhe Kasam Hai Laila Ki"	Babul Bose	Ravindra Rawal	Udit Narayan
Mera Dil Tere Liye	"Tere Gore Gore Gaal"	Babul Bose	Ravindra Rawal	Mohammad Aziz
Mr. Bond	"Meri Jane Jana Mere Paas To Aao"	Anand–Milind	Sameer	Anand Chitragupt
Mr. Bond	"Wada Karen Chalo Le Lein Kasam"	Anand–Milind	Sameer	Abhijeet Bhattacharya
Mr. Bond	"Chhod De Pyare Kal Ki Fikar"	Anand–Milind	Sameer	Amit Kumar
Mr. Bond	"Handsome Man, Jab Se Dekha To"	Anand–Milind	Sameer	Annette Pinto
Mr. Bond	"O Mere Jaanam"	Anand–Milind	Sameer	solo
Mr. Bond	"Asha Nirasha To Jeevan Mein"	Anand–Milind	Sameer	solo
Mr. Bond	"Baadal Garje Bijli Chamke"	Anand–Milind	Anand Bakshi	Mohammed Aziz
Mr. Bond	"Jab Do Dil Milte Hain"	Anand–Milind	Majrooh Sultanpuri	Mohammed Aziz
Police Aur Mujrim	"Tum Din Ko Din Keh Do"	Bappi Lahiri	Anjaan	Udit Narayan
Police Officer	"Suno Suno Ji Mere Jaisa"	Anand–Milind	Sameer	Mohammed Aziz Kavita Paudwal
Pyar Bhara Khat	"Rimjhim Bars"	Krishnendu Das	Baluda	G. Shankar
Radha Ka Sangam	"Prem Hai Janmon Ka Sangam"	Anu Malik	Hasrat Jaipuri	Sukhwinder Singh
Radha Ka Sangam	"Kanha Kanha Kanha"	Anu Malik	Hasrat Jaipuri	solo
Radha Ka Sangam	"Banna Mera Aaya Hariyala"	Anu Malik	Hasrat Jaipuri, Prayag Raj, Shaily Shailendra	Suresh Wadkar, Nitin Mukesh
Rishta Ho To Aisa	"O Shama Tera Parwana"	Laxmikant–Pyarelal	Majrooh Sultanpuri	Shabbir Kumar
Sahebzaade	"Gore Gaalonwali Mil Gayi"	Laxmikant–Pyarelal	Hasan Kamal	Mohammed Aziz
Sanam Aap Ki Khatir	"Tere Daaman Ko Pakdoon"	Ajay Swami	Suroor Lucknowi	solo
Sanam Aap Ki Khatir	"Hum Aaj Yeh Khaate Hain Kasam"	Ajay Swami	Suroor Lucknowi	Suresh Wadkar
Sanam Tere Hain Hum	"Sanam Tere Hain Hum"	Bappi Lahiri	Mahendra Dalvi	Debashish Dasgupta
Sanam Tere Hain Hum	"Hathkadi Hathkadi"	Bappi Lahiri	Mahendra Dalvi	solo
Sanam Tere Hain Hum	"Sanam Tere Hain Hum" (sad)	Bappi Lahiri	Mahendra Dalvi	solo
Sanam Tere Hain Hum	"Saamne Baithe Raho" (female)	Bappi Lahiri	Mahendra Dalvi	solo
Sangeet	"O Rabba Koi To Bataaye"	Anand–Milind	Santosh Anand	Suresh Wadkar
Sangeet	"Sangeet Jahaan Hai Geet Wahaan Hai"	Anand–Milind	Santosh Anand	Suresh Wadkar
Sangeet	"Chali Aaiyo Radhe Rani"	Anand–Milind	Santosh Anand	Suresh Wadkar
Sangeet	"Saat Suron Ke Taar Ban Gaye"	Anand–Milind	Santosh Anand	Suresh Wadkar
Sangeet	"Ho Rama Haye Re"	Anand–Milind	Santosh Anand	Suresh Wadkar
Sangeet	"Chhote Chhote Taaron Se"	Anand–Milind	Santosh Anand	solo
Sangeet	"Aap Chahein To Humko"	Anand–Milind	Santosh Anand	solo
Sangeet	"Main Kangna Khankaun, Tum Geet Likho"	Anand–Milind	Santosh Anand	solo
Sangeet	"Main Tumhari Hoon"	Anand–Milind	Santosh Anand	solo
Sangeet	"Jo Geet Nahi Janma"	Anand–Milind	Santosh Anand	Pankaj Udhas
Shiv Mahima	"Jyitirlingo Ka Dhyan Karo"	Arun Paudwal	Nand Lal Pathak	Hariharan
Shiv Mahima	"Shiv Nath Teri Mahima"	Arun Paudwal	Naqsh Lyallpuri	solo
Shiv Mahima	"Main Toh Shiv Ki Pujarin Banungi"	Arun Paudwal	Mahendra Dalvi	solo
Shiv Mahima	"Milta Hai Sachcha Sukh Keval"	Arun Paudwal	traditional	solo
Shiv Mahima	"Saare Gaaon Se Dooddh Maanga"	Arun Paudwal	J. K. Setpal	solo
Siyasat	"Zindagi Mein Hai Pyaar Ka Din Bhi"	R D Burman	Hasan Kamal	Shailendra Singh
Sone Ki Seeta	"Ud Ud Jaa Ri Maina"	Kamal Anand	N/A	solo
Sone Ki Seeta	"Jai Jai Lakshmi"	Kamal Anand	N/A	solo
Sone Ki Seeta	"Ritu Basant Ko Jaane De"	Kamal Anand	N/A	Suresh Wadkar
Sone Ki Zanjeer	"Jee Chahta Hai Tera"	Anand–Milind	Sameer	Suresh Wadkar, Vinod Sehgal
Sone Ki Zanjeer	"Jeee Chahta Hain Tera"	Anand–Milind	Sameer	Fareeda Khan
Tahalka	"Dil Diwane Ka Dola Dildaar Ke Liye"	Anu Malik	Santosh Anand	Kumar Sanu, Babla Mehta
Tahalka	"Dil Diwani Ka Dola Dildaar Ke Liye"	Anu Malik	Santosh Anand	solo
Tahalka	"Eya Eya O"	Anu Malik	Santosh Anand	Anu Malik
Tahalka	"Aap Ka Chehra, Aap Ka Jalwa" (version 1)	Anu Malik	Hasrat Jaipuri	Mohammed Aziz
Tahalka	"Aap Ka Chehra, Aap Ka Jalwa" (version 2)	Anu Malik	Hasrat Jaipuri	Mohammed Aziz
Umar 55 Ki Dil Bachpan Ka	"Jab Se Mila Hai Mujhe Pyaar"	Dilip Sen–Sameer Sen	Yogesh	Kumar Sanu
Yaad Rakhegi Duniya	"Ae Hawa Aake Thaam Le Aanchal"	Anand–Milind	Sameer	solo

==== 1993 ====
Film	Song	Composer(s)	Writer(s)	Co-artist(s)
Aaja Meri Jaan	"Aaja Aaja Meri Jaan"	R D Burman	Sameer	S. P. Balasubrahmanyam
Aaja Meri Jaan	"Bechain Kar Diya Hai"	Amar–Utpal	Kulwant Jani	S. P. Balasubrahmanyam
Aaja Meri Jaan	"Maria Sun Le Mera Haal"	Amar–Utpal	Naqsh Lyallpuri	S. P. Balasubrahmanyam
Aaja Meri Jaan	"Aag Lage Sawan Ko"	Amar–Utpal	Ravinder Rawal	S. P. Balasubrahmanyam
Aaja Meri Jaan	"Shehar Ki Galiyon Mein Charcha Hai Aam"	Amar–Utpal	Yogesh	S. P. Balasubrahmanyam
Aaja Meri Jaan	"Aaja Sanam Warna Toh Hum Mar Jaayenge"	Amar–Utpal	Yogesh	S. P. Balasubrahmanyam
Aaja Meri Jaan	"Ek Tum Ho Jaisko Maine Chaha Hai Zindagi Mein"	Amar–Utpal	Yogesh	Pankaj Udhas
Aaja Meri Jaan	"Teri Nazar Se Meri Nazar"	Amar–Utpal	Rani Malik	solo
Aaja Meri Jaan	"Aa Tere In Gulaab Se Honthon Ko Choom Loon"	Amar–Utpal	Rani Malik	Vinod Rathod
Aaja Meri Jaan	"Paagal Dil Mera, Tumse Yeh Keh Raha"	Amar–Utpal	Rani Malik	S. P. Balasubrahmanyam
Aaja Meri Jaan	"Dil Wohi Dil Hai"	Amar–Utpal	Rani Malik	Mano
Aaja Meri Jaan	"Jhanjhara Leyade Mere Pairaan Vich Paade"	Amar–Utpal	Kulwant Jani	Mano
Aaja Meri Jaan	"Julie Julie Julie, Tu Ladki Nahin Mamooli"	Amar–Utpal	Manohar Iyer	Mano
Aaja Meri Jaan	"Hum Ashqon Mein Saara Jahan Ko Dubote"	Amar–Utpal	Dilip Tahir	Suresh Wadkar
Aaja Meri Jaan	"Mere Mehboob Ke Hum Tujhse Pyaar Karte Hai"	Amar–Utpal	Faaiz Anwar	Suresh Wadkar
Aaja Meri Jaan	"Novel Padha? Haan Padha"	Amar–Utpal	Maya Govind	Vinod Rathod
Aaja Meri Jaan	"Chahat Yeh Keh Rahi Hai"	Amar–Utpal	Maya Govind	Mohammed Aziz
Aye Mere Bekhudi	"Tam Tam Tam Tam"	Anil Mohile	Indeevar	solo
Aye Mere Bekhudi	"Main Hoon Zameen Tu Aasman"	Anil Mohile	Indeevar	Udit Narayan
Aye Mere Bekhudi	"Aye Mere Bekhudi"	Anil Mohile	Indeevar	Udit Narayan
Aye Mere Bekhudi	"Chhod Ke Saara Jahan"	Anil Mohile	Indeevar	Udit Narayan
Aye Mere Bekhudi	"Aise Baaji Tumhari Paayal"	Anil Mohile	Indeevar	Suresh Wadkar
Badi Bahen	"Bheegi Palak" (duet)	Laxmikant–Pyarelal	Majrooh Sultanpuri	Suresh Wadkar
Badi Bahen	"Bheegi Palak" (female)	Laxmikant–Pyarelal	Majrooh Sultanpuri	solo
Chor Aur Chand	"Sapnon Mein Aana, Dil Mein Samana"	Nikhil–Vinay	Yogesh	S. P. Balasubrahmanyam
Chor Aur Chand	"Lagne Laga Hai Mujhe Aaj Kal"	Nikhil–Vinay	Yogesh	S. P. Balasubrahmanyam
Chor Aur Chand	"Saanson Ka Kya Hai Pata"	Nikhil–Vinay	Yogesh	S. P. Balasubrahmanyam
Chor Aur Chand	"Baat Kya Hai Kaise Keh De"	Nikhil–Vinay	Yogesh	S. P. Balasubrahmanyam
Chor Aur Chand	"Sharmake Baadalon Mein Chanda Kyun Chhup Raha Hai"	Nikhil–Vinay	Yogesh	S. P. Balasubrahmanyam
Chor Aur Chand	"Mohabbat Mein Duniya Se, Hum Na Darenge"	Nikhil–Vinay	Yogesh	Mano
Chor Aur Chand	"Sau Baar Tumse Tumse Kaha"	Nikhil–Vinay	Yogesh	Mano
Chor Aur Chand	"Tere Bin Kahin Jiyara Laage Na"	Nikhil–Vinay	Yogesh	Kumar Sanu
Chor Aur Chand	"Jaanam Jaanam Tumko Sanam Chaha Teri Kasam"	Nikhil–Vinay	Yogesh	Udit Narayan
Chor Aur Chand	"Tere Bina Main Na Rahun"	Nikhil–Vinay	Yogesh	Kumar Kancha
Dharam Ka Insaaf	"O Meri Soniye"	Sukhwinder Singh	Nandi Khanna	Mangal Singh
Dil Apna Aur Preet Parai	"Shivji Ne Damroo Baja Ke"	Usha Khanna	Yogesh	Vinod Rathod
Do Dilon Ka Sangam	"Pyaar Do Dilon Ka Sangam Hai"	Milind Sagar	Faaiz Anwar	Mano
Do Dilon Ka Sangam	"Ab Tanhai Mujhe Har Pal Tadpaati Hai"	Milind Sagar	Faaiz Anwar	Vinod Rathod
Do Dilon Ka Sangam	"Chandni Khushboo Shabnam"	Milind Sagar	Faaiz Anwar	Vinod Rathod
Do Dilon Ka Sangam	Dekha Tha Usne Pyaar Se"	Milind Sagar	Faaiz Anwar	Vinod Rathod
Do Dilon Ka Sangam	"Mere Pyaar Mein Hain Woh Deewangi" (female)	Milind Sagar	Faaiz Anwar	solo
Do Dilon Ka Sangam	"Kal Ka Vaada Yaad Hai Mujhe"	Milind Sagar	Faaiz Anwar	solo
Do Dilon Ka Sangam	"Dil Bhool Nahin Sakta Tumhen"	Milind Sagar	Faaiz Anwar	solo
Do Dilon Ka Sangam	"Lete Hain Sab Naam Tera"	Milind Sagar	Faaiz Anwar	Mohammed Aziz
Do Dilon Ka Sangam	"Mere Pyaar Mein Hain Woh Deewangi" (duet)	Milind Sagar	Faaiz Anwar	Babul Supriyo
Ghar Aaya Mera Pardesi	"Chidiya Bole Chun Chun" (version 2)	Vijay Singh	Ravindra Peepat	solo
Ghar Aaya Mera Pardesi	"Ik Sukh Ka, Ik Dukh Ka Mausam"	Vijay Singh	Ravindra Peepat	solo
Ghar Aaya Mera Pardesi	"Jaanewale Bhool Na Jaana"	Vijay Singh	Ravindra Peepat	solo
Ghar Aaya Mera Pardesi	"Tera Naam Mera Naam"	Vijay Singh	Ravindra Peepat	Kumar Sanu
Ghar Aaya Mera Pardesi	"Roko Na Jaane Jaan, Ab Jaane Do"	Vijay Singh	Ravindra Peepat	Mohammed Aziz
Ghar Aaya Mera Pardesi	"Ghar Aaya Mera Pardesi"	Vijay Singh	Ravindra Peepat	Vipin Sachdeva
Ghar Aaya Mera Pardesi	"Pyari Pyari Surat Teri"	Vijay Singh	Ravindra Peepat	Vipin Sachdeva
Ghar Aaya Mera Pardesi	"Tujhe Dekh Ke Jeeoongi Tera Pyaar"	Vijay Singh	Dev Kohli	solo
Ghar Aaya Mera Pardesi	"Ni Main Saas Kutni"	Vijay Singh	Dev Kohli	solo
Hasti	"Meri Kasam Teri Kasam"	Anand–Milind	Sameer	Udit Narayan
Izzat Ki Roti	"Mausam Badle To Badle Pyar Na Ye Badlega"	Bappi Lahiri	Indeevar	Kumar Sanu
Izzat Ki Roti	"Chori Chori Pyar Mein Hai Jo Maja"	Bappi Lahiri	Anjaan	Kumar Sanu
Izzat Ki Roti	"Main Teri Ho Gayi, tu Mera Ho Gaya"	Bappi Lahiri	Anjaan	Mangal Singh
Izzat Ki Roti	"Teri Meri Baat Chali To Aisi Chali"	Bappi Lahiri	Anjaan	Amit Kumar
Izzat Ki Roti	"Chini Mini Chini Mini Meri Jaan"	Bappi Lahiri	Anjaan	Amit Kumar
Izzat Ki Roti	"Saara Din Saari Raat Teri Yaad Sataye"	Bappi Lahiri	Indeevar	solo
Izzat Ki Roti	"Rabse Bhi Pehle Honthon Pe Mere Sajan"	Bappi Lahiri	Dilip Tahir	solo
Izzat Ki Roti	"Rabse Bhi Pehle Honthon Pe Mere Sajan"	Bappi Lahiri	Dilip Tahir	Pankaj Udhas
Izzat Ki Roti	"Mera Sona Sajan Aaya"	Aadesh Shrivastava	Kulwant Jani	
Jaan Pe Khelkar	"Humse Jo Ho, Koyi Aisi Kaam Karana"	Ravindra Jain	Ravindra Jain	Mohammed Aziz
Jaanam	"Patte Patte Par Dil"	Anu Malik	Indeevar	Vipin Sachdeva
Jaanam	"Pagalpan Chha Gaya Dil Tumpe Aa Gaya"	Anu Malik	Faaiz Anwar	Vipin Sachdeva
Jaanam	"Mere Dil Ka Pata Tumhein Kisne Diya"	Anu Malik	Faaiz Anwar	Vipin Sachdeva
Jaanam	"Dil Kyon Dhadakta Hai, Kyon Pyar Hota Hai"	Anu Malik	Faaiz Anwar	Vipin Sachdeva
Jaanam	"Ek Zindagi Guzar Gayi" (Female)	Anu Malik	Faaiz Anwar	solo
Jaanam	"Teri Chahat Ke Siva Jaanam Meri"	Anu Malik	Faaiz Anwar	Amit Kumar
Jaanam	"Dil Jigar Ke Jaan Achchha Hai"	Anu Malik	Rahat Indori	Amit Kumar
Jaanam	"Maari Gayi"	Anu Malik	Qateel Shifai	Anu Malik
Kala Coat	"Zindagi Ka Safar"	Iqbal Gill	Aish Kanwal	solo
Kala Coat	"Rootho Na Yun"	Iqbal Gill	Aish Kanwal	Shabbir Kumar
Kala Coat	"Hum Toh Nainon Se Karte Hain Baat"	Iqbal Gill	Aish Kanwal	Kavita Krishnamurthy
Kasam Teri Kasam	"Mera Tere Bin Lagta Ba Jee"	Amar–Utpal	Naqsh Lyallpuri	Sonu Nigam
Kasam Teri Kasam	"Parody"	Amar–Utpal	Manohar Iyer	Babla Mehta, Sudesh Bhosle, Sonu Nigam
Kasam Teri Kasam	"Dil Tera Dhadakne Laga"	Amar–Utpal	Manohar Iyer	S. P. Balasubrahmanyam
Kasam Teri Kasam	"Gupchup Gupchup, Gumsum Gumsum"	Amar–Utpal	Gauhar Kanpuri	Mano
Kasam Teri Kasam	"Saawan Jo Aag Lagaye"	Naresh Sharma	Faaiz Anwar	Mano
Kasam Teri Kasam	"Neend Mujhko Aayi Nahin"	Naresh Sharma	Faaiz Anwar	S. P. Balasubrahmanyam
Kasam Teri Kasam	"Teri Aankhen Meri Manzil Ka Pata Deto Hain"	Naresh Sharma	Faaiz Anwar	Pankaj Udhas
Kasam Teri Kasam	"Tujhko Saanson Mein Basane Ki Kasam Khayi Hai"	Naresh Sharma	Qateel Shifai	Pankaj Udhas
Kasam Teri Kasam	"Mera Khwab Hai Mere Sanam"	Naresh Sharma	Manzur Saburi	solo
Kasam Teri Kasam	"Halchal Yeh Kaisi Halchal"	Naresh Sharma	Sameer	Kumar Sanu
Mahakaal	"Main Khushnaseeb Hoon Ki Tera Pyaar Paa Liya"	Anand–Milind	Kafil Azar	Kumar Sanu
Meherbaan	"Bol Gori, Bol Zara Itni Si Baat"	Dilip Sen-Sameer Sen	Mahendra Dalvi	Ila Arun
Meherbaan	"Aao Paas Aao, Nazren Milao"	Dilip Sen-Sameer Sen	Rani Malik	Vinod Rathod
Meherbaan	"O Mujhe Jaans Hai Piya Ke Gaon Mein"	Dilip Sen-Sameer Sen	Rani Malik	Vinod Rathod
Meherbaan	"Dheere Se, Chupke Se Dil Ne Liya Hai Tera Naam"	Dilip Sen-Sameer Sen	Rani Malik	Sonu Nigam
Meherbaan	"Agar Aasman Tak Mere Haath Jaate"	Dilip Sen-Sameer Sen	Rani Malik	Sonu Nigam
Meherbaan	"Rimjhim Rimjhim Tan Pe Mere Paani"	Dilip Sen-Sameer Sen	Dilip Tahir	solo
Meherbaan	"Tum Hriday Ke Devta Ho"	Dilip Sen-Sameer Sen	Maya Govind	Suresh Wadkar
Muqabla	"Nainon Ko Karne Do"	Dilip Sen-Sameer Sen	Maya Govind	Sonu Nigam
Muqabla	"Chhodo Mujhe Jaane Do"	Dilip Sen-Sameer Sen	Mahendra Dalvi	Sonu Nigam
Muqabla	"Dil Tera Hai Deewana"	Dilip Sen-Sameer Sen	Mahendra Dalvi	Abhijeet Bhattacharya
Muqabla	"Tere Dil Mein Jo Hai"	Dilip Sen-Sameer Sen	Mahendra Dalvi	Vipin Sachdeva
Muqabla	"Jisko Pooja Tha Is Dil Ne"	Dilip Sen-Sameer Sen	Mahendra Dalvi	solo
Muqabla	"Khanke Kangna, Sun More Sajna"	Dilip Sen-Sameer Sen	Tajdar Taj	solo
Muqabla	"Ek Ladki Ne Mujhe Jaadu Kiya"	Dilip Sen-Sameer Sen	Nawab Arzoo	Sonu Nigam, Abhijeet Bhattacharya
Muqabla	"Dekho Pyare Rut Kaisi Aayi"	Dilip Sen-Sameer Sen	Ibrahim Ashq	Suresh Wadkar
Muqabla	"Jaane Jaana Jaane Jahaan"	Lalit Sen	Dilip Tahir	solo
Pardesi	"Wallah Wallah Saare Gaaon Mein"	Anand–Milind	Sameer	solo
Pardesi	"Saathiya Mujhe Neend Na Aaye Aaj Kal"	Anand–Milind	Sameer	Suresh Wadkar
Pardesi	"Meri Toh Har Shaam Hai Tere Naam"	Anand–Milind	Sameer	Amit Kumar
Pardesi	"Pardesi Laut Ke Aana" (version 1)	Anand–Milind	Sameer	Kumar Sanu, Anup Jalota
Pardesi	"Sathiya Sun Le Pukaar"	Nikhil–Vinay	Yogesh	Debashish Dasgupta
Pardesi	"Hun Mainu Yaad Teri Aayi"	Nikhil–Vinay	Yogesh	solo
Police Wala	"Raat Bhar Neend Na Aaye"	Bappi Lahiri	Sikandar Bharti	Udit Narayan
Prateeksha	"Aao Duniya Ke Paar Chale"	Rajesh Roshan	Prayag Raj	Mohammed Aziz
Prateeksha	"Sukh Hai Toh Gaana Hai"	Rajesh Roshan	Prayag Raj	Mohammed Aziz, Boney
Prateeksha	"Hua Haseen Ho Tohfa"	Rajesh Roshan	Prayag Raj	Sudesh Bhosle
Pyar Pyar	"Ek Tere Hi Chehre Pe Pyar Aaya"	Nadeem–Shravan	Sameer	Kumar Sanu
Pyar Pyar	"Paas Hi Mera Ghar Hai"	Nadeem–Shravan	Sameer	Kumar Sanu
Pyar Pyar	"Elaan Yeh Karte Hain"	Nadeem–Shravan	Sameer	Mohammed Aziz
Sahibaan	"Sahibaan Meri Sahibaan"	Shiv–Hari	Anand Bakshi	Jolly Mukherjee
Sahibaan	"Is Mele Mein Log Aate Hain"	Shiv–Hari	Anand Bakshi	Jolly Mukherjee
Sahibaan	"Tu Kya Pyar Karega"	Shiv–Hari	Anand Bakshi	solo
Sahibaan	"Main Botal Nahin Sharab Ki"	Shiv–Hari	Anand Bakshi	solo
Sahibaan	"Are Jaane Wale"	Shiv–Hari	Anand Bakshi	solo
Waqt Ka Sikandar	"Dhak Dahk Dhadke"	Shankar–Jaikishan	N/A	Mohammed Aziz
Zakhmo Ka Hisaab	"Jeene Ke Liye Zindagi Ko" (female)	Rajesh Roshan	Anwar Sagar	solo

==== 1994 ====
Film	Song	Composer(s)	Writer(s)	Co-artist(s)
Aaja Sanam	"Bandhan Pyaar Ka, Mar Ke Bhi Chhute Nahin Sanam"	Kavita Paudwal	Gauhar Kanpuri	Manu Rajeev
Aaja Sanam	"Bheegi Bheegi Shaam Ne Jaadu Kiya Sajna"	Kavita Paudwal	Gauhar Kanpuri	Manu Rajeev
Aaja Sanam	"Tu Hi Mera Jaanam Jaani, Tu Hi Mera Pranaam"	Arun Paudwal	Gauhar Kanpuri	Manu Rajeev
Aaja Sanam	"Apni Mohabbat Kabhi Kam Na Ho" (female)	Arun Paudwal	Faaiz Anwar	solo
Aaja Sanam	"Humne Tumko Chun Liya, Nazar Nazar Ki Baat Hai"	Arun Paudwal	Hasrat Jaipuri	solo
Aaja Sanam	"Matthe Te Chamkan Waal Dulhe Raja Ke"	Arun Paudwal	Sikandar Bharti	solo
Aaja Sanam	"Pyaar Wala Rong Na Main Dil Ko Lagaoongi"	Arun Paudwal	Rani Malik	solo
Aaja Sanam	"Is Chand Ke Main Sadke Jo Noor Hai Zameen Ka"	Arun Paudwal	Rani Malik	Suresh Wadkar
Aaja Sanam	"Prem Ke Yeh Bas Dhai Akshar"	Arun Paudwal	Rani Malik	Vipin Sachdeva
Aaja Sanam	"Dhadkanon Ko Khabar Na Hone Di"	Arun Paudwal	N/A	Bhupinder Singh
Aaja Sanam	"Le Jaa Tu Challa, Nishani De Ja Tu Challa"	Arun Paudwal	Indeevar	Sudesh Bhosle
Deewana Sanam	"Kyun Itna Tadapta Hai"	Milind Sagar	Faaiz Anwar	Babul Supriyo
Deewana Sanam	"Chand Ki Roshni Kam Ho Gayi"	Milind Sagar	Faaiz Anwar	Babul Supriyo
Deewana Sanam	"Dekha Tha Usne Pyaar Se"	Milind Sagar	Faaiz Anwar	Vinod Rathod
Deewana Sanam	"Yeh Chandni Hai, Ishq Sona Hai"	Naresh Sharma	Bashar Nawaz	S. P. Balasubrahmanyam
Ghar Ki Izzat	"Bholi Surat Wala"	Amar–Utpal	Anjaan	Mohammed Aziz
Insaaf Apne Lahoo Se	"Jhoomungi Naachungi"	Laxmikant–Pyarelal	Saneer, Hasan Kamal, Dev Kohli	solo
Insaniyat	"Laal Kaghari Ni Tera Laal Kagharu"	Aadesh Shrivastava	Kulwant Jani	Vipin Sachdeva
Main Tera Aashiq	"Dupatta Tera Kale Rang Da"	Nikhil–Vinay	Yogesh	Udit Narayan
Main Tera Aashiq	"Aankhon Ke Kaajal Se"	Naresh Sharma	Deepak Sneh	Pankaj Udhas
Main Tera Aashiq	"Mere Khayal Mere Hi Dil"	Naresh Sharma	Rahat Indori	Babla Mehta
Main Tera Aashiq	"Yaar Mil Jaaye Mujhe"	Naresh Sharma	Dev Kohli	solo
Main Tera Aashiq	"Dil Tera Dhadakne Laga"	Milind Sagar	Manohar Iyer	S. P. Balasubrahmanyam
Main Tera Aashiq	"Dhatura"	Aadesh Shrivastava	Kulwant Jani	Vinod Rathod
Phir Wohi Awaaz	"Aa Jaao, Bulati Hai Tujhko Teri Manzil"	Kamal Kant	Raj Jalandhari	solo
Phir Wohi Awaaz	"Ek Vaada Raha Ae Jaan-e-Wafaa"	Kamal Kant	Raj Jalandhari	Suresh Wadkar
Police Inspector (dubbed)	"Dil Ki Baat Keh Doon Yaara"	Aadesh Shrivastava	N/A	Udit Narayan
Prem Yog	"Zindagi Chaar Din Ki, Rootho Na Sanam"	Bappi Lahiri	Babul Supriyo	Maya Govind
Prem Yog	"Yeh Dil Mein Rehne Wale Dil Se Nahi Nikalte" (Duet)	Bappi Lahiri	Sikandar Bharti	Kumar Sanu
Prem Yog	"Socho Socho"	Bappi Lahiri	Anjaan	Abhijeet Bhattacharya
Prem Yog	"Chhodo Nasha"	Bappi Lahiri	Anjaan	Hema Sardesai
Prem Yog	"Kora Dil Hai"	Bappi Lahiri	Nawab Arzoo	Vinod Rathod, Ila Arun, Aroon Bakshi
Sadhna	"Mere Adde Ke Peechhe"	Bappi Lahiri	Anjaan	Mohammed Aziz
Sadhna	"Jeena Hai Ab Humko Tere Liye"	Bappi Lahiri	Anjaan	Mohammed Aziz
Sadhna	"Aaj Se Pehle Kabhi Kisi Ne" (version 1)	Bappi Lahiri	Anjaan	Mohammed Aziz
Sadhna	"Aaj Se Pehle Kabhi Kisi Ne" (version 2)	Bappi Lahiri	Anjaan	Mohammed Aziz
Sangam Ho Ke Rahenga	"Tere Sanson Ka Mere Sanson Se Sangam Ho Ke Rahega"	Anand–Milind	Santosh Anand	Udit Narayan
Shabnam	"Tera Naam Likh Kar Haathon Pe" (version 1)	Anu Malik	Faaiz Anwar	Vinod Rathod
Shabnam	"Do Ajnabi Dil Ke Sahare Mil Ke Chale"	Anu Malik	Faaiz Anwar	S. P. Balasubrahmanyam
Shabnam	"Tera Naam Likh Kar Haathon Pe" (version 2)	Anu Malik	Faaiz Anwar	solo
Shabnam	"Chaha Tha, Chaha Hai, Chahte Rahenge"	Anu Malik	Rani Malik	solo
Shabnam	"Jaane Kyun Dekhta Hain Insaan Aaina"	Anu Malik	Rani Malik	solo
Shabnam	"Mere Dil Ka Taar Baaje Baar Baar"	Anu Malik	Rani Malik	S. P. Balasubrahmanyam
Shabnam	"Deewangee Mere Dil Pe Ab Yun Asar Laaye"	Anu Malik	Rani Malik	Vipin Sachdeva
Shabnam	"Ek Doosre Ke Bin Hum Hain Adhure"	Anu Malik	Rani Malik	Vipin Sachdeva
Shabnam	"Chhodo Bhi Yeh Gussa"	Anu Malik	Shaily Shailendra	Vipin Sachdeva
Shabnam	"Gungunaye Sanam Apna Ek Sk Pal"	Anu Malik	Qateel Shifai	Sonu Nigam

==== 1995 ====
Film	Song	Composer(s)	Writer(s)	Co-artist(s)
Adhuri Dulhan	"Ritu Basant Ko Jaane De"	Triveni–Bhavani	Aziz Hyderabadi	Suresh Wadkar
Adhuri Dulhan	"Dil Mera Har Ghadi"	Triveni–Bhavani	Aziz Hyderabadi	Suresh Wadkar
Adhuri Dulhan	"Jai Jai Lakshmi"	Triveni–Bhavani	Aziz Hyderabadi	solo
Bewafa Sanam	"Kinna Sona Tainu Rab Ne Banaya"	Nikhil-Vinay	Yogesh	Sonu Nigam
Bewafa Sanam	"Zindagi Vas Sajna Da Pyar"	Amar–Utpal	Rani Malik	solo
Chahat	"Teri Surat Nigahon Mein Phirti Rahe"	Shyam–Surender	Zameer Qazmi, Rani Malik, Satish, Madan Pal, Deepak Chaudhary	Nitin Mukesh
Chahat	"Jab Se Gair Bas Gaye Hain"	Shyam–Surender	Zameer Qazmi, Rani Malik, Satish, Madan Pal, Deepak Chaudhary	Nitin Mukesh
Chahat	"Pyaar Ke Mod Par Mil Gaye Ho Agar"	Shyam–Surender	Zameer Qazmi, Rani Malik, Satish, Madan Pal, Deepak Chaudhary	Nitin Mukesh
Chahat	"Jab Mere Saamne Chand Hai"	Shyam–Surender	Zameer Qazmi, Rani Malik, Satish, Madan Pal, Deepak Chaudhary	Nitin Mukesh
Chahat	"Nazar Milte Hi Tujhse Meri"	Shyam–Surender	Zameer Qazmi, Rani Malik, Satish, Madan Pal, Deepak Chaudhary	Babul Supriyo
Chahat	"Teri Kasam Teri Raahon Mein Aake"	Shyam–Surender	Zameer Qazmi, Rani Malik, Satish, Madan Pal, Deepak Chaudhary	Sonu Nigam
Chahat	"Mohabbat Mein Jeena, Mohabbat Mein Marna"	Shyam–Surender	Zameer Qazmi, Rani Malik, Satish, Madan Pal, Deepak Chaudhary	Udit Narayan
Chahat	"Na Dil Ko Chain Hain, Na Mujhko Qaraar Hai"	Shyam–Surender	Zameer Qazmi, Rani Malik, Satish, Madan Pal, Deepak Chaudhary	Udit Narayan
Chahat	"Ik Munda Mere Haan"	Shyam–Surender	Zameer Qazmi, Rani Malik, Satish, Madan Pal, Deepak Chaudhary	solo
Jai Maa Vaishno Devi	"Main Hoon Daasi Teri Daatiye"	Amar–Utpal	Bharat Acharya, Naqsh Lyallpuri	solo
Jai Maa Vaishno Devi	"Haath Jod Ke Khadi Hoon Tere Dwaar Meri Maa"	Amar–Utpal	Bharat Acharya, Naqsh Lyallpuri	solo
Jai Maa Vaishno Devi	"Aao Aaye Tere Bhawan"	Amar–Utpal	Bharat Acharya, Naqsh Lyallpuri	Sonu Nigam
Jai Maa Vaishno Devi	"Dharti Gagan Mein Hoti Hai"	Amar–Utpal	Bharat Acharya, Naqsh Lyallpuri	Suresh Wadkar
Mera Damaad	"Aaye Na Aaisa Waqt"	Babul Bose	Yogesh, Prem	solo
Mera Damaad	"Jhir Jhir Barse Aaj Gagan Se"	Salil Chowdhury	Yogesh, Prem	Amit Kumar, Shailendra Singh, Sabita Chowdhury
Pyaar Karnewale Kabhi Kam Na Honge	"Sun Baadal Yeh Bijli"	Lata Kalyan	Kumar Anjum	Mohammed Aziz
Pyaar Karnewale Kabhi Kam Na Honge	"Pyaar Karnewale Kabhi Kam Na Honge"	Lata Kalyan	Kumar Anjum	Mohammed Aziz
Pyaar Karnewale Kabhi Kam Na Honge	"Barsaat Mein Aa Kareeb Aa"	Lata Kalyan	Kumar Anjum	Mohammed Aziz
Pyaar Karnewale Kabhi Kam Na Honge	"Ek Do Teen Chaar"	Lata Kalyan	Kumar Anjum	Kumar Sanu
Raaj Drohi	"Dobara Tibara"	N. K. Nandan	N. K. Nandan	Udit Narayan
Shri Satyanarayan Vrat Katha	"Satyanarayan Narayan, Narayan Lakshmi Satyanarayan"	Kirti-Anuraag	P. K. Mishra	solo
Shri Satyanarayan Vrat Katha	"Satyanarayan Narayan Narayan"	Kirti-Anuraag	P. K. Mishra	solo
Shri Satyanarayan Vrat Katha	"Satya Hi Parmeshwar Hai"	Kirti-Anuraag	P. K. Mishra	solo
Shri Satyanarayan Vrat Katha	"Sachche Man Se Toh Bhi Pukare"	Kirti-Anuraag	P. K. Mishra	solo
Shri Satyanarayan Vrat Katha	"Maine Satya Ka Vrat Apnaya"	Kirti-Anuraag	P. K. Mishra	solo
Shri Satyanarayan Vrat Katha	"Jai Lakshmi Ramana"	Kirti-Anuraag	P. K. Mishra	solo
Shri Satyanarayan Vrat Katha	"Jai Jai Satyanarayan Swami"	Kirti-Anuraag	P. K. Mishra	solo
Shri Satyanarayan Vrat Katha	"Hey Narayan, Hey Jagdishwar"	Kirti-Anuraag	P. K. Mishra	solo
Shri Satyanarayan Vrat Katha	"Gaao Gaao Sakhi Sohar Gaan"	Kirti-Anuraag	P. K. Mishra	solo
Shri Satyanarayan Vrat Katha	"Bhakton Shraddha Se Le Lo"	Kirti-Anuraag	P. K. Mishra	solo

==== 1996 ====
Film	Song	Composer(s)	Writer(s)	Co-artist(s)
Aurat Aurat Aurat	"Rota Hai Fariyaad Karta"	Laxmikant–Pyarelal	Anand Bakshi	solo
Chal Kanvariya Shiv Ke Naam	"Chal Kanvariya Shiv Ke Naam" (version 1)	Surinder Kohli	Balbir Nirdosh	Sonu Nigam
Chal Kanvariya Shiv Ke Naam	"Kanwariya Kanwariya Shiv Se Mila De"	Surinder Kohli	Balbir Nirdosh	solo
Chal Kanvariya Shiv Ke Naam	"Hey Shiv Shankar Hey Abhayankar"	Surinder Kohli	Abhilash	solo
Chal Kanvariya Shiv Ke Naam	"Maata O Maata Suni Hai Maine"	Surinder Kohli	Rahul Kumar	solo
Durjan	"Pyaar Me Tere"	Sapan–Jagmohan	Dev Kohli	Amit Kumar
Jai Dakshineshwari Maa	"Ganga Kinare Darbar Hai Tera"	Aditya Paudwal	Suraj Ujjain	solo
Jai Dakshineshwari Maa	"Jai Maa Dakshineshwari Kali"	Aditya Paudwal	Suraj Ujjain	solo
Jai Dakshineshwari Maa	"Meri Pooja Kar Suwikar"	Aditya Paudwal	Suraj Ujjain	solo
Jai Dakshineshwari Maa	"Jaago Maa Heu Bhavani"	Aditya Paudwal	Bharat Acharya	solo
Jai Dakshineshwari Maa	"Jai Jagdishwari Maata"	Aditya Paudwal	Ravindra Jain	solo
Jai Dakshineshwari Maa	"Maiya Ki Duwari Pe Aane Ki Der Hai"	Aditya Paudwal	Ravindra Jain	solo
Jai Dakshineshwari Maa	"Namo Devi Anant Rupini"	Aditya Paudwal	N/A	solo
Jai Dakshineshwari Maa	"Shloka"	Aditya Paudwal	N/A	solo
Phool Bane Patthar	"Mujhe Teri Adaon Ne Paagal Kar Daala Hai"	Shyam–Surender	Nawab Arzoo	Udit Narayan
Phool Bane Patthar	"Main Jab Sochta Hoon Tumhe"	Shyam–Surender	Faaiz Anwar	Udit Narayan
Phool Bane Patthar	"Meri Jaan Tu Tu Tu"	Shyam–Surender	Faaiz Anwar	Abhijeet Bhattacharya

==== 1997 ====
Film	Song	Composer(s)	Writer(s)	Co-artist(s)
Ankhon Mein Tum Ho	"Hum Kahe Na Kahe"	Anu Malik	Anand Bakshi	Kumar Sanu
Ankhon Mein Tum Ho	"Meri Aankhon Mein"	Anu Malik	Anand Bakshi	solo
Ankhon Mein Tum Ho	"Sab Kahte Hai"	Anu Malik	Anand Bakshi	solo
Aflatoon	"Oye Oye Tere Si Ladki"	Dilip Sen–Sameer Sen	Anand Bakshi	Udit Narayan
Aflatoon	"Uee Maa Uee Maa Mar Gayi Re"	Dilip Sen–Sameer Sen	Anand Bakshi	Abhijeet Bhattacharya
Aur Pyaar Ho Gaya	"Koi Jaane Koi Na Jaane"	Nusrat Fateh Ali Khan	Javed Akhtar	Udit Narayan, Nusrat Fateh Ali Khan
Itihaas	"Dil Ki Kalam Se" (version 1)	Dilip Sen–Sameer Sen	Sameer	Hariharan
Itihaas	"Yeh Ishq Bada Bedardi Hai"	Dilip Sen–Sameer Sen	Sameer	Pappu A K
Itihaas	"Saathi Mere Tere Bina"	Dilip Sen–Sameer Sen	Sameer	Kumar Sanu
Chirag	"O Yaara O Yaara"	Rajesh Roshan	Anand Bakshi	Udit Narayan
Jaalsaaz	"Jaikara Jaikara, Mai Da Jaikara"	Dilip Sen–Sameer Sen	Ravindra Jain	Ravindra Jain
Mr. and Mrs. Khiladi	"Hum Total Fida Tum Pe"	Anu Malik	Dev Kohli	Anu Malik
Mr. and Mrs. Khiladi	"Akela Hai Mr. Khiladi"	Anu Malik	Dev Kohli	Udit Narayan
Naseeb	"Chura Lenge Hum Sab"	Nadeem–Shravan	Sameer	Kumar Sanu
Prithvi	"Hai Rabba"	Viju Shah	Deepak Chaudhury	solo
Prithvi	"Jis Ghadi Tujhko" (duet)	Viju Shah	Jalees Sherwani	Kumar Sanu
Prithvi	"Chand Aadhi Raat Hai"	Viju Shah	Azeez Jalandhar	Udit Narayan
Prithvi	"Prem Granth Mein Geet Hain"	Viju Shah	Madan Pal	Nitin Mukesh
Prithvi	"Rang Hai Pheeke, Ghata Kya Hai"	Viju Shah	Madan Pal	Sonu Nigam

==== 1998 ====
Film	Song	Composer(s)	Writer(s)	Co-artist(s)
2001: Do Hazaar Ek	"Yun Na Rootho"	Anand Raj Anand	Dev Kohli	Kumar Sanu
Angaaray	"Le Chalo Tum Jahan"	Sukhwinder Singh	Madan Pal	Hariharan
Bade Miyan Chhote Miyan	"Deta Hai Jo Re" (version 1)	Viju Shah	Sameer	Udit Narayan, Amit Kumar, Kavita Krishnamurthy
Char Dham	"Char Dham Ki Aarti"	Surinder Kohli	Nand Lal Pathak	Suresh Wadkar
Chhota Chetan	"Parody Song"	Laxmikant–Pyarelal	Javed Akhtar	Shabbir Kumar
Chhota Chetan	"Billi Boli Miyaoon"	Laxmikant–Pyarelal	Anand Bakshi	Shabbir Kumar
Devta	"Chunri Bana, Mujhe Odh Le"	Dilip Sen–Sameer Sen	Dev Kohli, Anwar Sagar, Satyaprakash	Udit Narayan
Devta	"Ek Toota Tara Hoon"	Dilip Sen–Sameer Sen	Dev Kohli, Anwar Sagar, Satyaprakash	Sonu Nigam, Hema Sardesai
Doli Saja Ke Rakhna	"Kissa Hum Likhenge"	A. R. Rahman	Mehboob	M. G. Sreekumar
Dulhe Raja	"Dulhe Raja"	Anand–Milind	Sameer	Vinod Rathod
Dulhe Raja	"Aayi Ban Ke Rut Mastani"	Anand–Milind	Sameer	Sonu Nigam
Dulhe Raja	"Ladka Deewana Lage"	Anand–Milind	Sameer	Udit Narayan
Ghar Bazaar	"Nach Kudiye Ni Zara Nach Kudiye"	Usha Khanna	Kulwant Jani	Mohammed Aziz
Gharwali Baharwali	"Nepal Ki Thandi Hawa"	Anu Malik	Nitin Raikwar	Udit Narayan, Anu Malik
Gharwali Baharwali	"Love Love Kar Le"	Anu Malik	Nitin Raikwar	Anu Malik
Iski Topi Uske Sarr	"O Dupatte Se Tere"	Anu Malik	Rani Malik	Udit Narayan
Kalicharan	"Saari Raat Sataati Hai"	Nikhil–Vinay	Shaheen Iqbal, Yogesh	Udit Narayan
Keemat	"Gair Se Aankh Ladaaye"	Rajesh Roshan	Indeevar	Udit Narayan
Main Solah Baras Ki	"Do Dilon Ki Dastaan"	Rajesh Roshan	Amit Khanna	Udit Narayan, Kumar Sanu
Major Saab	"Pyaar Kiya Toh Nibhana"	Anand Raj Anand	Anand Raj Anand	Udit Narayan
Major Saab	"Pyaar Kiya Toh Nibhana" (sad)	Anand Raj Anand	Anand Raj Anand	Udit Narayan
Mehndi	"Baba Ki Bitiya"	Babul Bose	Rani Malik	solo
Mere Do Anmol Ratan	"Titli Ke Pankhon Jaisi"	Rajesh Roshan	Mohan Sharma	Kumar Sanu
Pyaar Kiya To Darna Kya	"Chhad Zid Karna"	Jatin–Lalit	Sameer	Udit Narayan
Pyaar Kiya To Darna Kya	"O Sathiya, O Beliya"	Jatin–Lalit	Sameer	solo
Salaakhen	"Paagal Karna, Paagal Hona"	Dilip Sen–Sameer Sen	Sameer	Udit Narayan
Ustadon Ke Ustad	"Kya Hoga Allah Jaane"	Dilip Sen–Sameer Sen	Nawab Arzoo, Satyaprakash	Abhijeet Bhattacharya
Ustadon Ke Ustad	"Nigaahen Khul Ke Mila Le"	Dilip Sen–Sameer Sen	Nawab Arzoo, Satyaprakash	Mohammed Aziz
Ustadon Ke Ustad	"Ke Sohni Kudi Sab Nu Hai Jachni"	Dilip Sen–Sameer Sen	Nawab Arzoo, Satyaprakash	Bali Brahmabhatt

==== 1999 ====
Film	Song	Composer(s)	Writer(s)	Co-artist(s)
Daag	"Dil Diwana Na Jaane Kab Kho Gaya"	Rajesh Roshan	Sameer	Kumar Sanu
Daag	"Chehra Tera Chehra"	Rajesh Roshan	Sameer	Kumar Sanu
Daag	"Piya Lagi Lagan"	Rajesh Roshan	Sameer	Jaspinder Narula
Daag	"Dil Deewana Naa Jaane Kab (Female)"	Rajesh Roshan	Sameer	solo
Daag	"Pardesiya Itna Bata Sajna"	Rajesh Roshan	Sameer	Udit Narayan
Dahek	"Jab Se Tumhen Maine Dekha Hai"	Aadesh Shrivastava	Shyam Raj	Udit Narayan
Dil Kya Kare	"Do Dilon Ki Kahani"	Jatin–Lalit	Anand Bakshi	Udit Narayan
Hai Kaun Woh	"Pyaar Karke"	Paul	Kuku Prabhas	Mohammed Aziz
Hai Kaun Woh	"Mere Kadam Tere Pyaar Mein"	Paul	Kuku Prabhas	Mohammed Aziz
Heeralal Pannalal	"Tere Bin Zindagi"	Anand Raj Anand	Shaheen Iqbal	Udit Narayan, Anand Raj Anand
Hindustan Ki Kasam	"Is Paar Sarhad Ke"	Sukhwinder Singh	Anand Bakshi	Sukhwinder Singh
Hogi Pyaar Ki Jeet	"Main Hoon Tere Pyaar Mein"	Anand–Milind	Sameer	solo
Hu Tu Tu	"Nikla Neem Ke Tale Se"	Vishal Bharadwaj	Gulzar	Roop Kumar Rathod, Kavita Krishnamurthy
Hum Aapke Dil Mein Rehte Hain	"Hum Aapke Dil Mein Rehte Hain	Anu Malik	Sameer	Kumar Sanu
Hum Aapke Dil Mein Rehte Hain	"Zara Aankhon Mein Kaajal"	Anu Malik	Sameer	Kumar Sanu
Hum Aapke Dil Mein Rehte Hain	"Kasam Se Kasam Se"	Anu Malik	Sameer	Kumar Sanu
Hum Aapke Dil Mein Rehte Hain	"Hum Aapke Dil Mein Rehte Hain" (female)	Anu Malik	Sameer	solo
Hum Saath Saath Hain	"Hum Saath Saath Hain"	Raam Laxman	Dev Kohli	Kumar Sanu, Udit Narayan, Hariharan, Alka Yagnik, Kavita Krishnamurthy
Hum Saath Saath Hain	"Mhare Hiwda Mein Naache Mor, Ta Ta Thaiya"	Raam Laxman	R. Kiran	Kumar Sanu, Udit Narayan, Hariharan, Alka Yagnik, Kavita Krishnamurthy
Hum Saath Saath Hain	"Maiyya Yashoda, Yeh Teri Kanhaiya"	Raam Laxman	R. Kiran	Alka Yagnik, Kavita Krishnamurthy
Khoobsurat	"Aana Zara Paas To Aa"	Jatin–Lalit	Gulzar	Kumar Sanu
Khoobsurat	"Main Adhuri Si Ek Udasi Hoon"	Jatin–Lalit	Gulzar	solo
Lal Baadshah	"Mera Munna Jab Jawan Hoga"	Aadesh Shrivastava	Maya Govind	Udit Narayan
Lal Baadshah	"Dhano Ki Aankhen Sharabi Laage"	Aadesh Shrivastava	Shyam Raj	Sudesh Bhosle
Lal Baadshah	"Ishq Ki Aankhon Mein"	Aadesh Shrivastava	Gohar Kamla	Mohammed Aziz
Mann	"Khushiyan Aur Gham"	Sanjeev–Darshan	Sameer	Udit Narayan
Mann	"Chaaha Hai Tujhko"	Sanjeev–Darshan	Sameer	Udit Narayan
Mann	"Kyon Chhupate Ho"	Sanjeev–Darshan	Sameer	Udit Narayan
Mother	"Pardesi To Hai Pardesi" (part 1)	Dilip Sen–Sameer Sen	Sameer	Sonu Nigam, Roop Kumar Rathod
Mother	"Pardesi To Hai Pardesi" (female)	Dilip Sen–Sameer Sen	Sameer	solo
Mother	"Mother Mother Dear Mother"	Dilip Sen–Sameer Sen	Sameer	Kavita Krishnamurthy
Mother	"Ek Duni Do Do Duni"	Dilip Sen–Sameer Sen	Sameer	Udit Narayan
Mother	"Jiya I Want To Love You"	Dilip Sen–Sameer Sen	Sameer	Kumar Sanu
Rajaji	"Rut Nayi Nayi"	Anand–Milind	Sameer	Udit Narayan
Sautela	"Dil Hai Deewana Mera"	Tabun Sutradhar	Maya Govind, Dev Kohli	Abhijeet Bhattacharya
Sautela	"Sapnon Ki Rani Hai Deewani"	Tabun Sutradhar	Maya Govind, Dev Kohli	Abhijeet Bhattacharya
Sikandar Sadak Ka	"Kyun Mere Pyaar Ka Tum Imtehaan Lete Ho"	Dilip Sen–Sameer Sen	Nawab Arzoo, Maya Govind, Tabish Romani, Akhtar Indori	Udit Narayan
Silsila Hai Pyar Ka	"Padosan Ke Ghar"	Jatin–Lalit	Sameer	solo
Silsila Hai Pyar Ka	"Yeh Dil Deewana Hai"	Jatin–Lalit	Sameer	Kumar Sanu
Sirf Tum	"Pyaar Toh Hamesha Rahega" (female)	Nadeem–Shravan	Sameer	solo
Sirf Tum	"Pyaar Toh Hamesha Rahega" (duet)	Nadeem–Shravan	Sameer	Hariharan
Sooryavansham	"Kore Kore Sapne Mere" (version 1)	Anu Malik	Sameer	Kumar Sanu
Sooryavansham	"Kore Kore Sapne Mere" (version 2)	Anu Malik	Sameer	Kumar Sanu

=== 2000s ===
==== 2000 ====
Film	Song	Composer(s)	Writer(s)	Co-artist(s)
Aaj Ka Ravan	"Khanka Re Khanka"	Pappu–Pawan	Shyam Anuragi	Udit Narayan
Agniputra	"Tune Mujhe Pukara"	Nikhil–Vinay	Anand Bakshi	Kumar Sanu
Badal	"Jugni Jugni"	Anu Malik	Sameer	Sukhwinder Singh, Jaspinder Narula
Badal	"Yaar Yara Mere Yaaram"	Anu Malik	Sameer	Udit Narayan
Beti No. 1	"Chori Chori Aankh Ladi"	Viju Shah	Maya Govind, Dev Kohli	Javed Ali
Beti No. 1	"Dilruba O Phoolon Jaisi"	Viju Shah	Maya Govind, Dev Kohli	Udit Narayan
Beti No. 1	"Tune Jo Liya Mera Chumma"	Viju Shah	Maya Govind, Dev Kohli	Abhijeet Bhattacharya
Bulandi	"Bam Bhole Shankar Ji"	Surender Sodhi	Gauhar Kanpuri, Satish, Satyaprakash	Vinod Rathod
Bulandi	"Tum Sharmaati Kyun Ho"	Surender Sodhi	Gauhar Kanpuri, Satish, Satyaprakash	Sonu Nigam
Bulandi	"Humne Tumko Chun Liya Hai"	Viju Shah	Anand Bakshi	Kumar Sanu
Bulandi	"Mujhe Hichki Lagi"	Viju Shah	Anand Bakshi	Kumar Sanu
Deewane	"Jogiya"	Sanjeev–Darshan	Sameer	Sukhwinder Singh
Dhai Akshar Prem Ke	"Koi Taza Hawa"	Jatin–Lalit	Sameer	Babul Supriyo
Dhai Akshar Prem Ke	"Dhai Akshar Prem Ke"	Jatin–Lalit	Sameer	Babul Supriyo
Dhai Akshar Prem Ke	"Yeh Sama Yeh Nazare"	Jatin–Lalit	Sameer	Babul Supriyo
Dhai Akshar Prem Ke	"Hai Deewana Ye Ishq Mera"	Jatin–Lalit	Sameer	Babul Supriyo
Dhai Akshar Prem Ke	"Do Lafzon Mein"	Jatin–Lalit	Sameer	Babul Supriyo
Dhai Akshar Prem Ke	"Ek Haseen Ladki"	Jatin–Lalit	Sameer	Babul Supriyo, Sudesh Bhosle
Dhai Akshar Prem Ke	"Mere Mahi Bada Sohna"	Jatin–Lalit	Sameer	Abhishek Bachchan
Dhai Akshar Prem Ke	"O Mere Rabba"	Jatin–Lalit	Sameer	KK
Hadh Kar Di Aapne	"Phir Tote Se Boli Maina"	Anand Raj Anand	Anand Bakshi	Udit Narayan, Sudesh Bhosle, Vinod Rathod, Anand Raj Anand
Hadh Kar Di Aapne	"Turi Ruri Rappa"	Anand Raj Anand	Anand Bakshi	Mohammed Aziz, Vibha Sharma, Vinod Rathod, Anand Raj Anand
Jai Jwala Maa	"Teri Jyot Mein Pal Pal"	Surinder Kohli	Naqsh Lyallpuri	Suresh Wadkar
Jai Jwala Maa	"Tere Darshan Ko Aaye Hai"	Surinder Kohli	Dharmesh Sagar	Narendra Chanchal
Jai Jwala Maa	"O Maa Tu Chhupi Hai Kahan"	Surinder Kohli	Balbir Nirdosh	solo
Khauff	"Haye Haye Yeh Hawa"	Anu Malik	Mehboob	Vinod Rathod
Krishna Tere Desh Mein	"Dekh Tere Judaai Mein Kya Haal Hai"	Ravindra Jain	Ravindra Jain	Susheel
Krishna Tere Desh Mein	"Din Ke Ujale Mein Dil Na Laage"	Ravindra Jain	Ravindra Jain	solo
Kuch Dil Ne Kaha	"Saanu Tere Naal Pyaar Ho Gaya"	Lalit Sen	Bipin Chandra Chaugule	Udit Narayan
Kuch Dil Ne Kaha	"Mere Dil Pe Hath Rakh Do"	Lalit Sen	Bipin Chandra Chaugule	
Kuch Dil Ne Kaha	"Mere Sone Rab Ne Kinni Soni Cheez Banayi Hai	Lalit Sen	Bipin Chandra Chaugule	
Kuch Dil Ne Kaha	"Main Tujhko Yaad Aaunga"	Nikhil–Vinay	Anand Bakshi	
Le Chal Apne Sang	"Sach Kahoon Teri Kasam"	Raam Laxman	Dev Kohli	Udit Narayan
Le Chal Apne Sang	"Inamon Se"	Raam Laxman	Ravinder Rawal	solo
Mela	"Tujhe Rab Ne Banaya Hai Kamaal"	Anu Malik	Sameer	Udit Narayan
Mela	"Kamariya Lachke Re"	Rajesh Roshan	Sameer	Udit Narayan, Abhijeet Bhattacharya
Mission Kashmir	"Maaf Karo"	Shankar–Ehsaan–Loy	Rahat Indori	Vinod Rathod
Papa The Great	"O Rabba Mujhe"	Sajid–Wajid	Ajay Jhingran	Udit Narayan
Papa The Great	"Mausam Badal Raha Hai"	M. M. Keeravani	Sameer	Udit Narayan
Prince No. 1	"Sharmaane Lagi"	Mani Sharma	N/A	Kumar Sanu
Pukar	"Kismat Se Tum Humko Mile Ho"	A. R. Rahman	Majrooh Sultanpuri	Sonu Nigam
Pyaase Honth	"Raat Dhal Jaayegi, Baat Tal Jaayegi"	Laxmikant–Pyarelal	Rajendra Krishan	solo
Raja Ko Rani Se Pyar Ho Gaya	"Aao Sunen Lehron Se Dhule Nagma" (duet)	Jatin–Lalit	Javed Akhtar	Srinivas
Raja Ko Rani Se Pyar Ho Gaya	"Jis Ke Liye Sapnon Mein Tum Ho"	Jatin–Lalit	Javed Akhtar	Srinivas
Sant Gyaneshwar	"Jai Jai Govind Bhajo"	Nandu Honap	P. K. Mishra, Dharmesh Tiwari	Suresh Wadkar, Ravindra Sathe
Sant Gyaneshwar	"Prem Ke Sanche Mein"	Nandu Honap	P. K. Mishra, Dharmesh Tiwari	solo
Sant Gyaneshwar	"Krishan Kanhaiya"	Nandu Honap	P. K. Mishra, Dharmesh Tiwari	solo
Sant Gyaneshwar	"Kanha Re, Kanha Re"	Nandu Honap	P. K. Mishra, Dharmesh Tiwari	solo
Shikari	"Shikari Ne Shikar Kiya"	Aadesh Shrivastava	Dev Kohli	Udit Narayan

==== 2001 ====
Film	Song	Composer(s)	Writer(s)	Co-artist(s)
Aashiq	"O Mere Dholna"	Sanjeev–Darshan	Sameer	Udit Narayan
Aashiq	"Mohabbat Ke Din"	Sanjeev–Darshan	Sameer	Udit Narayan
Bhairav	"Meri Paan Ki Dukaan Agar Hoti"	Surendra Singh Sodhi	Satyaprakash, Gauhar Kanpuri, Satish Sharma	Abhijeet Bhattacharya
Chingari Aur Sholay	"Gali Gali Mein Shor Hua"	Anand–Milind	Onkar Verma, Khalid	Udit Narayan
Dil Churaya Aapne	"Ude Rang"	Suresh Wadkar	Naqsh Lyallpuri	solo
Dulhan Dilwale Ki	"Jaane Jaana Jeena"	Ramana Gogula	Deepak Choudhary	S. P. Balasubrahmanyam
Dulhan Dilwale Ki	"Hai Dil, Hai Yeh Dil"	Ramana Gogula	Deepak Choudhary	Kumar Sanu
Ek Aur Jung	"Chuniye Ni Chuniye"	Omkar Rana	Sudhakar Sharma	Kumar Sanu
Ek Rishtaa	"Ek Raja Hai, Ek Rani"	Nadeem–Shravan	Sameer	Mohammed Aziz, Sarika Kapoor
Farz	"Jadoo Hai Yeh Kaisa"	Uttam Singh	Sameer	Sonu Nigam
Farz	"Dhola Dhola"	Uttam Singh	Sameer	Sonu Nigam
Jaan Pe Khelenge Hum	"Jaadugari Teri Jaadugari"	Vaishnav Dev	N/A	Udit Narayan
Josh-e-Jawani	"Sun Bijli Yeh Baadal Hai Tete Pyaar Mein Pagal"	Sawan Kumar Sawan	N/A	Mohammed Aziz
Josh-e-Jawani	"Barsaat Mein Aa Kareeb Aa"	Sawan Kumar Sawan	N/A	Mohammed Aziz
Josh-e-Jawani	"Aaj Apne Milan Ki" (version 2)	Sawan Kumar Sawan	N/A	Mohammed Aziz
Josh-e-Jawani	"Aaj Apne Milan Ki" (version 2)	Sawan Kumar Sawan	N/A	Mohammed Aziz
Kyo Kii... Main Jhuth Nahin Bolta	"Hai Udd Gayi"	Anand Raj Anand	Dev Kohli	Sonu Nigam
Lajja	"Kalyug Ki Seeta" (part 1)	Anu Malik	Sameer	solo
Mitti	"Chori Chori Akhiyon Mein"	Ali–Gani	Qaiser–Ul–Jafri	Mohammed Salamat
Mitti	"Ishq Na Hota"	Ali–Gani	Qaiser–Ul–Jafri	solo
Shirdi Sai Baba	"So Jaa Re So Jaa Mere Raja"	Pandurang Dixit	Pandurang Dixit	solo
Tum Bin	"Tumhare Bina Kuchh Na, Chaahat Karenge"	Nikhil–Vinay	Faaiz Anwar	Udit Narayan
Tum Bin	"Dekhte Hi Dekhte"	Nikhil–Vinay	Faaiz Anwar	Abhijeet Bhattacharya
Tum Bin	"Chhoti Chhoti Raaten" (part 1)	Nikhil–Vinay	Faaiz Anwar	Sonu Nigam
Tum Bin	"Chhoti Chhoti Raaten" (part 2)	Nikhil–Vinay	Faaiz Anwar	Sonu Nigam
Yeh Dil Maange More	"Yeh Dil Maange More" (version 1)	Luv–Kush	Guddu Verma	Shankar Mahadevan
Yeh Dil Maange More	"Yeh Dil Maange More" (version 2)	Luv–Kush	Guddu Verma	Shankar Mahadevan
Yeh Dil Maange More	"Ek Haseen Humsafar"	Luv–Kush	Shabab Allahabadi	Babul Supriyo
Yeh Dil Maange More	"Yeh Pyaar Ka Jaadu"	Luv–Kush	Shabab Allahabadi	Babul Supriyo
Yeh Dil Maange More	"Chal Chal Mere Dil Chal"	Luv–Kush	Sahil Azmi	Babul Supriyo
Vaishnovi Maa Ki Mahima	"Oonche Parvat Pe"	Surinder Kohli	P. K. Mishra	Udit Narayan
Yeh Raaste Hain Pyaar Ke	"Mera Dil Ek Khali Kamra"	Sanjeev–Dardhan	Anand Bakshi	Kumar Sanu
Yeh Raaste Hain Pyaar Ke	"Jo Pyaar Karta Hain"	Sanjeev–Dardhan	Anand Bakshi	Kavita Krishnamurthy, Manohar Shetty

==== 2002 ====
Film	Song	Composer(s)	Writer(s)	Co-artist(s)
Ab Ke Baras	"Main Pyaar Mein Hoon	Anu Malik	Sameer	Shaan
Ab Ke Baras	"Pyaar Mohabbat"	Anu Malik	Sameer	Udit Narayan
Ab Ke Baras	"Pyaar Mohabbat (sad)	Anu Malik	Sameer	Sonu Nigam
Ab Ke Baras	"Aawara Dil (Club Mix)	Anu Malik	Sameer	Sonu Nigam
Awara Paagal Deewana	"Yeh Tune Kya Kiya"	Anu Malik	Sameer	Sonu Nigam
Bharat Bhagya Vidhata	"Hindustan Mera Imaan"	Hriju Roy	Mehboob	Shraddha Pandit
Bharat Bhagya Vidhata	"Vande Mataram"	Hriju Roy	Mehboob	solo
Dushmani	"Deewangi Humari"	Nikhil–Vinay	Jyoti Nagar	Abhijeet Bhattacharya
Dushmani	"Teri Aashiqui Mein Dil Toh Kya"	Nikhil–Vinay	Yogesh	Udit Narayan
Great Target	"Dil Ne Pukara O Jaanam"	Ghulam Ali	Rajiv Ranjan Singh	Udit Narayan
Hum Hain Pyaar Mein	"Kehte Raho Tum"	Nishad Vaidya	Yogesh	Babul Supriyo
Hum Hain Pyaar Mein	"Hum Hain Pyaar Mein"	Nishad Vaidya	Yogesh	Kumar Sanu
Hum Kisise Kum Nahin	"O Sapnon Ke Saudagar"	Anu Malik	Anand Bakshi	Sonu Nigam
Hum Kisise Kum Nahin	"Main Sohni Tu Mahiwal"	Anu Malik	Anand Bakshi	Sonu Nigam, Vinod Rathod
Hum Tumhare Hain Sanam	"Khoye Khoye Din Hai"	Daboo Malik	Praveen Bhardwaj	Sonu Nigam
Hum Tumhare Hain Sanam	"Hum Tumhare Hain Sanam"	Nikhil–Vinay	Sameer	Udit Narayan
Karz: The Burden of Truth	"So Gayi Hai Zameen" (female)	Sanjeev–Darshan	Sameer	solo
Kuch Dil Ne Kaha	"Main Tujhko Yaad Aaoonga"	Nikhil–Vinay	Anand Bakshi	Udit Narayan
Kuch Dil Ne Kaha	"Mere Dil Pe Haath Rakh Do"	Nikhil–Vinay	Anand Bakshi	Udit Narayan
Kuch Dil Ne Kaha	"Mere Sone Rab Ne"	Nikhil–Vinay	Anand Bakshi	Udit Narayan
Love 2002	"Hothon Pe Aa Raha Hai"	Ghulam Ali Chander	Suroor Lucknowi	Kumar Sanu
Maine Dil Tujhko Diya	"Dil Churane Lagi"	Daboo Malik	Praveen Bhardwaj	Sonu Nigam
Rishtey	"Apna Bana Na Hai"	Sanjeev–Darshan	Abbas Katka	Udit Narayan
Rishtey	"Tu Tu Dil Mein"	Sanjeev–Darshan	Abbas Katka	Udit Narayan
Shakti: The Power	"Mere Munne Raja"	Ismail Darbar	Mehboob	solo
The Truth...Yathharth	"Saawan Ki Padi Re Phuhaar" (female)	Murlidhar	Jalees Sherwani, Rashid Lakhnavi	solo
Tum Jiyo Hazaron Saal	"Mera Ek Sapna Tha"	Jatin–Lalit	N/A	Udit Narayan
Yeh Dil Aashiqanaa	"Dhak Chik Dana"	Nadeem–Shravan	Sameer	Kumar Sanu
Yeh Dil Aashiqanaa	"Utha Le Jaoonga, Tujhe Main Dholi Main"	Nadeem–Shravan	Sameer	Kumar Sanu

==== 2003 ====
Film	Song	Composer(s)	Writer(s)	Co-artist(s)
Aanch	"Sada Suhagan"	Sanjeev–Darshan	Sudhakar Sharma	Chandana Dixit
Aapko Pehle Bhi Kahin Dekha Hai	"Kuch Bhi Na Kaha"	Nikhil–Vinay	Sameer	Sonu Nigam
Aapko Pehle Bhi Kahin Dekha Hai	"Aapki Yaad Aaye To" (Happy)	Nikhil–Vinay	Sameer	Sonu Nigam
Aapko Pehle Bhi Kahin Dekha Hai	"Aapki Yaad Aaye To" (Sad)	Nikhil–Vinay	Sameer	Shaan
Ek Alag Mausam	"Usko Paane Se Pehle"	Ravi	Kaifi Azmi, Sushma Ahuja	solo
Ek Alag Mausam	"Har Taraf"	Ravi	Kaifi Azmi, Sushma Ahuja	solo
Ek Hindustani	"Aap Mujhe Achchhey Lagne Lagey"	Daboo Malik	Praveen Bhardwaj	Udit Narayan
Kaash...Aap Hamare Hote	"Hum Bhi Mohabbat Mein Deewane Hote"	Aadesh Shrivastava	Praveen Bhardwaj	Sonu Nigam
Mahima Kashi Vishwanath Ki	"Jai Jai Shiv Shambhu"	Ram Shankar	P. K. Mishra	Vinod Rathod, Lakhbir Singh Lakha
Mahima Kashi Vishwanath Ki	"Tum Kya Jaano, Tum Ko Apna"	Ram Shankar	P. K. Mishra	Vinod Rathod
Mahima Kashi Vishwanath Ki	"Mahima Badi Teerthon Mein Kaashi Vishwanath Ki"	Ram Shankar	P. K. Mishra	N/A
Mahima Kashi Vishwanath Ki	"Mere Shiv Ji Tum Kahan Ho"	Ram Shankar	P. K. Mishra	solo
Mahima Kashi Vishwanath Ki	"Shiv Aayi Main Tere Dwaar"	Ram Shankar	P. K. Mishra	solo
Mahima Kashi Vishwanath Ki	"Nagendra Hare"	Ram Shankar	P. K. Mishra	Sonu Nigam
Mahima Kashi Vishwanath Ki	"Puran Hua Vrat Solah Somvaar"	Ram Shankar	P. K. Mishra	Sonu Nigam, Lakhbir Singh Lakha
Paap	"Intezaar"	Anu Malik	Sayeed Quadri	solo
Paap	"Sun-e-Mera Dil"	Anu Malik	Sayeed Quadri	Udit Narayan
Pyaar Kiya Nahin Jaatha	"Pyaar Kiya Nahin Jaata"	Anand Raj Anand	Shyam Anuragi	Sonu Nigam, and Pandit Ajay Pohankar
Pyaar Kiya Nahin Jaatha	"Ho Jata Hai Ye Pyaar"	Anand Raj Anand	Praveen Bhardwaj	solo
Tumse Milke Wrong Number	"Jab Tak Tum Saamne Rahoge"	Daboo Malik	Praveen Bhardwaj	Kumar Sanu
Tumse Milke Wrong Number	"Jab Tak Tum Saamne Rahoge" (Part 2)	Daboo Malik	Praveen Bhardwaj	Kumar Sanu
Tumse Milke Wrong Number	"Kal Hum Jis Se"	Daboo Malik	Praveen Bhardwaj	Kumar Sanu
Tumse Milke Wrong Number	"Kabhi Kabhi Koi Chehra"	Daboo Malik	Praveen Bhardwaj	Babul Supriyo
Tumse Milke Wrong Number	"Dil Sunta Hai" (female)	Daboo Malik	Praveen Bhardwaj	solo

==== 2004 ====
Film	Song	Composer(s)	Writer(s)	Co-artist(s)
Aan: Men at Work	"Dil Se Dilbar"	Anu Malik	Sameer	Kumar Sanu
Aan: Men at Work	"Jab Tak Rahega"	Anu Malik	Sameer	Abhijeet Bhattacharya
Ab... Bas!	"Kabhi Bindiya Ban Ke"	Daboo Malik	Sameer	Kumar Sanu
Ab Tumhare Hawale Watan Saathiyo	"Kurti Malmal Di"	Anu Malik	Sameer	Kailash Kher, Sneha Pant, Sonu Nigam, Sudesh Bhosle
Ab Tumhare Hawale Watan Saathiyo	"Mujhe Pyaar Do"	Anu Malik	Sameer	Karsan Sargathia, Sonu Nigam
Garv	"Tera Hi Deewana Dil"	Sajid–Wajid	Jalees Sherwani	Kumar Sanu
Insaaf: The Justice	"Dekha Hai Maine Toh"	Nikhil–Vinay	Sameer	Udit Narayan
Insaaf: The Justice	"Nazar Ka Milana"	Nikhil–Vinay	Sameer	Udit Narayan
Insaaf: The Justice	"Tumse Milna"	Nikhil–Vinay	Sameer	Udit Narayan
Insaaf: The Justice	"Tujhe Pyar Itnai"	Nikhil–Vinay	Sameer	Sonu Nigam
Julie	"Hum Tumse Dil Laga Baithe"	Himesh Reshammiya	Sameer	Udit Narayan
Kaun Hai Jo Sapno Mein Aaya	"Kaun Hai Jo Sapno Mein Aaya"	Nikhil–Vinay	Sameer	Udit Narayan
Kaun Hai Jo Sapno Mein Aaya	"Tere Chehre Pe Marta Hoon"	Nikhil–Vinay	Sameer	Kumar Sanu
Kaun Hai Jo Sapno Mein Aaya	"Bheegti Aankhon Se"	Nikhil–Vinay	Sameer	Sonu Nigam
Murder	"Zindagi Is Tarah Se" (female)	Anu Malik	Sameer	solo
Muskaan	"Woh Ho Tum"	Nikhil–Vinay	Sameer	Sonu Nigam
Muskaan	"Nach Punjaban Nachle"	Nikhil–Vinay	Sameer	Sonu Nigam
Muskaan	"Ishq Hasata Hai"	Nikhil–Vinay	Sameer	Sonu Nigam
Muskaan	"Jis Din Teri Meri Baatein"	Nikhil–Vinay	Sameer	Udit Narayan
Muskaan	"Kabhie Jaage Soye"	Nikhil–Vinay	Sameer	Udit Narayan
Muskaan	"Jaaneman Chupke Chupke" (version 2)	Nikhil–Vinay	Sameer	solo
Rakht	"Ishq Bedardi"	Naresh Sharma	Deepak Sneh	Alka Yagnik
Shukriya: Till Death Do Us Apart	"Maine Poochha Kudrat Se"	Vishal–Shekhar	Sameer	solo

==== 2005 ====
Film	Song	Composer(s)	Writer(s)	Co-artist(s)
Ankhon Mein Sapne Liye	"Jai Durga Maata"	Nilu Niranjana	V. Vijay	solo
Dreams	"Nazar Ne Nazar Ko Payaam De Diya"	Sajid–Wajid	Jalees Sherwani, Rashid Lakhnavi	Babul Supriyo
Kalyug	"Thi Meri Dastan"	Anu Malik	Sayeed Quadri	Amit Sana
Kasak	"Chandni Hai Khoyi Khoyi"	M. M. Keeravani	Sameer	Lucky Ali
Koi Mere Dil Mein Hai	"Na Dil Ko Lagate, Na Hairaan Hote"	Nikhil–Vinay	Faaiz Anwar	Udit Narayan
Koi Mere Dil Mein Hai	"Mujhse Dosti Karoge"	Nikhil–Vinay	Faaiz Anwar	Udit Narayan
Koi Mere Dil Mein Hai	"Sharaadati Sharaarati"	Nikhil–Vinay	Faaiz Anwar	Udit Narayan
Koi Mere Dil Mein Hai	"Koi Mere Dil Mein Hai"	Nikhil–Vinay	Faaiz Anwar	Kumar Sanu
Lucky: No Time for Love	"Jaan Meri Jaa Rahi Sanam"	Adnan Sami	Sameer	Udit Narayan
Naam Gum Jaayega	"Us Ladki Pe Dil Aaya Hai"	Anand–Milind	Praveen Bhardwaj	Kumar Sanu
Naam Gum Jaayega	"Hame Tumse Hai Pyaar Kitna"	Anand–Milind	Praveen Bhardwaj	solo
Naam Gum Jaayega	"Kabhi Yeh Na Poochhna"	Anand–Milind	Praveen Bhardwaj	Udit Narayan
Zameer	"Tum Kitne Bechain Ho"	Nikhil–Vinay	Sameer	Sonu Nigam

==== 2006–present ====
Year	Film	Song	Composer(s)	Writer(s)	Co-artist(s)
2006	Jaane Hoga Kya	"Palken Utha Ke Dekhiye"	Nikhil–Vinay	Sameer	Udit Narayan
2006	Jaane Hoga Kya	"Dheere Dheere Dil Jo"	Nikhil–Vinay	Sameer	Udit Narayan
2007	Jai Jagannath	"Jai Maa Kamala, Maa Kamalini"	Akshaya Mohanty	Abhilash	solo
2007	Jai Jagannath	"Bejaan Phool Tune Maathe Sajaaya"	Akshaya Mohanty	Abhilash	solo
2007	Kuchh Khatta Kuchh Meetha	"Jo Na Hua Kabhi" (female)	Tabun Sutradhar, Sanjeev–Darshan	N/A	solo
2007	Miss Anara	"Na Koyi Jurm Kiya"	Mannishankar, Dilip Tahir	N/A	solo
2009	Karm Aur Dharam	"Mere Ghar Mein Biraaji Meri Maa"	Surya Raj Kamal	Kiran Misjra, Kunwar Juneja	solo
2009	Karm Aur Dharam	"He Maata Meri"	Surya Raj Kamal	Kiran Misjra, Kunwar Juneja	solo
2010	Ek Hi Raasta	"Nazrein Mila Chori Chori"	Mani Sharma	Anwar Sagar	Kumar Sanu
2010	Maalik Ek	"Sabse Pyaara Mera Sai Baba"	Anup Jalota	Rajesh Johri	Anup Jalota, Sumeet Tappoo
2010	Shraddha	"Chandni Ratiyan"	Dinesh Arjuna	Daur Saifee	solo
2010	Shraddha	"Nainon Ke Sapne Jaaye"	Dinesh Arjuna	Daur Saifee	solo
2010	Shraddha	"Kaise Samjhaoon Toge"	Dinesh Arjuna	Daur Saifee	solo
2010	Shraddha	Chhoti Si Apni"	Dinesh Arjuna	Daur Saifee	solo
2010	The Film Emotional Atyachar	"Chitka Hua"	N/A	N/A	Kumar Sanu
2012	The Real Life of Mandi	"Beti Hai Paraya Dhan"	Dinesh Arjuna	Deepak Sneh	solo
2012	The Real Life of Mandi	"Baali Umariya"	Dinesh Arjuna	Daur Saifee	solo
2013	Deewana Main Deewana	"Ek Haseenaa Ek Deewana"	Bappi Lahiri	Maya Govind	Udit Narayan
2017	Badrinath Ki Dulhania	"Tamma Tamma Again"	Tanishk Bagchi, Bappi Lahiri	Badshah, Indeevar	Bappi Lahiri, Badshah
2020	Shubh Mangal Zyada Saavdhan	"Kya Karte The Saajna"	Anand–Milind, Tanishk Bagchi	Majrooh Sultanpuri, Vayu	Zara Khan
2024	Vicky Vidya Ka Woh Wala Video	"Tumhe Apna Banane"	White Noise Collectives	Sameer Anjaan, Surendra Sathi, Rani Mallik	Kumar Sanu
2026	Dhurandhar: The Revenge	"Hum Pyaar Karne Wale"	Shashwat Sachdev, Anand–Milind	Qveen Herby, Sameer Anjaan	Udit Narayan, Qveen Herby
2026	Dhurandhar: The Revenge	"Tamma Tamma"	Bappi Lahiri	Indeevar	Bappi Lahiri
2026	O'Romeo	"Dhak Dhak"	Anand–Milind, Meghdeep Bose	Sameer Anjaan	Udit Narayan
2026	Pati Patni Aur Woh Do	"Dum Duma Dum (Reboot)"	Anand–Milind	Sameer Anjaan	Udit Narayan
2026	Pati Patni Aur Woh Do	"Jeena Nahin Mujhe"	Laxmikant–Pyarelal	Javed Akhtar	Amit Kumar
2026	Batwara 1947	"Kahan Chale Gaye Ho Ram"	A. R. Rahman	Javed Akhtar	Shaan

=== Hindi non-film songs ===
Year	Album	Genre	Song	Composer(s)	Co-artist(s)
1981	Sheetala Mata	Devotional	"O Maa Sheetla"	Sapan-Jagmohan	Mahendra Kapoor
1981	Sheetala Mata	Devotional	"O Meri Mata"	Sapan-Jagmohan	Mahendra Kapoor
1981	Sheetala Mata	Devotional	"Suno Suno Ji"	Sapan-Jagmohan	Chandrani Mukherjee
1988	Asar	Ghazal	"Dil Tod Ke Hanste Ho"	Pandit K. Razdan	Manhar Udhas
1988	Asar	Ghazal	"Teri Meri Ek Hi Manzil"	Pandit K. Razdan	Manhar Udhas
1988	Asar	Ghazal	"Haya Ko Kitni"	Pandit K. Razdan	Manhar Udhas
1988	Asar	Ghazal	"Kiye Jao Nafrat"	Pandit K. Razdan	Manhar Udhas
1988	Asar	Ghazal	"Yeh Aur Baat Hai"	Pandit K. Razdan	Manhar Udhas
1988	Asar	Ghazal	"Armaan Hamare Dil Mein"	Pandit K. Razdan	solo
1991	Hum To Pyaar Karenge	Indipop Romance	"Aise Hasrat Se Na Dekho"	Babul Bose	K. J. Yesudas
1991	Hum To Pyaar Karenge	Indipop Romance	"Ab Ke Baras Yeh Sawan Ki Jhadiyan"	Babul Bose	K. J. Yesudas
1991	Hum To Pyaar Karenge	Indipop Romance	"Lal Lal Chudiyan"	Babul Bose	Mohammad Aziz
1991	Hum To Pyaar Karenge	Indipop Romance	"Main Pyaar Banoon Tera Dilbar"	Babul Bose	Mohammad Aziz
1991	Hum To Pyaar Karenge	Indipop Romance	"Tere Gore Gore Gaal"	Babul Bose	Mohammad Aziz
1991	Hum To Pyaar Karenge	Indipop Romance	"Pyaar Agar Jurm Hai"	Babul Bose	Udit Narayan
1991	Hum To Pyaar Karenge	Indipop Romance	"Tujhe Kasam Hai Laila Ki"	Babul Bose	Udit Narayan
1991	Hum To Pyaar Karenge	Indipop Romance	"Ishq Leta Hai Ashiqon Ki Imtihaan"	Babul Bose	Suresh Wadkar
1991	Hum To Pyaar Karenge	Indipop Romance	"O Mitwa Door Woh Zameen Pe"	Babul Bose	Kumar Sanu
1992	Aashiyan	Ghazal	"Tum Ek Baar Mere Pyar Pe Yakeen To Karo"	Arun Paudwal	Pankaj Udhas
1992	Aashiyan	Ghazal	"Tere Khamosh Honthon Se Mohabbat Gungunati Hai"	Lalit Sen	Pankaj Udhas
1992	Aashiyan	Ghazal	"Aisa Bhi Ek Zamana Aata Hai Aashiqui Mein"	Lalit Sen	Pankaj Udhas
1992	Aashiyan	Ghazal	"Ho Sake To Jaroor Padh Lena Ye Mohabbat Ka Aakhri Khat"	Lalit Sen	Pankaj Udhas
1992	Aashiyan	Ghazal	"Zindagi Mein To Sabhi Pyar Kiya Karte Hain"	Lalit Sen	Pankaj Udhas
1992	Aashiyan	Ghazal	"Ye Phool Kaliyan Bahaar Khushboo"	Lalit Sen	Pankaj Udhas
1992	Aashiyan	Ghazal	"Pyar Ka Naghma Hoon Main To"	Lalit Sen	Pankaj Udhas
1992	Aashiyan	Ghazal	"Naam Hai Saanson Pe Likha Aapka"	Lalit Sen	Pankaj Udhas
1992	Aashiyan	Ghazal	"Tujh Bin Ji Na Payenge"	Lalit Sen	Pankaj Udhas
1992	Aashiyan	Ghazal	"Dhal Gaya Chand Gayi Raat"	Lalit Sen	Pankaj Udhas
1992	Aashiyan	Ghazal	"Sharminda Jis Se Chand Hai"	Lalit Sen	Pankaj Udhas
1992	Aashiyan	Ghazal	"Zindagi Naam Ko Hamari Hai"	Parvez Akhtar	Pankaj Udhas
1992	Aashiyan	Ghazal	"Tera Sitam Nahin To Qayamat Hai Zindagi"	Parvez Akhtar	Pankaj Udhas
1992	Aashiyan	Ghazal	"Raaz Ki Baat Keh Gaya Chehra"	Parvez Akhtar	Pankaj Udhas
1992	Aashiyan	Ghazal	"Toota Hua Dil Tere Hawale"	Parvez Akhtar	Pankaj Udhas
1992	Aashiyan	Ghazal	"Jahan Pehli Baar Mile The Hum"	Parvez Akhtar	Pankaj Udhas
1994	Ishq	Ghazal	"Zakhmo Ko Hawa Doge"	Chandan Dass	Chandan Dass
1994	Ishq	Ghazal	"Dosti Chahat Wafa"	Chandan Dass	solo
1994	Ishq	Ghazal	"Dost Milte Hain Yahan"	Saroj Nanda	solo
1994	Ishq	Ghazal	"Gham-E-Yaar Se"	Saroj Nanda	solo
1994	Ishq	Ghazal	"Mera Gaon Jane Kahan"	Saroj Nanda	Chandan Dass
1995	Shikhar	Ghazal	"Likh Ke Kagaz Pe Mera Naam Mitate Kyon Ho"	Nikhil-Vinay	Jaswant Singh Jasol
1995	Shikhar	Ghazal	"Gairon Se Kaha Tumne"	Nikhil-Vinay	Jaswant Singh Jasol
1995	Shikhar	Ghazal	"Pyar Ne Kaise Din Ye Dikhaye"	Nikhil-Vinay	Jaswant Singh Jasol
1995	Shikhar	Ghazal	"Aashiqui Jaisi Ibadat Nahin Karne Dete"	Nikhil-Vinay	Jaswant Singh Jasol
1995	Shikhar	Ghazal	"Teri Tasveer Ko Hum"	Nikhil-Vinay	Jaswant Singh Jasol
1995	Shikhar	Ghazal	"Sab Kuch To Mil Gaya Hai"	Nikhil-Vinay	solo
1995	Shikhar	Ghazal	"Humne To Bas Itna Jana"	Nikhil-Vinay	solo
1996	Pehli Nazar Mein	Indipop	"Pehli Nazar Mein"	M. M. Keeravani	
1996	Pehli Nazar Mein	Indipop	"Aao Na Tarsao Na"	M. M. Keeravani	
1996	Pehli Nazar Mein	Indipop	"Yeh Pyar Hai Dushman Dil Ka"	M. M. Keeravani	
1996	Pehli Nazar Mein	Indipop	"Bol Mere Darpan Mein Kaisi"	M. M. Keeravani	
1996	Pehli Nazar Mein	Indipop	"Chanchal Naina Tumhare"	M. M. Keeravani	
1996	Pehli Nazar Mein	Indipop	"Dil Dhadakta Hai To"	M. M. Keeravani	
1996	Pehli Nazar Mein	Indipop	"Yaad Aa Gai Jaise"	M. M. Keeravani	
1996	Pehli Nazar Mein	Indipop	"Tu Meri Gori Main Tera"	M. M. Keeravani	
1997	Pagla Kahin Ka	Indipop	"Sade Vehre Vich Shehnaiyan"	N/A	solo
1997	Pagla Kahin Ka	Indipop	"Phoolon Ki Rang Bhanwre"	N/A	M. M. Keeravani
1997	Pagla Kahin Ka	Indipop	"Dil Kahe Kabhi Haan Haan"	N/A	Udit Narayan
1997	Pagla Kahin Ka	Indipop	"Le Chalo Tum Jahan"	N/A	Hariharan
1997	Pagla Kahin Ka	Indipop	"Aaya Tha Churane"	N/A	Abhijeet Bhattacharya
1997	Pagla Kahin Ka	Indipop	"Bechain Thi Naina Mere"	Tabun Sutradhar	Kumar Sanu
1997	Pagla Kahin Ka	Indipop	"Parande Vich Dil Atka"	Anand–Milind	Lakhbir Singh Lakha
2000	Ishq Hua	Romantic	"Likh Ke Mehendi Se"	Nikhil-Vinay, Lalit Sen	solo
2000	Ishq Hua	Romantic	"Teri Kuchh Baten"	Nikhil-Vinay, Lalit Sen	solo
2000	Ishq Hua	Romantic	"Ik Baar Kehdo"	Nikhil-Vinay, Lalit Sen	solo
2000	Ishq Hua	Romantic	"Choodi Bhi Zid Pe Aayi Hai"	Nikhil-Vinay, Lalit Sen	solo
2000	Ishq Hua	Romantic	"Kya Hua Kya Hua"	Nikhil-Vinay, Lalit Sen	solo
2000	Ishq Hua	Romantic	"Mujhe Ishq Hua"	Nikhil-Vinay, Lalit Sen	solo
2000	Ishq Hua	Romantic	"Is Dil Mein Teri Yaadon Ki"	Nikhil-Vinay, Lalit Sen	solo
2000	Ishq Hua	Romantic	"Kaun Hai Woh"	Nikhil-Vinay, Lalit Sen	solo
2001	Shiv Stuti	Devotional	"Om Namah Shivay(Dhun)"	Gulshan Kumar	solo
2001	Shiv Stuti	Devotional	"Hey Shivshankar Bhole Baba"	Gulshan Kumar	solo
2001	Shiv Stuti	Devotional	"O Shankar Mere"	Gulshan Kumar	solo
2001	Shiv Stuti	Devotional	"Nisdin Pooja Karen"	Gulshan Kumar	solo
2001	Shiv Stuti	Devotional	"Ek Aankh Mein Suraj Sadha"	Gulshan Kumar	solo
2001	Bekhudi	Indipop	"Tumhen Dil Mein"	Lalit Sen	Babul Supriyo
2001	Bekhudi	Indipop	"Ankhon Se Ankhen"	Lalit Sen	Babul Supriyo
2001	Bekhudi	Indipop	"Pyar Tumse Karte Hain"	Lalit Sen	Babul Supriyo
2001	Bekhudi	Indipop	"Dhire Dhire"	Lalit Sen	Babul Supriyo
2001	Bekhudi	Indipop	"Raat Din Tere Khayal"	Lalit Sen	solo
2001	Bekhudi	Indipop	"Kahin Diya Jale"	Lalit Sen	solo
2001	Bekhudi	Indipop	"Kabhie Mujhse"	Lalit Sen	solo
2001	Bekhudi	Indipop	"O Sanam"	Lalit Sen	solo
2001	Bekhudi	Indipop	"Yadein Teri Yadein"	Lalit Sen	solo

=== Songs for television ===
Year	Album	Song	Composer(s)	Co-artist(s)
1987	Kacchi Dhoop	Title track	Vijay Singh	solo
2016	Naamkaran	"Dhoop Ka Ek Tukda Hoon Main"	Anu Malik	Kumar Sanu

== Marathi songs ==
Year	Film	Song	Composer(s)	Co-artist(s)
1974	Yashoda	"Ghumala Hrudayi Naad Ha"	Datta Davjekar	Solo
1976	Ha Khel Sawalyancha	"Aala Aala Wara"	Hridaynath Mangeshkar	Asha Bhosle
1977	Asala Navra Nako Ga Bai	"Asla Navra Nako"	Ram Kadam (composer)	Solo
1977	Asala Navra Nako Ga Bai	"Hi Kashana Dhundi Aali"	Ram Kadam (composer)	Jaywant Kulkarni
1977	Soyrik	"Baghta Baghta"	Dinkar Powar	Jaywant Kulkarni
1977	Banya Bapu	"He Gard Nile Megh"	Rushiraj	Vinay Kumar
1977	Naav Motha Lakshan Khota	"Mi Jalwanti"	Anil-Arun	Shailendra Singh
1977	Naav Motha Lakshan Khota	"Jhali Phule Kalyanchi"	Anil-Arun	Solo
1979	Ashtavinayak	"Pratham Tula Vandito"	Anil-Arun	Vasantrao Deshpande
1979	Ashtavinayak	"Aali Majhya Ghari Hi Diwali"	Anil-Arun	Solo
1979	Ashtavinayak	"Disate Majla Sukh Chitra Nava"	Anil-Arun	Solo
1979	Ashtavinayak	"Ooth Mukunda Ooth Sridhara"	Anil-Arun	Solo
1979	Javyachi Jaat	"Majhi Priya Hasavi"	Prabhakar Jog	Suresh Wadkar
1980	Satichi Punyaai	"Ashi Eka Satichi Thor Punyaai"	Prabhakar Jog	Solo
1980	Satichi Punyaai	"Sangu Kashi Priya Mi"	Prabhakar Jog	Suresh Wadkar
1980	Satichi Punyaai	"Bala Jo Jo Re"	Prabhakar Jog	Solo
1981	Sundara Satarkar	"Apar Ha Bhavsasagar"	Vishwanath More	Suresh Wadkar
1981	Are Sansar Sansar	"Kalya Matit Matit"	Anil-Arun	Suresh Wadkar
1981	Are Sansar Sansar	"Raja Lalkari Ashi De"	Anil-Arun	Suresh Wadkar
1981	Are Sansar Sansar	"Jo Jo Gate Zoka Dete"	Anil-Arun	Solo
1981	Mosambi Narangi	"Mi Mosambi Mi Narangi"	Vishwanath More	Uttara kelkar
1981	Kaivari	"Aamhi Chalawu Ha Pudhe"	Prabhakar Jog	Suresh Wadkar
1981	Kaivari	"Ghanshyam Sawala Smarata"	Prabhakar Jog	Solo
1981	Kaivari	"Premala Upma Nahi"	Prabhakar Jog	Suresh Wadkar
1981	Gondhalat Gondhal	"Dogh Lutuya Rang Bahar"	Vishwanath More	Suresh Wadkar
1982	Gosht Dhamaal Namyachi	"Guruvin Nahi Duja"	Ashok Patki	Ajitkumar Kadkade
1982	Ek Daav Bhutacha	"Mi Fasle Ga"	Bhaskar Chandavarkar	Solo
1982	Ek Daav Bhutacha	"Vishwalli Asuni Bhavti"	Bhaskar Chandavarkar	Shrikant Padgaonkar
1982	Maay Baap	"Pyaar Ek Rog"	Anil-Arun	Suresh Wadkar
1982	Maay Baap	"Lek Chalali Sasarla"	Anil-Arun	Suresh Wadkar
1982	Maay Baap	"Tuzya Sathi Pranacha Mee"	Anil-Arun	Solo
1982	Chandane Shimpit Ja	"He Chandane Pholaani"	Prabhakar Jog	Solo solo Suresh Wadkar solo Shrikant Padgaonkar
1982	Chandane Shimpit Ja	"Madhava Kuthe Guntale"	Prabhakar Jog	Solo
1982	Chandane Shimpit Ja	"Kadhitari Kuthetari"	Prabhakar Jog	Suresh Wadkar
1982	Chandane Shimpit Ja	"Ghadun Je Gele Te"	Prabhakar Jog	Solo
1982	Chandane Shimpit Ja	"Pritipudhe Kashache Mol"	Prabhakar Jog	Shrikant Padgaonkar
1983	Devata	"Dholkichya Talavar"	Ram Laxman	Solo
1983	Devata	"De Tali Mala"	Ram Laxman	Paresh Pewekarr
1983	Gupchup Gupchup	"Saang Mi Tujla Kay Deu"	Anil-Arun	Sudesh Bhosale
1983	Gupchup Gupchup	"Pahile Na Mi Tula"	Anil-Arun	Suresh Wadkar
1984	Navri Mile Navryala	"Nishana Tula Dislana" "Hi Navri Asli" "Sajni Mohini"	Anil-Arun	Suresh Wadkar; Sachin Pilgaonkar; Rani Varma, Kavita Krishnamurthy, Shailendra Singh
1984	Dhagala Lagli Kal	"Deva Hanumanta Jhawa Pawa"	Prabhakar Jog	Solo
1984	Kulswamini Ambabai	"Aai Jagdambe"	Vishwanath More	Suresh Wadkar
1984	Hech Mazhe Maher	"Ye Aboli Laaj" "Kalale Kahi Tula" "Aiyayo Aiyayo Chal Javooya"	Ashok Patki	Suresh Wadkar; Suresh Wadkar; Suresh Wadkar
1984	Maherchi Manasa	"Manajogtya sansarach daan" "hi ratra milanachi" "ogh mayecha ha kadhi"	Sudhir Phadke	Pushpa Pagdhare; Solo solo
1984	Mumbaicha Faujdar	"Satanavsan mala milala" "Marathmol gaan" "Ha Sagari Kinara"	Vishwanath More	Solo; Solo; Suresh Wadkar
1984	Chorachya Manaat Chandane	"Ghar Doghanche Gharkul Pakhranche"	Sudhir Phadke	Solo
1985	Ardhangi	"Champa chameli" "bala tujhyschsathi"	Ashok Patki	Vinay Mandke; Solo
1985	Nikhare	"Abhalala Sapan Sakhe Pritich" vatale tasech sundar sur mala sapadle	Bal Palsule	Mahendra Kapoor solo
1986	Gadbad Ghotala	"Surya Ugavato Nabhat"	Suresh Kumar	Suresh Wadkar
1986	Aali Lahar Kela Kahar	"Andhar rati shrungar karuni	Rushiraj	Solo
1986	Majha Ghar Majha Sansar	"Swargahuni Sunder Gharte" "Hasnar Kadhi Bolnar Kadhi" "Tuj Jojavite Govinda Gopala" "He Murliche Sur"; Drushta Lagnya Joge Sare	Arun Paudwal	Suresh Wadkar; Suresh Wadkar; Solo; Ravindra Sathe; Suresh Wadkar
1986	Tu Saubhagyavati Ho	"Gaau Sakhya Prit Gaani" "De Tali De Tali" "Kashi Mi Tula Sangu"	Iqbaal	Shabbir Kumar; Suresh Wadkar; Solo
1986	Khara Warasdar	"Dis aala bhagyacha" "Asach hota Manat"	Arun Paudwal	Suresh Wadkar; Suresh Wadkar
1986	Tujhyawachun Karmena	"Bhale bure je ghadun"	Suhaschandra Kulkarni	Solo
1987	Gammat Jammat	"Chori Cha Mamla" "Ashwani Ye Na" "Mi Re Tujhya Sangati Ne" "Mi Aale Nighaale"	Arun Paudwal	Sachin Pilgaonkar; Kishore Kumar; Solo; Solo
1987	Maza Pati Karodpati	"Tujhi Majhi Jodi Jamlee" "Tinak Dhin Tandana" "Krishna Krishna Nandkishora" "Raat Ashi Preet Ashi"	Arun Paudwal	Kishore Kumar; Solo; Solo; Sachin Pilgaonkar
1988	Saglikade Bombabomb	"Na Sangatach Aaj" "Mala Pariche Pankh Milale" "Thaamb Ga Sajani"	Arun Paudwal	Suresh Wadkar; Solo; Sachin Pilgaonkar
1988	Mamla Poricha	"Tujhe Geet Othi" "daha gavchi daha"	Ashok Patki	Suresh Wadkar; Anupama Deshpande, Bela Sulakhe
1988	Pandharichi Vaari	"Dharila pandharicha chor"	Bal Palsule	Solo
1988	Ashi Hi Banwa Banwi	"Kunitari Yenar" "Hridayi Vasant Phulatana"	Arun Paudwal	Uttara Kelkar, Suhasini; Suresh Wadkar, Sudesh Bhosale, Shailendra Singh, Sachin Pilgaonkar
1988	Vahini	"I Love You" "Raya Me Dete Tula"	Anil-Arun	Mahendra Kapoor; Mahendra Kapoor
1989	Bhutacha Bhau	"Mee Kashi Tula Re"	Arun Paudwal	Solo
1989	Aatmavishvas	"Sanga majhya Lekila" "Re man mi tula" "Aali jaag soniyachya"	Arun Paudwal	Solo; Suresh Wadkar; Sachin Pilgaonkar
1989	Pasant Aahe Mulgi	"De na majh pen" "sang aala ranga" "He ganraya sansari majhya labho tujhi re daya"	Rushiraj	Sudesh Bhosle; Sudesh Bhosle; Solo
1989	Rajane Wajawla Baja	"Mi phool ga tu mogra" "Sagar kinara" " tip tip paus"	Ashok Patki	Vinay Mandake; Suresh Wadkar; Solo
1989	Dost Majha Mast	"Sajna ra jeev jhala" "sonya re raja re" "kasa dost jhalas tu"	Suhaschandra Kulkarni	Suresh Wadkar; Solo; Solo
1989	Kalat Nakalat	"Hey Ek Reshami Gharate"	Anand Modak	Ravindra Sathe
1989	Gharkul Punha Hasave	Ye Rani Ye Na" "Kuni Ghayal Karnare" "Thamb Re Thamb Re Sab Hi Aik Re" "Kuthali Chahul Kuthale Baadal"	Arun Paudwal	Solo
1990	Eka Peksha Ek	"Ya Mandir Othatala" "Ye Jeevlaga Ye"	Arun Paudwal	Solo; Sachin Pilgaonkar
1990	Eija Bija Tija	"Bandh he reshamache"	Aruna Borkar	Suresh Wadkar
1990	Dokyala Taap Nahi	"Dhak dhak ga kalij katay he"	Bappi Lahiri	Sudesh Bhosle
1990	Changu Mangu	"Aiyo rama"	Arun Paudwal	Sachin Pilgaonkar
1990	Shejari Shejari	"Aala aala mauka" "Ek Mulga Tujhyasarkha"	Vishwas Patankar	Suresh Wadkar, Pradnya Khandekar; Vinay Mandake
1991	Upkar Dudhache	"Suru jahali hi premkahani" "been wajwit ja re" "Tujhyapasuni mi kasa" "visaru nako ladibala"	Anu Malik	Suresh Wadkar; Solo; Suresh Wadkar; Mohammad Aziz
1991	Aayatya Gharat Gharoba	"Hi premnagri" "Aytya Gharat Gharoba" "Yash chalun aale dari"	Arun Paudwal	Suresh Wadkar; Sachin Pilgaonkar, Kavita Krishnamurthy; Sachin Pilgaonkar, Kavita Krishnamurthy, Prashant Damle, Suresh Wadkar
1991	Halad Rusli Kunku Hasla	"Aai Bapachi ladachi lek"	Ram Laxman	Solo
1992	Vajwa Re Vajwa	"Hi yuga yuganchi naati" "Rahu kashi priya"	Ashok Patki	Suresh Wadkar; Suresh Wadkar
1993	Bharla Ha Malavat Raktan	"Hi Tujhi Majhi Preeti"	Amar Haldipur	Suresh Wadkar
1993	Aikav Te Navalach	"Sur Nave Sajle" "He Roop Tujhe Phoolrani" "Chal Ye Na Mithit Ghe Na"	Arun Paudwal	Solo; Suresh Wadkar; Suresh Wadkar
1998	Paij Lagnachi	"Dhol Ghumala"	Achyut Thakur	Solo
2000	Sattadhish	"Aai Bhavani de Mala" "tyanche vanchaja"	Achyut Thakur	Suresh Wadkar; Solo
2000	Sawai Hawaldar	"Namo re Nako javoo sajna" "He data nela jeev"	Shrikant Thakre	Solo; Suresh Wadkar
2001	Chimani Pakhar	"Kirnancha bandhun maal" "Majhya Gharach gokul" "sa re ga ma pa dha ni sa"	Achyut Thakur	Achyut Thakrey; Suresh Wadkar Solo
2005	Navra Maza Navsacha	"Vedshastramaji" "Chala na gade"	Jitendra Kulkarni	Solo; Sachin Pilgaonkar
2006	Sawal Majhya Premacha	"Udvin rang bahar" premachi dhundi aali	Achyut Thakrey	Solo; Suresh Wadkar
2006	Gruhlakshmi	"Tujhi Krupa Jali Devi" "Rang Haldicha Gorya Angi"	Achyut Thakur	Solo solo
2008	Sasar Majha He Mandir	"Sasar Majh He Mandir"	Nandu Honap	Solo

== Kannada songs ==
=== Film songs ===
Year	Movie	Song	Music director	Co-singers	Ref
1996	Surya Putra	"Jai Shanideva"	Rajan–Nagendra	Rajesh Krishnan	
1996	Surya Putra	"Sharanu Shaneshwara"	Rajan–Nagendra	Rajesh Krishnan	
1996	Jeevanadhi	"Kannada Nadina Jeevanadi"	Koti	S. P. Balasubrahmanyam	
1996	Jeevanadhi	"Navamasa Ninnanu"	Koti	Rajesh Krishnan	
2000	Preethse	"Holi holi"	Hamsalekha	K. S. Chitra, Rajesh krishnan, SPB	
2000	Preethse	"Sai Sai Preethsai"	Hamsalekha	Hariharan	
2000	Preethse	"Yarittaree Chukki"	Hamsalekha	Hariharan	
2000	Devara Maga	"Bendakaloora Pakka"	Hamsalekha	SPB	
2000	Devara Maga	"Vasantha Bhoomige"	Hamsalekha	Rajesh Krishnan	
2000	Krishna Leele	"Gokuladalli Krishnaleele"	V. Manohar	Anant Nag, Shivarajkumar	
2001	Nanna Preethiya Hudugi	"Yaro Neenu"	Mano Murthy	Hariharan	
2001	Nanna Preethiya Hudugi	"Nanna Preethiya Hudugi"	Mano Murthy	Hariharan	
2001	Nanna Preethiya Hudugi	"Baa Baaro"	Mano Murthy	Rajesh Krishnan	
2003	Kariya	"Ell Ellinda"	Guru kiran	solo	
2004	Sarvabhouma	"Karunaadina Koravanngi"	Hamsalekha	Hariharan	
2004	Sarvabhouma	"Saare Jahan Se Accha"	Hamsalekha	solo	
2013	Agamya	"Naa Innu Badukiralare"	Chinmay M. Rao	solo	

=== Private songs ===
Year	Album	Song	Music director	Co-singers	Ref
2003	Shiva Sthuthi	"Om Namah Shivaya"	Pankaj Bhat	Chorus	
2021	Bhakthara Bandhu Saibaba	"Darushana Madona"	Puttur Narasimha Nayak	Chorus	

== Tamil songs ==
Year	Song title	Movie	Music director	Co-singers
1999	"Poosu Manjal"	Kanave Kalaiyadhe	Deva	solo

== Telugu songs ==
Year	Film	Song	Composer(s)	Co-artist(s)
1991	Indra Bhavanm	"Chikkali Chikkali"	Bappi Lahiri	Mano
1991	Indra Bhavanm	"Love Love"	Bappi Lahiri	Mano
1991	Indra Bhavanm	"Yetu Choosina"	Bappi Lahiri	Mano
1992	Raktha Tharpanam	"Chikkali Chikkali"	Bappi Lahiri	Mano
1993	Sri Sai Mahima	"Sai Divya Roopam"	Adhithya Paudwal	S. Janaki, Kavita Paudwal
1993	Sri Sai Mahima	"Sai Deva Sai Deva"	Adhithya Paudwal	
1993	Sri Sai Mahima	"Sai Dhuni"	Adhithya Paudwal	
2000	Manasunna Maaraju	"Nenu Gaali Gopuram"	Vandemataram Srinivas	Udit Narayan
2000	Tirumala Tirupati Venkatesa	"Jhanak Jhanakre"	Vandemataram Srinivas	Udit Narayan
2005	Subash Chandra Bose	"Vande Maatharam"	Mani Sharma	S. P. Balasubrahmanyam

== Oriya songs ==
=== Film songs ===
Year	Film	Song	Composer(s)	Co-artist(s)
1997	Kandheyi Aakhire Luha	"Chulubuli Chulubuli Chehera" (duet)	Amarendra Mohanty	Sonu Nigam
1997	Kandheyi Aakhire Luha	"Sundura Ta Para"	Amarendra Mohanty	solo

=== Non-film songs ===
Year	Film	Song	Composer(s)	Co-artist(s)
1994	Suna Ellisee	"Suna Ellisee"		Kumar Sanu
1999	Kadambari	"Manato Kadamba	Saroj Nanda	solo
1999	Kadambari	"Kala Pata Pitha"	Saroj Nanda	solo
1999	Kadambari	"Mora Tantire Lagila"	Saroj Nanda	solo
1999	Kadambari	"Kalara Patara Pita"	Saroj Nanda	solo
1999	Kadambari	"Bainsira Sataswara"	Saroj Nanda	solo

== Nepali songs ==
=== Film songs ===
Year	Film	Song	Composer(s)	Writer(s)	Co-artist(s)
1988	Yug Dekhi Yug Samma	"Tin Pate Dada"	Sambhujeet Baskota	Kamal Thapa	
1994	Swarga	"Danda Pari Yo Mann"	Sambhujeet Baskota		solo

== Bhojpuri songs ==
=== Non-film songs ===
Year	Film	Song	Composer(s)	Co-artist(s)
1988	Kajri	"Ae Saajan Hum Mudri"	Sapan-Jagmohan	Mohammed Aziz
1988	Kajri	"Jhuru Jhuru Bahele Pavanva"	Sapan-Jagmohan	solo
1997	Sindur Daan	"Bhauji Bol Haldi Ke"	Surinder Kohli	solo
1997	Sindur Daan	"Angana Mein Beti Nahaali"	Surinder Kohli	solo
1997	Sindur Daan	"Dheere Dheere Ho Bhasur"	Surinder Kohli	solo
1997	Sindur Daan	"Aa Gailye Bas Dulha"	Surinder Kohli	solo
1997	Sindur Daan	"Dheere Dheere Karoon Sindoor"	Surinder Kohli	solo
1997	Sindur Daan	"Chumeli Bhabhi Dildar"	Surinder Kohli	solo
1997	Sindur Daan	"Ab Lava Mila Dihle"	Surinder Kohli	solo
1997	Sindur Daan	"Ab Aa Gayi Le Doliya"	Surinder Kohli	solo

=== Film songs ===
Year	Film	Song	Composer(s)	Co-artist(s)
1984	Thakurayeen	Jab Paniya Jabania Ke	Chand Pardesi	Suresh Wadkar
1984	Thakurayeen	Aaja Aaja Raja Kareja Mein	Chand Pardesi	Suresh Wadkar
1984	Thakurayeen	Lave Ke Love Par Na	Chand Pardesi	Dilraj Kaur
1987	Pyari Dulhaniya	"Hamaar Piyava Hamake Kora Uthave"	Sapan-Jagmohan	Mohammed Aziz
1987	Pyari Dulhaniya	"Hum Aaili Sarniya Tohar"	Sapan-Jagmohan	solo
1987	Pyari Dulhaniya	"Bol Bol Babua Ji Bol"	Sapan-Jagmohan	solo
1987	Pyari Dulhaniya	"O Baanki Dhobiniya"	Sapan-Jagmohan	Kavita Krishnamurthy
1988	Dagabaz Balma	"Kabhiyo Piccha Na"	Lakshman Shahabadi	solo
1988	Dagabaz Balma	"Pyar Kaili To Dar Kono"	Lakshman Shahabadi	Suresh Wadkar
1988	Dagabaz Balma	"Khul Ke Pyar Kari Ja"	Lakshman Shahabadi	Suresh Wadkar
1988	Dagabaz Balma	"Jayiyo Re Chanda Jayiyo"	Lakshman Shahabadi	Suresh Wadkar
1988	Dagabaz Balma	"Ae Ho Dagabaz Balma"	Lakshman Shahabadi	solo
2003	Ganga Jaisan Mai Hamaar	"Hamaar Dunu Babua"	Rakesh Gupta	Solo
2005	Kab Hoi Gavna Hamaar	"Duara Per Aail Baraat"	Nikhil-Vinay	Shreya Ghoshal, Khushboo Jain
2005	Kangna Khanke Piya Ke Angna	"Humke Tohse Kuchh Ta Bhail"	K.Ratnesh	Udit Narayan
2005	Kangna Khanke Piya Ke Angna	"Kangna Khanke Piya Ke Angna"	K.Ratnesh	Poornima
2006	Uthaile Ghunghta Chand Dekh Le	"Uthaile Ghunghta Chand Dekh Le"	Rajesh Gupta	Udit Narayan
2006	Pyaar Ke Bandhan	"Pyaar Ke Bandhan"	Rajesh Gupta	Udit Narayan
2006	Pyaar Ke Bandhan	"Kaise Karab Shaadi Tohse"	Rajesh Gupta	Manoj Tiwari

== Punjabi songs ==
=== Non-film songs ===
Year	Album	Song	Composer(s)	Co-artist(s)
1991	Na Dil Mang Ve	"Na Dil Mang Ve"	Channi Singh	Channi Singh
1991	Na Dil Mang Ve	"Lathe Di Chadar"	Channi Singh	Channi Singh
1991	Na Dil Mang Ve	"Been Wale Jogi Tainu"	Channi Singh	Channi Singh
1991	Na Dil Mang Ve	"Mundri Char De Ve"	Channi Singh	solo

=== Film songs ===
Year	Film	Song	Composer(s)	Co-artist(s)
1997	Muqaddar	"Rangde"	Sukhwinder Singh	
2002	Jee Aayan Nu	"Aksar Lok"	Jaidev Kumar	Harbhajan Mann
2002	Jee Aayan Nu	"Na Eh Hasda Ae" (sad version)	Jaidev Kumar	Harbhajan Mann
2007	Sajna Ve Sajna	"Mehar Karin Mere Utte"	Bally Sagoo	

== Manipuri songs ==
Year	Film	Song	Composer(s)	Co-artist(s)
1993	Madhabee	"Chakliba Lammei"	S. Tijendra	solo

== Gujarati songs ==
Year	Film	Song	Composer(s)	Co-artist(s)
1976	Daku Rani Ganga	"Chandni Raate"	Dilip Dholakia	Mukesh

== Maithili Songs ==
=== Non Film Songs ===
Year	Album	Song	Composer(s)	Co-artist(s)
1997	Doliya Kahaar	"Baba Juawa Khelan Tony"	Sunil Chhaila Bihari	Sunil Chhaila Bihari
1997	Doliya Kahaar	"Lagni Chidaiya Lagan Le Le"	Sunil Chhaila Bihari	Sunil Chhaila Bihari
1997	Doliya Kahaar	"Ubtan Ke Ailay Bahaar"	Sunil Chhaila Bihari	Sunil Chhaila Bihari
1997	Doliya Kahaar	"Kahan Se Laylho Ho Baba"	Sunil Chhaila Bihari	Sunil Chhaila Bihari
1997	Doliya Kahaar	"Ghar Se Nikallaiy Amma"	Sunil Chhaila Bihari	Sunil Chhaila Bihari
1997	Doliya Kahaar	"Baba Hare Hare Baswa Kataai"	Sunil Chhaila Bihari	Sunil Chhaila Bihari
1997	Doliya Kahaar	"Penihayo Aapan Baba Dhoti"	Sunil Chhaila Bihari	Sunil Chhaila Bihari
1997	Doliya Kahaar	"Hum Mangilai Gorka Gorka"	Sunil Chhaila Bihari	Sunil Chhaila Bihari
1997	Doliya Kahaar	"Dhaan Kutoa Ho Dulha"	Sunil Chhaila Bihari	Sunil Chhaila Bihari
1997	Doliya Kahaar	"Kahe Laylho Doliya Kahaar"	Sunil Chhaila Bihari	Sunil Chhaila Bihari
1999	Beti Chalal Sasural	"Lowa Gelay Jhowa Kaatey"	Sunil Chhaila Bihari	solo
1999	Beti Chalal Sasural	"Swagat Mein Gaari"	Sunil Chhaila Bihari	solo
1999	Beti Chalal Sasural	"Kariyo Sindur Daan Dulha Ji"	Sunil Chhaila Bihari	Sunil Chhaila Bihari
2001	Lagan Bahaar	"Chalni Ke Chalal Dulha"	Sunil Chhaila Bihari	Sunil Chhaila Bihari
2001	Lagan Bahaar	"Chum Chum Chumaboa Sakhi"	Sunil Chhaila Bihari	solo
2002	Palki Pe Hoke Sawaar	"Madva Niche Chori Hoyto Ho"	Sunil Chhaila Bihari	Sunil Chhaila Bihari, Shailaja, Manisha, Priya
2002	Palki Pe Hoke Sawaar	"Maati Kodey Geloa Hum (Matkor)"	Sunil Chhaila Bihari	Sunil Chhaila Bihari, Shailaja, Manisha, Priya
2002	Palki Pe Hoke Sawaar	"Maati Ke Khapri Mein Laavo (Laava Bhunjai)"	Sunil Chhaila Bihari	Sunil Chhaila Bihari, Shailaja, Manisha, Priya
2002	Palki Pe Hoke Sawaar	"Humar Dulri Mein Kayle (Dhovin Suhag)"	Sunil Chhaila Bihari	Sunil Chhaila Bihari, Shailaja, Manisha, Priya
2002	Palki Pe Hoke Sawaar	"Nae Bahey Purva Basat (Parichhan)"	Sunil Chhaila Bihari	Sunil Chhaila Bihari, Shailaja, Manisha, Priya
2002	Palki Pe Hoke Sawaar	"Pandi Ji Gel Kharihan (Pandit Gali)"	Sunil Chhaila Bihari	Sunil Chhaila Bihari, Shailaja, Manisha, Priya
2002	Palki Pe Hoke Sawaar	"Hum Tera Dali Pe Panchhi (Kanyadan)"	Sunil Chhaila Bihari	Sunil Chhaila Bihari, Shailaja, Manisha, Priya
2002	Palki Pe Hoke Sawaar	"Bajaao Bhaiya Dholi (Sandhi Gali)"	Sunil Chhaila Bihari	Sunil Chhaila Bihari, Shailaja, Manisha, Priya
2002	Palki Pe Hoke Sawaar	"Suney Rahiyo Aho Samdhi (Samdhi Gali)"	Sunil Chhaila Bihari	Sunil Chhaila Bihari, Shailaja, Manisha, Priya
2002	Palki Pe Hoke Sawaar	"Paalki Pe Hoke Sawar (Vidaayi Geet)"	Sunil Chhaila Bihari	Sunil Chhaila Bihari, Shailaja, Manisha, Priya
2005	Bitiya Badi Sukumar	"Baba Ji Ke Dware Par"	Sunil Chhaila Bihari	Sunil Chhaila Bihari
2005	Bitiya Badi Sukumar	"Aawen Aawen Re Kaga Saguniya"	Sunil Chhaila Bihari	Sunil Chhaila Bihari
2005	Bitiya Badi Sukumar	"Anmol Bol Re Moyya"	Sunil Chhaila Bihari	Sunil Chhaila Bihari
2005	Bitiya Badi Sukumar	"Koun Chadhlan Ghachi"	Sunil Chhaila Bihari	Sunil Chhaila Bihari
2005	Bitiya Badi Sukumar	"Ghodwa Chadhi Ablahe"	Sunil Chhaila Bihari	Sunil Chhaila Bihari
2005	Bitiya Badi Sukumar	"Maye He Dulha Ke Gaye"	Sunil Chhaila Bihari	Sunil Chhaila Bihari
2005	Bitiya Badi Sukumar	"Chitchorwa Aaj Wanholan"	Sunil Chhaila Bihari	Sunil Chhaila Bihari
2005	Bitiya Badi Sukumar	"Baba Dhiyan Karoon Daan"	Sunil Chhaila Bihari	Sunil Chhaila Bihari
2005	Bitiya Badi Sukumar	"Hare Hare Kohbar Mein"	Sunil Chhaila Bihari	Sunil Chhaila Bihari
2005	Bitiya Badi Sukumar	"Beti Haye Ehi Se"	Sunil Chhaila Bihari	Sunil Chhaila Bihari
