= Debu Deodhar =

Indian film cinematographer

- Born: 1948; Pune, Maharashtra, India
- Died: 1 September 2010 (age 62); Mumbai, Maharashtra, India
- Other names: Deb; Deodhar; S.D. Deodhar
- Citizenship: Indian
- Education: Film and Television Institute of India
- Occupation: Cinematographer
- Years active: 1972–2010
- Spouse: Shrabani Deodhar (m. 1981–2010)
- Children: Sai Deodhar (daughter)
- Relatives: Shakti Anand (son-in-law)

Debu Deodhar was an Indian cinematographer who has been part of Indian cinema since 1972. His awards include the Maharashtra State Film Award, the Zee Gaurav Puraskar, and the Goa State award for outstanding cinematography for films such as Kairee (1999) and Daayraa (1996).

== Background ==
Debu Deodhar was born in a Marathi family. He graduated from Film and Television Institute of India, Pune with a specialisation in cinematography. He began work as a cinematographer in 1972 as an assistant cameraman. His 38-year career over more than twentyfive films culminated with his final film, Marmabandh (2010). He was cinematographer for his wife's first-ever film, Lapandav (1993), for which she won the National Film Award Silver Lotus for 'Best Marathi Feature Film'. He worked with her on every one of her films until his death in 2010.

Deodhar died at his residence in Mumbai, the evening of 1 September 2010 at the age of 62, after suffering from a severe lung disorder, and cancer. He was a "well-loved and much-respected professional, the condolence meet drawing a large number of actors and technicians. Actors like Vikram Gokhale, Sachin and Sonali Kulkarni also spoke on the occasion as did Jaya Bachchan who had a lump in her throat by the time she finished her little speech."

== Career ==
=== Filmography ===
- Lalkaar (The Challenge) (1972) (as Deodhar)
- Shaque (1976) (as S.D. Deodhar)
- Gharaonda (The Nest) (1977)
- Khatta Meetha (1981) (as S.D. Deodhar)
- Unimaginable (as S.D. Deodhar) (1981)
- Shejari Shejari (1981)
- Gav Tas Changal (1981)
- Tinhisanja & Akriet (1981)
- Thodasa Roomani Ho Jaayen (1990)
- Prahaar: The Final Attack (1991)
- Lapandav (1993)
- Pehla Baghi Mahathma - Jyotibi Phule (1993 TV movie)
- Bangarwadi (The Village Had No Walls) (1995)
- Daayraa (The Square Circle) (1996)
- Common Man (1997 TV movie)
- Sarkarnama (1998)
- Kairee (The Raw Mango) (1999)
- Silsila Hai Pyar Ka (1999)
- Lekhru (The Child) (2000)
- Dhyas Parva (2001)
- Lal Salaam (2002)
- Stumped (2003)
- Mr Lonely, Miss Lovely (2004)
- Pehchaan: The Face of Truth (2005)
- Shan (2006)
- Quest (2006)
- Maati Maay (A Grave Keeper's Tale) (2006)
- Jinki Re Jinki (2007)
- Savalee (2007)
- Antarnad (2008)
- Tinhisaanja (2009)
- Marmabandh (Bonds of Heart) (2010)

== Recognition ==
Deodhar's work was shared as part of a retrospective tribute by International Film Festival of India during December 2010, celebrating eleven filmmakers whose works "made them unforgettable chapters of Indian cinema."

- 1993, won RAPA award for 'Best Photography' for Pehla Baghi Mahathma - Jyotibi Phule
- 1995, won Maharashtra State Film Award for cinematography for Bangarwadi
