= Kanchi Kaul =

Indian actress (born 1982)

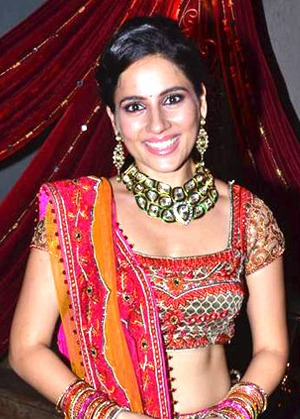
- Kaul in 2012
- Born: 24 May 1982 (age 44); Bombay, Maharashtra, India
- Occupation: Actress
- Years active: 2001–present
- Spouse: Shabir Ahluwalia (m. 2011)
- Children: 2

Kanchi Kaul (born 24 May 1982) is an Indian actress who primarily appears in Telugu films and Hindi television. Kaul made her acting debut with Telugu film Sampangi (2001), a box office success. She is best known for playing Ananya Sachdev Samarth in Ek Ladki Anjaani Si, and Shraddha Shergill Srivastav in Ek Nanad Ki Khushiyon Ki Chaabi – Meri Bhabhi.

== Career ==
Kaul made her acting debut in 2001, with the Telugu film Sampangi. She played a muslim woman who falls in love with a Hindu man. A critic from Sify noted, "Despite being a newcomer, Kanchi performs well in her scenes." The film was a commercial success. In the same year she appeared in Cheppalani Vundhi and Family Circus. In 2002, she began work on two Tamil language films, Columbus co-starring Raju Sundaram, and Kasthuri Raja's Paattuchaththam Kedkuthamma. Neither film eventually completed production. Another Tamil film titled Viyugam shot in 2004 under the stage name of Spandana, co-starring Hari Bhaskar, was also not released.

Kaul starred in two films in 2002: Idi Maa Ashokgadi Love Story and Siva Rama Raju, following which she had a cameo appearance in Pyaar Diwana Hota Hai. Reviewing Idi Maa Ashokgadi Love Story, Jeevi of Idlebrain.com noted, "Kanchi did a pretty matured and performance oriented role in this film and does justice." Kaul made her Hindi film debut in 2004 with Woh Tera Naam Tha. Taran Adarsh stated: "Kanchi delivers the maximum impact. The actress carries off some dramatic portions with grace, never making you feel even once that this is her debut-making Hindi film."

Kaul expanded to television with Ek Ladki Anjaani Si opposite Shakti Anand, where she played Ananya, from 2005 to 2006. From 2007 to 2008, she appeared as Suhana in Bhabhi and then she played Soni in Maayka, in 2009. Kaul played Shraddha opposite Ravish Desai from 2013 to 2014, in Ek Nanad Ki Khushiyon Ki Chaabi – Meri Bhabhi. Following this, she announced her pregnancy and took a break from acting.

Following a hiatus of twelve years, Kaul made her comeback with the reality series, Dhammal with Pati Patni Aur Panga – Jodiyon Ka Reality Check, alongside her husband.

== Personal life ==
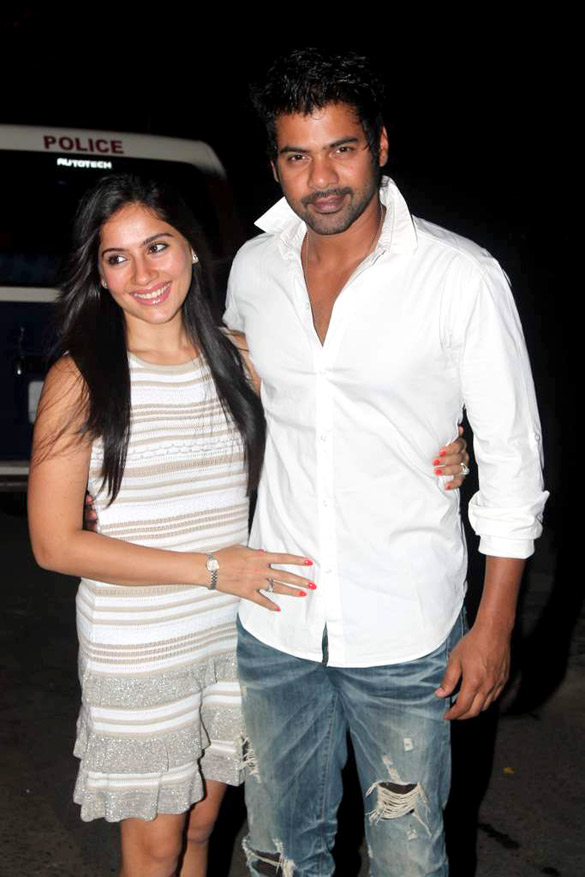
Kaul with husband Shabir Ahluwalia

Kaul met actor Shabir Ahluwalia in 2007 on the sets of Bhabhi. After a five-year relationship, Kaul married Ahluwalia on 27 November 2011. The couple have two sons, Azai (born 23 July 2014) and Ivarr (born 18 February 2016). Following the birth of her first child, she took a break from acting.

== Filmography ==
=== Films ===
Year	Title	Role	Language	Notes	Ref.
2001	Sampangi	Salwar Rizwana	Telugu		
2001	Cheppalani Vundhi		Telugu		
2001	Family Circus	Sujatha	Telugu		
2002	Idi Maa Ashokgadi Love Story	Mahalakshmi	Telugu		
2002	Siva Rama Raju	Rani	Telugu		
2002	Pyaar Diwana Hota Hai	Kanchi	Hindi	Cameo appearance	
2004	Woh Tera Naam Tha	Reshma Khan	Hindi		

=== Television ===
Year	Title	Role	Notes	Ref.
2005–2006	Ek Ladki Anjaani Si	Ananya "Anu" Sachdev Samarth		
2007–2008	Bhabhi	Suhana Seth Thakral		
2009	Maayka	Soni Malhotra Khurana		
2013–2014	Ek Nanad Ki Khushiyon Ki Chaabi – Meri Bhabhi	Shraddha Shergill Srivastav		
2026-present	Pati Patni Aur Panga	Contestant	Season 2	
