= Ghayal =

Ghayal may refer to:

- Ghayal (1951 film), a 1951 Hindi film
- Ghayal (1990 film), a Hindi-language film by Rajkumar Santoshi
  Ghayal: Once Again, a 2016 Hindi-language sequel film written and directed by Sunny Deol
- Ghayal: The Power Man or Brindavana, a 2013 Indian film

== See also ==
- Ghayaal, a 1993 Marathi film
- Gayal, a large domesticated Asian bovine
