= Bal Karve =

Indian actor (1930–2025)

- Born: 25 August 1930; Poona, Bombay Presidency, British India
- Died: 28 August 2025 (aged 95); Mumbai, Maharashtra, India
- Occupation(s): Actor, civil engineer
- Years active: 1977–2009

Bal Karve (Marathi: बाळ कर्वे; 25 August 1930 – 28 August 2025) was an Indian actor known for his roles in Marathi language film, television and theatre.

== Marathi serials ==
Karve was most popular for his role of Gundyabhau, along with Dilip Prabhavalkar as Chimanrao, in the television sitcom Chimanrao Gundyabhau, which was based on CV Joshi's books on Doordarshan.

== Marathi stage ==
Karve was a part of the original 1978 play Suryachi Pille, which was directed by Damu Kenkre, and featured Madhav Vatve, Dilip Prabhavalkar, Mohan Gokhale, Sadashiv Amrapurkar and Shanta Jog.

== Death ==
Karve died in Mumbai on 28 August 2025, three days after his 95th birthday.

== Accolades ==
- Karve received the Jeevan Gaurav Puraskar at Zee Natya Gaurav awards in 2018.

== Filmography ==
- 1978: Banyabapu
- 1982: Chatak Chandni
- 1991: Godi Gulabi
- 1993: Lapandav
