= Arzoo Govitrikar =

Indian model and actress

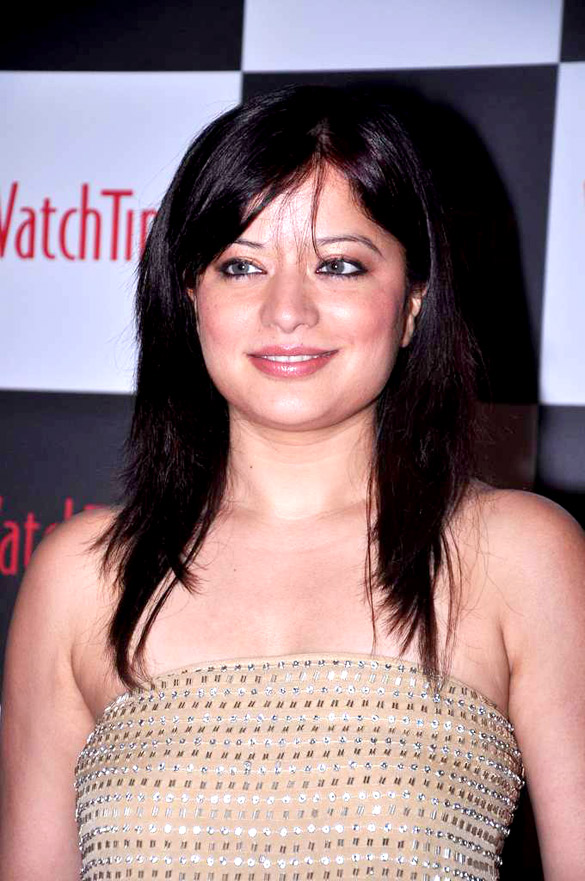
- Born: Arzoo Govitrikar; Panvel, Raigad, Maharashtra India
- Occupations: Actress; model
- Years active: 2001–2017, 2020–2024
- Spouse: Siddharth Sabharwal (m. 2010; div. 2019)
- Children: 1
- Relatives: Aditi Govitrikar (sister), Alpan Govitrikar (brother)

Arzoo Govitrikar is an Indian model and actress who appeared in film and television.

== Personal life ==
Arzoo Govitrikar was born in Panvel, Raigad, Maharashtra in a Chitpavan Brahmin family and raised in Mumbai. Arzoo studied electronics and telecommunications engineering. Her elder sister Aditi Govitrikar is an actress and model.

She married Siddharth Sabharwal, who works in his family business, and lives in Mumbai and they have a son called Aashman. On 19 February 2019, Arzoo filed a domestic violence case against her husband and sought divorce and custody of their son.

== Career ==
Despite her engineering background, her sister Aditi Govitrikar influenced her to change careers, so she appeared as a model in some commercials and acted in the Malayalam movie Kakkakuyil (2001). Later she appeared in other films and the TV shows Ek Ladki Anjani Si (on Sony), Ghar Ek Sapna, CID and Naagin 2.

== Filmography ==
Year	Title	Role	Language	Notes
2001	Kakkakuyil	Radhika Menon / Revathy	Malayalam	
2002	Manasutho	Sapana	Telugu	
2003	Baghban	Priya Malhotra	Hindi	
2004	Let's Enjoy	Shreya	Hindi	
2004	Manmadhan	Girl in café	Tamil	
2005	Dreams	Simran	Hindi	
2008	Tulsi	Dr. Anjali D'souza	Hindi	
2008	Mere Baap Pehle Aap	Anjana "Anju" Rao	Hindi	credited as Arzoo
2012	Overtime	Liza	Hindi	
2020	It's My Life	Sanjana Sharma	Hindi	Released after 13 years, filmed in 2007

=== Television ===
Year	Name	Role	Channel
2005–2007	Ek Ladki Anjaani Si	Tulika Samarth	Sony TV
2006–2008	CID	Reena	Sony TV
2007–2009	Ghar Ek Sapnaa	Vanshika	Sahara One
2017	Naagin 2	Manjusha	Colors TV
2024–present	Chahenge Tumhe Itna	Neelima	Shemaroo Umang
