= Vaju Kotak =

Indian writer

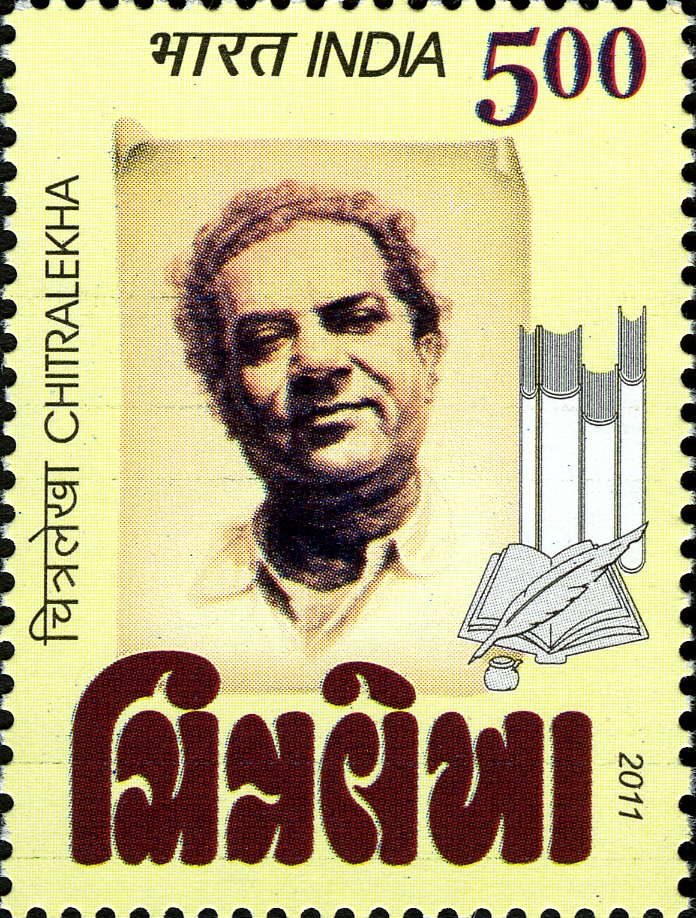
- Vaju Kotak on the postage stamp of India. (2011)
- Born: Vaju Lakhamshi Kotak; 30 January 1915; Rajkot, Gujarat, India
- Died: 29 November 1959 (aged 44); Bombay, Maharashtra, India
- Education: Alfred High School, Rajkot
- Occupations: writer, publisher, journalist, film director and screenwriter
- Spouse: Madhuribahen (m. 1946)
- Writing career
- Language: Gujarati
- Notable work

Vaju Kotak (30 January 1915 – 29 November 1959) was a Gujarati writer, publisher, journalist, an Indian film screenwriter and most known to be Founder of famous Gujarati weekly magazine Chitralekha, published in Gujarati and Marathi.

== Early life ==
Kotak was born on 30 January 1915 in Rajkot, Gujarat. He studied up to the first year of BA. In 1937, he came to Ahmedabad for a job and from 1939, settled in Bombay.

Kotak married Madhuribahen in 1946. He died on 29 November 1959 in Hurkisondas Hospital, Bombay following a heart attack.

== Career ==
=== Movies ===
He started his film career as an assistant director and screenwriter for Kasauti (1941). In 1944, he wrote the screenplay for Paristan, directed by Mahesh Kaul. In the film he worked as an assistant director. he had also worked as a screenwriter. He wrote screenplay and dialogues for Parivartan, Bhalai, Mangalfera, Nanandbhojai, Gorakhdhandha, Lagnmandap etc.

=== Writing ===
In 1941, Kotak published his first book Ruparani, a translation of the autobiography of Isadora Duncan. He started writing a column in Jay Saurasthra magazine published from Rajkot. In 1946, he became the editor of Chitrapat. His Novel Juvan Haiya (Young Hearts) was partially published in serialized form in Chitrapat and later chapters were published in Chhaya magazine. In 1950, he started his independent weekly news magazine Chitralekha. He started monthly magazines Bij (1951) and Light (1953) in Gujarati and English respectively. In 1958, he started Jee Cinema magazine.

Ramkada Vahu, Juvan Haiya, Gharni Shobha, Chundadi ane Chokha, Ha ke Na, Aansuna Toran, Manavatano Maheraman, Aansuni Aatashbaji ane Doctor Roshanlal, Prabhatna Pushpo, Buddhina Brahmchari, Kadavna Thapa, Galgota, Puran ane Vighnan, Chandarvo, Dhondu ane Pandu, Shaherma Farata Farata and Badapanna Vanarveda are his literary works.

Kotak wrote 9 novels. His incomplete novel Dr. Roshanlal was completed by Harkisan Mehta, then editor of Chitralekha. On Silver Jubilee of Chitralekha, his novel Dr. Roshanlal was adapted into a Gujarati play, Him Angara. The play was well received and had more than 100 performances. Shaherma farta farta and Prabhatna Pushpo are his collections of essays.

== Filmography ==
Hindi

Year	Film	Language	Director	Cast	Notes
1944	Paristan	Hindi	Mahesh Kaul	Pahari Sanyal, Anjali Devi, Ranjit Kumari, Moni Chatterjee	Assistant Director and Writer
1946	Shatranj	Hindi	Vaju Kotak and G.S. Potdar	Krishnkant, Leela Chitnis	Writing credits: H. Advani, Vaju Kotak, G.S. Potdar, Tara Singh
1948	Jalsa	Hindi	Kamlakar	Shyama, Geeta Bali	Writing credits: Pandit Indra, Vaju Kotak

Gujarati

- Parivartan
- Bhalai
- Mangalfera (1949)
- Nanandbhojai
- Gorakhdhandha
- Lagnmandap

== Recognition ==
In 1973, a road in Bombay was named Vaju Kotak Marg. On 9 June 1993, spiritual leader Morari Bapu inaugurated Vaju Kotak Marg in Rajkot. On 7 September 2002, Takhteshwar Temple road in Bhavnagar was named as Vaju Kotak Marg. On 20 April 2011, the Indian Postal Department issued a postage stamp on the Chitralekha magazine depicting the image of Vaju Kotak.

== See also ==
- List of Gujarati-language writers
