= Family Circus (2001 film) =

2001 Telugu film by Teja

- Movie Poster
- Directed by: Teja
- Written by: Teja
- Produced by: Sunkara Madhu Murali
- Starring: Jagapati Babu; Rajendra Prasad; Roja; Kanchi Kaul
- Cinematography: Rasool Ellore
- Edited by: Shankar
- Music by: R. P. Patnaik
- Production company: Melody Multimedia
- Release date: 1 June 2001
- Running time: 127 minutes
- Country: India
- Language: Telugu

Family Circus is a 2001 Telugu-language comedy film written and directed by Teja. It stars Jagapati Babu, Rajendra Prasad, Roja, Kanchi Kaul, and music composed by R. P. Patnaik. It was produced by Sunkara Madhu Murali under the Melody Multimedia banner.

== Plot ==
A simpleton, Subramanyam / Subbu, works as a manager in a firm. He marries a no-nonsense lady, Durga, and the couple adopts Subbu's deceased sister's two sons. Following this, Durga delivers twins. The imps ball up with the deviltry, for which Subbu has to shift their residence frequently. Thus, he purchases his own in a locality full of bizarre characters, including a retired Lance naik Bhagath, a loud-mouthed neighbor, Santharam, and some demented feminists.

== Cast ==
- Jagapati Babu as Subramanyaam "Subbu"
- Rajendra Prasad as Pataudi, Subramanyam's tenant
- Roja as Durga, Subramanyam's wife
- Kanchi Kaul as Sujatha
- Jhansi as Kantham, Pataudi's wife
- Kota Srinivasa Rao as Lance naik Bhagath
- Brahmanandam as Dr.Anand
- Sudhakar as Kaasi, Subramanyam's friend
- M. S. Narayana as Nani, Subramanyam's brother-in-law
- Sunil as Bhimavaram Rowdy
- Tanikella Bharani as Fishing Inspector
- Dharmavarapu Subramanyam as Santharam
- Babu Mohan a man in the hospital
- Giri Babu as Krishna Rao
- Babloo as Babloo, Sujatha's college mate who loves her
- Ananth as Bar Waiter
- Chitti Babu as Bar Waiter
- Gundu Hanumantha Rao as Balloon Seller
- Gundu Sudarshan as Rajesh Khanna (cameo appearance)
- Kallu Chidambaram as Chidambara Sastry
- Junior Relangi as Subramanyam's landlord
- Jenny
- Narsing Yadav as Chari
- Rama Prabha as Bamma, Subramanyam's grandmother
- Rajitha as Doctor
- Ramya Sri as a neighbor in the colony
- Madhumani as Subramanyam's younger sister
- Madhurisen as Durga's friend

== Soundtrack ==
Family Circus

Film score by R. P. Patnaik
- Released: 2001
- Genre: Soundtrack
- Length: 24:06
- Label: Sneha Music
- Producer: R. P. Patnaik

R. P. Patnaik chronology
Shubhavela (2000)	Family Circus (2001)	Nuvvu Nenu (2001)

Music composed by R. P. Patnaik. Lyrics written by Kulasekhar. Music released on SNEHA Music Company.

No.	Title	Singer(s)	Length
1.	"Nannu Kottakuro"	R. P. Patnaik, Lenina	3:36
2.	"Kalalo Neeve"	Saandip	4:42
3.	"Jim Jim Jatara"	R. P. Patnaik, Rajendra Prasad	4:27
4.	"Neelam Neelam"	R. P. Patnaik, Ravi Varma	4:14
5.	"Moodu Mulla Bandham"	Parthasarathy, Sridhar, Nitya Santhoshini	4:00
6.	"Family Circus"	Chorus	3:42
Total length:			24:06

== Critical reception ==
Full Hyderabad wrote "Family Circus is nothing but chaos from take one. And no maker could have brought out this chaos that plagues a family in such a systematic manner. In the process, Teja also produces some of the most hilarious performances from the leading Telugu comedians in this cast". Indiainfo wrote "A movie with a bunch of comedians and Chitram fame Teja directing it, may give you lots of expectations about the movie. Hold on! No high expectations please! Yes, the movie can be watched for some humorous scenes in it but on the whole not a very interesting fare. A time pass! The movie is like a platform, where you will get to see all the present-day comedians of Tollywood".
