= Santhi Sandesam =

- DVD cover
- Directed by: Chandra Shekar Reddy
- Written by: Tripuraneni Maharadi
- Produced by: Shakamuri Mallikarjun Rao
- Starring: Krishna; Ramyasri
- Cinematography: Meka Ramakrishna
- Edited by: Adirala Ravi Teja
- Music by: Vandemataram Srinivas
- Production company: Padmalaya Studios
- Release date: 9 July 2004
- Running time: 140 min
- Country: India
- Language: Telugu

Santhi Sandesam (English: Message of Peace) is a 2004 Indian Telugu-language biographical film directed by P. Chandrasekhar Reddy. The film stars Krishna as Jesus and Ramyasri.

== Cast ==
- Krishna as Jesus
- Ramyasri
- Suman as John the Baptist
- Vinod Kumar Alva
- Kota Srinivasa Rao
- Ravali
- Ranganath
- Jayaprakash Reddy
- AVS
- Raghunatha Reddy
- Sudha
- Jayalalita
- Abhinayashree
- Rajitha

== Soundtrack ==
The soundtrack for the film is by Vandemataram Srinivas.

Track listing
No.	Title	Lyrics	Singer(s)	Length
1.	"Chinnari Balallara"	C. Narayana Reddy	S. P. Balasubrahmanyam	6:04
2.	"Kani Vini Erugani Karunaku"	Suddala Ashok Teja	Usha, Vandemataram Srinivas	5:24
3.	"Jillu Jillo"	Veturi	Anuradha Sriram	5:11
4.	"Deiva Kumaruni (Rukshakuda)"	Suddala Ashok Teja	S. P. Balasubrahmanyam	7:15
5.	"Karuna Sagara"	Goreti Venkanna	Vandemataram Srinivas	4:45
Total length:				28:39

== Awards ==
Nandi Awards

- Best Costume Designer - Murali
