= Ramya Sri =

Indian actress

- Born: Visakhapatnam, Andhra Pradesh, India
- Occupation: Actress
- Years active: 1997–present

B. Ramya Sri is an Indian actress, director, screenwriter, producer, dancer and model, known for her works in Telugu cinema, Kannada cinema, and Tamil cinema, few Malayalam, Hindi, Bhojpuri including softcore and B movies. In 2013 she appeared in O... Malli as a tribal women for which she has garnered the state Nandi Special Jury Award.

== Partial filmography ==
=== Telugu ===
- Korukunna Priyudu (1997)
- Suprabhatam (1998)
- Samarasimha Reddy (1999)
- Yuvaraju (2000)
- Family Circus (2001)
- Jackpot (2001)
- Nuvvu Nenu (2001)
- Prema Sandadi (2001)
- Vendi Mabbulu (2002)
- Tappu Chesi Pappu Koodu (2002)
- Mee Kosam (2002)
- Raghava (2002)
- Aadi (2002)
- Premalo Pavani Kalyan (2002)
- Evare Athagadu (2003)
- Ammayilu Abbayilu (2003)
- Fools (2003)
- Simhadri (2003)
- Vishnu (2003)
- Maa Alludu Very Good (2003)
- Premante Maade (2004)
- Santhi Sandesam (2004)
- Evaru Nenu (2005)
- Youth (2005)
- Yamagola Malli Modalayindi (2007)
- Saleem (2009)
- Bommana Brothers Chandana Sisters (2008)
- Bhale Mogudu Bhale Pellam (2011)
- O Malli (2015) also director
- Babala Bagotham (2018)

=== Tamil ===
- Suryavamsam (1997)
- Maru Malarchi (1998)

=== Kannada ===
- Aryabhata (1999)

=== Hindi ===
- Sooryavansham (1999)
