= Premalo Pavani Kalyan =

Indian romantic drama film

- Official poster
- Directed by: Polur Ghatika Chalam
- Written by: Dialogues: Polur Ghatika Chalam; Nagaraju
- Screenplay by: Polur Ghatika Chalam
- Produced by: B.A. Raju
- Starring: Deepak; Ankitha
- Cinematography: Jawahar Reddy
- Music by: Ghantadi Krishna
- Production company: Superhit Friends
- Release date: 13 December 2002
- Country: India
- Language: Telugu

Premalo... Pavani Kalyan (transl. Pavani and Kalyan are in love) (Note: Pavani Kalyan, the name of the two lead characters, refers to Pawan Kalyan.) is a 2002 Indian Telugu-language romantic drama film directed by Polur Ghatika Chalam and starring Deepak and Ankitha.

== Cast ==
- Deepak as Kalyan
- Ankitha as Pavani
- Sunil
- Kota Srinivasa Rao as Sitarama Raju
- Ranganath as Dasaratha
- Jayaprakash Reddy as Jayaprakash
- Giribabu
- Brahmanandam
- Ali
- A.V.S.
- Venu Madhav
- M. S. Narayana
- Raghunatha Reddy
- Gundu Hanumantha Rao
- Ironleg Sastri
- Kallu Chidambaram
- Varsha
- Ramaprabha
- Ramya Sri
- Devisri
- Anitha
- Madhumati
- Apoorva

== Production ==
The film is directed by Polur Ghatika Chalam, who wrote the story for Sampangi (2001) starring Deepak. The film is produced by Super Hit film magazine editor B. A. Raju.

== Release ==
The film released on 13 December 2002.

== Reception ==
Gudipoodi Srihari of The Hindu opined that "BREAKING THE monotony of the campus love stories, this film proves a refreshing drama of love, coupled with family sentiments and friendly relationships. It is a carefully crafted work of director Ghatikachalam". Jeevi of Idlebrain.com said that "The only plus point of the film is music. The primary drawbacks of the film are dull narration and nativity problem of hero. May be you can watch this film at your leisure". A critic from Sify wrote that "Deepak is wooden-faced throughout while Ankitha looks glamorous. The music of Gantadi Krishna is disappointing. On the whole it is a run-off-the-mill love story with a tame climax".

== Box office ==
The film ran for a hundred days, in 25 centres across Andhra Pradesh, despite a slow start.
