= Sambhav Asambhav =

- Genre: Drama
- Directed by: Anant Mahadevan
- Opening theme: "Sambhav Asambhav" by Preety Bhalla
- Country of origin: India
- Original language: Hindi
- No. of seasons: 1
- No. of episodes: 26

Production
- Producer: Amar Butala
- Production locations: Madh Island; Film City; Mona Kapoor Studio
- Camera setup: Multi-camera
- Running time: Approx. 24 minutes
- Production company: Sheel Raaj Productions

Original release
- Network: Sony TV
- Release: 1 May – 23 October 2003

Sambhav Asambhav (transl. Possible, impossible) was a Hindi language Indian television series that premiered on Sony TV on 1 May 2003, is based on a Gujarati novel Sambhav Asambhav written by Harkisan Mehta. The story is based on the lives of who get caught in the vortex of reincarnation. The series was directed by known television director Anant Mahadevan, and was shot at various locations in Mumbai including Film City and Madh Island. The show ended on 23 October 2003. It used to air every Thursday.

== Cast ==
- Sangeeta Ghosh as Maya Siddharth Nath
- Shakti Anand as Siddharth Nath
- Vikram Gokhale as Amar Nath
- Dimple Inamdar as Meera Amar Nath
- Pooja Ghai Rawal as Kanika
- Rajesh Kumar as Amar Nath
- Naresh Suri as Dr. Devdutt
- Rupa Divetia as Daya
- Sumukhi Pendse as Sheela
- Mukesh Rawal as Maya's Mama
- Mugdha Shah as Maya's Mami
- Anil Dhawan as Manmohan
- Ghanashyam Nayak as Swami
