= Ek Ladki Anjaani Si (TV series) =

Indian television show

- Genre: Drama
- Written by: Suttapa Sikdar, Rajita, sanjay kumar
- Directed by: Ravi Raj, Santosh Bhatt Arvind Gupta
- Starring: Kanchi Kaul; Arzoo Govitrikar; Karishma Tanna
- Music by: Abhijeet Hegdepatil
- Country of origin: India
- No. of episodes: 364

Production
- Producers: Meesha Gautam, Sheel Kumar
- Running time: 23 minutes

Original release
- Network: Sony Entertainment Television
- Release: 21 November 2005 – 12 September 2007

Ek Ladki Anjaani Si (transl. A stranger girl) is an Indian television series which aired on Sony Entertainment Television.

== Plot ==
Anu is a very motivated, talented, and daring teenager that would do anything to fulfil her dreams. Ek Ladki Anjaani Si is a Hindi television series that shows the unique story of an eighteen-year-old girl, named Anu. The genre of this series is drama. The main protagonist, Anu, is played by Kanchi Kaul, and later played by Sai Deodhar.

== Cast ==
- Kanchi Kaul as Ananya "Anu" Sachdev Samarth (2005–2006)
- Shakti Anand as Nikhil Samarth
- Arzoo Govitrikar as Tulika Nikhil Samarth
- Karishma Tanna as Ayesha
- Sai Deodhar as Ananya "Anu" Sachdev Samarth (2006–2007)
- Cezanne Khan as Dr. Dhruv Modi (2007) (Dead)
- Vaishnavi Mahant as Meera Sachdev
- Mohnish Bahl as Veer
- Niyati Joshi as Mrs. Samarth: Nikhil's mother
- Usha Bachani as Ayesha's mother
- Vikas Bhalla as Akshay
- Vishal Singh as Yash
- Amrapali Gupta as Riya: Rajesh's daughter
- Vishal Watwani as Micky
- Swati Anand as Dr. Sunita
- Akshay Anand as Abhimanyu
- Rio Kapadia as Mr Shankarn
- Himani Shivpuri as Razia
- Hasan Zaidi as Suneel Saxena
- Nigaar Khan as Anita
- Sanjeev Seth as Rajesh: Meera's boyfriend; Ananya and Riya's father
