= Jeena Isi Ka Naam Hai =

- A promotional logo image of Jeena Isi Ka Naam Hai
- Created by: Sucharita Ghosh Stephenson, NDTV
- Directed by: NDTV(Season 1) and T.V. Vinod (vinod vijayan thazavana) (Season 2)
- Starring: Farooq Shaikh and Suresh Oberoi (Season 1)
- Opening theme: "Jeena Isi Ka Naam Hai" by Roop Kumar Rathod
- Country of origin: India
- No. of seasons: 2
- No. of episodes: 97 total

Production
- Executive producers: Shweta Piprodla and Sriram Subramanian
- Producers: Sucharita Ghosh, NDTV (Season 1) and Shashi Ranjan (Season 2)
- Production location: Mumbai
- Running time: 60 minutes

Original release
- Network: Zee TV 9X
- Release: 22 March 2002 – 2008

Jeena Isi Ka Naam Hai was an Indian talk show hosted initially by Bollywood actor Farooq Shaikh and later by Bollywood actor Suresh Oberoi. It premiered on 22 March 2002, and due to the success of its first season, the show reappeared on Zee TV channel on 7 October 2006.

The show featured interviews of Bollywood personalities and other Indian celebrities.

== Hosts ==
- Farooq Shaikh and Suresh Oberoi (Season 1)
- Roshan Abbas (Season 2)

== Celebrity guest appearance ==
=== Season 1 ===
Episode #	Guest	Family/Friends
1	Shahrukh Khan	Juhi Chawla, Farah Khan, Aziz Mirza, Vivek Vaswani, Barry John, Ashok Vasan, Bikash Mathur, Raman Sharma, Vivek Khushalani, Sabby Taneja, Reema Sarin, Shivani Wazir Pasrich, Anuj Kothari
2	Aishwarya Rai	Chandrachur Singh, Neeta Lulla, Gautam Rajadhyaksha
3	Sanjay Dutt	Sunil Dutt, Priya Dutt, Mahesh Bhatt, Mahesh Manjrekar
5	Priety Zinta	Farhan Akhtar, Kundan Shah, Manisha Koirala, Kelly Dorjee
6	Laloo Prasad Yadav	Rabri Devi, Mahesh Bhatt
6	Sushmita Sen	Meghna Gulzar
7	Namrata Shirodkar	Sangita Chopra, Milind Lutharia, Vivek Vaswani, Shilpa Shirodkar
8	Hema Malini	Esha Deol, Ramesh Sippy
9	David Dhawan	Anil Dhawan, Sanjay Dutt, Govinda, Satish Shah
10	Kiran Bedi	Nafisa Ali
11	Tanuja Samarth	Kajol, Tanisha Mukherjee
12	M.F. Hussain	Rakesh Nath, Anjolie Ela Menon
13	Vivek Oberoi	Shaad Ali, Dia Mirza
14	Jaya Prada	Amar Singh
15	Mahesh Bhatt	Pooja Bhatt, Soni Razdan, Mukesh Bhatt, Alia Bhatt, Shaheen Bhatt
16	V.P. Singh	I.K. Gujral
17	Yuvraj Singh	
18	Anil Kapoor	Boney Kapoor, Sanjay Kapoor, Jackie Shroff, Satish Kaushik, Javed Akhtar
19	Akshay Kumar	Sukhbir Singh, Abbas–Mustan, Amar Singh
20	Raveena Tandon	Ravi Tandon, Veena Tandon, Shubroto Roy, Suchitra Pillai, Prahalad Kakkar, Namrata Shirodkar, John Abraham, Rakeysh Omprakash Mehra, Anna Singh, Kalpana Lajmi, Mahesh Bhatt
21	Mohammad Azharuddin	Ajay Jadeja Saba Karim
22	Dia Mirza	Vivek Oberoi, Priyanshu Chatterjee
23	Arbaaz Khan	Sohail Khan, Sajid Khan, Malaika Arora, Amrita Arora, Sanjay Kapoor, Isha Koppikar
24	Naseeruddin Shah	Ratna Pathak Shah, Imaad Shah, Benjamin Gilani, Deepti Naval, Ravi Baswani, Kaizad Gustad, Lillete Dubey, Raza Murad
25	Jagjit Singh	Chitra Singh
26	Saurav Ganguly	Arun Lal, Zaheer Khan, Hemang Badani
27	Karishma Kapoor	Manish Malhotra, Sridevi Kapoor, Akshay Kumar, Suneel Darshan, Shyam Benegal, Babita Kapoor
28	Anu Malik	Sardar Malik, Harmesh Malhotra, Rajeev Mehra, Alka Yagnik, Farah Khan, Udit Narayan, Sunidhi Chauhan, Sonu Nigam
29	N. R. Narayana Murthy	
30	Bappi Lahiri	B. Subhash, Jaya Prada, Usha Uthup
31	Adnan Sami	Govinda, Bela Sehgal, Gurjeet Budhwal
32	Kader Khan	Asrani, Aruna Irani, Shakti Kapoor
33	Bipasha Basu	Dino Morea, Milind Soman, John Abraham, Mukesh Bhatt
34	Milind Soman	Sunit Varma, Dipannita Sharma, Sonali Kulkarni, Rahul Dev
35	Pankaj Udhas	Manhar Udhas, Pinaz Masani, Talat Aziz
36	Shubha Mudgal	Viva Band
37	Dr. Verghese Kurien	Mrs. Kurian, Nirmala Kurian, Roger Periera
38	Mohinder Amarnath	Rajinder Amarnath, Syed Kirmani, Madan Lal, Yashpal Sharma, Sandeep Chowta
39	Honey Irani	Saroj Irani, Farhan Akhtar, Raman Kumar, Benjamin Gilani
40	Khalid Mohammed	Shyam Benegal, M.F. Hussain
41	Sanjay Khan	Akbar Khan, Zayed Khan, Bob Christo
42	Satish Kaushik	Anupam Kher, Kirron Kher, Boney Kapoor, Tusshar Kapoor, Bhumika Chawla
43	Manisha Koirala	Deepti Naval, Vivek Mushran
44	Johnny Lever	Dinesh Hingu, Tabassum, Anandji, Abbas–Mustan, Guddi Maruti, Mehmood
45	Rani Mukherji	Karan Johar, Arbaaz Khan
46	Shilpa Shetty	Shamita Shetty, Rocky S, Chandrachur Singh, Neena Pillai
47	Prem Chopra	Sawan Kumar Tak, Shakti Samanta, Prem Krishna
48	Pooja Bhatt	Mahesh Bhatt, Anna Singh, Daboo Ratnani, Deepak Tijori, Sharad Kapoor
49	Kumar Sanu	Jagjit Singh, Sapna Mukherjee, Sameer, Shravan, Himesh Reshammiya, Alka Yagnik
50	Farah Khan	Sajid Khan, Shahrukh Khan, Malaika Arora, Karan Johar, Sajid Nadiawala, Zayed Khan, Amrita Rao, Sunil Shetty, Sushmita Sen
51	Abhijeet Bhattacharya	Anand Milind, Jatin–Lalit, Sonu Nigam
52	Alka Yagnik	Jatin, Kumar Sanu, Udit Narayan, Kumar Sanu
53	Shiamak Davar	Perizaad Zorabian, Boman Irani, Shahid Kapoor
54	Pankaj Kapoor	Poonam Chopra, Anuj Kapoor, Shahid Kapoor, Shyam Benegal, Ramlal Chopra, K.L.Chug, Anil Chawdhary, Dolly Ahluwahlia Tewari, Kamal Tewari, Supriya Pathak, Ruhan Kapoor, Sanaa Kapoor, Neena Gupta, Sushmita Mukherjee, Pankaj Parashar, Basu Chatterjee, Satish Kaushik, Manoj Pahwa, Vishal Bhardwaj
55	Prakash Jha	Prabhat Jha, Neeraj Kumar, Agajani Siraji, Kundan Shah, Manjul Sinha, Manmohan Shetty, Rajan Kothari, Disha, Deepti Naval, Jackie Shroff, Ayub Khan, Dr. Mohan Agashe, Yashpal Sharma, Ajay Devgan, Chetan Pandit, Tom Alter
56	Ken Ghosh	Karan and Shanaiya Ghosh, Akbar Sami, Arshad Warsi, Hemu, Farah Khan, Viraf Sarkari, Ashok Mehta, Atul Churamani, Alisha Chinoy, Sagarika, Anu Malik, Jules Fuller, Suchitra Krishnamoorthi, Anaida, Daler Mehndi, Prahlad Kakkar, Salil Chaturvedi, Jay, Kuki Gulati, Ramesh and Kumar Torani, Amrita Rao, Shahid Kapoor, Fardeen Khan
57	Gulshan Grover	Jackie Shroff, Umesh Mehra
58	Pandit Jasraj	Durga Jasraj, Sadhana Sargam
59	Karan Johar	Yash Johar, Farah Khan, Uday Chopra, Manish Malhotra, Rani Mukherji
60	Sunil Dutt	Sanjay Dutt, Dilip Kumar, Saira Banu, Waheeda Rehman
61	Lara Dutta	Dino Morea, Kumal Kapoor, Kelly Dorjee, Apoorva Lakhia
62	Manoj Bajpai	Piyush Mishra, Pankaj, Mahesh Bhatt, Saurabh Shukla, Makrand Deshpande, Harsha Chayya, Rakesh Mehra
63	Aftab Shivdasani	Prahalad Kakkar, Ahmed Khan, Amrita Arora, Rahul Dev, Bipasha Basu
64	Shaan	Abhijeet Bhattacharya, Sonu Nigam, Babul Supriyo, Sunidhi Chauhan, Ustad Ghulam Mustafa Khan
65	Sonu Nigam	Amar Singh, Anu Malik, Aadesh Shrivastava, Sandeep Chowta, Babul Supriyo, Abhijeet Bhattacharya, Smita Thackeray
66	Shyam Benegal	Anant Nag, Naseeruddin Shah, Amrish Puri, Ila Arun, Rajat Kapoor, Khalid Mohammed
67	Vyjantimala	Hema Malini
68	Vidhu Vinod Chopra	Jackie Shroff, Rajkumar Hirani, Sunil Dutt
69	Rahul Bose	Sujoy Ghosh, Shayan Munshi
70	Shekhar Kapoor	Prahalad Kakkar, Naseeruddin Shah, Jugal Hansraj, Anil Kapoor
71	Amrita Arora	Joyce Arora, Malaika Arora Khan, Arbaaz Khan, Vikram Kapadia, Ritika Chatterjee, Karishma Hingorani, Prahlad Kakkar, Shenaz Treasurywala, Kamaal Khan, Vikram Phadnis, Mehul Kumar, Aftab Shivdasani, Mallika Bhatt, Tusshar Kapoor, Upen Patel, Mahesh Manjrekar, Bipasha Basu and Dino Morea
72	Farhan Akhtar	Honey Irani, Javed Akhtar, Zoya Akhtar, Farah Khan, Sajid Khan, Ritesh Sidhwani, Asad Dadkar, Twinkle Khanna, Adi Pocha, Adhuna Akhtar, Shakya, Shankar Mahadevan, Ehsaan Noorani, Loy Mendonsa, Saif Ali Khan, Hrithik Roshan
73	Navjot Singh Sidhu	Dhanwant Singh Mann, Ajit Singh Javanda, Rupinder Sandhu, Sarabjit Singh, Smt. Navjot Kaur, Rabiya Kaur, Anu Manik, Maldeep Sidhu, Mohinder Amarnath, Mohammed Azharuddin, Maninder Singh, Saurav Ganguly, Ravi Shastri, Harsha Bhogle
74	Sunidhi Chauhan	Priyanka Sharma, Tabassum, Babul Supriyo, Anandji, Aditya Narayan, Aadesh Shrivastav, Annu Kapoor, Arunita, Aradhita Kapoor, Raju Singh, Sandeep Chowta, Shaan, Anand Raj Anand, Anu Malik, Sandesh Shandilya, Daboo Mallik, Jas Arora
75	Arshad Warsi	Tasneem Subedar, Iqbal Warsi, Mr. Thorpe, Valerie Markinsie, Bharat Dabholkar, Akbar Sami, Maria Goretti, Mini Mathur, Ma Prem Ritambhara, Joy Augustine, Amit Ashar, Jaya Bachchan, Priya Gill, Shashanka Ghosh, Namrata Shirodkar, Rajkumar Hirani, Boman Irani
76	Kirron Kher	Mr. Thakur Singh, Mrs. Thakur Singh, Kawal Pannu, Anupam Kher, Sunil Dutt, Kalpana Lajmi, Pravin Nischol, Abhishek Bachchan, Sikander Kher, Mrs. Dulari Kher, Nina Kilachand, B.R. Chopra, Satish Kaushik, Feroze Khan, Shyam Benegal, Sabiha Sumar
77	Dino Morea	Ronaldo Morea, Edna Morea, Nicolo Morea, Anisa, Abid Seth, Jeet Ganguly, Govindraj Tirumal, Joyen, Maureen Wadia, Twinkle Khanna, Sanjay Suri, Vikram Bhatt, Gaurav Kapoor, Dia Mirza, Bipasha Basu
78	Asha Parekh	Biswajeet, Ram Mohan, Renuka Shahane
79	Harbhajan Singh	Yuvraj Singh, Ashish Nehra, Zaheer Khan, Gurdas Mann
80	Shobhaa De	Ashok Rajadhyaksha, Danesh Barucha, Gautam Rajadhyaksha, Nari Hira, Prasad Bidapa, Avantika De, Arundhati De, Anandita De, Ranadip De, Aaditya De, Dilip De, Bhawna Somaya, Ayaz Memon, Mahesh Bhatt, Vijay Mallya
81	Tanuja Chandra	Navin Chandra, Kamna Chandra, Vikram Chandra, Sita, Savitri, Anupama Chopra, Vidhu Vinod Chopra, Tanvi Azmi, Gauri Karnik, Mukesh Bhatt, Jatin–Lalit
82	Farida Jalal	Khalid Mohammed, Inayat, Shakti Samanta, Randhir Kapoor, Anand Mahendroo, Jaya Bachchan, Shyam Benegal, Khalid Mohammad, Yash Chopra, Karan Johar, Saira Banu
83	Kundan Shah	Jagdish Shah, Ramdas Bhatkal, Saeed Mirza, Manjul Sinha, Ravi Ojha, Rakesh Bedi, Bakula Shah, Shilpa and Twisha Shah, Sudhir Mishra, Aziz Mirza, Suchitra Krishnamoorthi, Raveena Tandon, Ramesh Torani, Anupam Kher, Jimmy Shergill, Isha Koppikar, Shekhar Suman, Makrand Deshpande
84	Sanjay Gupta	Priya and Mehboob Haider, Sunita and Dharam Oberoi, Pavan Jog, Sanjeev, Ritu Chaddha, Sandeep Agarwal, Atul Agnihotri, Sajid Khan, Pankuj Parashar, Daboo Ratnani, Sanjay Dutt, Mahesh Manjrekar, Aditya Pancholi, Anand Raj Anand, Anil Kapoor, Sameera Reddy
85	Moushmi Chatterjee	Tarun Mazumdar, Basumi Ghatak, Jayant Mukherjee, Ashim Samanta, Bharti Pradhan, Anita Sippy, Sanjeev Bharghav, Farhad Nathani, Rahul Khanna
86	Nagesh Kukunoor	Naseeruddin Shah, Juhi Chawla, K.S Naidu, Shrimati Naidu, Rajesh Kukunoor, Kavita, Pallav, Jitendra Paltidkar, Elahe Hiptoola, Vikram Inamdar, Rohan De, Om Puri, Saleem Merchant
87	Dr. Vijay Mallya	Lalita Mallya, Rafiq, Nafisa Ali, Shivendra Singh, Pesi Shroff, Shobha De
88	Saurabh Shukla	Dr. Jojamaya Shukla, Makrand Deshpande, Rajat Kapur, Anil Chowdhary, Sanjeev Mehra, Preeti Dayal, Karan Razdan, Vidhu Vinod Chopra, Barnali Shukla, Vijay Acharya, Rajesh Jais, Preeti Jhangiani

=== Season 2 ===
Episode #	Guest	Family/Friends
1	Rohit Roy	
3	Rakhi Sawant	Varsha, Jaya, Madhav, Abhishek Avasthi, Prince, DJ Shezwood, Stanley, Kesar Matharu, Mahesh Bhatt, Mika Mehndi
4	Sharad Kelkar	Keerti Gaekwad Kelkar, Manav Gohil
5	Satish Shah	Amrish Mehta, Shashi Ranjan, Kundan Shah, Johnny Lever, Rakesh Bedi, Sudhir Pande, Ashok Pandit, Sumeet Raghavan, Aziz Mirza, Saeed Mirza, Raman Kumar, Madhu Shah
7	Manav Gohil	Shweta Kawatra, Sharad Kelkar, Keerti Gaekwad Kelkar
8	Roshni Chopra	Ravi Chopra, Deeya Chopra, Manju Chopra, Pallavi, Jayati, Yashsheel Jain, Ram Kapoor, Charu Sharma, Ashwini Kalsekar, Smita Raina, Vivek Manshukhani, Salil Acharya, Siddharth Anand
9	Hussain Kuwajerwala	Tina Kuwajerwala, Qaeed Kuwajerwala, Sakina Kuwajerwala, Shraddha Nigam, Shakti Anand, Sai Deodhar, Tarun Katial, Vikram Phadnis, Smita Bansal, Sonali Malhotra, Gul Panag
15	Iqbal Khan	
17	Chetan Hansraj	Aashka Goradia, Rucha Gujrati
22	Pallavi Joshi	Mallika, Renuka Shahane, Manan, Sarita, Shyam Benegal, Mohan Bhandari, Tripti Kapoor, Vivek Agnihotri, Kiran Karmarkar
23	Shivaji Satam	Prakash, Abhijit, Aniruddh, Nutan, Ashok Kelkar, Ganesh Vavikar, Neena Kulkarni, Vandana and Neela Bhagwat, Babban Dalvi, B.P.Singh, Dayanand Shetty, Dinesh Phadnis, Aditya Srivastava, Alka Verma, Anup Soni, Reema Lagoo, Dr. Ram Batla
