= Saara Akaash =

- Genre: Action, Drama
- Screenplay by: Anand Vardhan; Ila Bedi Datta
- Directed by: Gurudev Bhalla
- Creative director: Animitra Chakravarti / Anil Jha
- Starring: Sai Deodhar; Shakti Anand; Kiran Kumar; Kanwaljeet Singh
- Opening theme: "Saara Akaash" by Shaan & Mahalakshmi Iyer
- Country of origin: India
- Original language: Hindi
- No. of seasons: 1
- No. of episodes: 104

Production
- Producers: Nikhil J.Alva; Niret Alva
- Editor: Adil Wassan
- Camera setup: Shailesh N. Anikhindi
- Running time: 42 minutes (Episode 1 to Episode 77); 21 minutes (Episode 78 to Episode 104)
- Production company: Miditech

Original release
- Network: Star Plus
- Release: 7 August 2003 – 29 July 2005

Saara Akaash is an Indian television series that was broadcast on Star Plus. for one hour from 7 August 2003 to 29 July 2005. It starred Sai Deodhar, Shakti Anand, Sonal Sehgal, Kiran Kumar, Parmeet Sethi, Manav Gohil, and Manish Goel. The fictional show depicted personal and professional lives of Indian Air Force officers and was produced by Miditech.'

The series which was supposed to end in 2004, got an extension for a year due its good viewership.

It was converted to half-hour time slot (9 P.M. to 9:30 P.M.) due to the launch of the new show Kkavyanjali. From 27 January 2005 to 31 March 2005, it used to air every Thursday at 9 P.M.

== Cast ==
- Sai Deodhar as
  - Flight Lieutenant Monica Singh Kochar – Air Force cargo pilot; Suraj's daughter; Saurav's half-sister; Karan's widow; Vikram's wife.
  - ISI Agent Shazia Khan – Monica's lookalike
- Kiran Kumar as Air Commodore AOC Suraj Singh – Monica and Saurav's father
- Parmeet Sethi as Squadron Leader Srinivas Rao – Senior officer on Sukhoi
- Shakti Anand as Flight Lieutenant/ Squadron Leader Vikram Kochar – Fighter pilot on Sukhoi; Abhay and Sujata's elder son; Rahul's brother; Kabir's half-brother; Monica's second husband
- Kanwaljeet Singh as Squadron Leader/Wing Commander Abhay Kochar – Sujata's husband; Vikram, Rahul and Kabir's father
- Anuj Saxena as
  - Flight Lieutenant Karan Singh Rathore – Fighter pilot on Sukhoi; Urmila's son; Abhay Rathore's cousin; Monica's first husband (Dead)
  - ISI Agent Falaq – Karan's lookalike (Dead)
- Manish Goel as Flight Lieutenant Saurav Singh – Fighter pilot on Sukhoi; Suraj's son; Monica's half-brother; Kavita's fiancé
- Manav Gohil as Flight Lieutenant Jatin Gohil – Fighter pilot on Sukhoi; Ayesha's fiancé (Dead)
- Sonal Sehgal as ISI Agent Naaz aka Sanjana Malik – Sikandar's fake ex-wife (Dead)
- Rajlakshmi Solanki / Indira Krishnan as Sujata Kochar – Abhay's wife; Vikram and Rahul's mother (2003) / (2003–2005)
- Karishma Tanna as Kavita Pawar – AOC Pawar's elder daughter; Ayesha's sister; Saurav's fiancé
- Aparna Jaywant as Ayesha Pawar – AOC Pawar's younger daughter; Kavita's sister; Jatin's fiancé
- Tarun Khanna as ISI Agent Sikandar aka Varun Saxena; Sanjan's fake ex-husband
- Surendra Pal as Raghuveer Singh Rathore – Abhay Singh Rathore's father; Karan's uncle
- Gaurav Chopra as Abhay Singh Rathore – Raghuveer's son; Karan's cousin
- Niyati Joshi as Urmila Singh Rathore – Karan's mother
- Vaquar Shaikh as ISI Agent Mushtaq Ali aka Red Dragon
- Yash Tonk as Kabir Kochar – Abhay's son; Vikram and Rahul's half-brother
- Darshan Jariwala as AOC Pawar – Kavita and Ayesha's father
- Sudha Shivpuri as Mrs. Singh – Suraj's mother; Monica and Saurav's grandmother
- Abhimanyu Singh as Suraj's associate
- Rakshanda Khan as ISI Agent Sadia
- Karan Kapoor as ISI Agent Parvez aka Flight Lieutenant Prabhat Srivastav - Shazia's boyfriend
- Ashwin Kaushal as Kabira
- Vimarsh Roshan as Jeet
