= Harkisan Mehta =

Indian Gujarati author and journalist

- Born: Harkisan Laldas Mehta; 25 May 1928; Mahuva near Bhavnagar, Gujarat
- Died: 3 April 1998 (aged 69); Mumbai
- Occupations: Author and journalist

Harkisan Laldas Mehta (1928–1998) was a Gujarati author and journalist from India. He was the editor of a weekly, Chitralekha. He wrote several novels.

== Life ==
Mehta was born in Mahuva near Bhavnagar, Gujarat on 25 May 1928. He completed his school education from M. N. Highschool in Mahuva. He studied till inter Arts. He married on 10 February 1953 in Matunga, Mumbai. He served as an editor of Gujarati weekly, Chitralekha, from 1958 to 1998. He died on 3 April 1998 in Mumbai following heart attack.

== Works ==
Mehta wrote many of his novels in serialised format in Chitralekha weekly. His novels are often inspired from real life incidents such as Jad Chetan was inspired by Aruna Shanbaug case.

His thrillers and novels include Jagga Dakuna Verna Valamana, Amirali Thugna Pila Roomalni Ganth, Chambal Taaro Ajampo, Maanas Name Gunegar, Sansari Sadhu, Bhed Bharam, Dev Danav, Ant Aarambh, Paap Pashchatap, Jog Sanjog, Jad Chetan, Sambhav Asambhav, Tarasyo Sangam, Pravah Paltayo, Mukti Bandhan, Shesh Vishesh, Vansh Vaaras, Bhagya Saubhagya, Lay Pralay. He coauthored Doctor Roshanlal with Vaju Kotak, the founding editor of Chitralekha.

Sweden Sonanu Pinjar is his travelogue. He also wrote Sharirthi Jodayela Siyami Jodiya, a book on Siamese twins.

His novels have also been translated in other languages like Urdu and Tamil.

Saurabh Shah edited Sarjan-Visarjan, a biographical work on his life.

=== Adaptations ===
His several novels are adapted into Hindi television series and plays. Mukti Bandhan (in 2011 on Colors TV) was adaptation of Mukti Bandhan. Other examples are Khamoshi adapted from Jad Chetan, Jeevan Mrityu (Sony TV ) adapted from Bhed Bharam, Waqt Ki Raftar adapted from Vansh Varas, Sambhav Asambhav (2003, Sony TV) adapted from Sambhav Asambhav.

== See also ==
- List of Gujarati-language writers
