= Sampangi =

- Official poster
- Directed by: Sana Yadireddy
- Produced by: Kalyani Venkatesh
- Starring: Deepak; Kanchi Kaul
- Cinematography: Vijay C. Kumar
- Music by: Ghantadi Krishna
- Production company: Kalyana Venkateshwara Films
- Release date: 13 July 2001
- Country: India
- Language: Telugu

Sampangi (transl. Champaka flower) is a 2001 Indian Telugu-language romantic drama film directed by Sana Yadireddy and starring newcomers Deepak and Kanchi Kaul.

== Plot ==
Sankarnarayana, a Hindu from Visakhapatnam, and Osman, a Muslim from Hyderabad, have been close friends since childhood. Sankarnarayana’s son, Abhishek, falls in love with Salwar Rizwana at first sight, unaware that she is Osman’s daughter. She reciprocates his feelings, but upon learning of her identity, Abhishek distances himself, fearing that their relationship could jeopardize their fathers' friendship. Unable to express his love, he refrains from pursuing the relationship, and Rizwana becomes engaged to someone else. However, circumstances eventually bring them together, leading to a happy resolution.

== Cast ==
- Deepak as Abhishek
- Kanchi Kaul as Salwar Rizwana
- Ranganath as Sankarnarayana
- Chalapathi Rao as Osman
- Chandra Mohan
- Sivaji Raja
- Sana
- Sangeetha
- Veniradai Nirmala
- Kaushal
- Chinna

== Production ==
The film is directed by Sana Yadireddy, who previously directed Pittala Dora (1996), Jai Bhajaranga Bhali (1997) and Bachelors (2000). Debutante Deepak, who came to Hyderabad to shoot for an advertisement, received the role after an audition.

== Soundtrack ==
The music was composed by Ghantadi Krishna.

No.	Title	Singer(s)	Length
1.	"Pantesthe Gani"	Ghatikachalam, Ghantadi Krishna, Varikuppala Yadagiri	4:18
2.	"Gunde Enduku Echavura"	S. P. Balasubrahmanyam	5:11
3.	"Nacchave Bhama"	Sukhwinder Singh	5:07
4.	"Cheliya Ninu"	Udit Narayan, Anuradha Sriram	4:16
5.	"Sampangi"	P. Unnikrishnan	5:09
6.	"Andamaina Kundanala Bomma"	Varikuppala Yadagiri	5:50
Total length:			29:51

== Reception ==
A critic from Sify wrote, "Director Yadi Reddy and story writer Chalam has (sic.) managed to weave out a tender love story. Though the lead pair in the picture are newcomers, they have performed well. While Ranganath, Chalapathi Rao and Sangeetha steal the show. G. Krishna has composed some melodious music. For Yadi Reddy this is his fourth successful film". Sri of Telugucinema.com praised the film's music and cultural depiction but felt the lead actor needed improvement. A critic from Full Hyderabad wrote, "A good family movie, despite a rather clichéd overall theme".

== Box office ==
The film had houseful shows in Hyderabad and Secunderabad. However, the screening of the film in Nalgonda district was stopped following protests by Muslims. The film was a box office success, and Deepak earned the name Sampangi Deepak. The film was remade in Hindi by Krishna as Ishq Hai Tumse (2004).

== Awards ==
Nandi Awards

- Best Male Dubbing Artist - Raghu (for Deepak)
