= Ek Nanad Ki Khushiyon Ki Chaabi – Meri Bhabhi =

Indian soap opera television series

- Also known as: Ek Nanad Ki Khushiyon Ki Chaabi...Meri Bhabhi
- Genre: Soap opera
- Created by: DJ's a Creative Unit
- Written by: Zama Habib
- Directed by: Sidharth Sengupta; Sahib Siddiqui; K. Mohit Kumar Jha Abhimanyu RS Chauhan
- Starring: See Below
- Theme music composer: Raju Singh
- Country of origin: India
- Original language: Hindi
- No. of seasons: 1
- No. of episodes: 225

Production
- Producers: Daanyaal Kabir; Tony Singh; Deeya Singh
- Editors: Santosh Singh; Munna Prajapati
- Running time: Approx. 24 minutes
- Production company: DJ's a Creative Unit

Original release
- Network: StarPlus
- Release: 17 June 2013 – 12 April 2014

Ek Nanad Ki Khushiyon Ki Chaabi... Meri Bhabhi is an Indian Hindi-language television soap opera which aired on StarPlus from 17 June 2013 to 12 April 2014. The series was dubbed in English and aired on Star Life as Brave & Beautiful.

The show outlines the bond of love between the nanad (the sister of one's husband) and bhabhi (the wife of one's brother) of the Shergill family.

== Plot summary ==
Shraddha, the only daughter of Delhi-based colonel Zorawar Shergill, marries her boyfriend Bobby against her family's wishes and starts living with him in Mumbai. They have a son named Dhruv, and Shraddha keeps in touch with her brother, Anand's wife Kritika "Kittu".

Sometime later, suspecting Shraddha of being in trouble, Kittu convinces Anand to pay her a surprise visit in Mumbai where Anand discovers that Bobby has left Shraddha and Dhruv to fend for themselves and Shraddha is struggling to make ends meet. He brings her back home with him, after several hurdles, Shraddha procures a divorce from Bobby with help from Anand's lawyer friend, Jas and Kittu's brother, Kunal. Kunal and Shraddha fall in love but his mother Kamini tries to keep them apart not wanting a divorced single mother for a daughter-in-law. Wanting to do everything she can for her nanad's happiness, Kittu helps Kunal and Shraddha elope but their families arrive in the nick of time. Zorawar forces Shraddha to choose between him and Kunal, and she leaves a heartbroken Kunal for her family.

This worsens the relationship between Kittu and Anand who blames Kittu for the situation, Kittu decides to move to her parents' home till she wins back Anand's respect and trust, feeling sorry for Kittu, Kunal and Shraddha team up to patch things for her with Anand and tell Anand that Kittu is pregnant, Anand starts taking care of Kittu and brings her home. After some confusion, Anand realises Kittu is not pregnant and accuses her of not deserving his trust, unaware that she had no role in the plan. By the time Jas explains the situation to him, Kittu has gone missing, he finds her just about to commit suicide and apologises. They reconcile and reunite.

Meanwhile, Zorawar softens his stand and Kunal and Shraddha are finally married much to Kamini's disappointment, after several hurdles, she finally accepts Shraddha. The show ends on a happy note as Kittu announces her pregnancy.

== Cast ==
=== Main cast ===
- Esha Kansara as Kritika "Kittu" Srivastav Shergill – Purushottam and Kamini's daughter; Kunal's sister; Anand's wife; Shraddha's sister-in-law
- Kanchi Kaul as Shraddha Shergill Srivastav – Zorawar and Amrit's daughter; Anand, Ishaan and Ashish's sister; Kritika's sister-in-law; Bobby's ex-wife; Kunal's wife; Dhruv's mother
- Ravish Desai as Kunal Srivastav – Purushottam and Kamini's son; Kritika's brother; Shraddha's husband
- Vipul Gupta as Anand Shergill – Zorawar and Amrit's son; Shraddha, Ishaan and Ashish's brother; Kritika's husband

=== Recurring cast ===
- Kanwaljit Singh as Colonel Zorawar Shergill – Amrit's husband; Anand, Shraddha, Ishaan and Ashish's father
- Supriya Pilgaonkar as Amrit Zorawar Shergill – Zorawar's former sister-in-law and now wife; Anand, Shraddha, Ashish's stepmother/aunt, Ishaan's birth mother
- Abhishek Bajaj as Ishaan Shergill – Zorawar and Amrit's son; Anand, Shraddha and Ashish's brother
- Karaan Singh as Ashish Shergill – Zorawar and Amrit's son; Anand, Shraddha and Ishaan's brother; Jaya's husband
- Priyanka Singh as Jaya Shergill – Ashish's wife
- Madhura Naik as Jaspreet a.k.a. Jas – Anand's lawyer and friend
- Rohit Sagar as Purushottam Srivastav – Kamini's husband; Kriitka and Kunal's father
- Shweta Gautam as Kamini Srivastava – Purushottam's wife; Kritika and Kunal's mother
- Krutika Gaikwad as Ritika
- Bharat Chawda as Bobby Sood – Shraddha's ex-husband; Dhruv's father
- Uzair Basar as Dhruv Shergill – Shraddha and Bobby's son
- Mansi Sharma as Chhaya

=== Guest stars ===
- Surbhi Chandna as Suzanne

== Production ==
The series which was in the works since 2012, produced by Deeya Singh and Tony Singh under DJ's a Creative Unit, was initially titled as Sher Dil Shergil and the promo of the series started to air on StarPlus which was supposed to premiere during early 2013. The actors cast in the series were Supriya Pilgaonkar, Kanwaljeet Singh, Kanchi Kaul, Chhavi Mittal, Diwakar Pundir, Ulka Gupta, Parakh Madhan, Sunayana Fozdar and Uzair Basar.

However, the channel being unhappy with the episodes shot, scrapped them and instructed the production house to rework on the show and script in January 2013. The series underwent a revamp with the former script consisting of many children being reduced and change of story focus to adult cast with some cast changes with Kanchi Kaul, Supriya Pilgaonkar, Kanwaljeet Singh and Uzair Basar being retained while others being dropped out. Abhishek Bajaj, Esha Kansara, Vipul Gupta, Shweta Gautam and Rohit Sagar were some of the new additions then. The series was also renamed as Ek Nanad Ki Khushiyon Ki Chaabi... Meri Bhabhi before its premiere and was launched during early June 2013.

The series garnered average ratings in its prime time slot and in March 2014, it was decided to end the series due to its low ratings and it went off air on 12 April 2014. The shooting of the series was wrapped up on 11 April 2014.

== Reception ==
The series opened with a rating of 1.9 TVR in its debut week.
