= Sata Lota Pan Sagla Khota =

- Theatrical release poster
- Directed by: Shrabani Deodhar
- Screenplay by: Shirish Latkar
- Story by: Shrabani Deodhar
- Produced by: Nitin Tej Ahuja; Ashok Bhushan; Sai Deodhar
- Starring: Adinath Kothare; Makarand Anaspure; Pushkar Shotri; Mrunmayee Deshpande; Siddharth Chandekar; Pooja Sawant
- Cinematography: Rahul Jadhav
- Edited by: Zafar Sultan
- Music by: Siddharth Mahadevan; Soumil Shrirangpure; Aditya Bedekar
- Production company: Moving Pictures
- Release date: 5 June 2015
- Running time: 138 minutes
- Country: India
- Language: Marathi

Sata Lota Pan Sagla Khota is a 2015 Marathi-language comedy film directed by Shrabani Deodhar. The film had its theatrical release on 5 June 2015. The movie stars Adinath Kothare, Siddharth Chandekar, Pooja Sawant, Makarand Anaspure, Pushkar Shotri, and Mrunmayee Deshpande. Shrabani Deodhar directed this movie after a long gap.

== Plot ==
Jay (Adinath Kothare) is an orphan raised by and is financially supported by his Uncle Satyavan Makarand Anaspure. Satyavan lives in Dubai with his secretary (Pushkar Shotri). Satyavan sends Jay a monthly allowance to cover his expenses. Jay has friends called Veeru (Siddharth Chandekar) and Vasanti (Mrunmayee Deshpande) are buddies who are fun loving people with no worries about the future, they will do anything for money and have a good life. Veeru’s father own a scrap business and wanted his son to start taking control of it but Veeru has personal terms. Jay has girlfriend named Isha (Pooja Sawant). Isha is very rich. Along with Veeru and Vasanti, Jay and Isha live their lives happily and without worries until the day Jay realises his Uncle has stopped his allowance. The group creates a plan to make his uncle to support him once again and the confusion it creates forms the crux of story.

== Cast ==
- Adinath Kothare as Jayvardhan
- Makarand Anaspure as Satyavan
- Pushkar Shrotri as Rokde
- Mrunmayee Deshpande as Vasanti
- Siddharth Chandekar as Virendra
- Pooja Sawant as Isha
- Nishigandha Wad
- Manini Mishra
- Nagesh Bhosale

== Background ==
Director Shrabani Deodhar had the idea for this film before she took a break from film-making. After returning, she decided a young cast and experienced crew would be best to make family-oriented youth film. The co-producer of the film is her daughter Sai Deodhar. Filming completed and to release in June 2015.

== Soundtrack ==
- Saata Lota - Vishal Dadlani
- Halla Karuya - Siddharth Mahadevan, Shankar Mahadevan, Prakriti Kakkar
