= Arjan Bajwa =

Indian actor (born 1979)

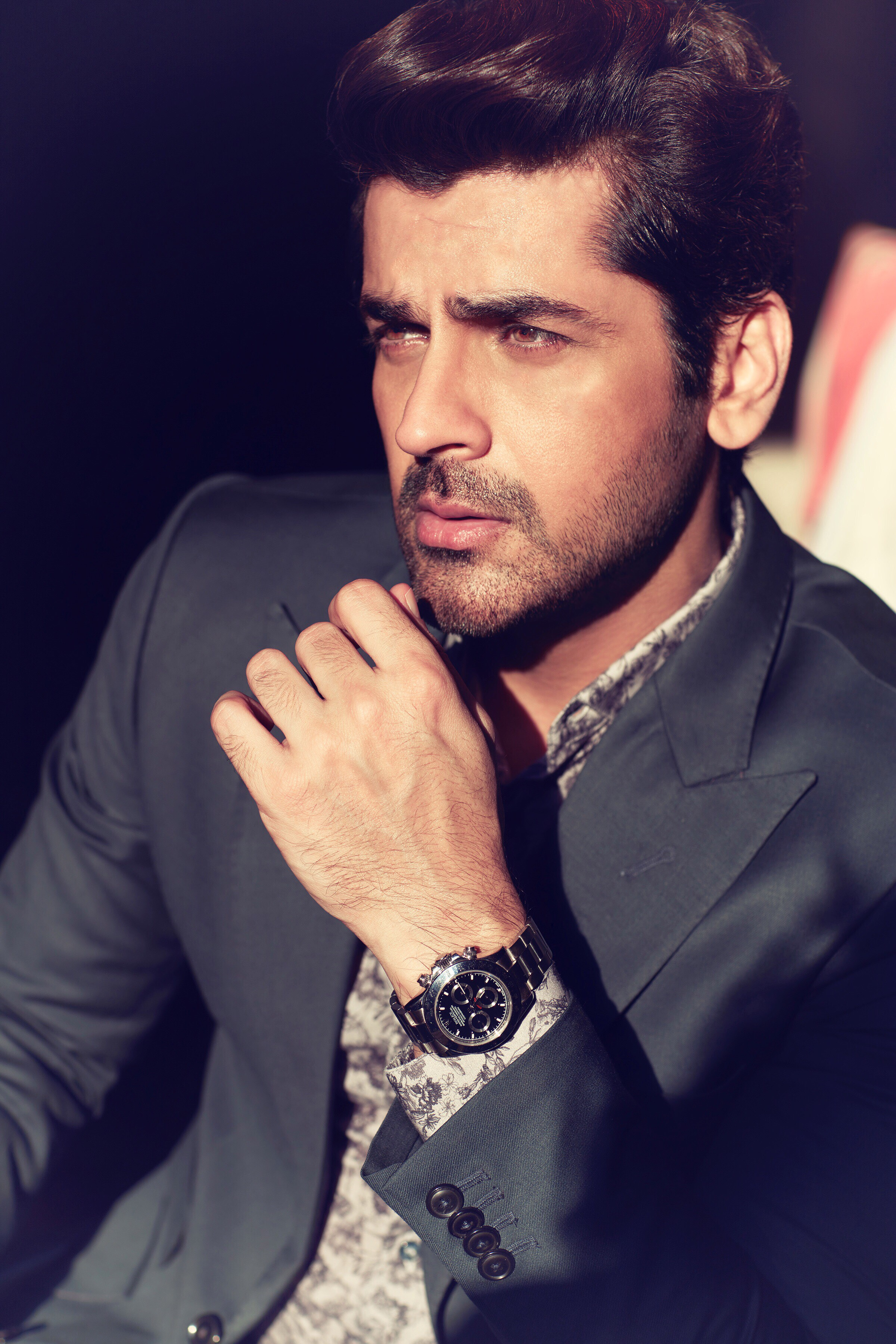
- Bajwa in 2018
- Born: 3 September 1979 (age 47); Delhi, India
- Occupation: Actor
- Years active: 1998–present

Arjan Bajwa (born 3 September 1979) is an Indian actor known for his work in Hindi and Telugu films under the stage name Deepak. He made his debut with the Telugu film Sampangi (2001). He transitioned to Hindi films with Woh Tera Naam Tha (2004) and gained recognition for supporting roles in Bhadra (2005), Guru (2007), Fashion (2008), and Arundhati (2009). He has also appeared in web series, including State of Siege: 26/11 (2020) and Bestseller (2022).

== Early life ==
Bajwa was born on 3 September 1979 in Delhi, India in a Jat Sikh family. His father Swinderjeet Singh Bajwa was a former deputy Mayor of Delhi from the Bharatiya Janata Party. Bajwa holds a degree in architecture from Delhi and is a black belt in Taekwondo.

Before entering films Bajwa was a successful model having walked the ramp for several big fashion designers.

== Career ==
Bajwa made his Telugu debut with Sampangi (2001) and played the lead in a couple of Telugu films including Premalo Pavani Kalyan (2002). After making his Hindi debut in Woh Tera Naam Tha, Bajwa's breakthrough role came in Hindi cinema, with director Mani Ratnam's critically acclaimed film, Guru. Subsequently, he played the male lead in Madhur Bhandarkar’s Fashion. Bajwa also starred in the Telugu movies King and Arundhati.

Bajwa then appeared in Ajay Devgn's action comedy film Son of Sardaar, where he played Sonakshi Sinha's boyfriend. He also acted in the action thriller Crook (2010) and Bobby Jasoos (2014). He has appeared in the film Rustom (2016). In 2019, he was seen in Sandeep Vanga's Kabir Singh where he played Shahid Kapoor's brother. He was initially hesitant to play the male lead's older brother, but accepted at the insistence of Vanga, for whom he was the only choice to play the character.

In 2023, Bajwa shot a song for his unreleased film Lucky One Gets a Second Chance alongside Myra Sareen, Tanishaa Mukerji and Iulia Vântur.

== Filmography ==
Year	Title	Role	Language	Notes	Ref.
2001	Sampangi	Abhishek	Telugu	Credited as Deepak	
2002	Nee Thodu Kavali	Vasu	Telugu	Credited as Deepak	
2002	Kanulu Musina Neevaye	Sagar	Telugu	Credited as Deepak	
2003	Premalo Pavani Kalyan	Kalyan	Telugu	Credited as Deepak	
2004	Woh Tera Naam Tha	Akhtar	Hindi		
2005	Bhadra	Raja	Telugu	Credited as Deepak	
2007	Guru	Arzan Contractor	Hindi		
2007	Summer 2007	Qateel	Hindi		
2008	Fashion	Maanav Bhasin	Hindi	Nominated—Stardust Award for Breakthrough Performance – Male	
2008	Arundhati	Rahul	Telugu	Credited as Deepak	
2008	King	Ajay	Telugu	Credited as Deepak	
2009	Mitrudu	Madhu	Telugu	Credited as Deepak	
2010	Hide N Seek	Jaideep Mahajan	Hindi		
2010	Crook	Samarth	Hindi		
2011	Tell Me O Kkhuda	Jai Vishal Singh	Hindi		
2011	Lanka	Chhote	Hindi		
2012	Son Of Sardaar	Bobby	Hindi		
2013	Himmat Singh - The King of the Ring	Himmat Singh	Punjabi		
2014	Bobby Jasoos	Lala/Ali	Hindi		
2016	Rustom	Vikram Makhija	Hindi		
2017	Chitrangada	Raja Ravi Varma	Telugu	Credited as Deepak	
2019	Kabir Singh	Karan Rajdheer Singh	Hindi		
2019	Bigil	Samar	Tamil		
2025	Demon Hunters	Sanjay	Taiwanese Mandarin, Hindi, English, Yue Chinese	Indian-Taiwanese film	

=== Television ===
Year	Title	Role	Network	Ref.
2020	State Of Siege: 26/11	Colonel Kunal Sahota	ZEE5	
2022	Bestseller	Tahir Wazir	Amazon Prime Video	

== Discography ==
- Ghar Aaja Sohneya Remix by Shazia Manzoor (1998) (cameo appearance)
