= Sarkarnama =

- VCD cover
- Directed by: Shrabani Deodhar
- Written by: Ajey Jhankar
- Produced by: Ajey Jhankar
- Starring: Ashwini Bhave; Dilip Prabhavalkar; Yashwant Dutt; Ajinkya Deo; Sukanya Kulkarni- Mone; Ashutosh Gowarikar; Prateeksha Lonkar; Sharvari Jamenis; Milind Gunaji; Yatin Karyekar; Nandu Madhav; Makarand Anaspure; Upendra Limaye; Pandit Sachin
- Cinematography: Debu Deodhar
- Edited by: Jafar Sultan
- Music by: Anand Modak
- Release date: 1998
- Country: India
- Language: Marathi

Sarkarnama (transl. Governmental Document) is an Indian Marathi film directed by Shravani Deodhar released in India in 1998. This movie is famous for the powerful performances of Dilip Prabhavalkar and Yashwant Dutt as political rivals.

== Plot ==
The film revolves around day-to-day political issues and corruption, centering on how some leaders make their money and lend support.

Vishwas Salunkhe (Ajinkya Deo) is a municipal assistant commissioner who is in charge of a Mumbai sub area where many chawl are in poor condition and he has posted notices to vacate those "Saptatara" where slabs and floors are partly collapsed and chawl-dwellers are not ready to vacate and chawl owners are not responding to the notices.

Salunkhe is not giving up on this issue, and Chief Minister Uttamrao Deshmukh (Yashvant Dutt), a chawl owner contact who has strong influence with him as a subscriber for the election fund, takes this issue seriously. Deshmukh calls Salunkhe and asks for the Saptatara file where all notices and documents are kept and hands him a special order to look after civil work in his future daughter-in-law's village's power supply. Salunkhe accepts the order and takes up duty at the village where he finds some residents, as their ancestral is being sold for electric towers and they become jobless, are opposing the order.

Meanwhile, Salunkhe receives news that Saptatara have collapsed. He immediately returns to Mumbai where he learns case file has vanished from the CM's office, but that the CM kept a copy in the bungalow where his son's marriage is taking place, as news correspondents Vaijayanti Patil (Ashwini Bhave) and Subodh Gore (Ashutosh Govarikar) come to cover the story of the event. Salunkhe asks his fiancée (Sukanya Kulkarni- Mone) to steal the file from CM's house and hand it over to him as he is suspended due to negligence of duties and is under depression so she agrees. While at a photo shoot Subodh Gore discovers something odd – laborers are doing odd work, such as carrying each other from one place to another. He shows this to Vaijayanti Patil, but she ignores it.

Much happens in one night as the CM's daughter-in-law is kidnapped by her boyfriend and a Minister (Dilip Prabhavalkar), who is the political rival of the CM slaughters sheep near the Ganesh mandir in a protest against the CM but Salunkhe has footage of the slaughter which he shows to the CM, but as reward the CM kills Subodh Gore and Vaijayanti Patil then takes shock of the footage when Salunkhe finds his case file and the footage is shown in the film's final Mumbai Mantralay scene.

== Cast ==
- Ashwini Bhave as Lokdhara Press Reporter Vaijayanti Patil
- Ajinkya Deo as Assistant Commissioner Vishwas Salunkhe
- Dilip Prabhavalkar as Minister
- Yashwant Dutt as Chief Minister Uttamrao Deshmukh
- Milind Gunaji as Minister's son Kumar Deshmukh
- Ashutosh Gowarikar as Shabda Communication Proprietor Subodh Gore
- Prateeksha Lonkar as Kumar's future wife Suchitra Patwardhan
- Upendra Limaye as Pandal (Mandap) Contractor/ Decorator Sapkale
- Anand Abhyankar as Lokdhara Editor Kshirsagar
- Yatin Karyekar as Anna PA Shrinivas Gokhale
- Smita Oak as Uttamrao Deshmukh Wife
- Shrikant Moghe as Patwardhan Suchitra's Father
- Sharvari Jamenis as Pratiksha Lonkar's friend Smita
- Nandu Madhav as Smita's brother Chander
- Makarand Anaspure as Chander's close pal Natha
- Sharad Vyas as Saptatara owner Mansukh Sharma
- Sukanya Kulkarni as Vishwas Salunkhe's fiance
- Haider Ali as Ajinkya Dev's office mate Srivastav
- Jayant Savarkar as Shripatrao Jamkhedkar
- Jagdish Patankar as Vikram Joshi Police Inspector
- Ravi Boratkar as Gandkhaazve, Vidarbha social worker

== Music ==
- "Alawar Tuzhi Chahool" (version 1) - Kavita Krishnamurthy
- "Alwar Tuzhi Chahool" (version 2) - Nobina Mirjankar
- "Mazya Swapnana Sath" - Nobina Mirjankar, Suresh Wadkar
- "Sasari Lek Nighali" - Nobina Mirjankar, Jayashri Shivram
- "Zakolala Zakolala" (Theme) - Ravindra Sathe

== Recognition ==
- 1998, won Filmfare Award
- 1998, won Screen Award - Best Film, Best Director
- 1998, won Maharashtra State Film Award
- 1998, nominated for V. Shantaram Award
