= Kanti Bhatt =

Gujarati writer (1931–2019)

- Born: 15 July 1931; Sathra, Bhavnagar State, British India
- Died: 4 August 2019 (aged 88); Mumbai, Maharashtra, India
- Citizenship: Indian
- Education: Maharaja Sayajirao University of Baroda
- Occupations: Author, journalist and columnist

Kanti Bhatt (15 July 1931 – 4 August 2019) was an Indian author, journalist and columnist who is estimated to have written more than 45,000 columns in several Gujarati publications. Bhatt became a journalist in 1966 and served as the subeditor of Vyapar in 1967. He later became a freelance journalist and wrote columns for several Gujarati publications including Chitralekha, Mumbai Samachar, Janshakti, Sandesh, Yuva Darshan and Jansatta. He worked in Kenya for some time in 1977. He was an investigative journalist and also wrote daily columns titled Aaspaas and Chetnani Kshane in Divya Bhaskar.

== Early life ==
Kanti Bhatt was born on 15 July 1931 in Sathra village in Bhavnagar State (now in Gujarat, India) to Hargovindbhai and Premkunwar. His family belonged to the Zanzmer village of Bhavnagar district in the Saurashtra region of Gujarat. He had four brothers and three sisters. Bhatt was an editor of a magazine titled Zankar at a high school in Mahuva. He earned a bachelor of commerce degree from the Maharaja Sayajirao University of Baroda in 1952.

== Career ==
Bhatt worked with the Bhavnagar municipality for some time. Following a bout of illness, he moved to naturopathy Ashram at Uruli Kanchan. He worked with his uncle's company (H.H.Bhatt Sdn. Bhd.) in Penang, Malaysia, for nine years when he travelled between India and Malaysia by sea seven times.

He first started out as a journalist in 1966 in Bombay. Bhatt then served as the subeditor of Vyapar in 1967. He later became a freelance journalist and wrote columns for several Gujarati publications including Chitralekha, Mumbai Samachar, Janshakti, Sandesh, Yuva Darshan, Jansatta. He worked in Kenya for some time in 1977. While working as an investigative journalist, he also wrote daily columns titled Aaspaas and Chetnani Kshane in Divya Bhaskar. Bhatt wrote short stories. According to an estimate reported in the Indian Express, Bhatt had written more than 45,000 articles.

Bhatt together with his wife Sheela launched a Gujarati magazine called Abhiyan.

== Personal life ==
Bhatt married Ranjan in the 1960s and divorced her in 1977. He married Sheela Bhatt, a journalist, in 1979. Sheela is a member of the Editors Guild of India. He had a daughter, Shakti, who died in 2007.

Bhatt died on 4 August 2019 in Mumbai. According to his associate, on 2 August, he suffered a stroke that caused damage to his heart, and died two days later.

== Legacy ==
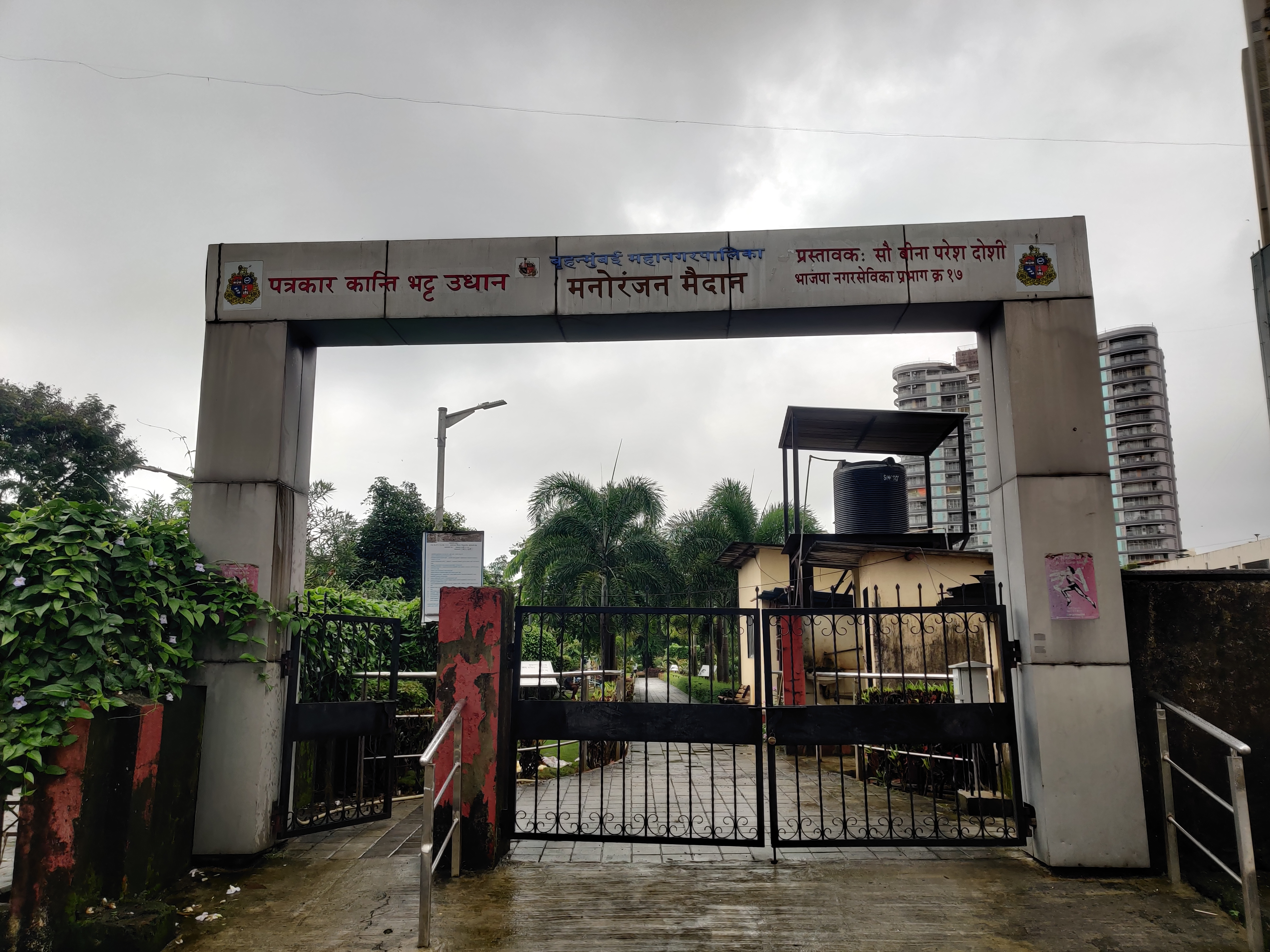
Patrakar Kanti Bhatt Garden, Kandivali, Mumbai

Indian Prime Minister Narendra Modi and Union Home Minister Amit Shah shared condolence messages on Twitter upon hearing of his death. Bhatt had mentored many young journalists. The formation of the Kanti Bhatt – Sheela Bhatt Foundation was announced by one of his students with an aim to help budding journalists.

== See also ==
- List of Gujarati-language writers
