= List of Marathi films of 1993 =

A list of films produced by the Marathi language film industry based in Maharashtra in the year 1993.

== 1993 Releases ==
A list of Marathi films released in 1993.

Year	Film	Director	Cast	Release Date	Producer	Notes	Source
1993
1993	Aapli Mansa	Sanjay Surkar	Prashant Damle, Mohan Joshi, Sudhir Joshi				
1993	Dharpakad	Usha Chavan	Ashok Saraf, Nilu Phule, Shrikant Moghe				
1993	Ghayaal	Purshottam Berde	Padma Chavan, Ajinkya Deo, Avinash Kharshikar	30 August 1993 (India)	N. Chandra		
1993	Lapandav	Shrabani Deodhar	Vandana Gupte, Ashok Saraf, Vikram Gokhale	16 April 1993 (India)	Everest Entertainment	National Film Award for Best Feature Film in Marathi in 1993	
1993	Lavanyavati	Anant Mane	Girish Oak, Varsha Sangamnerkar, Bhalchandra Kulkarni, Ganpat Patil, Alka Inamdar		The Bhatia Duo - Chelaram Bhatia and Lalchand Bhatia.		
1993	Saibaba	Babasaheb S. Fattelal	Lalita Pawar				
1993	Sawat Mazi Ladki	Smita Talvalkar	Ramesh Bhatkar, Prashant Damle, Mohan Joshi				
1993	Shivrayachi Soon Tararani	Dinkar D. Patil	Purshottam Berde, Satish Bodse, Krishnakant Dalvi		Arjun Films, Shree Rajyalakshmi Agencies		
1993	Shubhamkaroti	N. S. Vaidya					
1993	Wajva Re Wajva	Girish Ghanekar	Ashok Saraf, Prashant Damle, Ajinkya Deo				
1993	Yugpurush Dr. Babasaheb Ambedkar	Shashikant Nalavade	Premlata Mastakar, Dhansingh Yadav, Madha Gogate, Seema Ponkshe				
1993	Zapatlela	Mahesh Kothare	Laxmikant Berde, Mahesh Kothare, Kishori Ambiye				
1993	Zapatlelya Betawar	Surendra Talokar	Vijay Chavan, Sachin Khedekar	1 Jan 1993			
