= Pehchaan (2005 film) =

- Directed by: Shrabani Deodhar
- Written by: Faizal Akhtar; Shrabani Deodhar; Manoj Tyagi
- Produced by: Raveena Tandon; Prakash Khubchandani
- Starring: Raveena Tandon; Rati Agnihotri; Vinod Khanna; Sudhanshu Pandey
- Cinematography: Debu Deodhar
- Music by: Daboo Malik
- Production companies: Sahara One Motion Pictures; Reel Life Entertainment Pvt Ltd
- Distributed by: AA Films
- Release date: 24 June 2005
- Country: India
- Language: Hindi

Pehchaan: The Face of Truth is a Bollywood film that was released in 2005. The film directed by Shrabani Deodhar stars Vinod Khanna, Rati Agnihotri, and Raveena Tandon, who also produced the film.

== Plot ==
Mridula is a headstrong, opinionated girl who, along with her best friend Swati, go to college together. The two are close and do everything together. They successfully finish their education and go on to marry into their respective families. Mridula marries Milind D. Khanna, the son of top lawyer Deepak Khanna (Vinod Khanna), and Swati marries Ajay Lal, the son of a high-ranking politician.

Many years pass, and Mridula, now a lawyer, hears from a friend that Swati has committed suicide. Her friend tells her the circumstances surrounding her death, and Mridula suspects that Swati's death was far from suicide. Mridula gets hold of Swati's diary, in which she chronicles her daily thoughts. After reading the diary, Mridula is convinced that Swati was murdered by her in-laws and husband.

Determined to get justice for her deceased friend, Mridula decides to fight the case against the Lal family. Unfortunately, her father-in-law is fighting the case for the Lal's. Milind tries to convince Mridula to drop the case, but she refuses, causing a rift between husband and wife. During the rift, she finds support from her mother-in-law, Uttara Khanna (Rati Agnihotri), who urges her to fight for justice.

Mridula is caught between being a dutiful wife and a loyal friend. As she fights the case, her family and, more importantly, her unborn child are placed in danger by supporters of the Lal family.

== Cast ==
- Vinod Khanna as Advocate Deepak Khanna
- Rati Agnihotri as Uttara D. Khanna
- Raveena Tandon as Mridula Khanna
- Sudhanshu Pandey as Milind Khanna, Mridula's husband
- Rajinder Sharma as Dr. Sinha
- Juhi Parmar as Swati Lal
- Vineet Kumar as Hasmukh Lal
- Prabhat Bhattacharya as Ajay Lal
- Diwakar Pundir as Prasad Saxena

== Music ==
1. Dil De Dil Tu De De - Sunidhi Chauhan
2. Pal Hai Khushi - Kumar Sanu & Mahalakshmi Iyer
3. Sun Le Sun Le - N/A
4. Thode Se Paagal - N/A
