= Lapandav =

- Promotional release poster
- Directed by: Shrabani Deodhar
- Written by: Mangesh Kulkarni
- Produced by: Sachin Parekar; Sanjay Parekar
- Starring: Ashok Saraf; Vandana Gupte; Vikram Gokhale; Savita Prabhune; Ajinkya Deo; Varsha Usgaonkar; Sunil Barve; Pallavi Ranade
- Cinematography: Debu Deodhar
- Edited by: Dilip Kotalgi; Zafar Sultan
- Music by: Anand Modak
- Production company: Amol Production
- Distributed by: Everest Entertainment
- Release date: 16 April 1993 (Maharashtra)
- Country: India
- Language: Marathi

Lapandav (translation: Hide And Seek) is a 1993 Indian Marathi-language comedy film directed by Shrabani Deodhar, produced by Sachin Parekar and Sanjay Parekar under the banner of Amol Production, and distributed by Everest Entertainment. Released in Maharashtra on 16 April 1993, the film stars an ensemble cast of Ashok Saraf, Vandana Gupte, Vikram Gokhale, Savita Prabhune, Ajinkya Deo, Varsha Usgaonkar, Sunil Barve, and Pallavi Ranade.

== Synopsis ==
Abhijeet Samarth (Ashok Saraf), the lazy owner of a gymnasium, lives a wealthy lifestyle in Pune with his advocate wife, Asawari (Vandana Gupte), college-going daughter, Rasika (Varsha Usgaonkar), and widowed father (Bal Karve). Abhijeet's advocate friend, Anant Mahashabde (Vikram Gokhale), who is Asawari's colleague as well, also lives a wealthy lifestyle with his housewife, Ulka (Savita Prabhune), college-going son, Aseem (Sunil Barve), school-going daughter, Chinu (Sai Deodhar), and widowed mother (Tara Patkar). Anant meets Abhijeet and Asawari at their home every Saturday to enjoy drinks and share some poetry, while Rasika is dating Vikrant "Vicky" Malgude (Ajinkya Deo), the son of a wealthy corporator. Their harmonious lifestyle changes hilariously when both Abhijeet and Ulka come across two love letters apparently addressed to Asawari and Anant, respectively, and begin to suspect that their spouses are having an extramarital affair.

== Cast ==
- Ashok Saraf as Abhijeet Samarth
- Vandana Gupte as Advocate Asawari Samarth
- Vikram Gokhale as Advocate Anant Mahashabde
- Savita Prabhune as Ulka Anant Mahashabde
- Ajinkya Dev as Vikrant "Vicky" Malgude
- Varsha Usgaonkar as Rasika Abhijeet Samarth
- Sunil Barve as Aseem Anant Mahashabde
- Pallavi Ranade as Mugdha
- Bal Karve as Mr. Samarth (Abhijeet's father)
- Tara Patkar as Mrs. Mahashabde (Anant's mother)
- Sai Deodhar as Chinu Anant Mahashabde (Aseem's younger sister)
- Shriram Pendse as Mugdha's father
- Kishore Nandlaskar as Advocate Harkar (Anant and Asawari's colleague)
- Anand Ingle as Rangya (Aseem and Vicky's college friend)
- Paresh Mokashi as Aseem and Vicky's college friend
- Asawari Ghotikar as Harkar's client
- Sushma Deshpande as Anant and Asawari's client
- Haidar Ali as Pawandutt "Haidar Ali" (Abhijeet's friend)
- Pratibha Amrute as Asawari's client

== Soundtrack ==
The music was composed by Anand Modak while the lyrics were by Mangesh Kulkarni.

=== Track listing ===
No.	Title	Length
1.	"Teen Phulya Aani Teen Badam"	3:04
2.	"Attar Jate Udoon Mage Gandh Urava Tashi"	4:27
3.	"Tujhyat Jeev Guntala Kalel Ka Kadhi Tula"	4:04

== Recognition ==
- 1993, Shravani Deodhar won National Film Award's Silver Lotus for Best Marathi Feature Film for Lapandav.
