= Idi Maa Ashokgadi Love Story =

2003 film by Suresh Krishna

- Poster
- Directed by: Suresh Krishna
- Screenplay by: Suresh Krishna
- Dialogues by: Posani Krishna Murali
- Produced by: Harish Tavani; Akash Khurana
- Starring: Siva Balaji; Kanchi Kaul; Swetha Agarwal
- Edited by: Marthand K. Venkatesh
- Music by: Anand Milind
- Distributed by: Nimbus Motion Pictures
- Release date: 31 January 2003
- Country: India
- Language: Telugu

Idi Maa Ashokgadi Love Story (transl. This is our Ashok's love story) is a 2003 Telugu film directed by Suresh Krishna and starring Siva Balaji, Kanchi Kaul and Swetha Agarwal in the lead roles. The film was released to mixed reviews.

== Cast ==
- Siva Balaji as Ashok Varma
- Kanchi Kaul as Mahalakshmi
- Swetha Agarwal as Deepali
- Manoj Biddvai as Vinod
- Chandra Mohan
- Vizag Prasad
- Siva Reddy
- Uttej
- Sana as Ashok's mother

== Soundtrack ==
All music is composed by Anand Milind.

No.	Title	Artist(s)	Length
1.	"Aatallo Athletic"	KK	4:47
2.	"Chali Chaligaa"	KK, Sowmya Raoh	5:35
3.	"Neeku Manansista"	Abhijeet Bhattacharya, Sadhna Sargam	3:58
4.	"Malli Janmista"	KK	5:39
5.	"Seetakoka Chilakala"	Abhijeet Bhattacharya, Sadhana Sargam	5:03
6.	"Vasantala Ee Gali Lo"	Abhijeet Bhattacharya	4:05

== Reception ==
Jeevi of Idlebrain.com rated the film 2/5 and wrote, "This film has everything in right proportions - soulful music, stylish taking, exotic artwork, good choreography, neat dialogues. But what it lacks is soul and substance". A critic from Telugucinema.com wrote, "The director totally failed in the story, screenplay & Direction departments in the second half by including lot of elements. But the taking of this love story is totally different from an ordinary Telugu Film and gives a different experience when seeing the film. Music was the big asset of the film".
