= Sai Deodhar =

Indian actress

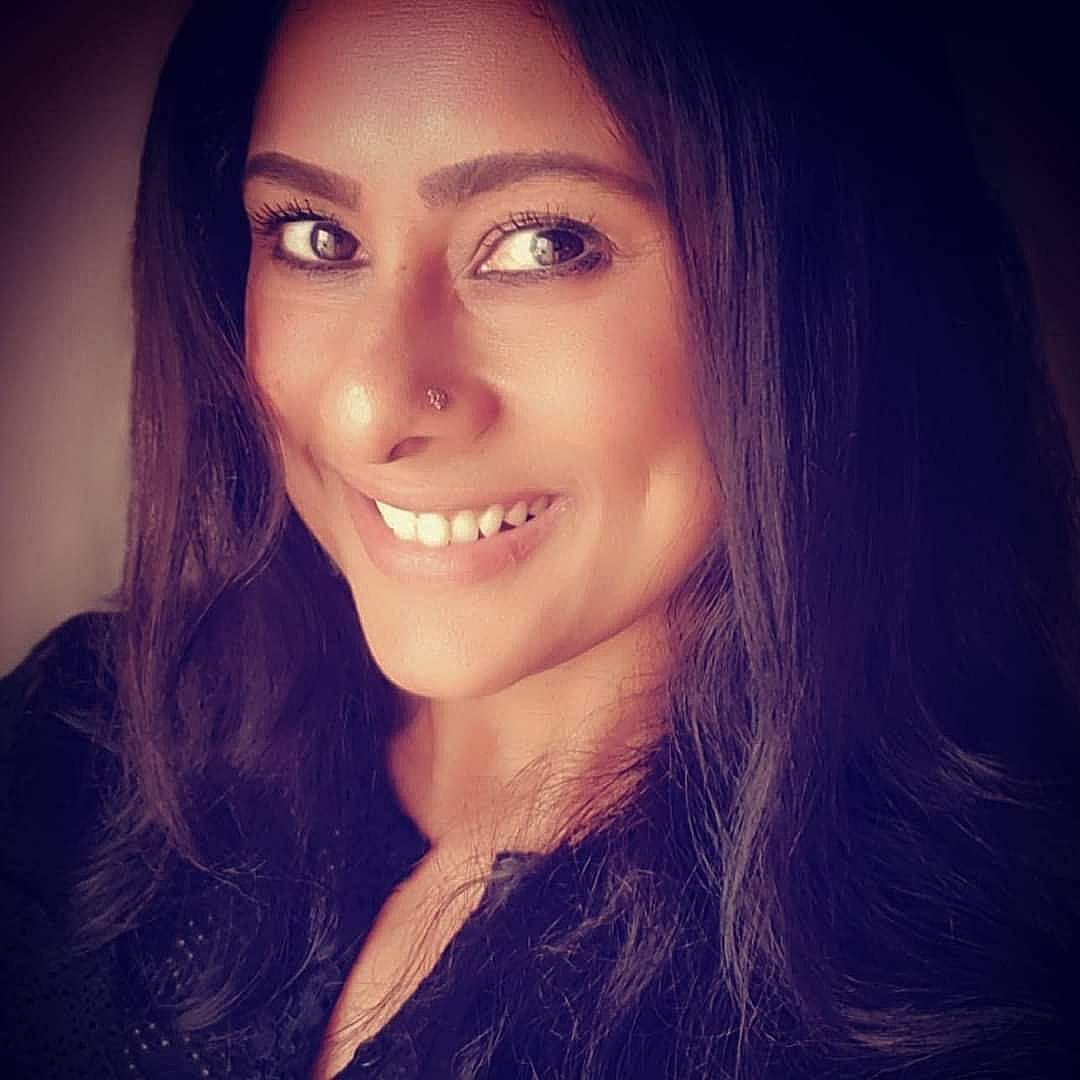
- Born: 21 April
- Occupations: Actress; producer; writer; director
- Years active: 1991–present
- Spouse: Shakti Anand (m. 2005)
- Children: 1
- Parents: Debu Deodhar (father); Shrabani Deodhar (mother)

Sai Deodhar (born 21 April) Is an Indian actress who primarily works in Hindi television. She is best known for portraying Flight Lieutenant Monica Singh Kochar in Saara Akaash, Ananya Sachdev Samarth in Ek Ladki Anjaani Si, and Kasturi Singh in Udaan. For Saara Akaash, she received a nomination for the Indian Telly Award for Fresh New Face – Female.

== Life and family ==
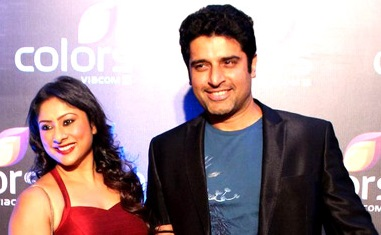
Sai with her Husband Shakti Anand at an event

Deodhar's father, cinematographer Debu Deodhar, was Marathi, and her mother, director Shrabani Deodhar, is Bengali. Deodhar married her Saara Akaash co-star, Shakti Anand, in 2005. She gave birth to their daughter in 2011.

== Filmography ==
=== Films ===
- All films are in Marathi unless otherwise noted.

Year	Title	Role	Notes	Ref.
1991	Prahaar: The Final Attack	Chiku	Hindi film	
1993	Lapandav	Chinu Mahashabde		
1996	Daayraa	Munni	Hindi film	
2019	Mogra Phulaalaa	Shivangi Kulkarni		

=== Television ===
Year	Title	Role	Notes	Ref.
2003–2005	Saara Akaash	Flight Lieutenant Monica Singh Kochar		
2004–2005	Saara Akaash	Shazia Khan		
2005	Siddhanth	Hemangi Mathur		
2005	Nach Baliye 1	Contestant	8th place	
2005	CID	Inspector Priyanka		
2006	Kasautii Zindagii Kay	Debonita		
2006–2007	Ek Ladki Anjaani Si	Ananya "Anu" Sachdev Samarth		
2007	Don	Unknown		
2010	Kashi – Ab Na Rahe Tera Kagaz Kora	Ishwari		
2010–2011	Baat Hamari Pakki Hai	Nidhi Saurabh Jaiswal		
2012	Upanishad Ganga	Devayani	Episode 8: "Upaveda: Story of Kacha & Devayani"	
2012	Upanishad Ganga	Savitri	Episode 28: "Anatman: Not the Self Abhimanyu & Savitri"	
2012	Upanishad Ganga	Gargi	Episode 30: "The Existence Principle: Yagyavalkya & Gargi	
2012	Upanishad Ganga	Nati	Episode 33: "Bondage: Camel's Rope"	
2014	Adaalat	Advocate Soundarya Sharma		
2014–2018	Udaan	Kasturi Bhuvan Singh		
2015	Dil Ki Baatein Dil Hi Jaane	Barkha		
2016	Darr Sabko Lagta Hai	Sunita	Episode 24	
2017	Savdhaan India	Sunaina Surajpratap Singh	Episode 2158	
2023; 2024	Dabangii – Mulgii Aayi Re Aayi	Damini "Chhaya" Rajyavadhkar		
2025	Ghum Hai Kisikey Pyaar Meiin	Mukta Chavan		
2026	Juhi Mui	Suchitra Rajendra Suri		

=== Special appearances ===
Year	Title	Role	Notes
2006	Reth	Tanu	
2006	Jodee Kamaal Ki	Herself	Episode 2
2006	Kkavyanjali	Debonita	
2006	Kahaani Ghar Ghar Kii	Debonita	Episode 1158
2006	Jeena Isi Ka Naam Hai	Herself	Episode 9
2019	Kitchen Champion 5	Herself	

Laughter chef 2026

=== Web series ===
Year	Title	Role	Notes	Ref.
2024	Maeri	Tara Deshpande	ZEE5's series	

=== Director ===
- D.A.T.E.
- Silent Ties
- Fathers Day To You (Pocket Films)
- Blood Relation
- When A Man Loves A Woman
- Badhai Ho
- Worship The Woman Within - International Women's Day Anthem"
- Jhooti Jhooti Batiyaan - music video
- (Un)Sanskari - Short Film
- Na avadti goshta
- Bina shakkar ki chai

=== Producer ===
- Mujhse Kuchh Kehti...Yeh Khamoshiyaan (2012-2013)- TV show on Star Plus
- Sata Lota Pan Sagla Khota (2015) - film
- D.A.T.E. (2018)
- The Sholay Girl (2019)
- Blood Relation (2020)
- When A Man Loves A Woman - short film (2021)
- Badhai Ho (short film) (2021)
- Worship The Woman Within - International Women's Day Anthem" (music video) (2021)
- Jhooti Jhooti Batiyaan - music video
- (Un)Sanskari - short film
- Sonyachi Pavla - TV show on Colors Marathi
- KavyaAnjali - Sakhi Savali - TV show on Colors Marathi
