= Maeri =

2024 Indian TV series

- Genre: Crime drama
- Directed by: Sachin Darekkar
- Country of origin: India
- Original language: Hindi
- No. of seasons: 1

Production
- Producer: Sachin Darekkar
- Production company: Zenith Pictures

Original release
- Network: ZEE5
- Release: 6 December 2024

Maeri is an Indian crime drama series directed and produced by Sachin Darekkar under Zenith Pictures. It stars Sai Deodhar as Tara Deshpande, a mother fighting for justice after her daughter's tragic gang rape. The cast also includes Tanvi Mundle, Chinmay Mandlekar, Bhushan Patil, and Sagar Deshmukh. The trailer was released in November 2024, and the series premiered on ZEE5 on 6 December 2024.

== Plot summary ==
Set in Mumbai, the narrative follows the middle-class Deshpande family, consisting of Hemant (Sagar Deshmukh), his wife Tara (Sai Deodhar), and their daughter Manu (Tanvi Mundle). Their lives are upended when Manu is brutally gang-raped and left on the roadside, echoing the infamous Nirbhaya case. The perpetrators, led by Rohit Jamwal (Yash Malhotra), are entitled men from influential backgrounds. Tara's relentless quest for justice turns into a gripping battle against a corrupt system.

== Cast and characters ==
- Sai Deodhar as Tara Deshpande
- Sagar Deshmukh as Hemant Deshpande
- Tanvi Mundle as Manasvi Deshpande (Manu)
- Aryan Rajput as Aditya Jamwal
- Tejas Raut as Vikram Bhalla
- Ashish Gade as Varun Joshi
- Pratiksha Kote as Jadhav
- Yash Malhotra as Rohit Jamwal
- Chinmay Mandlekar as ACP Khandekar
- Bhushan Patil as Patil
- Ankita Lande as Madhu

== Episodes ==
No.	Title	Directed by	Original release date
1	"Anhoni"	Sachin Darekkar	6 December 2024
Tara and Hemant, a content middle-class couple, center their lives around their daughter, Manasvi. A college student, Manasvi's life takes an unexpected turn after she rejects a proposal from her classmate, Rohit.
2	"Zakhm"	Sachin Darekkar	6 December 2024
Rohit and his friends abduct Manasvi, leaving her parents, Tara and Hemant, worried when she doesn't return on time. Their worst fears come true when they find her severely injured, clinging to life.
3	"Andha Kanoon"	Sachin Darekkar	6 December 2024
Manasvi decides against filing a complaint or pursuing legal action, a choice Hemant supports. While Tara fears the social stigma that could tarnish Manasvi's name, she remains determined to fight for justice.
4	"Jaal"	Sachin Darekkar	6 December 2024
Under the guidance of Shubhankar Pandit, Tara secretly begins her fight against the four perpetrators. She targets Rohit first, ensnaring him in a scandal. Shortly after, Rohit and his cousin Aditya are found dead.
5	"Pratishodh"	Sachin Darekkar	6 December 2024
Tara notices a change in Manasvi's behavior but faces new challenges as ACP Avinash starts investigating Rohit's death. Meanwhile, Vikram admits his role in the crime, adding another twist to the battle for justice.
6	"Chunauti"	Sachin Darekkar	6 December 2024
Vikram is arrested for assaulting Manasvi and reveals the involvement of Varun Joshi, the son of a prominent lawyer. In response, Varun's father, Jayesh, approaches Tara and Hemant, offering a settlement.
7	"Ant-Yudh"	Sachin Darekkar	6 December 2024
Hemant, Tara, and Manasvi plan a weekend getaway to a remote location. During their time there, Tara reveals her role in the incidents involving Rohit and Aditya. The situation takes a dramatic turn when Varun arrives at the bungalow for a final confrontation.

== Release ==
Maeri was released for streaming on ZEE5 on 6 December 2024.

== Critical reception ==
Archika Khurana of the Times of India rated the series 3.0 stars, commenting: "If you enjoy stories of maternal resilience, Maeri provides enough drama to engage, but it may leave you wishing for a more impactful execution."

Arpita Sarkar of OTTplay also gave the series 3.0 stars, stating: "Sai Deodhar impresses as a protective mother in a predictable but heartwarming story."
