= Woh Tera Naam Tha =

- Directed by: Kuku Kohli
- Written by: Tanveer Khan (dialogues)
- Story by: J. P. Chowskey
- Produced by: Vijaypath Singhania
- Starring: Arjan Bajwa; Kanchi Kaul; Amrish Puri; Rajat Bedi; Gaurav Chanana
- Cinematography: Manmohan Singh
- Edited by: Sanjay Jaiswal
- Music by: Dilip Sen-Sameer Sen, Roop Kumar Rathod, Sumeet Chopra
- Production company: Radha Krishna Films
- Release date: 30 January 2004
- Country: India
- Language: Hindi

Woh Tera Naam Tha is a 2004 Indian Hindi-language film starring Arjan Bajwa, Kanchi Kaul and Amrish Puri. The music was composed by Roop Kumar Rathod. The cinematographer was by Manmohan Singh.

== Synopsis ==
Orphaned at a very young age, Badruddin "Badru" is taken in by the kind-hearted Ustad Samad Khan, a once popular singer in Bhopal, Madhya Pradesh. Samad, once well known for his performances, gave up singing after he found his audience to be distracted during one of his shows.

Badru is attracted to Samad's daughter, Reshma, who also likes him. Badru has another admirer in the beautiful Naseem, but does not reciprocate her love. When Akhtar, a freelance photographer from Delhi, arrives, Reshma and he instantly fall in love, and Badru is heartbroken.

When Akhtar proposes marriage, Samad angrily rejects him, as he wants Reshma to marry Nawab Hyder Ali's son, Basharat. His angry outburst has repercussions and Samad is hospitalized. To raise money for his treatment, Reshma decides to take part in a singing competition and wins. Samad returns home to start preparations for Reshma's marriage but to his astonishment, he discovers that Reshma has already turned down Basharat's proposal. Basharat decides to take matters into his own hands and tries to forcibly marry Reshma.

== Cast ==
- Arjan Bajwa as Akhtar
- Kanchi Kaul as Reshma Khan
- Amrish Puri as Ustad Samad Khan, Reshma's father
- Gaurav Chanana as Badruddin "Badru"
- Rajat Bedi as Basharat
- Shalini Pal as Naseem

== Reception ==
Taran Adarsh wrote that "On all, 'Woh Tera Naam Tha' is a formulaic film but it was mentioned that "given mentality of current audiences, a subject like this will hardly find takers" . A critic from Deccan Herald wrote that "It remains to be seen whether Singhania’s prowess in the industrial field will repeat itself in Bollywood".

== Music ==
1. "Ashqaan Di" – Reshma
2. "Baju Band" – Pt. Rajan Mishra
3. "Jaan Lo Jaan Lo (Qawwali)" – Sadhana Sargam, Sabri Brothers
4. "Kabhi Dil Se Kam" – Udit Narayan, Alka Yagnik
5. "Noor-E-Nazar' – Roop Kumar Rathod
6. "Sajan Ghar Challi Re" – Alka Yagnik, Richa Sharma
7. "Subah Hui" – Alka Yagnik
8. "Woh Jo Jaan-E-Jaan" – Hariharan
9. "Woh Tera Naam Tha" – Roop Kumar Rathod
10. "Woh Tera Naam Tha (Sad)" – Roop Kumar Rathod
11. "Youn To Mohabbat Ka" – Udit Narayan, Alka Yagnik
