= Chitralekha (weekly) =

Gujarati and Marathi weekly magazine

- Former editors: Harkisan Mehta (1958–1998)
- Categories: News magazine
- Frequency: Weekly
- Founded: 1950
- Language: Gujarati; Marathi
- Website: www.chitralekha.com

Chitralekha is a weekly news magazine published in Gujarati and Marathi.

== History and profile ==
Chitralekha's first issue was published in 1950, under the editorship of Vaju Kotak. The magazine is part of the Chitralekha Group from Mumbai, Maharashtra, India. It is jointly published by Chitralekha and #BANNER1 & # Group.

It has given rise to many prominent Gujarati columnists including Kanti Bhatt, Chandrakant Bakshi, Tarak Mehta, and others. After the death of founding editor Vaju Kotak in 1959, Madhuri Kotak took charge of the magazine along with Harkisan Mehta, who edited it till 1998.

The Chitralekha Group publishes several other magazines, including Watch World (a niche magazine focused on Watches) and BTW (By The Way - a lifestyle magazine circulated with Chitralekha Gujarati).

A US edition of Chitralekha was launched in 2006 and was based in Maryland.

On 20 April 2011, the Indian Postal Service issued a Rs. 5 commemorative postage stamp honouring Chitralekha.

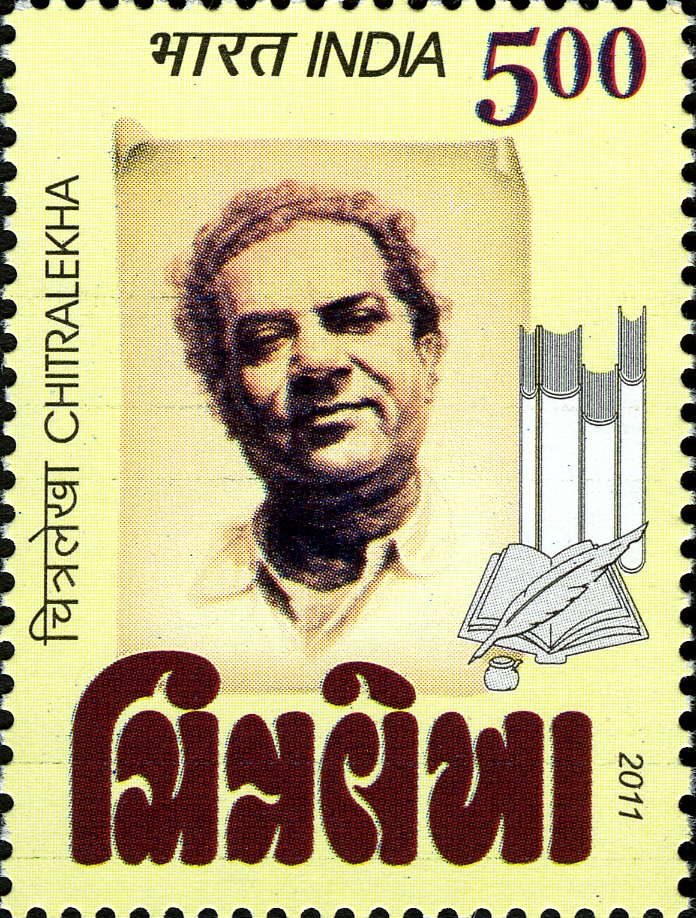
