= Shrabani Deodhar =

Indian film director and screenwriter

- Born: 12 June 1962 (age 64); Calcutta, West bengal, India
- Years active: 1993 to present
- Notable work: Lapandav (1993)
- Spouse: Debu Deodhar (m. 1981; death 2010)
- Children: Sai Deodhar (daughter)
- Awards: National Film Award for "Best Marathi Feature Film"

Shrabani Deodhar is an Indian film director and screenwriter who won the National Film Award for her very first project, the 1993 Marathi language feature film Lapandav.

== Background ==
Shrabani Deodhar was born in a Marathi family. She has no formal training as a filmmaker. Her parents were both doctors, and she concedes that her filmmaking knowledge came from her husband, cinematographer Debu Deodhar. He advised she combines the sciences of what goes on behind-the-camera with that of motion pictures, and encouraged her to take film appreciation courses at the Film and Television Institute of India in Pune to pursue her wish to become a filmmaker. He worked with her on her very first film, and with her on every one of her projects before she created Sata Lota Pan Sagla Khota.

Dedhar was slated to direct the upcoming Sugar, Salt Ani Prem for writer/producer Sonali Bangera, but when she chose to leave the project due to personal issues, Bangera opted to direct the film herself. She recently completed work on Sata Lota Pan Sagla Khota, which is expected for release November 2014. Deodhar related that she conceived the idea before Rohit Shetty became a film director and that while she intended to make the film "years ago", due to personal issues surrounding her husband's death in 2010, production was held off for four years. Her daughter Sai Deodhar encouraged her mother to consider the changes in Indian film industry during her four-year absence from filmmaking and move forward, resulting Shrabani's decision to use a younger set of actors for Stat Lota. Deodhar is a creative director for Star Pravah and is on the jury of the 14th Indian Television Academy Awards. She has plans to make additional films in both the Hindi and Bengali languages.

== Filmography ==
- Lapandav (1993)
- Sarkarnama (1998)
- Silsila Hai Pyar Ka (1999) (and as writer)
- Lekaru (The Child) (2000)
- Penchaan (2005) (and as writer)
- Sata Lota Pan Sagla Khota (2014)
- Dekhaa Jaayega (2015)
- The Sholay Girl (2019)
- Mogra Phulaalaa (2019)

== Recognition ==
- 1993, won National Film Award's Silver Lotus for 'Best Marathi Feature Film" for her first film, Lapandav.
- 1998, won Filmfare Award for Sarkarnama
- 1998, won Screen Award for Sarkarnama
- 1998, won Maharashtra State Film Award for Sarkarnama
- 1998, nominated for V. Shantaram Award for Sarkarnama
- 2000, won Maharashtra State Film Award for Lekaru'
- 2000, won Hollywood Award for Lekhru
