= Silsila Hai Pyar Ka =

1999 Hindi-language romance film

- Directed by: Shrabani Deodhar
- Written by: K. K. Singh (dialogue)
- Screenplay by: Robin Bhatt; Akash Khurana
- Story by: Shrabani Deodhar
- Produced by: N. N. Sippy
- Starring: Karishma Kapoor; Chandrachur Singh; Danny Denzongpa
- Cinematography: Debu Deodhar
- Edited by: Waman B. Bhosle
- Music by: Jatin–Lalit; Babloo Chakravorty (background music)
- Production company: N. N. Sippy Productions
- Release date: 8 April 1999
- Country: India
- Language: Hindi

Silsila Hai Pyar Ka is a 1999 Hindi romance film directed by Shrabani Deodhar and starring Karishma Kapoor, Chandrachur Singh and Danny Denzongpa. The supporting cast includes Shakti Kapoor, Alok Nath, Johnny Lever, Aruna Irani, Tiku Talsania, Dina Pathak, Nilam Singh, Mishkaa Khanna and Ali Haider. A large portion of the film of the film was shot in Gstaad, Switzerland.

== Plot ==
Vanshika Mathur, an orphan who lives with her aunt, is a simple middle-class girl desperately in search of a job. Eventually she gets a job with Mr. Sinha, a very successful businessman. Mr. Sinha is a widower who has a son Abhay. Abhay has grown up with his maternal uncle, Rakesh, a four-time divorce, whose motto is "Stay unmarried and lead a Bohemian lifestyle". Abhay is strongly influenced by his uncle and has grown into a flamboyant, arrogant, spoilt brat who has never put in a day's work at the family business. Mr. Sinha is obviously perturbed to the point of distress by the lifestyle his son leads – partying all night and sleeping through the day. He is determined to get his son back on the right track. In order to get Abhay into the office, he entices him with the idea of a young female secretary. He succeeds. Abhay meets Vanshika at the office. He is disgusted. She is flustered, but hopelessly in love. The rest of the film is a roller-coaster ride – a clash of the value system of the idealistic Vanshika and the non-existent morals of the wayward Abhay.

== Cast ==
- Karishma Kapoor as Vanshika Mathur
- Chandrachur Singh as Abhay
- Aruna Irani as Shakuntala Devi
- Shakti Kapoor as Rakesh
- Danny Denzongpa as Jabbar Khagoshi
- Alok Nath as Mr. Sinha
- Tiku Talsania as Krupa Shankar
- Dina Pathak as Abhay's grandmother
- Johnny Lever as Johny (special appearance)

== Soundtrack ==
All songs are composed by Jatin-Lalit and penned by Sameer.

#	Title	Singer(s)	Length
1	"Yeh Dil Deewana"	Kumar Sanu, Anuradha Paudwal	04:54
2	"Padosan Ke Ghar"	Anuradha Paudwal	04:04
3	"Suno Suno Ladkiyon"	Amit Kumar	06:21
4	"Yeh Silsila Hai Pyar Ka"	Kumar Sanu, Alka Yagnik	04:35
5	"Ae Mama Haan Bhanje"	Udit Narayan, Vinod Rathod	04:45
6	"Aaj Raat Aayega Mazaa"	Chithra	04:57
7	"Lo Lo Jee Main Aagayee"	Alka Yagnik	04:40
8	"Yeh Silsila Hai Pyar Ka" (Instrumental)		04:13
9	"Yeh Dil Deewana" (Instrumental)		04:54

== Reception ==
Kavitha K of Deccan Herald wrote that "Danny’s the surprise package. That man is classy. Talking of class, check out the film’s website www.silsilahaipyarka.com. It’s snazzy and smart. Quite unlike the film". Sharmila Taliculam of Rediff.com wrote, "Flashes of Deodhar's skills show in the good cinematography, choreography and acting. Despite all this, what looks like an attempt at going commercial did her in. See what she did with the storyline..."
