= Shakti Anand =

Indian television actor

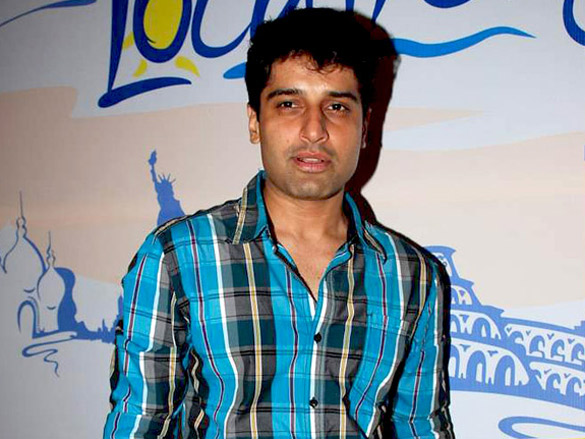
- Anand in 2012
- Born: 23 September 1975 (age 50); Delhi, India
- Occupation: Television actor
- Years active: 2000–present
- Spouse: Sai Deodhar (m. 2005)
- Children: 1

Shakti Anand (born 23 September 1975) is an Indian television actor, best known for his role as Hemant Virani in the StarPlus blockbuster soap opera Kyunki Saas Bhi Kabhi Bahu Thi and its sequel Kyunki Saas Bhi Kabhi Bahu Thi 2. He also appeared in various television shows likeTenali Rama, Saara Akaash, Sambhav Asambhav and Ek Ladki Anjaani Si. The actor also hosted the first season of the crime reality show Crime Patrol in 2004.

== Early life and education ==
Anand was born on 23 September 1975 in Delhi in a Punjabi family. He studied at the Tamil Education Association university in Delhi and majored in the Science stream. After that, he received his master's degree in pharmaceutical engineering.

== Personal life ==
Anand married actress Sai Deodhar in 2005. They have a daughter born in 2011.

== Career ==
Shakti received the offer to act in the television show Kyunki Saas Bhi Kabhi Bahu Thi while he was working as a medical examiner with GE Capital in Delhi. He played a blind boy in telefilm Nayan Jyoti, produced by Deepak Sharma and edited by Sanjeev Khanna for Doordarshan.

Shakti and his wife Sai Deodhar participated in the first season of the celebrity dance show Nach Baliye. In the serial Godh Bharaai, he performed as the character Shivam. The actor had worked in the daily soap called Bharat Ka Veer Putra – Maharana Pratap as Maharana Udai Singh. He has also worked in the show SuperCops vs Supervillains on Life OK. Shakti was also seen as Shiv in the show Gangaa on &TV and as Emperor Balakumara in popular Tenali Rama aired on Sony SAB. Anand was last seen playing Amber Singh, in the show Channa Mereya that aired on Star Bharat.

Since March 2023 he portrayed Karan Luthra replacing Shakti Arora opposite Shraddha Arya post generation leap in Zee TV's Kundali Bhagya until the show off-aired in December 2024. Since July 2025, he reprised his role of Advocate Hemant Virani in the StarPlus's spiritual sequel of Kyunki Saas Bhi Kabhi Bahu Thi, entitled Kyunki Saas Bhi Kabhi Bahu Thi 2.

Since January 2026, he played Mahadev in Colors TV's Mahadev & Sons.

== Filmography ==
=== Television ===
Year	Serial	Role	Notes	Ref.
2000	Aakash	Sunny		
2000	X Zone	Rakesh Jindal	Episode 120: Saheli	
2000	Thriller At 10	Rohan Lal	Episode 131 to Episode 135: Maksad : Part 1 to Part 5	
2000–2004	Kyunki Saas Bhi Kabhi Bahu Thi	Hemant Virani		
2001–2002	Sansaar	Amit		
2002–2003	Ssshhhh...Koi Hai	Captain Kishan		
2003	Sambhav Asambhav	Siddharth Nath		
2003–2005	Saara Akaash	Flight Lt. Vikram Kochar / Squadron Leader Vikram Kochar		
2004–2006	Crime Patrol	Host		
2005	Kkusum	Party Host (Episode 821)	Special Guest	
2005–2007	Ek Ladki Anjaani Si	Nikhil Samarth		
2006	C.I.D.	Nikhil Samarth	Episode 427: 60 Feet Underwater	
2009	Specials @ 10			
2009	Sssshhh...Phir Koi Hai – Drishti: Part 2 to Part 8	Dr. Aashish Verma (Episode 203 to Episode 209)		
2009	Sssshhh...Phir Koi Hai – Drishti: Part 2 to Part 8	Nitin Kapoor (Episode 209)		
2009	Bhaskar Bharti	Omkar Sinha		
2010	Godh Bharaai	Shivam Agnihotri		
2013–2015	Bharat Ka Veer Putra – Maharana Pratap	Maharana Uday Singh		
2014	Savdhaan India	Bharat Gupta (Episode 936)		
2015	Aahat	Shekhar	Episode 1: Lori	
2015–2016	SuperCops vs Supervillains	Commander Jagatveer Rana		
2015–2016	Balika Vadhu	MLA Dr. Jagdish "Jagya" Singh		
2017	Gangaa	Shiv Jha		
2017	Savdhaan India	Surajpratap Singh	Episode 2158	
2018	Mayavi Maling	Maharaj Shiladitya		
2018–2019	Vish Ya Amrit: Sitara	Ratanpratap Singh		
2019	Crime Alert	Host		
2019–2020	Tenali Rama	Maharaj Balakumaran		
2020–2021	Hamari Wali Good News	Mukund Tiwari		
2022	Channa Mereya	Amber Singh		
2023–2024	Kundali Bhagya	Karan Luthra		
2025	Kumkum Bhagya	Karan Luthra		
2025–2026	Kyunki Saas Bhi Kabhi Bahu Thi 2	Advocate Hemant Virani		
2026–present	Kyunki Rishton Ke Bhi Roop Badalte Hain	Advocate Hemant Virani		
2026–present	Mahadev & Sons	Mahadev		

=== Films ===
Year	Film	Role	Notes
2008	Ghar Anudha		Supporting Role
2013	Prateek Group		
2014	Arsho	Jeet	Supporting Role
2015	I Love Desi	Punjab's Brother	Supporting Role
	Dekhaa Jaayega		

=== Web series ===
Year	Serial	Role	Notes
2020	Naxalbari	Binu Atram	Supporting Role
2021	The Chargesheet: Innocent or Guilty?	Sanjeev Singh	Supporting Role
2023	School of Lies	Dev (Episode 1 & Episode 3)	Supporting Role

=== Short films ===
Year	Film	Role	Channel
2019	D.A.T.E.	Neel Sharma	ZEE5

=== Reality shows ===
Year	Show	Role	Channel
2005	Nach Baliye 1	Contestant	Star One
2006	Jodee Kamal Ki	Guest (Episode 2)	Star Plus
2006	Jeena Isi Ka Naam Hai	Guest (Episode 9)	Zee TV
2007–2008	Good Morning Zindagi	Host	9X
2013	Sanjeev Kapoor Ke Kitchen Khiladi	Guest Contestant (Episode 40)	Sony Entertainment Television
2019	Kitchen Champion 5	Guest Contestant (Episode 45)	Colors TV
