= Ghulami =

1985 Hindi-language Indian feature film directed by J. P. Dutta

- Theatrical release poster
- Directed by: J. P. Dutta
- Screenplay by: J. P. Dutta
- Dialogues by: O. P. Dutta
- Story by: J. P. Dutta
- Produced by: Habib Nadiadwala; Faruq Nadiadwala
- Starring: Dharmendra; Mithun Chakraborty; Naseeruddin Shah; Kulbhushan Kharbanda; Smita Patil; Reena Roy; Anita Raj; Raza Murad
- Narrated by: Amitabh Bachchan
- Cinematography: Ishwar R. Bidri
- Edited by: Deepak Y. Wirkud; M. D. Worlikar
- Music by: Laxmikant–Pyarelal
- Production company: Base Industries Group
- Distributed by: Nadiadwala Sons
- Release date: 28 June 1985
- Running time: 171 minutes
- Country: India
- Language: Hindi

Ghulami (transl. Slavery) is a 1985 Indian Hindi-language action drama film directed by J. P. Dutta (in his directorial debut). The film features an ensemble cast of Dharmendra, Mithun Chakraborty, Naseeruddin Shah, Kulbhushan Kharbanda, Smita Patil, Reena Roy, Anita Raj, Raza Murad and Om Shivpuri. The lyrics of the songs were penned by Gulzar and the music was composed by Laxmikant–Pyarelal, who would go on to collaborate with Dutta in all his films until Kshatriya (1993). It was shot at Fatehpur, Rajasthan. Amitabh Bachchan narrated the film.

The film, which portrays the caste system in Rajasthan, lead to communal riots in many small cities of the state.

== Plot ==
The film focuses on the caste and feudal system in Rajasthan. Ranjit Singh Chaudhary is the son of a Jat landless peasant, living in a village which is dominated by a rich zamindar landlord Rajput Thakur family. As a teenager studying in the village school, Ranjit is rebellious and defiant against deep-rooted caste prejudices and discriminatory practices. He is bullied by the two sons of the landlord, who are of his own age. Two girls who also study in the same school are sympathetic to Ranjit. These are the daughter of the schoolmaster and the daughter of the rich landlord (sister of the bullies). Sick of the exploitation he sees around him, Ranjit runs away to the city.

Several years later, Ranjit's father dies, and a telegram summons Ranjit back to the village to perform the last rites. Ranjit returns to find that nothing has changed in the village. He is also told that his father had taken loans from the landlord to pay for his medicines and healthcare, and that Ranjit is now required to repay those loans, or forfeit his lands and house, which were the collateral for the loan. Ranjit feels that this is a great injustice. His logic of reasoning is that the peasants have been tilling the land and working hard for many generations, that the landlord only owns the land and does no work, and therefore, if the landlord has lent money to a peasant, the loan does not need to be paid back. A long and emotional monologue delineates this logic for the benefit of the viewers.

The circumstances clearly call for class war and revolution, which Ranjit duly proceeds to ignite. He begins by storming into the landlord's living room, accusing him and his ancestors of being blood-suckers, and challenging him to take possession of the mortgaged land if he dares. The landlord's daughter, who listens from behind a door, is deeply impressed by the scene created by her old schoolmate. Ranjit then retires to his house to perform his father's funeral, and bonds with his other friend, Moran. The stage is set for a love triangle and for a revolutionary vendetta.

The love triangle is, however, resolved very quickly. The landlord's sons attempt to rape Moran. She is rescued by Ranjit, who then marries her because she clearly needs a protector. The disappointed Sumitra then agrees to marry the police officer chosen by her father, the landlord. She, however, carried her unrequited love in her heart, and her husband soon discovered that she had been in love with this other man. He is incensed and joins hands with his two evil brothers-in-law in their bid to finish Ranjit. By this time, after a random gunfight or two, once over the fact that the landlord's men were collecting their share of the harvest from the village peasants, Ranjit had become a fugitive from the law. Therefore, the police can go after him, beat him up in jail, and so on.

The rest of the movie comprises general bloodletting. Ranjit is supported in his vendetta by Javar, a villager who has returned home after serving in the army, and by Gopi Dada, the village police havaldar, whose son had been murdered by the landlord's henchmen for daring to ride a horse on his wedding day despite being from a lower caste. The film ends with the slaughter of most of the protagonists on both sides. The violent climax underscores the truth that the rebels always die, but they succeed in making remarkable changes to the system that made them slaves for years.

== Cast ==
The cast has been listed below:

- Dharmendra as Ranjit Singh Choudhary
- Mithun Chakraborty as Javar Pratap
- Naseeruddin Shah as Thakur Sultan Singh
- Kulbhushan Kharbanda as Havaldar Gopi Dada
- Smita Patil as Sumitra
- Reena Roy as Moran Singh Choudhary
- Anita Raj as Tulsi
- Raza Murad as Fatehpur's Thanedar
- Om Shivpuri as Bade Thakur
- Avtar Gill as Shaamu
- Bharat Kapoor as Thakur Shakti Singh
- Mazhar Khan as Thakur Jaswant Singh
- Sulochana Latkar as Makhan Singh's wife
- Rammohan Sharma as Masterji
- Anjan Srivastav as Bade Thakur's Munim
- Surendra Pal as Daku Suraj Bhan
- Rajan Haksar as Makhan Singh Choudhary
- Huma Khan as Singer
- Amitabh Bachchan as Narrator

== Soundtrack ==
Ghulami

Film score by Laxmikant–Pyarelal
- Genre: Feature film soundtrack

All lyrics are written by Gulzar; all music is composed by Laxmikant–Pyarelal.

No.	Title	Singer(s)	Length
1.	"Zeehale Muskin Makun ba-Ranjish" (Raga Bhairavi)	Lata Mangeshkar, Shabbir Kumar
2.	"Mere Peeko (Waqt Bee Jatha) Part I"	Lata Mangeshkar
3.	"Mere Peeko (Zehar Hai Raat) Part II"	Lata Mangeshkar
4.	"Peele Peele"	Manhar Udhas, Shabbir Kumar, Suresh Wadkar
5.	"Mere Peeko (Mujhse Roothi) Part III"	Lata Mangeshkar

== Awards ==
33rd Filmfare Awards:

Nominated

- Best Film – Nadiadwala & Sons
- Best Supporting Actor – Kulbhushan Kharbanda
