= Rucha Gujarathi =

Indian television actress (born 1982)

- Born: Rucha Gujrati; 1982 or 1983 (age 43–44); Mumbai, Maharashtra, India
- Education: Mary Immaculate Girls' High School & SNDT Women's University
- Occupation: Actress
- Years active: 1991–2018

Rucha Gujarathi (born 1982/1983) is an Indian Bollywood, television actress and model. She has acted in several Bollywood movies, soap operas, music albums and reality shows. She also acted as a child artist in several movies. She is best remembered for her lead role as "Suhana" (popularly known as Bhabhi) in Hindi language soap opera Bhabhi on Star Plus.

== Early life and education ==
Gujarathi was born in Mumbai in 1982 or 1983 and attended Mary Immaculate Girls' High School, Borivali to attain her Secondary education. She subsequently obtained a Diploma in Medical Lab Technology from SNDT Women's University.

== Career ==
Gujarathi worked as a child artist in movies Dancer, Shabzade, Hum Hain Kamal Ke, Kanyadan and Shikari. Subsequently she appeared in several soap operas, music albums and reality shows. As a model, Gujarathi has done several commercials like Frooti, Emami, Clinic All Clear, Colgate, Pizza Hut India etc. She has also featured in music albums by Gurdas Maan, Pankaj Udhas and Vaishali Samant.

== Filmography ==
Year	Name	Role	Comments
1991	Dancer	-	Child artist
1991	Shikari	Varsha Usgaonkar’s childhood	
1992	Sahebzaade	Neelam Kothari’s childhood	
1993	Hum Hain Kamaal Ke	Sheeba's sister	
1994	Kanyadan	Manisha Koirala’s childhood	
2009	Lottery	Soha	Debut as lead actress
2018	Aaya Hai Dulha Dulhan Le Jayega	Released in 2018, Shot in 2009	Female model

== Television ==
Year	Show	Role	Notes
2002	Kitne Kool Hai Hum		Supporting Role
2002	Kya Hadsaa Kya Haqeeqat - Hadsaa	Episode 1 - Episode 29	Episodic Role
2003 - 2005	Kkusum	Kali Kapoor / Kali Garv Sachdev / Kali Nakul Oberoi	Negative Role
2005	Rihaee	Shalini	Episodic Role
2005 - 2007; 2007 - 2008	Bhabhi	Suhana Seth / Suhana Vishal Chopra / Suhana Dev Thakral	Lead Role
2006	Pyaar Ke Do Naam: Ek Raadha, Ek Shyaam	Mahalaxmi	Supporting Role
2007	Ssshhhh...Phir Koi Hai - Khooni Billi	Anjali (Episode 17)	Episodic Role
2007	Sapna Babul Ka... Bidaai	Sonia (Episode 19)	Episodic Role
2007	Ssshhhh...Phir Koi Hai - Soutan : Part 1 & Part 2	Kavita (Episode 58 & Episode 59)	Episodic Role
2008	Ssshhhh...Phir Koi Hai - Maa Sherawali : Part 1 & Part 2	Episode 84 & Episode 85	Episodic Role
2008	Waqt Batayega Kaun Apna Kaun Paraya	Piya	Negative Role
2008	Waaris	Simran	Supporting Role
2009	Ssshhhh...Phir Koi Hai - Paalna : Part 1 & Part 2	Nandini (Episode 178 & Episode 179)	Episodic Role
2009	Ssshhhh...Phir Koi Hai - Drishti : Part 1 - Part 8	Aditi (Episode 202 - Episode 209)	Episodic Role
2010; 2011	Rang Badalti Odhni	Natasha (Tashu)	Negative Role
2011	Beend Banoongaa Ghodi Chadhunga	Meera	Negative Role
2011 - 2012	Saas Bina Sasural	Kiya Jai Malhotra / Kiya Ved Chaturvedi	Negative Role
2012	Hum Ne Li Hai - Shapath	Sameera	Episodic Role
2012	Ramayan	Ahalya (Episode 6)	Episodic Role
2012	C.I.D. - Baby Kidnapping Ka Mayajaal	Smita (Episode 890)	Episodic Role
2013	Adaalat	Kajal Bhandari (Episode 203 & Episode 204)	Episodic Role
2013	C.I.D. - Main Hoon Kaatil	Radhika (Episode 930)	Episodic Role
2013	Savdhaan India	Jayshree Shah (Episode 279)	Episodic Role
2013	Fear Files: Darr Ki Sacchi Tasvirein	Pisachini (Episode 97)	Episodic Role
2013 - 2014	Do Dil Bandhe Ek Dori Se	Mahima Jaswant Rana	Negative Role
2014	Yeh Hai Aashiqui - This Or That ?	Sonia (Episode 37)	Episodic Role
2014	C.I.D. - Khooni Taxi	Richa (Episode 1067)	Episodic Role
2015	Chidiya Ghar	Kishmish	Cameo Role
2015	Maharakshak Aryan	Yuvika (Episode 23 & Episode 24)	Episodic Role
2015	Raavi	Scientist Falaq	Cameo Role
2015	Yeh Hai Aashiqui	Reyanshi Khanna (Episode 91)	Episodic Role
2015	Code Red	Neha (Episode 43)	Episodic Role
2015	Code Red	Episode 126	Episodic Role
2016	Gangaa	Zoya Mirza / Zoya Chaturvedi	Supporting/Negative Role

=== Reality shows ===
From	To	Show	Channel	Producer	Comments
2005		Paisa Bhari Padega	Sony TV	FBC Media Pvt Ltd	
2008	2009	Saas v/s Bahu	Sahara One	Swastik Pictures	TV Dance series
2010		Dil Jeetegi Desi Girl	NDTV Imagine	BBC Worldwide	
2013		Welcome - Baazi Mehmaan-Nawaazi ki	Life OK	Miditech Pvt. Ltd.	
2015		Killerr Karaoke	&TV	SOL Productions	

== See also ==
- Cinema of India
- Bollywood
- Soap opera
