= List of Marathi films of 1992 =

A list of films produced by the Marathi language film industry based in Maharashtra in the year 1992.

== 1992 Releases ==
A list of Marathi films released in 1992.

Year	Film	Director	Cast	Notes	Source
1992	Apan Yana Pahilat Ka	Prakash Bhende	Vikram Gokhale, Prakash Bhende, Uma Bhende, Upendra Date		
1992	Patit Pawan	Aruna Raje			
1992	Shubh Mangal Savdhan	M. S. Salvi	Ashok Saraf, Varsha Usgaonkar, Laxmikant Berde, Asha Kale, Nilu Phule, Lata Arun, Leela Gandhi, Mohan Kotiwan, Vasant Shinde, Maya Jadhav		
1992	Jiwalagaa	Mahesh Kothare	Laxmikant Berde, Tushar Dalvi, Mohan Joshi		
1992	Sagale Sarkhech	Pradeep Dixit	Master Bhagwan		
1992	Yevu Kaa Gharaat	Dada Kondke	Dada Kondke		
1992	Maalmasala	Satish Ranadive	Jayshree Gadkar, Nilu Phule, Ashok Saraf		
1992	Zunz Tujhi Majhi	N. Relekar	Baby Ashu, Ashwini Bhave, Jyotsna Ghadalkar		
1992	Ek Hota Vidushak	Jabbar Patel	Laxmikant Berde, Varsha Usgaonkar, Madhu Kambikar, Nilu Phule	National Film Award for Best Feature Film in Marathi in 1992	
