= Shejari Shejari =

- Poster
- Directed by: Dilip Kolhatkar
- Written by: Ashok Patole
- Produced by: Sachin Parekar; Sanjay Parekar
- Starring: Ashok Saraf; Nishigandha Wad; Laxmikant Berde; Varsha Usgaonkar; Ravindra Berde; Nayana Apte Joshi; Shrikant Moghe
- Cinematography: Debu Deodhar
- Edited by: Ashok Patwardhan
- Music by: Vishwas Patankar
- Production company: Amol Production
- Release date: 31 December 1990
- Running time: 101 minutes
- Country: India
- Language: Marathi

Shejari Shejari (transl. Neighbours) is a 1990 Indian Marathi-language comedy film directed by Dilip Kolhatkar and produced by Sachin Parekar and Sanjay Parekar under the production banner of Amol Production with the story and screenplay provided by Ashok Patole. The film stars Ashok Saraf, Laxmikant Berde, Nishigandha Wad, Varsha Usgaonkar in the lead roles and Ravindra Berde, Nayana Apte Joshi and Shrikant Moghe in supporting roles. The film was loosely based on the 1964 American film Good Neighbor Sam, and was remade in Hindi in 2005 as Ssukh. The film was also loosely inspired by the Marathi play Pati Sagle Uchapati which was based on the English play Right Bed Wrong Husband. The Marathi play was later adapted into the 2009 Hindi film All The Best: Fun Begins.

== Plot ==
Shejari Shejari is a light, refreshing comedy picturing the invariable confusions and humorous situations that arise when people accidentally cross one another's path under assumed identities. Preeti (Varsha Usgaonkar) is wrongly under the impression that her photographer husband, Rajesh Deshpande (Laxmikant Berde), is having an extramarital affair with his clients, and this suspicion leads to both of them deciding to apply for a divorce. Preeti begins living separately opposite the bungalow of her childhood friend, Sushila (Nishigandha Wad), who is a housewife, and her husband, Keshav Kulkarni (Ashok Saraf), who works for an advertising company. Interestingly, Preeti comes across the revelation of her late grandfather having transferred her a substantial amount of ₹2.5 million from his will. However, there is a condition that she can avail of this inheritance only if she has a happy married life, otherwise the money would be passed on to her brother (Ravindra Berde) and sister-in-law (Nayana Apte Joshi).

Shortly, things take a turn when Preeti's brother and sister-in-law unexpectedly arrive to visit her, and Preeti is forced to introduce Keshav as her husband, Rajesh, so that she can accumulate the wealth of her grandfather. Despite the mix-up, Preeti's brother and sister-in-law remain suspicious and decide to hire a detective to uncover the truth about the apparent harmony in Preeti's married life. Simultaneously, Keshav's employer, Dongre (Shrikant Moghe), adds another layer of confusion by believing Preeti to be his wife and selecting both Keshav and Preeti as brand ambassadors for the product of one of his wealthy clients, Bhaiyyasaheb Dudhwale (Ravi Patwardhan). Dongre and Bhaiyyasaheb proceed to place hoardings of Keshav and Preeti together all over the city as part of the promotional campaign, creating a hilarious mix-up. In the midst of all this, Rajesh enters the scene, eager to mend his broken relationship with Preeti. However, he is forced to begin residing with Sushila, while Preeti resides with Keshav, both pretending to be happily married. The goal is to convince Preeti's brother and sister-in-law about the apparent harmony in her married life so that she can secure the significant wealth left behind by her grandfather. The story unfolds with humour, confusion and the complexity of relationships.

== Cast ==
- Ashok Saraf as Keshav Kulkarni
- Laxmikant Berde as Rajesh Deshpande
- Nishigandha Wad as Sushila Kulkarni
- Varsha Usgaonkar as Preeti Deshpande
- Ravindra Berde as Dada (Preeti's brother)
- Nayana Apte Joshi as Vahini (Preeti's sister-in-law)
- Shrikant Moghe as Mr. Dongre (Keshav's employer)
- Ravi Patwardhan as Bhaiyyasaheb Dudhwale (Mr. Dongre's client)
- Maya Gujjar as Aavdabai Dudhwale (Bhaiyyasaheb's wife)
- Sanjay Mone as Advocate Bokil (Rajesh and Preeti's divorce lawyer)
- Kishore Pradhan as Mr. Nadkarni (Keshav's colleague)
- Kishore Nandlaskar as Jipre (Mr. Dongre's employee)
- Jayant Savarkar as Judge

== Release ==
=== Theatrical ===
The film was theatrically released on 31 December 1990.

== Reception ==
The film received 4 rating out of 10 at Bollywood Hungama.
