= Nayana Apte Joshi =

Indian singer and actress

Nayana Apte
- Born: Nayana Apte; 22 February 1950 (age 76); Mumbai, Maharashtra, India
- Occupation: Singer-actress
- Years active: 1954–present
- Mother: Shanta Apte
- Awards: Padma Shri, Maharashtra Govt's Life Achievement Award

Nayana Apte Joshi is an Indian singer-actress who worked in Marathi, Hindi and Gujarati Movies and stage plays.

== Early years ==
She was taught classical music by her mother Shanta Apte, Indirabai Kelkar and Yashwant Bua Joshi. She got education of Natya Sangeet from Govindrao Patwardhan, Anna Pendharkar, Narayan Bodas and at times consulted and helped by Arvind Pilgaonkar. She gained a Bachelor of Arts degree in Literature (Sangeet Visharat in Classical Music)

== Career ==
Apte had worked as a child artist with her mother late Shanta Apte in "Chandipuja" in 1957. She has acted in 65 Marathi plays and also some Gujarati plays. This includes different types of roles including comedy, mythological, historical, social, traditional classic musical plays and to-date current subjects. She has done 25 Marathi Movies, 4 Hindi Movies and 6 Gujarati Movies. She has acted in 16 television serials including Marathi and Hindi. She is given interviews on radio, speeches and claims to have advised new singers.

== Filmography ==
- Ammaldar – अंमलदार
- Ekach Pyala – एकच प्याला
- Karayla gelo Ek – करायला गेलो एक
- Dev Nahi Devharyat – देव नाही देव्हार्‍यात
- Daive Labhala CHintamani – दैवे लाभला चिंतामणी
- Navra Maza Muthit – नवरा माझ्या मुठीत
- Sangeet Punyaprabhav – संगीत पुण्यप्रभाव
- Sangeet Manapman – मानापमान
- MUknayak – मूकनायक
- Ya, Ghar Aaplach Aahe – या घर आपलंच आहे
- Lagnachi Bedi – लग्नाची बेडी
- Vaarcha Majla Rikama – वरचा मजला रिकामा
- Sangeet Sharda – संगीत शारदा
- Shri Tasi Sau – श्री तशी सौ
- Saujanyachi Aishi Taishi – सौजन्याची ऐशी तैशी
- Sangeet Swayanavar – संगीत स्वयंवर
- Hunnymoon Express – हनीमून एक्सप्रेस
- Ha Swarg Saat Pavlancha – हा स्वर्ग सात पावलांचा
- Sunechya Rashila Sasu – सुनेच्या राशीला सासू
- Dinuchya Sasubai Radhabai – दिनूच्या सासूबाई राधाबाई
- Tilak Ani Agarkar – टिळक आणि आगरकर
- Vasu Chi Sasu – वासूची सासू

== Films ==
- Chupke Chupke – चुपकेचुपके (हिंदी, १९७५)
- Javaibapu Zindabad – जावईबापू झिंदाबाद
- Mili – मिली (हिंदी, १९७५)
- Nivdung – निवडुंग (मराठी)
- Ladigodi – लाडीगोडी (मराठी)
- Ek Full Char Half – एक फुल चार हाफ (मराठी, 1991)
- Yeda ki Khula - Vahini
- Shejari Shejari - Vahini
- Jawab (1995 film) – जवाब (हिंदी, १९९५)
- Gav Tasa Changla – गाव तसं चांगलं (मराठी)
- Chal Love Kar – चल लव्ह कर (मराठी, 2009)
- Mazya Navryachi Bayako – माझ्या नवऱ्याची बायको (मराठी, 2013)
- Madhyamvarg – मध्यमवर्ग (मराठी, 2014)
- 15 August (Netflix Movie) – १५ ऑगस्ट (मराठी नेटफ्लिक्स चित्रपट, 2019)
- Lek Asavi Tar Ashi (मराठी, 2024)
- Cup Bashi (2026)

== Television ==
- Shanti
- Waqt Ki Raftaar
- Don't Worry Ho Jayega
- Chukbhul Dyavi Ghyavi
- Sukhachya Sarini He Man Baware
- Bigg Boss Marathi 3 as Aaji's voice
- Gharo Ghari Matichya Chuli
- Wagle Ki Duniya - Nayi Peedhi Naye Kissey

== Awards ==
- Padma Shri award in 2014
- Late Annasaheb Kirloskar Sangeet Rangabhoomi Life Achievement Award (Maharashtra Government)
- Awards from Marathi Natya Parishad
- Awards from Kumar Kala Kendra
- Awards from Maharashtra Kala Kendra
- Mumbai Marathi Sahitya Sangha Award
