= Saathi (1991 film) =

1991 Indian Hindi crime drama film by Mahesh Bhatt

- Directed by: Mahesh Bhatt
- Written by: Robin Bhatt
- Produced by: Mukesh Duggal
- Starring: Aditya Pancholi; Mohsin Khan; Varsha Usgaonkar
- Cinematography: Pravin Bhatt
- Music by: Nadeem–Shravan
- Production company: Prince International
- Release date: 1991
- Country: India
- Language: Hindi

Saathi is a 1991 Indian Hindi-language crime drama film directed by Mahesh Bhatt. It stars Aditya Pancholi, Mohsin Khan and Varsha Usgaonkar in lead roles with Anupam Kher and Paresh Rawal in other pivotal roles. Aditya Pancholi's character was loosely inspired by Al Pacino's character Tony Montana from Scarface.

== Plot ==
At a young age Suraj (Aditya Pancholi) and Amar (Mohsin Khan) see their father brutally beaten by the police. Both grow up to become petty criminals. They meet a big gangster Pasha (Paresh Rawal). They then go their separate ways.

Amar hates the activities of Pasha's gang since they deal in drugs. Suraj, who wants to become rich, kills Pasha and becomes the leader of the gang. Amar is horrified that Suraj has been lost in the world of crime and humanity has been forgotten.

In the film's finale, Don Sultan (Anupam Kher) asks Suraj to kill Amar. He refuses to do so. Suraj is chased by the police and gets injured. His bodyguard gets murdered. Suraj reaches the place where Amar and Suraj used to go in their childhood. Amar, who heard his friend's voice, reaches the place. Inspector Kotwal reaches there and Amar tells him that Suraj wants to surrender. Inspector Kotwal reveals that he is the real Don Sultan and attempts to kill Suraj. Amar saves Suraj. Sultan tries to stab Amar. Suraj comes forward to protect Amar and is killed by Sultan. Amar then kills Sultan.

== Cast ==
- Aditya Pancholi as Suraj
- Mohsin Khan as Amar
- Varsha Usgaonkar as Nisha
- Paresh Rawal as Pasha
- Anupam Kher as Inspector Kotwal / Sultan
- Mushtaq Khan as Shetty
- Avtar Gill as Samant
- Anant Jog as Ragpicker Father of Suraj
- Javed Khan Amrohi as Beer Bar Tender
- Soni Razdan as Tina

== Music ==
Music is composed by Nadeem–Shravan. The most popular song of the album "Hui Aankh Nam" was sung by Anuradha Paudwal. "Zindagi Ki Talash Mein" is a hit song even today. Other successful songs on the soundtrack are "Yaarana Yaar Ka" and "Aaj Hum Tum O Sanam".

Saathi

Soundtrack album by Nadeem–Shravan
- Released: 1991
- Genre: Feature film soundtrack
- Length: 41:25
- Language: Hindi
- Label: T-Series
- Producer: Nadeem–Shravan

Nadeem–Shravan chronology
Saajan (1991)	Saathi (1991)	Phool Aur Kaante (1991)

All music is composed by Nadeem–Shravan.

No.	Title	Lyrics	Singer (s)	Length
1.	"Zindagi Ki Talaash Mein"	Sameer	Kumar Sanu	5:51
2.	"Hui Aankh Nam"	Nawab Arzoo	Anuradha Paudwal	5:04
3.	"Aaj Hum Tum O Sanam"	Sameer	Jolly Mukherjee, Anuradha Paudwal	4:20
4.	"Yaarana Yaar Ka"	Hasrat Jaipuri	Kumar Sanu, Vipin Sachdeva	4:01
5.	"Aisa Bhi Dekho Waqt"	Surender Sathi	Kumar Sanu, Anwar Hussain	4:54
6.	"Har Ghadi Bekhudi"	Sameer	Udit Narayan, Anuradha Paudwal	5:40
7.	"Mohabbat Ko Duniya"	Sameer	Kumar Sanu, Debashish Dasgupta	5:36
8.	"Tera Naam Sabke Lap Pe"	Sameer	Anuradha Paudwal	6:08

== Reception ==
This film was the most successful film of Aditya Pancholi's career.

According to the author Dina Khdair, this was also the most successful film of Mohsin Khan.
