= Hatya (2004 film) =

- Poster
- Directed by: Kader Kashmiri
- Written by: M. Salim
- Produced by: SA Luthria
- Starring: Akshay Kumar; Navin Nischol; Varsha Usgaonkar
- Music by: Nadeem-Shravan
- Release date: 15 October 2004
- Running time: 131 minutes
- Country: India
- Language: Hindi

Hatya (transl. Murder) is a 2004 Hindi-language fantasy film directed by Kader Kashmiri. The film stars Akshay Kumar, Navin Nischol, Reema Lagoo and Varsha Usgaonkar in lead roles with Rajendra Gupta, Raza Murad and Rajesh Vivek in supporting roles.

== Plot ==
Ravi Lal (Akshay Kumar) lives a wealthy lifestyle with his father Ratanlal (Navin Nischol), his mother Seema (Reema Lagoo) and with his sister. Meanwhile, Ravi has fallen in love with Kavita (Varsha Usgaonkar), and they get married. Ratan Lal is killed by businessman Murugan (Rajendra Gupta) after turning down the offer of various land and royalties. Ravi witnesses his father's brutal end and is injured badly by Murugan's men and is hospitalized. Soon Kavita notices that Ravi has changed... He is more quiet and brooding. Kavita eventually suspects that Ravi is having an affair. But what she doesn't know is that.. he was already killed, and his body transformed into a shape-changing venomous snake. Now out for revenge, he sets out to kill Murugan.

== Cast ==
- Akshay Kumar as Ravi Lal
- Navin Nischol as Ratan Lal
- Reema Lagoo as Mrs. R. Lal
- Laxmikant Berde as Bhandari
- Varsha Usgaonkar as Kavita Jaiswal
- Rajendra Gupta as Murugan
- Rajesh Vivek as Snake Charmer
- Johnny Lever as Paid Mourner
- Raza Murad as Bhandari
- Dinyar Contractor
- Sudhir as Johny
- Pankaj Berry as Babu Rokde
- C S Dubey

== Soundtrack ==
Music was composed by the popular music director duo Nadeem-Sharvan.

#	Title	Singer(s)
1	"Yun Hafte Hafte Milna"	Kumar Sanu, Alka Yagnik
2	"Kitna Intezar Tera Aur"	Kumar Sanu, Alka Yagnik
3	"Khabar Chhap Jayegi"	Kumar Sanu, Alka Yagnik
4	"Ankhon Hi Ankhon Mein"	Ahmed Mirza, Sarika Kapoor
5	"Koyaliya Bole Kuhu Kuhu"	Ahmed Mirza, Kavita Krishnamurthy
6	"Raat Ke Baj Gaye"	Roop Kumar Rathod, Sapna Mukherjee

== Critical response ==
Subhash K. Jha had criticised the film story and direction, terming as "murder" for every aesthetic value in cinema.
