= Varsha Usgaonkar =

Indian actress and model (born 1968)

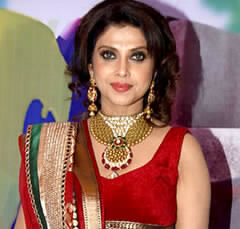
- Usgaonkar in 2015
- Born: 28 February 1968 (age 58); Usgao, Goa, India
- Occupations: Actress; singer
- Years active: 1982–present
- Spouse: Ajay Shankar Sharma (m. 2000)
- Father: A. K. S. Usgaonkar
- Relatives: Ravi Shankar Sharma (father-in-law)

Varsha Usgaonkar (born 28 February 1968) is an Indian actress, singer, and stage performer, best known for her work in Marathi cinema and television, with notable appearances in Hindi and Konkani films. Widely regarded as one of the most accomplished actresses in the Marathi industry during the late 1980s and 1990s, she earned acclaim for her versatility, glamorous image, and crossover appeal. Often referred to as the “Wonder Girl” of Marathi cinema, she emerged as one of the most popular and influential actresses of her generation, becoming a youth icon of the era. Over the course of her career, she has received numerous accolades, including three Maharashtra State Film Awards, four additional nominations, and nominations at both the Filmfare Marathi Awards and Screen Awards Marathi.

The daughter of politician A. K. S. Usgaonkar, she began her artistic journey in theatre, performing in acclaimed productions such as Mahapur, Karti Premat Padli, and Brahmachari. Her breakthrough as a leading lady came with the Marathi comedy Gammat Jammat (1987), which established her as a rising star. She went on to become a leading actress in Marathi cinema with films like Khatyal Sasu Nataal Soon (1987), Hamaal De Dhamaal (1989), Saglikade Bombabomb (1989), Shejari Shejari (1990), Shubh Mangal Savdhan (1992), and Dhangad Dhinga (1999). She also made a significant mark in Hindi films, appearing in successful projects such as Saathi (1991), Hafta Bandh (1991), and Tirangaa (1993).

Usgaonkar’s critically acclaimed roles in films like Ek Hota Vidushak (1993), Savat Mazi Ladki (1993), Lapandav (1993), Yadnya (1994), and Paij Lagnachi (1998) cemented her status as a strong and versatile actress. She also gained popularity on television for her portrayals of mythological and historical figures, appearing in acclaimed series such as Mahabharat (1988–89), Jhansi Ki Rani (1995–96), Vishnu Puran (2001), and later took on prominent roles in Man Udhan Varyache (2009–2011), and Sukh Mhanje Nakki Kay Asta! (2020–2024). Across her decades-spanning career, Usgaonkar has explored a variety of mediums, from Marathi commercial cinema and Hindi action dramas to Konkani and Rajasthani films, devotional serials, and stage musicals. She starred in the Konkani films Zanvoy No.1 (2018) and Benddkar (2019), and made her tiatr debut in 2025 with Devachem Nanv, Jietam Hanv.

In addition to acting, she has recorded Konkani songs, performed in over a thousand live stage shows, and participated in Bigg Boss Marathi 5. She also served on the board of directors of the Indian Marathi Film Corporation. Her personal life and public image have often drawn media attention. In 2000, she married Ajay Sharma, son of noted music director Ravi.

== Early life ==
Varsha Usgaonkar was born on 28 February 1968 into a Gaud Saraswat Brahmin family in Usgao, Goa, to A. K. S. Usgaonkar, a prominent politician, and Manikabai Usgaonkar, a classical singer. Her father was a senior leader of the Maharashtrawadi Gomantak Party and served as a Cabinet Minister in the Government of Goa, Daman and Diu. Influenced by her mother, Varsha developed an early interest in classical music, training under Pandit Sudhakar Karandikar, and also trained in Kathak during her childhood. A native Konkani speaker, she is the eldest of three sisters; her younger siblings are Tosha Kurade and Manisha Tarcar.

She completed her Bachelor of Commerce degree from Dempo College of Commerce and Economics in Panaji. During this time, she began pursuing a local acting career with the Kala Shuklendu, a theatre group with which she performed in several notable plays, including Mahapur, Ek Hoti Vaghinn, Andhar Mazha Sobti, and Baki Itihaas. Her performance in Mahapur earned her the Mumbai Inter-State Drama Gold Medal, and she received further acclaim for her role in Ashroonchi Zhali Phule earned her several accolades. Recognizing her potential, the Kala Academy awarded her a scholarship that enabled her to pursue an acting course at Dr. Babasaheb Ambedkar Marathwada University in Aurangabad, where Prashant Dalvi and Chandrakant Kulkarni were among her contemporaries. Though she had aspired to join the Film and Television Institute of India (FTII) in Pune, but since admissions were closed at the time, she chose to take the course in Aurangabad instead.

== Career ==
=== Theatre and Breakthrough in Marathi Films (1980s–1989) ===
After moving to Bombay in the early 1980s to pursue acting, Usgaonkar was mentored by renowned Marathi theatre veteran Damu Kenkre. She made her mark in the experimental play Karti Premat Padli, an adaptation of P. G. Wodehouse's novel The Small Bachelor, directed by Vijay Kenkre. The play marked Vijay Kenkre's first major success as a director and introduced Usgaonkar to a wider theatre audience. She went on to perform in the commercial play Brahmachari, produced by Suyog Natya Sanstha and directed by Damu Kenkare, opposite Prashant Damle. Her portrayal of a confident and modern heroine, wearing a T-shirt and shorts, attracted widespread attention. The bold presentation was considered unconventional within the Marathi theatre scene at the time and brought her significant recognition. One of the audience members at a performance of the play was actor-director Sachin Pilgaonkar, who later offered her a role in the Marathi film Gammat Jammat (1987).

Although she signed Gammat Jammat first, her screen debut came with Damu Kenkre's Tuzya Wachun Karamena, in which she appeared in a supporting role alongside Ashok Saraf and Alka Kubal. The song "Doli Ga Doli" was picturized on her character. Later in 1987, Gammat Jammat was released, marking her first film as a lead actress. She portrayed the spirited daughter of a wealthy businessman who, after being kidnapped, turns the situation to her advantage to rebel against her restrictive upbringing. Introduced to audiences as a “wonder girl,” Usgaonkar brought a fresh and modern image to the Marathi film heroine. The film was both a commercial and critical success, and her performance earned her the Maharashtra State Film Award for Best Actress. Her next release was N. S. Vaidya’s drama Khatyal Sasu Nataal Soon, in which she starred opposite Nitish Bharadwaj. Usgaonkar played the title role of the soon (daughter-in-law), a strong-willed and intelligent woman who challenges her mother-in-law’s authority to assert her own place within the family. The following year, she appeared in Majjach Majja, where she took on a dual role, portraying both male and female characters. She was also seen in Reshmigathi, playing the role of a beloved daughter considered a lucky charm by her family, who defies her parents’ wishes to be with her love interest, portrayed by Ashok Shinde. Around the same time, Usgaonkar made her television debut with a brief role in Mahabharat, the iconic Doordarshan series based on the ancient Sanskrit epic. She portrayed Uttarā, the princess of Matsya and wife of Abhimanyu, whose survival after the Kurukshetra war ensured the continuation of the Pandava lineage. Interestingly, Usgaonkar first visited the set as a spectator during casting, and was offered the role by Gufi Paintal on the spot—without a screentest. The series was highly acclaimed and, over the years, achieved cult status in Indian television history.

In 1989, Usgaonkar appeared in the crime drama Bhutacha Bhau as part of a story about a ghost aiding his brother in avenging their father’s murder, followed by the comedy Saglikade Bombabomb, where she played an actress who turns a rumor about herself into reality, and the romantic drama Pasant Aahe Mulgi, portraying a modern, extroverted college girl who wins over a disinterested suitor—all of which were well received. That same year, she reunited with director N. S. Vaidya for the comedy-drama Navra Baiko, which told the story of a constantly quarreling couple whose souls are swapped by Lord Krishna in an unexpected divine twist. However, the film went largely unnoticed. Her most notable success that year came with the romantic comedy Hamaal De Dhamaal, directed by Purushottam Berde, where she played an actress opposite Laxmikant Berde. Her performance was praised and earned her a nomination for the Maharashtra State Film Award for Best Actress.

=== Marathi Stardom and Hindi Film Career (1990–1995) ===
The following year, she appeared in ten films. Among them were Aamchya Sarkhe Aamhich, her fourth and final collaboration with Sachin as director, a comedy about two sets of lookalike brothers who decide to swap lives; and Shejari Shejari, loosely based on the 1964 American film Good Neighbor Sam, in which she played a suspicious yet determined woman who, after separating from her husband, pretends to be happily married to her friend’s husband in a comical scheme to secure her rightful inheritance. Both films were major commercial successes, with Shejari Shejari later remade in Hindi in 2005 as Ssukh. Her other Marathi releases that year included Patli Re Patli, inspired by the 1968 Hindi film Padosan, where she reprised the role originally played by Saira Banu; the family drama Baap Re Baap; and Kuthe Kuthe Shodhu Mi Tila, which was based on a similar concept as the 1981 Hindi film Ladies Tailor. The lattermost was one of the rare commercial failures during Laxmikant Berde’s peak career. That year also marked Usgaonkar's debut in both Hindi and Bengali cinema. In the Hindi film Doodh Ka Karz, she played a supporting role alongside Jackie Shroff and Neelam Kothari, while in the Bengali film Sei To Abar Kache Ele, she starred opposite Prosenjit Chatterjee and Arjun Chakraborty.

The year 1991 proved to be one of the most successful periods of Usgaonkar’s career, including notable recognition in Hindi film industry. She starred in the crime drama Saathi, directed by Mahesh Bhatt, opposite Aditya Pancholi and Mohsin Khan. She also appeared in the action film Hafta Bandh, opposite Jackie Shroff, where she played Marie, a village girl who falls in love with a police inspector. Both films were a surprise hit at the box office and helped establish her presence in the Hindi cinema. In Marathi, she featured in the crime-romance Aflatoon, and Mumbai Te Mauritius, a drama in which she portrayed a double role—one as a modern woman living in Mauritius and the other as a dancer in a troupe based in Mumbai. That same year, she also played the female lead in the Indo-Russian production Shikari, opposite Mithun Chakraborty. While the film attempted to appeal to international audiences, many critics noted that Usgaonkar’s role was sidelined in favor of the Russian actress. Despite expectations, the film was a commercial failure in Russia, where Indian cinema otherwise enjoyed strong popularity.

In 1992, she had five Hindi film releases, including the action film Sone Ki Lanka opposite Chunky Pandey, the romantic comedy Ghar Jamai opposite Mithun, and the romantic drama Dilwale Kabhi Na Hare opposite Prithvi. She also appeared alongside Rishi Kapoor in Honeymoon, a Hindi remake of the hit Marathi film Kiss Bai Kiss (1988), which met with moderate success. However, it was the Marathi family drama Shubh Mangal Savdhan that stood out that year, emerging as one of the highest-grossing Marathi films of 1992. The year 1993 began on a high note with the Hindi blockbuster Tirangaa, an action drama co-starring Raaj Kumar and Nana Patekar, in which Usgaonkar played the love interest of Patekar’s character. The film, centered around preventing a nuclear terrorist attack on India, became one of the top-grossing Hindi films of the year. She also acted alongside Rajinikanth in Insaniyat Ke Devta and with Naseeruddin Shah in Hasti.

While her success in Hindi cinema remained inconsistent, she continued to deliver acclaimed performances in Marathi films. That year, she played a glamorous film star in Ek Hota Vidushak, directed by Jabbar Patel and written by veteran playwright P. L. Deshpande. Her character encourages Aburao (played by Laxmikant Berde), a talented folk performer, to enter the film industry and later marries him for her own motives. The film, one of the rare Marathi productions exploring the lives of folk artists, was screened at the International Film Festival of India and went on to win the National Film Award for Best Feature Film in Marathi (1992), along with five Maharashtra State Film Awards, including a Best Actress nomination for Usgaonkar. Despite the critical acclaim, the film was a commercial failure. She next starred in Lapandav, the directorial debut of Shrabani Deodhar, where she played the daughter of Ashok Saraf, a notable casting choice, as the two had previously been paired as romantic leads. The film, a satirical family drama, won the National Film Award for Best Feature Film in Marathi (1993). Usgaonkar also took on a supporting role in Savat Mazi Ladki, by Smita Talwalkar, where she played the girlfriend of a married man (Mohan Joshi), whose wife (Neena Kulkarni) responds with unexpected kindness and affection. The film was a major box-office success and earned Usgaonkar nomination for the Maharashtra State Film Award for Best Supporting Actress.

Additionally, she made an appearance in Saawan Kumar Tak’s Khal-Naaikaa, in which she was notably seen smoking a cigarette on screen, an uncommon portrayal for mainstream actresses at the time. The following year was relatively less successful for Usgaonkar in terms of film roles, but she gained visibility on television with her brief but memorable appearance as Roopmati Nagrani in the fantasy series Chandrakanta, based on Devaki Nandan Khatri’s 1888 novel of the same name.

=== Television Career and Film Setbacks (1996–2008) ===
From 1995 to 1996, she played the title role in Ravi Chopra’s 13-episode television series Jhansi Ki Rani, which depicted Rani Lakshmibai’s leadership following the outbreak of conflict and her battles against the British. Presented in a documentary-style format, the series was made in both Hindi and English and was produced by Hema Malini. In 1995, she saw a return to form with Painjan, directed by Sadashiv Amrapurkar, where she portrayed the mistress of a missing tamasha performer, Pilajirao, whose relationships within the troupe become central to the investigation. She also played a police inspector in Zakhmi Kunku and took on a complex lead role in Aboli, portraying Mona, a mentally unstable actress who becomes dangerously possessive of a budding painter named Saya, gradually revealing her obsessive and disturbed nature.

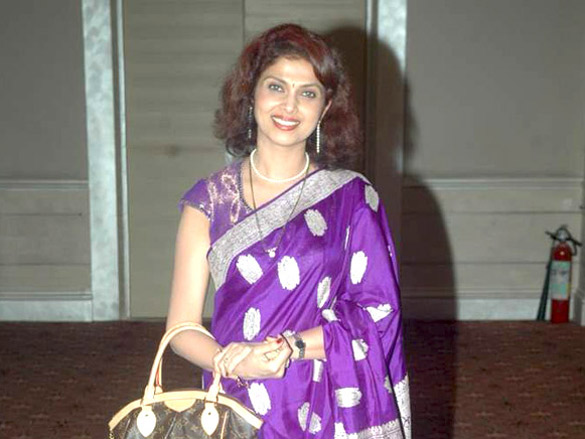
Usgaonkar at an event in late 2000s.

In 1996, she reunited with Aditya Pancholi for K. C. Bokadia’s Muqadama, though the film failed to make an impact at the box office. During the later part of the decade, she appeared in several films, though most did not garner significant attention. Notable among them were the comedy Bayko Chukli Standvar (1998), a role she reprised over a decade later in its 2010 remake Bayko Zali Gayab; Mahesh Kothare’s Dhangad Dhinga (1999); and Ladhaai (1999), in which she played a strong-willed female protagonist. She won her third State Award and earned a Filmfare Marathi nomination for Best Actress for the 1998 drama Paij Lagnachi, in which she portrayed a bold and confident young woman from a wealthy background who thrives on challenges. She was also seen in the biographical drama Dhyaas Parva, based on the life of Raghunath Dhondo Karve, a pioneer in promoting family planning and birth control in India, in which she portrayed Shakuntala Paranjpye, an acclaimed writer, actress, and noted social reformer.

With the start of the new century, Usgaonkar remained active in both films and television. In 2000, she portrayed Goddess Mohini, the female avatar of Vishnu, in Vishnu Puran, marking her third collaboration with Ravi Chopra, and also played the lead in Alvida Darling, directed by Anant Mahadevan, a light-hearted series about a divorcing couple growing unexpectedly close. She later appeared in an episode of Zee TV’s anthology series Kabhie Kabhie (2003) and began portraying maternal roles, such as in Zee Marathi’s Tuzyavina, alongside Urmilla Kothare and Yatin Karyekar. In Jaane Pehchaane Se... Ye Ajnabbi, she played Kamini, a manipulative antagonist who murders her son and daughter-in-law and attempts to kill their relative to seize the family wealth. In films, Usgaonkar was paired with younger actors such as Bharat Jadhav and Ankush Chaudhari; with Chaudhari, she played a rich college girl turned entrepreneur in Sakshatkar. She starred opposite Laxmikant Berde for the last time in Tuzyacha Sathi, portraying a woman who conspires with her lover to murder her husband. That same year, her final Hindi film in a leading role, Hatya: The Murder opposite Akshay Kumar, was released after being delayed since 1992. In 2005, she appeared in comedy Sawaal Majha Premacha, a tale of a mother and daughter, both accomplished dancers, who captivate a father and son, alongside Ajinkya Deo, Ashok Saraf, and Madhu Kambikar. She also took on character roles in Hindi films, notably as Rani Laxmibai in Mangal Pandey: The Rising, and as a principled mother who supports her daughter’s ambitions, unaware of the sacrifices her daughter makes in Jigyaasa.

=== Later Career and Resurgence (2009–Present) ===
In 2009, she featured in Kothare Vision’s television drama Man Udhan Varyache, where she played a high-society woman who insists her son marry a modern, educated daughter-in-law. The show garnered top ratings, and her role was especially well received by the audience. Around this time, she also appeared in the critically acclaimed action drama Arjun and the family drama Thoda Tuza Thoda Maza. In 2013, she played the mother of an innocent, introverted boy (played by Swapnil Joshi) in Sanjay Jadhav’s coming-of-age romantic drama Duniyadari. The film was a massive success, becoming the highest-grossing Marathi film of the year and earning cult status.

Her Rajasthani film debut came in 2016 with Kangana, for which she earned a Best Supporting Performance nomination at the Rajasthan Film Festival. That same year, she appeared in Ardhangini Ek Ardhsatya, based on Rabindranath Tagore’s 1916 novel The Home and the World, portraying a widow who resents her sister-in-law's growing affection for a houseguest and contributes to household tension. However, the film was panned by critics. Usgaonkar made her Konkani film debut with Zanvoy No.1 in 2018, which received an overwhelming response upon release and set a record in Mangalorean cinema as the first Konkani film to be screened simultaneously at 13 theatres across the region. A year later, she reunited with the Zanvoy No.1 team for the Konkani film Benddkar, which also received a positive response from audiences and critics alike. After a decade, she reunited with Kothare Vision for the successful series Sukh Mhanje Nakki Kay Asta!, portraying a loving and resilient matriarch who selflessly endures immense loss and remains the emotional anchor of the family across generations. She exited the series in 2024 and went on to participate in the reality television show Bigg Boss Marathi 5, where she finished in 7th place.

In 2022, she took on a darker role as Bagi Begum, a princess of the Adil Shahi Dynasty of Bijapur, in Digpal Lanjekar’s historical action film Sher Shivraj. After 36 years, she and longtime collaborator Prashant Damle teamed up once again for the stage play Sarkha Kahitari Hotay, a comedy that explores the humorous yet relatable challenges families face due to generational differences and received critical acclaim.

Continuing her artistic exploration, Usgaonkar made her tiatr debut in 2025 with Devachem Nanv, Jietam Hanv, a production that touches on themes of family, marriage, land, and mental health. She portrayed a modern mother and mother-in-law who values family unity and also showcased her talents in singing and dancing, with her performance receiving much appreciation from the audience.

== Personal life ==
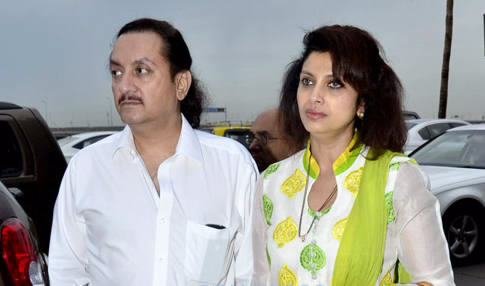
Usgaonkar with husband Ajay Sharma in 2014

Usgaonkar is publicly reticent about her personal life. During the late 1980s, while filming the television series Mahabharat, she met actor Nitish Bharadwaj, who played the role of Lord Krishna. The two began a romantic relationship during the production of the show, however, the relationship ended in 1991 reportedly due to opposition from Bharadwaj’s family.

Initially, Usgaonkar was not ready for marriage. However, when she eventually began considering it after encouragement from actress Tanuja, her parents expressed a desire for her to marry into a family with an artistic background. In March 2000, she entered into an arranged marriage with Ajay Sharma, the son of Padma Shri awardee and renowned music director Ravi Shankar Sharma. Usgaonkar later admitted that she was hesitant about the match at the time, as she had envisioned a love marriage and felt that Ajay did not align with her earlier expectations. Interestingly, Ajay and Usgaonkar had first met nearly a decade earlier, when she was performing in a Lavani production for the British television channel Channel 4, which was produced by Ajay.

Tensions within the family surfaced publicly in 2010, when her father-in-law, Ravi, filed a complaint against Usgaonkar and Ajay, alleging mental harassment and claiming he had been barred from entering the first floor of his own residence. A few years later, in 2013, she became involved in a legal dispute with her sisters-in-law, Chhaya Ojha and Veena Upadhyaya, regarding the ownership of their late father’s bungalow in Santacruz, Mumbai. After Ravi’s passing, the sisters accused Usgaonkar and her husband of harassment and unauthorized occupation of the property. The matter escalated to police complaints and eventually reached the Bandra Metropolitan Magistrate’s Court in 2018. The court facilitated a settlement, dividing the property among the family members and ordering the installation of CCTV cameras to prevent further conflicts.

Her father, A. K. S. Usgaonkar, died on 16 June 2020 after a prolonged illness at Goa Medical College in Bambolim. Due to the COVID-19 lockdown in India at the time, she was unable to attend his funeral.

== In the media and other works ==
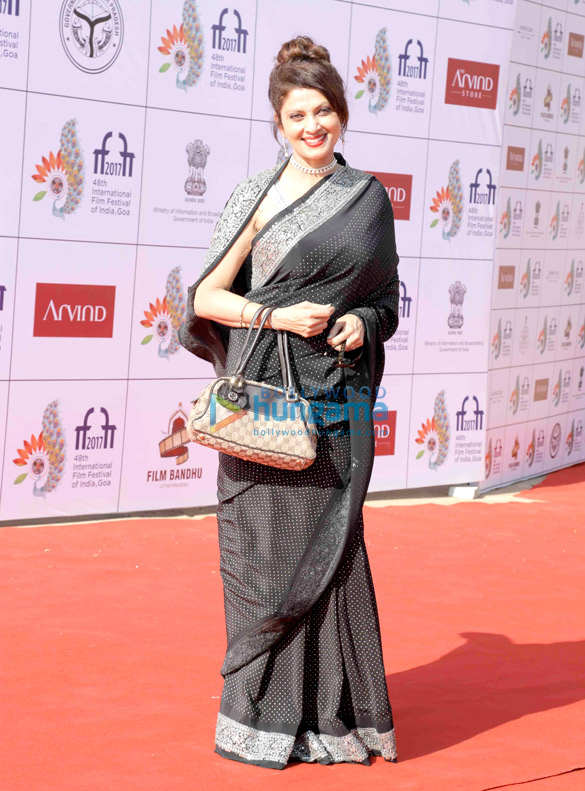
Usgaonkar graces closing ceremony of IFFI 2017 in Goa.

Usgaonkar is considered one of the most prominent faces in Marathi cinema. Widely regarded as a youth icon of her time, she enjoyed immense popularity for her screen presence, dance skills, and distinctive style. Her vibrant performances and crossover appeal in both Marathi and Hindi entertainment industries contributed to her widespread recognition during the late 1980s and 1990s. At the height of her career, she was frequently featured in film magazines, entertainment tabloids, and popular media. Regarded as a style icon, Usgaonkar was known for effortlessly blending traditional Indian attire with bold fashion choices, including wearing a swimsuit on screen—an uncommon move for Marathi actresses of that era. In the mid-1990s, she drew public attention for participating in a topless photoshoot for an English-language magazine. The shoot generated significant controversy and was widely criticized by audiences at the time, sparking debates around onscreen representation and celebrity image.

In the mid-1990s, she performed over a thousand stage shows titled Varsha Usgaonkar Nights, and in 2008, released a Konkani music album Roop Tujem Laita Pixem, featuring five songs sung by her in collaboration with noted singer Ulhas Buyao. In March 2015, she walked the ramp alongside hotelier Timmy Narang at the 10th Annual Caring with Style fashion event held in Mumbai, an initiative supporting cancer patients through the NGO Cancer Patients Aid Association (CPAA). In 2016, Usgaonkar contested and won the first-ever Indian Marathi Film Corporation election from the actors’ group, securing a position on the board of directors.

== Filmography ==
=== Films ===
Year	Title	Role	Language	Notes
1986	Tuzya Wachun Karamena	Dolly	Marathi	
1987	Gammat Jammat	Kalpana Korde / Gautami	Marathi	Maharashtra State Film Award for Best Actress
1987	Khatyal Sasu Nataal Soon	Maya Jagde	Marathi	
1988	Majjach Majja	Kamini Pratap Singh	Marathi	
1988	Reshimgathi	Shimpli	Marathi	
1989	Bhutacha Bhau	Anjali	Marathi	
1989	Saglikade Bombabomb	Rajni Bala	Marathi	
1989	Hamaal De Dhamaal	Nandini Patwardhan	Marathi	
1989	Atmavishwas	Nisha	Marathi	
1989	Navra Baiko	Varsha	Marathi	
1989	Pasant Aahe Mulgi	Madhumati Dhurandhar	Marathi	
1990	Doodh Ka Karz	Kajri Lohar	Hindi	
1990	Aamchya Sarkhe Aamhich	Nandini Deshpande	Marathi	
1990	Shejari Shejari	Preeti	Marathi	
1990	Sei To Abar Kache Ele	Sita	Bengali	
1990	Changu Mangu	Herself	Marathi	Special appearance
1990	Ghanchakkar	Herself	Marathi	Special appearance
1990	Patli Re Patli	Nanda	Marathi	
1990	Kuthe Kuthe Shodhu Me Tila	Sujata	Marathi	
1990	Baap Re Baap	Naina	Marathi	
1990	Dokyala Taap Nahin	Vandana	Marathi	
1991	Shikari: The Hunter	Chanchal	Hindi	
1991	Shikari: The Hunter	Chanchal	Russian	
1991	Saathi	Nisha	Hindi	
1991	Hafta Bandh	Maria	Hindi	
1991	Aflatoon	Bitti	Marathi	
1991	Mumbai Te Mauritius	Aarti / Bharti	Marathi	
1991	Yeda Ki Khula	Aarti Divekar	Marathi	
1991	Jeeva Sakha	Paru	Marathi	
1992	Sone Ki Zanjeer	Sonali	Hindi	
1992	Shubh Mangal Savdhan	Jaya	Marathi	
1992	Honeymoon	Asha S. Verma	Hindi	
1992	Sone Ki Lanka	Romu / Ram Pyari	Hindi	
1992	Dilwale Kabhi Na Hare	Shabnam	Hindi	
1992	Ghar Jamai	Mona	Hindi	
1992	Maal Masala	Varsha Deshmukh	Marathi	
1992	Soona Ani Mona	Mona	Marathi	
1993	Tirangaa	Shanti	Hindi	
1993	Insaniyat Ke Devta	Husna Bano	Hindi	
1993	Ek Hota Vidushak	Menaka	Marathi	
1993	Savat Mazi Ladki	Dr. Beena Karnik	Marathi	
1993	Lapandav	Rasika Samarth	Marathi	
1993	Aikava Te Navalach	Dr. Vandana	Marathi	
1993	Paisa Paisa Paisa	Tanuja (Tannu) Kelkar	Marathi	
1993	Hasti	Anita (Anu)	Hindi	
1993	Khal-Naaikaa	Varsha Sharma	Hindi	
1993	Pardesi	Shanker's love interest	Hindi	
1993	Ghar Aaya Mera Pardesi	Radha	Hindi	
1993	Parwane	Suzie	Hindi	
1994	Pathreela Raasta	Mona	Hindi	
1994	Mr. Shrimati	Sanju's Partner	Hindi	Special appearance; TV Movie
1994	Beta Ho To Aisa	Mini	Hindi	
1994	Yadnya	Nisha	Marathi	
1994	Chal Gammat Karu		Marathi	
1994	Soodchakra		Marathi	
1995	Painjan	Jaswanti	Marathi	
1995	Jamla Ho Jamla	Radha	Marathi	
1995	Dushmani: A Violent Love Story	Dancer	Hindi	Special appearance in a song "Mera Salaam Le"
1995	Aboli	Mona	Marathi	
1995	Zakhmi Kunku	Inspector Rajlaxmi	Marathi	
1996	Shohrat	Rajani	Hindi	
1996	Muqadama	Seema	Hindi	
1997	Jai Mahalaxmi Maa	Laxmi	Hindi	
1997	Paij Lagnachi	Pooja	Marathi	Maharashtra State Film Award for Best Actress
1998	Haste Hasate	Varsha	Hindi	
1998	Yeh Na Thi Hamari Qismat		Hindi	
1998	Bayko Chukli Standvar	Hausa / Sribaby	Marathi	
1999	Rang Premacha	Champa	Marathi	
1999	Navra Mumbaicha	Gauri	Marathi	
1999	Tuch Majhi Suhasini	Suhasini	Marathi	
1999	Dhangad Dhinga	Madhura Mone	Marathi	
1999	Karaycha Te Dankyat		Marathi	
1999	Ladhaai	Sunita Nadkarni	Marathi	
1999	Sakhi Mazi		Marathi	
1999	Chehraa	Menka	Hindi	
2000	Sant Gyaneshwar		Hindi	
2000	Dhani Kunkuwacha		Marathi	
2000	Kal Ka Aadmi	Shakuntala Paranjpe	Hindi	
2001	Dhyaas Parva	Shakuntala Paranjpe	Marathi	Dubbed version of Kal Ka Aadmi
2001	Style	Police Inspector	Hindi	
2002	Memsaab No.1		Hindi	Special appearance
2002	Shanti Ne Keli Kranti		Marathi	
2003	Baap Ka Baap	Uma Dixit	Hindi	
2004	Hatya: The Murder	Kavita Jaiswal	Hindi	
2004	Sakshatkar	Saudamini	Marathi	
2004	Tuzyacha Sathi	Radhika	Marathi	
2005	Mangal Pandey	Rani Laxmibai	Hindi	
2005	Sawal Majha Premacha	Jayshree Karadkar	Marathi	
2005	Mr Ya Miss	Parvati	Hindi	Special appearance
2006	Jigyaasa	Malini Mathur	Hindi	
2009	Mare Paryant Phashi	Jailor's wife	Marathi	
2010	Bayko Zali Gayab	Hausa	Marathi	
2010	Ladi Godi	Rekha	Marathi	
2011	Arjun	Maya Thackeray	Marathi	
2013	Thoda Tuza Thoda Maza	Malti	Marathi	
2013	Duniyadari	Rani Maa	Marathi	
2013	Naam		Hindi	Unreleased
2014	Super Nani	Chandani	Hindi	
2014	Hututu	Madhu	Marathi	Maharashtra State Film Award for Best Comedian
2014	Capuccino	Sunanda	Marathi	
2015	Marg Maza Aekala		Marathi	Unreleased
2016	Kangana	Kangana	Rajasthani	
2016	Lord of Shingnapur		Marathi	
2016	Ardhangini Ek Ardhsatya	Bara Rani	Hindi	
2017	Bhavishyachi Aishi Taishi	Megha's mother	Marathi	
2017	Oli Ki Suki	Advocate	Marathi	
2018	Zanvoy No.1	Diana's mother-in-law	Konkani	
2018	Valan		Marathi	
2018	Madhav - Every Child Needs Mentor	Sharda Mehta	Marathi	
2019	Benddkar	Jessy	Konkani	
2022	Hawahawai	Varsha	Marathi	
2022	Sher Shivraj	Badi Begum	Marathi	
2026	Public Kaa Hero	Shalini	Hindi	

=== Television ===
Year	Title	Role	Language	Notes
1989–1990	Mahabharat	Uttara	Hindi	
1989–1990	Mirza Ghalib: The Playful Muse	Lavani dancer	Hindi	Episodic role
1994	Chandrakanta	Roopmati Nagrani	Hindi	
1995–1996	Jhansi Ki Rani	Rani Laxmi Bai	Hindi	
1995	Aahat 1	Varsha	Hindi	Episodic role
1996–1997	Ardhangini		Hindi	
1997–1999	Tanha		Hindi	
1998	Ghar Jamai	Ms. Chamcham	Hindi	
2000–2001	Devdas Ki Paro		Hindi	
2000	Alvida Darling		Hindi	
2001	Vishnu Puran	Mohini	Hindi	
2002	Maa Shakti	Maya	Hindi	Episodic role
2003	Kabhie Kabhie	Padma / Priya	Hindi	Episodic role
2005	Tuzyavina	Sai Deshmukh	Marathi	
2007	Durgesh Nandinii		Hindi	
2008–2009	Ekach Maleche Mani	Varsha	Marathi	
2009	Jaane Pehchaane Se... Yeh Ajnabbi	Kamini Vardhan Singh	Hindi	
2009	Aye Dil-E-Nadaan		Hindi	
2009-2011	Man Udhan Varyache	Anuradha Mohite	Marathi	
2014	Jamai Raja	Kritika Khurana	Hindi	
2020-2024	Sukh Mhanje Nakki Kay Asta!	Nandini Shirke Patil (Maisaheb)	Marathi	
2024	Bigg Boss Marathi 5	Contestant	Marathi	7th Place
2026	Do Duniya Ek Dil	Padma Chauhan	Hindi	

=== Theatre ===
- Mahapur
- Ek Hoti Vaghinn
- Andhar Mazha Sobti
- Baki Itihaas
- Ashroonchi Zhali Phule
- Karti Premmat Padali
- Brahmachari (1982)
- Piano For Sale (2018)
- Sarkha Kahitari Hotay (2022)
- Devachem Nanv, Jietam Hanv (2025)

== Accolades ==
- 1987 – Maharashtra State Film Award for Best Actress for Gammat Jammat
- 1989 – Nominated, Maharashtra State Film Award for Best Actress for Hamaal De Dhamaal
- 1992 – Nominated, Maharashtra State Film Award for Best Actress for Ek Hota Vidushak
- 1993 – Nominated, Maharashtra State Film Award for Best Supporting Actress for Savat Mazi Ladki
- 1994 – Nominated, Maharashtra State Film Award for Best Actress for Yadnya
- 1998 – Maharashtra State Film Award for Best Actress for Paij Lagnachi
- 1998 – Nominated, Filmfare Award for Best Actress for Paij Lagnachi
- 2000 – Nominated, Screen Awards Best Actress (Marathi) For Film Tuch Majhi Suhasini
- 2016 – Krutadnyata Awards for Contribution in Marathi Cinema
- 2016 – Maharashtra State Film Award for Best Comedian for Hututu
- 2024 – Sakal Premier Awards for Contributions in Cinema
- 2024 – BIG Marathi Entertainment Awards for Evergreen Performer
- 2025 – Goa State Film Festival Lifetime Achievement Award
