= Pasant Aahe Mulgi (1989 film) =

1989 Indian Marathi-language film

- Directed by: V. N. Mayekar
- Written by: S. N. Narve
- Produced by: V. N. Mayekar
- Starring: Varsha Usgaonkar; Nitish Bharadwaj; Prashant Damle; Vandana Gupte; Sudhir Joshi
- Cinematography: Manohar Acharya
- Music by: Rishiraj
- Production company: Chaitanya Chitra
- Release date: 5 December 1989
- Country: India
- Language: Marathi

Pasant Aahe Mulgi (transl. I Have Liked the Girl) is a 1989 Marathi language drama film directed by V. N. Mayekar and produced by Chaitanya Chitra. It stars Varsha Usgaonkar, Nitish Bhardwaj in lead role while Prashant Damle, Sudhir Joshi and Vandana Gupte in supporting roles. The music was composed by Rishiraj.

== Cast ==
- Varsha Usgaonkar as Madhu
- Nitish Bharadwaj as Bansi Dhurandar
- Shrikant Moghe as Chandrasen Dhurandar
- Prashant Damle as Shashi
- Sudhir Joshi as Siddeshwar/Madhu's Uncle
- Shashank Bawkar as Mohan
- Vandana Gupte as Sushanta
- Raja Mayekar as File No 5
- Kishore Nandlaskar as Sahebrao

== Music ==
No.	Title	Performer	Ref(s)
1	"He Ganraya Sansari Majha"	Anuradha Paudwal	
2	"Dena Na Majh Pen Dena"	Sudesh Bhosle	
3	"Ya Nachuya Gaoya"	Sadhna Sargam	
4	"Sang aala ranga Tarun jhalya Disha"	Sudesh Bhosle; Anuradha Paudwal	
5	"Techi Purush Deivaye"		
