= Hafta Bandh =

- Directed by: Deepak Balraj Vij
- Written by: Salim Haidar
- Produced by: Deepak Balraj Vij
- Starring: Jackie Shroff; Aditya Pancholi; Varsha Usgaonkar; Ekta Sohini
- Edited by: Vinod Nayak; Prashant Khedekar
- Music by: Bappi Lahiri
- Release date: 12 July 1991
- Country: India
- Language: Hindi

Hafta Bandh (Week off) is a 1991 action film directed and produced by Deepak Balraj Vij. The film stars Jackie Shroff, Aditya Pancholi, Varsha Usgaonkar, Ekta Sohini in the lead roles.

== Plot ==
This is the story of conflict between the honest cop Bajrang Tiwari and the extortionist Firangi Paisewala. Firangi's goons extort Hafta (weekly money) from poor businessmen and local corrupt cops help them. Fearless inspector Bajrang kills the goon leader Kartoos in an encounter. Thereafter, a fight starts between Bajrang and Firangi Paisewala.

== Cast ==
- Jackie Shroff as Inspector Bajrang Tiwari
- Aditya Pancholi as Iqbal
- Varsha Usgaonkar as Maria
- Ekta Sohini as Rubina
- Sadashiv Amrapurkar as Firangi Paisewala
- Charan Raj as Inspector K. L. D. Rokade
- Anand Balraj as Madan Chikna
- Balbinder Dhami as John
- Siddharth Ray as Kartoos
- Sulabha Deshpande as Bajrang's mother
- Kishori Shahane as Bajrang's sister-in-law
- Ramesh Bhatkar as Harish Tiwari

== Soundtrack ==
Lyrics: Javed Akhtar

Song	Singer
"Kyun Soch Mein"	Asha Bhosle, Amit Kumar
"Yaar Masti Mein Ga"	Anuradha Paudwal, Sudesh Bhosle
"Dekho Jidhar"	Kumar Sanu
"Ae Haseena"	Kumar Sanu
