= Mohsin Khan (Pakistani actor and cricketer) =

Pakistani cricket coach and former cricketer

Mohsin Hassan Khan
Personal information
- Full name: Mohsin Hasan Khan
- Born: 15 March 1955 (age 71); Karachi, Federal Capital Territory, Pakistan
- Batting: Right-handed
- Bowling: Right-arm medium
- Role: Batsman

International information
- National side: Pakistan (1977–1986)
- Test debut (cap 79): 18 January 1980 v England
- Last Test: 20 November 1986 v West Indies
- ODI debut (cap 17): 16 March 1977 v West Indies
- Last ODI: 2 December 1986 v India

Domestic team information
- Years: Team
- 1970: Pakistan Railways B
- 1971: Pakistan Railways A
- 1972–1973: Karachi Blues
- 1973–1974: Karachi Whites
- 1974–1978: Sind
- 1975–1986: Habib Bank Limited

Career statistics
Competition	Test	ODI	FC	LA
Matches	48	75	192	117
Runs scored	2,709	1,877	11,274	3,077
Batting average	37.10	26.81	38.87	29.58
100s/50s	7/14	6/16	31/40	16/36
Top score	200	128*	246	119
Balls bowled	86	12	1,128	116
Wickets	0	1	14	4
Bowling average	–	5.00	39.14	26.50
5 wickets in innings	–	0	0	0
10 wickets in match	–	0	0	0
Best bowling	–	1/2	2/13	1/0
Catches/stumpings	34/–	13/–	141/–	32/–
- Source: CricketArchive, 21 August 2012

Mohsin Hasan Khan (Urdu: محسن حسن خان; born 15 March 1955) is a Pakistani cricket coach, former actor and former cricketer who played in 48 Test matches and 75 One Day Internationals between 1977 and 1986 mainly as an opening batsman.

== Early and personal life ==
Born in Karachi to a father who was an officer in the Pakistan Navy and a United States-educated mother who was a teacher and vice-principal, Mohsin excelled at sports early on, in tennis, swimming and cricket, and even went on to become junior badminton champion of Pakistan.

Mohsin married Bollywood film actress Reena Roy in 1983. He divorced Roy in the 1990s and gained custody of their daughter, Sanam. He later remarried and lost custody of the daughter. Mohsin currently lives in Karachi, Pakistan and his daughter, Sanam, now lives with her mother in India.

== Cricket career ==
Playing as the opener for Pakistan against India at Lahore in 1982–83, he scored 101 not out in Pakistan's second-innings total of 135/1. This is the lowest team score in Test cricket to have included a century.

Mohsin was one of a minority of South Asian players to come to terms with conditions in Australia and England, scoring two consecutive centuries in Australia in 1983/84 and becoming the first Pakistani batsman to score a Test double century at Lord's, which he did earlier in 1982.

== Post-retirement ==
=== Actor ===
Mohsin had a brief career as an actor in the Indian film industry, starting with J P Dutta's 1989 film Batwara. His biggest success in Bollywood was Mahesh Bhatt's crime thriller Saathi (1991), co-starring Aditya Pancholi and Varsha Usgaonkar. He also acted in several films in Pakistan in the 1990s, where he was considered "integral to the mini-revival of Lollywood", with hits such as Haathi Mere Saathi (1993) and Ghunghat (1996).

=== Cricket administrator ===
On 2 March 2010, Mohsin Khan was named Iqbal Qasim's successor as chief selector of the Pakistan national cricket team. He accepted the role turned down by former Captain Saeed Anwar. Mohsin was Pakistan's fourth chief of selectors in the 12 months of 2009–10. He was appointed as interim coach of the Pakistan team on 3 October 2011 while the PCB formed a committee to search for a certified coach. Mohsin Khan was removed as interim coach once Dav Whatmore was selected as Pakistan's permanent coach in early 2012. Since being removed as interim coach, Mohsin Khan has applied for the coaching position on several occasions without any success. He is currently based in Karachi and can be seen on various private TV channels.

== Legacy ==
Writing in 1998 for Dawn News, Lateef Jafri called him a "tall and elegant-looking opener" and that he "was a delightful stroke-maker and perhaps none could hit the ball with such abandon and success all round the wicket."

In 2020, sportswriter Shamya Dasgupta listed Mohsin among Pakistan's five most stylish batsmen, noting that he retired at 31 to pursue acting in India and highlighting his performance on the 1983–84 tour of Australia, where he scored 390 runs at 43.33 against a pace attack including Dennis Lillee, Geoff Lawson, Rodney Hogg and Carl Rackemann; Dasgupta argues that his height, technique against bounce, and elegance set him apart and that a longer career would have further benefited Pakistan.

In 2020, Wisden ranked Mohsin and Mudassar Nazar ninth among the best opening partnerships, noting their 54 Test innings together at an average stand of 39.55 (1981–86). The piece characterizes Mudassar as technically orthodox and durable, and Mohsin as stylish and fluent, arguing that their steady accumulation, rather than expansive stroke-play, made them a dependable pairing that helped signal Pakistan's future approach.

== Filmography ==
Year	Title	Role	Country	Notes
1989	Batwara	Thakur Rajendra Singh	India	Film debut; Nominated – Filmfare Award for Best Supporting Actor
1991	Fateh	Salim	India	
1991	Gunehgar Kaun	Inspector Ravi Kumar	India	
1991	Pratikar	Inspector Suraj Singh	India	
1991	Saathi	Amar	India	Best-known film as lead role
1992	Laat Saab	C.B.I. Inspector Jayant Mathur	India	
1993	Jannat		Pakistan	
1993	Insaniyat		Pakistan	
1993	Haathi Mere Saathi		Pakistan	
1994	Madam X	Inspector Vijay	India	
1994	Beta		Pakistan	
1996	Ghunghat	Kamal	Pakistan	
1996	Kurrion Ko Daley Dana		Pakistan	
1997	Mahaanta	Raj Malhotra	India	
