= Savat Mazi Ladki =

- Directed by: Smita Talwalkar
- Produced by: Smita Talwalkar
- Starring: Mohan Joshi; Neena Kulkarni; Varsha Usgaonkar; Prashant Damle
- Distributed by: Everest Entertainment
- Release date: 30 August 1993 (Maharashtra)
- Country: India
- Language: Marathi

Savat Mazi Ladki (transl. My Husband's Dear Second Wife) is a 1993 Indian Marathi-language comedy film directed and produced by Smita Talwalkar and distributed by Everest Entertainment.

The film was released in Maharashtra on 30 August 1993 and stars Mohan Joshi, Neena Kulkarni, Varsha Usgaonkar and Prashant Damle in lead roles. At Maharashtra State Film Awards Film Won Many Awards Including Maharashtra State Film Award for Best Second Film, Maharashtra State Film Award for Best Actress For Kulkarni, Maharashtra State Film Award for Best Actor For Joshi, Maharashtra State Film Award for Best Supporting Actress For Usgaonkar And Maharashtra State Film Award for Best Supporting Actor For damle.

== Synopsis ==
A man is cursed with the lure while a woman is blessed with control. This is a time-tested universal truth which continues to be the same in the 20th century as well. Dr. Madhukar Hirve (Mohan Joshi), also known as Madhu, and Seema (Neena Kulkarni) are a happy married couple in Pune. Madhu is a well-known surgeon and Seema is a simple, god-fearing, perfect stereotype of a devoted Indian housewife. Madhu's anesthetist colleague, Dr. Dinesh Kirtikar (Prashant Damle), is a bachelor with good sense of humour, and Dr. Beena Karnik (Varsha Usgaonkar) soon joins as Madhu's personal assistant in his hospital. Madhu is instantly attracted to Beena during her tenure, while Dinesh is also trying his luck with her. However, Madhu eventually takes the chance and begins an extramarital affair with Beena, who also gives in to his advances. After discovering Madhu's progress in his affair, Seema comes up with a plan and accordingly brings Beena home as her husband's second wife in spite of being married to him. She treats Beena with lot of love and affection and changes her own lifestyle to teach her husband a lesson. Will Seema be able to make Madhu realise his mistake with her humble ways?

== Cast ==
- Mohan Joshi as Dr. Madhukar Hirve (Madhu)
- Neena Kulkarni as Seema Madhukar Hirve
- Varsha Usgaonkar as Dr. Beena Karnik
- Prashant Damle as Dr. Dinesh Kirtikar
- Ramesh Bhatkar as Pradeep (Madhu's childhood friend)
- Amita Khopkar as Mrs. Bendre (Seema's friend and Beena's maternal aunt)
- Sudhir Joshi as Dadasaheb Hirve (Madhu's older brother)
- Jaymala Inamdar as Narmada Dadasaheb Hirve (Madhu's sister-in-law)
- Sushant Shelar as Sanju Dadasaheb Hirve (Dadasaheb and Narmada's oldest son)
- Shubhangi Damle as Mangala Bai (Seema's neighbour)
- Anand Abhyankar as a doctor with Madhu at the surgeons' conference in Mahabaleshwar
