= Sone Ki Lanka =

- Theatrical release poster
- Directed by: Ajay Kashyap
- Written by: Naeem-Ezaz (dialogues)
- Screenplay by: Geeta Kashyap
- Story by: Ajay Kashyap
- Produced by: Rajendra Patel
- Starring: Jeetendra; Jayapradha; Chunky Pandey; Varsha Usgaonkar
- Cinematography: Aloke Das Gupta
- Edited by: Ram Kishore Prasad
- Music by: Anand–Milind
- Production company: R.S.Films
- Release date: 4 August 1992
- Country: India
- Language: Hindi

Sone Ki Lanka (transl. Island of Gold) is a 1992 Hindi-language action film, produced by Rajendra Patel on R.S.Films banner and directed by Ajay Kashyap. Starring Jeetendra, Jayapradha, Chunky Pandey, Varsha Usgaonkar and music composed by Anand–Milind.

== Plot ==
Mohit (Jeetendra) and Rohit (Chunkey Pandey) attain their youth while working in a motor garage right from their childhood. Each one of them is prepared to lay his life for the other if time demands so. The uppermost aspiration of Rohit's life is to become a multi-millionaire. In order to achieve this, he entices Romu (Varsha Usgaonkar) into the nest of his love, but this dream is shattered to smithereens when he finds out that Romu is poor as himself and is also nursing the same desire as his own. On the other hand, Mohit has a burning desire to grind Kamal Rai (Sadashiv Amprapurkar) to dust because he had taken over entire wealth of Mohit's father after murdering and is enjoying it unlawfully. During Mohit's revengeful pursuit he is joined by Vinny (Shakti Kapoor) and Reema Devi (Reema Lagoo) who are victims of Kamal Rai's villainy. Now the density plays its hand Kamal Rai is reunite this entire wealth is the sole aim of Mohit's life. To achieve this, he successfully wins the heart of Tejal (Jaya Prada) who is the daughter of Kamal Rai. Rohit becomes a formidable obstacle between the two lovers & wants to eliminate Mohit. During this tense drama of vengeance, Vinny gets killed at the hands of Rohit and Mohit kills Romu.

== Cast ==
- Jeetendra as Mohit
- Jayapradha as Tejal
- Chunky Pandey as Rohit
- Varsha Usgaonkar as Romu / Ram Pyari
- Shakti Kapoor as Vinny
- Satyendra Kapoor as Madhav
- Sadashiv Amrapurkar as Kamal Rai
- Pankaj Dheer as Naughty
- Reema Lagoo as Reema Devi
- Tiku Talsania as Kewal Lal
- Aparajita as Mohit's mom
- Subbiraj as Dayalu Ram
- Bob Christo as Goon who attacks Vinny
- Kunika as Honey

== Soundtrack ==
#	Title	Singer(s)
1	"Sar Pe Topi Kali"	Mohammad Aziz, Kavita Krishnamurthy
2	"Tere Pyar Ki Bulbul"	Udit Narayan, Sadhana Sargam
3	"Jeene Ka Marne Ka"	Amit Kumar, Kavita Krishnamurthy
4	"Aankhon Aankhon Mein"	Abhijeet Bhattacharya, Sadhana Sargam
5	"Maine Pee Tu Ne Pee"	Kavita Krishnamurthy
6	"Aage Aage Ek Hasina"	Abhijeet Bhattacharya, Mangal Singh
