= Batwara =

1989 Indian film by J. P. Dutta

- Theatrical release poster
- Directed by: J. P. Dutta
- Screenplay by: J. P. Dutta
- Dialogues by: O. P. Dutta
- Story by: J. P. Dutta
- Produced by: Salim Akhtar
- Starring: Dharmendra; Vinod Khanna; Dimple Kapadia; Poonam Dhillon; Mohsin Khan; Shammi Kapoor; Asha Parekh; Kulbhushan Kharbanda; Amrish Puri; Amrita Singh
- Narrated by: Amitabh Bachchan
- Cinematography: Ishwar R. Bidri
- Edited by: Deepak Wirkud
- Music by: Laxmikant–Pyarelal
- Production company: Aftab Pictures
- Distributed by: Aftab Pictures
- Release date: 14 July 1989
- Running time: 181 minutes
- Country: India
- Language: Hindi
- Budget: ₹est.30-33 million
- Box office: ₹100 million

Batwara is a 1989 Indian Hindi-language action drama film directed by J.P. Dutta. The film features an ensemble cast of Dharmendra, Vinod Khanna, Dimple Kapadia, Amrita Singh, Poonam Dhillon, Mohsin Khan, Shammi Kapoor, Asha Parekh, Kulbhushan Kharbanda and Amrish Puri. The film centres around a long-standing friendship between an aristocratic (Khanna) and a low-caste cop (Dharmendra) is broken due to the former turning vengeful due to the death of his brother at the hands of the peasants, and that how the latter stands up to him.

Batwara released worldwide on 14 July 1989, and received mostly positive reviews from critics. Commercially, it was a hit at the box office and was the 9th highest grossing film of 1989.

== Plot ==
Sumer and Vikram are two close friends, whose close bond is well known in the village. Sumer serves as a cop. Vikram belongs to the landlords.

The film is set post-independence, and a new land sealing law is drafted by the Government, which states that individuals cannot own land beyond a certain limit. This is a big blow to the Thakurs, since they own hundreds of acres of land. As per the new law, they would have surrendered the excess land to the government, which would be distributed to the farmers. The Bade Thakur and his eldest son Deven cannot come to terms with this new change. Deven plans a plot, in which he will distribute the land amongst their relatives by back dating the transaction dates. For this, they would need signature / thumb impressions of the farmers who are tilling the land (the land is mortgaged to the Thakurs). The Sarpanch (Village Head) is on their side and agrees to help in manipulating the records as well as convincing the farmers to give their approval.

They have a meeting, wherein the farmers are adamant about sticking with their land. A heated argument leads to Deven getting panicked and shooting from his rifle, killing one villager. This infuriates the rest, and the mob lynch him. Vikram rushes back to his village to perform the last rites of his brother. He cannot bear the pain of the loss of his brother and sets off towards the dwellings of the farmer with his rifle. He kills many farmers and sets fire to their homes. From there, he escapes to the ravines and joins the bandits. Vikram gets his gang. In return, the bandits get money and protection from the influential Thakur family. Meanwhile, Vikram's youngest brother Rajendra who is also a cop, returns to his village. He is disappointed to see that his brother has turned into a bandit. His father urges him to protect Vikram from the law and exact revenge from the villagers who have defied their supremacy. Rajendra, true to his vow as a cop, refuses to do this.

When Sumer returns to his village, he cannot come to terms with what has happened and is deeply anguished that his best friend has done it. He marries his love interest, Jina, immediately, since she is orphaned as her brother was killed by Vikram. Sumer meets Vikram and declares that this is the end of their friendship. Meanwhile, Bade Thakur (Vikram's Dad) invites Hanumant Thakur (Rajendra's Junior Cop) to suppress the rebellion led by Sumer. Hanumant says that his hands are tied by his boss Rajendra. Bade Thakur arranges for his transfer, and Hanumant takes charge from Rajendra. He then releases a reign of terror. In one such incident, he kicks pregnant Jina, which causes miscarriage. This infuriates Sumer, and he attacks the police station, kills all the cops and assumes that Hanumant has also died, but he survives. He loots the arsenal from the police and distributes it to the villagers. Now Sumer also turns a bandit and joins with the rival gang of Vikram.

This gives rise to a game of cat and mouse. Sumer loots the granary of the Thakurs, and Vikram loots the money they earned after selling the produce in the market. In response, Sumer loots the Haveli (Mansion) of the Thakurs. At this point, Rajendra is restored back to his position and takes charge of the situation. Vikram now plans to burn up the entire village. Meanwhile, Vikram's gang leader plots to get him killed in a police encounter by leaking this information to the police for a hefty price. As planned, Vikram arrives in the village, but is trapped by the police. He manages to escape, but most of his gang members are killed. Sumer plans to retaliate by raiding the Haveli of the Thakurs once more. It is now clear that there would be a major showdown between the two rivals. Rajendra gets to investigate the rebellion and comes across brutalities committed by Hanumant. He plans to get him and his accomplices suspended from the police force. Hanumant plans to eliminate Rajendra in the upcoming showdown between the two rivals. This is overheard by a cop, who relays this to Vikram. At this point, the two ladies (Sumer's wife and Vikram's wife) intervene. They reveal how the gang leaders of their respective gangs are betraying them for money.

Sumer and Vikram now join hands, first eliminate the leaders of their respective gangs and then reach the designated point where the showdown is supposed to happen. The police are already present there and have trapped them well. They feign to surrender and kidnap Hanumant. Later, they rekindle their memories of childhood and kill Hanumant like a hunting a wild boar. Meanwhile, bullets are piercing their bodies like a cold hailstorm (just as they had described in one of their childhood memories).

== Cast ==
- Dharmendra as Sumer Singh
- Vinod Khanna as Vikram Singh
- Dimple Kapadia as Jinna
- Poonam Dhillon as Priya
- Amrita Singh as Roop
- Mohsin Khan as Thakur Rajendra Singh
- Shammi Kapoor as Bade Thakur
- Asha Parekh as Bade Thakur's wife
- Amrish Puri as Hanumant Singh
- Vijayendra Ghatge as Devan Singh
- Neena Gupta as Devan's wife
- Kulbhushan Kharbanda as Sarpanch
- Amrit Pal as Farmer
- Avtar Gill as Kalla Daku
- Bharat Kapoor as Daku Shakti Singh
- Ram Mohan
- Arun Bakshi
- Amitabh Bachchan as Narrator

== Soundtrack ==
The lyrics were penned by Hasan Kamal.

1. "Ye Ishq Dunk Bichhua Ka, Are Isse Raam Bachaye" – Lata Mangeshkar, Ila Arun
2. "Thare Vaste Re Dhola Nain Mhare Jage" – Anuradha Paudwal, Kavita Krishnamurthy, Alka Yagnik
3. "Jo Mai Aisa Janati Prit Kiye Duhkh Hoy" – Anuradha Paudwal, Kavita Krishnamurthy
4. "Aa Idhar Aa Meri Jaan Tujhko Mai Jawani Ka Jalwa Dikha Du" – Kavita Krishnamurthy, Sudesh Bhosle, Mohammed Aziz
5. "Zindagi Wafa Kare" - Suresh Wadkar, Mohammed Aziz
