= Kishore Pradhan =

Indian Marathi film and theatre actor (1936–2019)

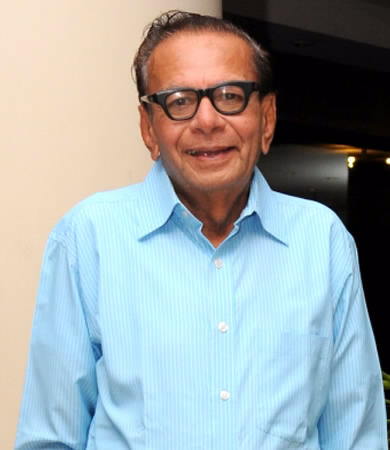
- Pradhan in 2013
- Died: 11 January 2019
- Occupation: Actor

Kishore Pradhan (1936–2019) was an Indian Marathi film and theatre actor. He was known for Hindi films like Jab We Met, Lage Raho Munnabhai, McMafia and Jack Irish.

== Biography ==
Pradhan was born into a Hindu family in Nagpur in 1936. He started acting while at school. He graduated from Morris College in Nagpur where he used to act in college festivals and later started the theatre group Natraj. Subh Lagna Savdhaan was his last Marathi film.

On 11 January 2019, Pradhan died at the age of 86.

== Filmography ==
Year	Film	Role	Notes
1990	Shejari Shejari	Nadkarni	
2007	Me Shivajiraje Bhosale Boltoy	V Goplakrishnan, Bank Manager	Marathi film
2007	Jab We Met	Station master	
2010	City of Gold	Khaitaan Seth	Lalbaug Parel in Marathi
2017	FU: Friendship Unlimited	Mohen Jo Daro	
2017	Brave Heart (Jidd Jagnyachi)	Kharkhanis Aajoba	
2018	Ye Re Ye Re Paisa	Aditya 's Grandfather	
2019	Shubh Lagna Savdhan		

== Television ==
Year	Title	Role	Network	Notes
2018	Jack Irish	Shapura Youth Club	ABC1	
2018	McMafia	Radnan Ali	BBC One, AMC	
1997	Zabaan Sambhal Ke	Murda	DD Metro	
1998–2001	Hum Sab Ek Hain	Khachroo’s Family Doctor	Sony Entertainment Television	
2002-2003	Shubh Mangal Savadhan	Vinay's father	Sahara Entertainment	
2011	Adaalat	Yaswant Lohar	Sony Entertainment Television	Episode 65: "Raaz Chauthe Chor Ka"
