= J. P. Dutta =

Indian filmmaker (born 1949)

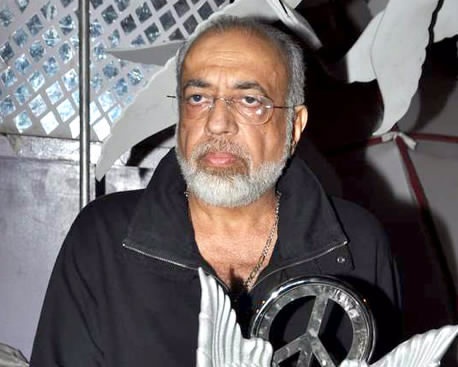
- Dutta in 2013
- Born: Jyoti Prakash Dutta; Bombay, Bombay State, India (now Mumbai, Maharashtra)
- Occupations: Film director, producer, writer
- Years active: 1985– present
- Notable work: Ghulami; Yateem; Batwara; Kshatriya; Border
- Spouse: Bindiya Goswami
- Parent: O. P. Dutta (father)

Jyoti Prakash Dutta is an Indian film director, writer and producer who works in Hindi cinema. He is best known for Ghulami (1985), Yateem (1988), Batwara (1989), Kshatriya (1993) and Border (1997).

== Personal life ==
Dutta is married to the Bollywood film actress Bindiya Goswami with whom he has two daughters Nidhi Dutta and Siddhi Dutta. Nidhi is also a film writer and a producer.

== Career ==
He headed the feature film section jury for the National Film Awards (2010), according to sources in the Union Ministry of Information and Broadcasting. He went on to make and direct successful films like Ghulami, Yateem, Batwara, Kshatriya and Border.

== Film Production ==
J. P. Dutta owns the film production company – J. P. Films.

== Filmography ==
Year	Film	Director	Producer	Star cast	Notes/Links
1985	Ghulami	Yes		Dharmendra, Reena Roy, Smita Patil, Naseeruddin Shah, Mithun Chakraborty, Anita Raj	
1988	Yateem	Yes		Sunny Deol, Farah, Danny Denzongpa, Kulbhushan Kharbanda, Amrish Puri, Sujata Mehta	
1989	Batwara	Yes		Dharmendra, Vinod Khanna, Dimple Kapadia, Poonam Dhillon, Amrita Singh, Mohsin Khan, Asha Parekh, Amrish Puri	
1989	Hathyar	Yes		Dharmendra, Sanjay Dutt, Rishi Kapoor, Asha Parekh, Amrita Singh, Sangeeta Bijlani	
1993	Kshatriya	Yes		Sunil Dutt, Dharmendra, Vinod Khanna, Rakhee Gulzar, Sunny Deol, Sanjay Dutt, Meenakshi Seshadri, Raveena Tandon, Divya Bharti	
1997	Border	Yes	Yes	Sunny Deol, Jackie Shroff, Suniel Shetty, Akshaye Khanna, Tabu, Pooja Bhatt, Rakhee Gulzar	
2000	Refugee	Yes	Yes	Abhishek Bachchan, Kareena Kapoor Khan, Suniel Shetty, Jackie Shroff, Reena Roy	
2003	LOC: Kargil	Yes	Yes	Sanjay Dutt, Ajay Devgn, Saif Ali Khan, Suniel Shetty, Akshaye Khanna, Abhishek Bachchan, Nagarjuna, Raveena Tandon, Rani Mukerji, Kareena Kapoor, Esha Deol	
2006	Umrao Jaan	Yes	Yes	Aishwarya Rai, Abhishek Bachchan, Shabana Azmi, Suniel Shetty	
2018	Paltan	Yes	Yes	Jackie Shroff, Arjun Rampal, Sonu Sood, Gurmeet Choudhary, Harshvardhan Rane, Siddhanth Kapoor	
2026	Border 2		Yes	Sunny Deol, Varun Dhawan, Diljit Dosanjh, Ahan Shetty, Mona Singh, Sonam Bajwa	A Sequel to Border (1997)
