= Shikari (1991 film) =

- DVD Cover
- Directed by: Umesh Mehra; Latif Faizev
- Written by: Vinay Shukla, Roskov Nikolai, Ulmas Umerbekov
- Produced by: Parvesh Mehra
- Starring: Mithun Chakraborty; Naseeruddin Shah; Varsha Usgaonkar; Irina Kushnareva; Amrish Puri
- Cinematography: S. Pappu, L. Travitsky
- Edited by: M. S. Shinde
- Music by: Anu Malik
- Production company: Eagle Films
- Release date: 12 April 1991
- Running time: 140 min.
- Countries: India; Soviet Union
- Languages: Hindi; Russian

Shikari (transl. "Hunter"), also known as Shikari: The Hunter in India and Po Zakonu Dzhungley (По закону джунглей, The Law of the Jungle) in the USSR, is a 1991 film, jointly directed by Umesh Mehra and Latif Faiziyev, mostly shot in Russia, starring Mithun Chakraborty, Irina Kushnareva, Varsha Usgaonkar, Naseeruddin Shah, and Amrish Puri.

== Plot ==
Shikari is the story of Shankar (Mithun Chakraborty), who earns his living by doing road shows along with Chanchal. Shankar happens to see a circus poster featuring Natasha (Irina Kushnareva) and begins to dream of working with her. By chance Shankar receives an offer to work in a Russian circus troupe where Natasha is also employed.

== Cast ==
- Naseeruddin Shah as Adarsh Kumar / Fakira
- Mithun Chakraborty as Shankar Kumar
- Irina Kushnareva as Natasha
- Varsha Usgaonkar as Chanchal
- Vinod Mehra as Chanchal's Father
- Gulshan Grover as Bob
- Amrish Puri as Nahar Singh
- Dara Singh as Bajrangi
- Anjana Mumtaz as Mrs. Bajrangi
- Amrit Pal as Hari Singh
- Achyut Potdar as Raja Sahib
- Rucha Gujrati as Young Chanchal
- Ali Asgar as Young Adarsh/Fakira
- Master Bunty as Young Shankar
- Makhmud Ismilov as Makhham

== Soundtrack ==
Shikari

Film score
- Released: 1991
- Genre: Feature film soundtrack
- Label: Weston Musicassettes/Tips Music

The music was composed by Anu Malik and the lyrics were written by Anand Bakshi.

| # | Song | Singer |
|---|---|---|
| 1 | "Mere Dost Hindustani" | Anuradha Paudwal |
| 2 | "I Love You" | Mohammed Aziz, Anuradha Paudwal |
| 3 | "Main Hoon Aflatoon" | Sudesh Bhosale, Sapna Mukherjee |
| 4 | "Duniya Mein Kitne Watan" | Kavita Krishnamurthy, Mohammed Aziz, Anuradha Paudwal |
| 5 | "Koki Koki Koki" | Anu Malik, Anuradha Paudwal |
| 6 | "Duniya O Duniya" | Sudesh Bhosale, Sapna Mukherjee |
| 7 | "Eena Meena Maeena Mo" | Mohammed Aziz |
| 8 | "Ye Duniya Ek Circus Hai" | Sudesh Bhosale |
| 9 | "Jo Aata Hai" | Amrish Puri |
