= Hasti =

- Poster
- Directed by: Ashok Gaekwad
- Written by: Karan Razdan
- Starring: Naseeruddin Shah; Jackie Shroff; Nagma
- Cinematography: Ashok Gunjal
- Edited by: Ashok Honda
- Music by: Anand–Milind
- Production company: Megha Arts
- Release date: 1993
- Country: India
- Language: Hindi

Hasti (lit. 'Existence') is a 1993 Bollywood film directed by Ashok Gaekwad and produced by Sandeep D. Shinde. It stars Naseeruddin Shah, Jackie Shroff, Nagma and Varsha Usgaonkar in pivotal roles.

== Plot ==
Narang is an accomplished and wealthy industrialist who lives with his daughter, Neena, in a palatial home. His daughter is now of marriageable age, and he would like her to marry Vicky, his associate Bhisham's son. But Neena is in love with a much poorer man named Jaikishan, alias Jaggu. When Neena informs her father that she would like to marry Jaggu, he summons Jaggu's mom, Shanti, and instantly recognizes her from his questionable past. He belittles her, humiliates her and asks her to leave his house. When Jaggu finds out, he goes to meet Narang and asks him to change his decision. However, he too gets insulted and is asked to leave, never to see or speak to Neena again. Jaggu promises him that he will return within one year and by that time he will be even more wealthy than Narang. Jaggu befriends a homeless man named Vishal and together they set forth to meet Jaggu's deadline. Things are going pretty well for Jaggu, as he has been able to get a sizable loan from a bank, and has started his own construction business. This success has gotten him enemies, and one day someone places a bomb in his car. Jaggu survives, but is critically wounded and in need of blood. His blood group is the same as that of Vishal - but Vishal refuses to give any blood to save Jaggu. Shanti is shocked and appalled at this, and sets forth to find out why her son's closest friend refuses to help him in this dire time of need.

== Cast ==
- Naseeruddin Shah as Vishal
- Jackie Shroff as Jaikishan
- Nagma as Neena Narang
- Varsha Usgaonkar as Anita "Anu"
- Aruna Irani as Shanti
- Sadashiv Amrapurkar as Narang
- Shafi Inamdar as Bhisham
- Gulshan Grover as Vicky, Bhisham's son.
- Achyut Potdar as Contractor Ahluwalia
- Anant Jog as Dr Vinay
- Vikas Anand as Mohan Mehta
- Rakesh Bedi as Changu
- Rajesh Puri as Mangu
- Laxmikant Berde as Pasinger
- Gurbachchan Singh as Jagavar

== Soundtrack ==
#	Title	Singer(s)
1	"Mat Poochh Mere Mehboob"	Kumar Sanu, Mukul Agarwal, Sadhana Sargam
2	"Aage Se Peeche Se"	Abhijeet, Udit Narayan, Brownie Parashar
3	"Meri Kasam Teri Kasam"	Udit Narayan, Anuradha Paudwal
4	"Ladka Ladki Se Phansa"	Amit Kumar, Sadhana Sargam
5	"Main Pyasi Nadiya Hoon"	Suresh Wadkar, Sadhana Sargam
6	"Hissa Hai Tu Meri Zindagi Ka"	Udit Narayan
