= Kshatriya (film) =

1993 film by J. P. Dutta

- Theatrical release poster
- Directed by: J. P. Dutta
- Screenplay by: J. P. Dutta
- Dialogues by: O. P. Dutta
- Story by: J. P. Dutta
- Produced by: Sunder Das Sonkiya
- Starring: Sunil Dutt (Special Appearance); Dharmendra; Vinod Khanna; Sunny Deol; Sanjay Dutt; Meenakshi Sheshadri; Raveena Tandon; Divya Bharti; Raakhee; Sumalatha; Kabir Bedi; Puneet Issar; Prem Chopra
- Narrated by: Kulbhushan Kharbanda
- Cinematography: Nirmal Jani
- Edited by: Deepak Wirkud
- Music by: Laxmikant–Pyarelal
- Production company: Pushpa Movies
- Release date: 26 March 1993
- Running time: 187 minutes
- Country: India
- Language: Hindi

Kshatriya (transl. Warriors) is a 1993 Indian Hindi-language epic action drama film directed and written by J. P. Dutta. It stars an ensemble cast of Dharmendra, Vinod Khanna, Sunny Deol, Sanjay Dutt, Meenakshi Seshadri, Raveena Tandon, Divya Bharti, Rakhee Gulzar, Sumalatha, Kabir Bedi, Puneet Issar and Prem Chopra, with Sunil Dutt in a special appearance.

It was released worldwide on 26 March 1993.

Kshatriya is considered a unique case in Bollywood history where a massive, star-studded production was derailed not by its content, but by real-world events. Upon its release, the film registered record-breaking opening figures and was on a commercial trajectory toward blockbuster status. However, the film's theatrical run was abruptly cut short across India following the arrest of one of its lead actors, leading to its premature withdrawal from cinemas.

== Plot ==
This is a story about two warring royal Rajput families in Rajasthan, India, based in Surjangarh and Mirtagarh. The Mirtagarh family is headed by Maharaj Bhavani Singh, his wife Maheshwari Devi, their daughter Divya, and his younger brother Jaswant Singh. The Surjangarh family is headed by Maharaj Prithvi Singh, his wife Suman, his brother Devendra Pratap Singh, and Devendra's son Vijay Pratap Singh.

Vijay falls in love with Divya, but both families are against the marriage. The situation is made worse by Mirtagarh's diwan (bookkeeper), Ajay Singh, and his son, Shakti Singh. When Vijay comes to meet Divya, he is killed by Shakti, even though Bhavani never wanted him dead. On seeing Vijay's body, Divya commits suicide. Overwhelmed, Prithvi shoots and kills Bhavani in revenge, and is arrested by police officer Ganga Singh. While Prithvi is in prison, Jaswant returns from England with his newly wed English wife, Jenny. When he learns about the past events, he kills Devendra in revenge. Horrified by this bloodbath, Jenny, who is pregnant, leaves him for her native England, saying that she will give birth to their child at a place where there is love and peace. Both Prithvi and Jaswant vow to kill each other once Prithvi is released from prison. To get them away from the bloody feud, Prithvi's son, Vinay, and Bhavani's son, Vikram, are sent to England as children.

Twenty years later, Vinay and Vikram are the best of friends, living in London, England. Neelima, who is Vikram's cousin and Jaswant and late Jenny's daughter, also lives in London. Vinay and Neelima fall in love and want to marry, which could signal the end of the Surjangarh and Mirtagarh feud. Meanwhile, Ganga's daughter, Tanvi falls in love with Vikram. After completing their education from Oxford, the three youngsters – Vinay, Vikram, and Neelima – return to their families in India, with Tanvi to arrive a few days later.

Just then, Prithvi is released from prison. Jaswant challenges him to a sword fight, which Prithvi eagerly accepts. DIG Ganga Singh intervenes and stops them from killing each other. As the truth behind the feud is revealed to them, Vinay and Neelima are forbidden from entering a relationship. Despite the threats, they continue their forbidden romance. Wrongly assuming Vikram already knew, Vinay tells him that his father had killed Vikram's father. Later, enraged and seeking revenge, Vikram bursts into the Surjangarh mansion and shoots Prithvi. In a fit of rage, Vinay shoots back at Vikram.

While both Prithvi and Vikram survive and are recovering in a hospital, Vinay and Jaswant get into a fight outside. When Vinay assaults Jaswant, Neelima intervenes and slaps Vinay for hitting her father. This prompts Vinay to break off his relationship with Neelima, realizing that the feud will never end. Saddened by this break-up, Neelima attempts suicide but is saved by Madhu, Jaswant's beloved. However, Neelima tells Vinay that she cannot live without him and will again attempt suicide if he doesn't take her with him.

Alarmed, Vinay visits Jaswant and pleads with him to let him marry Neelima and end the feud. Jaswant refuses and tells Vinay to leave. As Vinay leaves, he is ambushed by Shakti, Ajay, and their men. It's then revealed to Vinay that Shakti Singh had killed his cousin, Vijay, and wants to kill him too. As Shakti tries to attack Vinay, Vinay overpowers and kills him with his own sword. In the skirmish that follows, Madhu gets shot by Ajay. Saddened by this, Jaswant kills Ajay, and Madhu dies in his arms. As promised to Madhu, he lets Neelima go with Vinay. Vinay and Neelima decide to return to England, marry, and settle there.

Vikram recovers from the hospital and challenges Prithvi to a sword fight. Maheshwari prevents Prithvi from accepting Vikram's challenge, telling him she has forgiven him for killing her husband, Bhavani, and that he should remember that. Prithvi promises her he will not kill Vikram. Vinay decides to accept Vikram's challenge instead, to uphold his father's honour. As Vikram and Vinay are dueling, their mothers, Maheshwari (accompanied by Tanvi) and Suman (accompanied by Neelima), intervene. The mothers decide to hurt themselves to stop their sons from fighting. Vinay and Vikram eventually stop, and the feud finally ends, with friendship and a relationship blossoming between the two families.

== Cast ==
Actor	Role	Description	Allegiance
Sunil Dutt	Maharaj Bhavani Singh	Jaswant's elder brother, Vikram's father	Mirtagarh
Dharmendra	Maharaj Prithvi Singh	Vinay's father	Surjangarh
Vinod Khanna	Raja Jaswant Singh	Bhavani's younger brother, Neelima's father	Mirtagarh
Sunny Deol	Vinay Pratap Singh	Prithvi's son, Neelima's boyfriend	Surjangarh
Sanjay Dutt	Vikram Singh	Bhavani's son, Tanvi's boyfriend	Mirtagarh
Meenakshi Seshadri	Madhu	Jaswant's beloved (after his wife's death)	Mirtagarh
Raveena Tandon	Neelima Singh	Jaswant and Jenny's daughter, Vinay's girlfriend	Mirtagarh
Divya Bharti	Tanvi Singh	Ganga's daughter, Vikram's girlfriend	Neutral
Raakhee	Maheshwari Devi	Bhavani's wife, Vikram's mother	Mirtagarh
Sumalatha	Suman Singh	Prithvi's wife, Vinay's mother	Surjangarh
Kabir Bedi	DIG Ganga Singh	Region's police chief, Tanvi's father	Neutral
Puneet Issar	Shakti Singh	Ajay's son, Mirtagarh's chief henchman	Mirtagarh
Prem Chopra	Ajay Singh	Shakti's father, Mirtagarh's diwan	Mirtagarh
Nafisa Ali	Jenny Singh	Jaswant's wife, Neelima's mother	Mirtagarh
Vijayendra Ghatge	Vijayendra Singh	Surjangarh's diwan	Surjangarh
Dolly Minhas	Divya Singh	First-born daughter of Bhavani and Maheshwari	Mirtagarh
Salim Fatehi	Vijay Pratap Singh	Devendra's son	Surjangarh
Pradeep Chaudhry	Raja Devendra Pratap Singh	Prithvi's younger brother, Vijay's father	Surjangarh
Navtej Hundal	Ashu Pal	Madhu's father	Mirtagarh

== Music and soundtrack ==
Kshatriya (Original Motion Picture Soundtrack)

Soundtrack album by Laxmikant–Pyarelal
- Released: 26 March 1993
- Recorded: 1992–1993
- Genres: Motion picture soundtrack, filmi
- Length: 39:37
- Language: Hindi
- Label: Tips
- Producer: Laxmikant–Pyarelal
External audio
- Kshatriya: Hello Hello on YouTube
- Kshatriya: Main Khichi Chali Aayi on YouTube
- Kshatriya: Dil Na Kisi Ka Jaaye on YouTube
- Kshatriya: Cham Cham Barso Pani on YouTube
- Kshatriya: Main Ek Pyaasi Kali on YouTube
- Kshatriya: Sapne Mein Sakhi on YouTube
- Kshatriya: Tune Kiya Tha Vada on YouTube

The film's music was composed by Laxmikant–Pyarelal and the lyrics of the songs were penned by Anand Bakshi.

Song	Singer
"Hello Hello"	Mohammed Aziz
"Main Khichi Chali"	Alka Yagnik
"Dil Na Kisi Ka Jaye Jaan Jaye To Jaye"	Lata Mangeshkar, Kavita Krishnamurthy
"Chham Chham Barsa Pani"	Sadhana Sargam, Kavita Krishnamurthy
"Main Ek Pyasi Kali"	Kavita Krishnamurthy
"Sapne Mein Sakhi"	Kavita Krishnamurthy
"Tune Kiya Tha"	Kavita Krishnamurthy

== Controversy and theatrical withdrawal ==
Kshatriya is considered a rare anomaly in Indian cinema: a high-budget, multi-starrer blockbuster that didn't fail due to poor filmmaking, but was instead dismantled by the volatile political climate of its era. While the film had a record-breaking opening, its theatrical run was cut short due to the legal crisis surrounding one of its leads, Sanjay Dutt.

Kshatriya was released on 26 March 1993. This was just two weeks after the 1993 Mumbai Serial Blasts (March 12). In April 1993, while the film was still playing in all of the originally allocated theatres, Sanjay Dutt was arrested under the TADA Act for the possession of illegal firearms. The public sentiment shifted instantly. The actor, loved by masses at the time, saw his popularity vanish overnight as he became an object of public scorn due to the severity of the charges. Following the arrest and the subsequent public outcry, the atmosphere in Mumbai and many parts of India became extremely volatile.

Several political groups and activists protested against the film's screening. Fearing violence at cinema halls and damage to property, theatre owners and distributors chose to pull the film from screens just as it was entering its peak weeks. The focus shifted entirely from the film’s grand scale (it featured an ensemble cast including Sunil Dutt, Dharmendra, Vinod Khanna, Sunny Deol and Sanjay Dutt) to the legal drama surrounding one of its stars.

Despite a record-breaking start towards becoming a blockbuster, the premature withdrawal meant the film could not recover its massive budget. J.P. Dutta's films were known for being expensive. Kshatriya lost its most profitable weeks because of the shutdown.

While Kshatriya has since gained a cult following on television and home media for its scale and performances, its original theatrical run remains a footnote in Bollywood history as a victim of unfortunate timing and legal turmoil.
