= Shubh Mangal Savdhan =

- Theatrical release poster
- Directed by: M.S.Salvi
- Produced by: M.S.Salvi
- Starring: Ashok Saraf; Varsha Usgaonkar; Rekha Rao; Laxmikant Berde
- Music by: Ashok Patki
- Production company: Amar Productions
- Release date: 11 June 1992
- Country: India
- Language: Marathi

Shubh Mangal Savdhan is a 1992 Indian Marathi-language drama film directed and produced by M.S. Salvi, features an ensemble cast of Ashok Saraf, Varsha Usgaonkar, Laxmikant Berde and Rekha Rao. The film was released on 11 June 1992 and met with Positive response from both audience and critics. It was year's highest grossing Marathi Film.

== Synopsis ==
Jaya and Suman, once close college friends, now harbor deep animosity. Jaya, romantically involved with Rajesh, faces the irony of him praising Suman to provoke her. Meanwhile, Rakesh, secretly in love with Jaya, becomes furious seeing her with Rajesh. Despite Jaya and Rajesh's marriage, Jaya's mother's well-intended advice complicates their relationship.

== Cast ==
- Ashok Saraf as Rajesh
- Varsha Usgaonkar as Jaya
- Laxmikant Berde as Driver
- Asha Kale as Rajesh's mother
- Nilu Phule as Rajesh's father
- Ravi Patwardhan
- Daya Dongre as Jaya's mother
- Sudhir Dalvi as Jaya's father
- Savita Malpekar as Rosy
- Rekha Rao as Suman
- Leela Gandhi
- Uday Tikekar as Rakesh
- Mohan Kotiwan
- Lata Arun
- Vasant Shinde
- Maya Jadhav

== Soundtrack ==
Shubh Mangal Savdhan

Soundtrack album by Ashok Patki
- Released: 1992
- Genre: Feature film soundtrack
- Language: Marathi

The music is composed by Ashok Patki. The songs are sung by Anuradha Paudwal, Kavita Krishnamurthy, Anupama Deshpande and Sudesh Bhosle.

=== Track listing ===
No.	Title	Singer(s)
1	"Sodun sare bahane"	Anuradha Paudwal; Sudesh Bhosle
2	"Every day Sunday"	Vinod Kumar
3	"Piwlya dhamak rangachi"	Anupama Deshpande; Kavita Krishnamurthy
4	"Naral sonyacha"	Sudesh Bhosle; Anupama Deshpande
