= Ssukh =

- Poster
- Directed by: Kirti Kumar
- Written by: Vijay Solanki (dialogues)
- Based on: Shejari Shejari by Ashok Patole
- Produced by: Govinda
- Starring: Govinda; Preeti Jhangiani; Chunky Pandey; Aarti Chhabria; Jackie Shroff
- Cinematography: Suneel K. Reddy
- Edited by: R. Rajendran
- Music by: Kamini Khanna; Nirmal Pawar
- Production company: Govinda No. One Entertainment
- Release date: 17 June 2005
- Country: India
- Language: Hindi

Ssukh (translation: Happiness) is a 2005 Bollywood comedy film directed by Kirti Kumar (credited as Kirti Ahuja) starring his brother Govinda, Preeti Jhangiani, Chunky Pandey, Aarti Chhabria and Jackie Shroff. The film was also produced by Govinda. The film was a remake of the 1990 Marathi film Shejari Shejari.

== Cast ==
- Govinda as Chandraprakash Sharma
- Preeti Jhangiani as Sushila Chandraprakash Sharma
- Chunky Pandey as Rakesh Verma
- Aarti Chhabria as Bhavna Rakesh Verma
- Jackie Shroff as Gaurishankar Yadav
- Mahesh Anand as Advocate Khalil Sheikh
- Rana Jung Bahadur as Patwardhan
- Prem Chopra as Judge
- Avtar Gill as Private Eye
- Pratima Kazmi as Bhavna's sister-in-law
- Sharat Saxena as Bhavna's brother

== Music ==
1. Aawajo Aawajo - Kumar Sanu
2. Dar Kahe Ko Re - Shreya Ghoshal, Udit Narayan
3. O Pran Piya - Jaspinder Narula
4. Ssukh Hai Mere - Udit Narayan
5. Suno Rato Me Kya - Udit Narayan, Alka Yagnik
6. Shola Badan - Sadhana Sargam

== Reception ==
Patcy N of Rediff.com wrote, "Ssukh is supposed to be a family entertainer. But watching it was so painful that it should be renamed to Dukh." Taran Adarsh of Bollywood Hungama gave the film 1 star out of 5, writing, "On the whole, Ssukh stands on a weak foundation [script] and that will prove to be its downfall."
