= Seby Coutinho =

Indian actor and playwright (1929–2000)

- Portrait of Coutinho
- Born: 5 September 1929; Bombay, British India
- Died: 9 January 2000 (aged 70); Holy Spirit Hospital, Maharashtra, India
- Other name: Charlie
- Education: St. Sebastian Goan High School
- Occupations: Actor; playwright; theatre director; composer; dancer; choreographer
- Employer(s): National Rayon Corporation Office, Fort, Bombay
- Notable work: Amchem Noxib; Bhuierantlo Munis
- Title: Founder of The Goan Cultural and Dramatic Society
- Spouse: Bella Coutinho

Seby Coutinho (5 September 1929 – 9 January 2000) was an Indian actor, playwright, director, composer, dancer, choreographer, and former singer known for his work in Konkani films and tiatr productions.

== Career ==
Coutinho made his initial foray into the Konkani tiatr stage under the guidance of Ernest Rebello, who provided him with an opportunity to act in the tiatr production titled Avoicho Gutt (Mother's Secret) at Princess Theatre in Bombay. His performance in this production, alongside Miss Marekin and Joao Bautist Lobo, garnered appreciation from the audience. However, Coutinho faced challenges in making progress within the professional tiatr scene, as achieving recognition on the commercial stage was not a straightforward task during that period. Consequently, he decided to explore alternative avenues. Joining the Fort Dramatic Company, Coutinho collaborated with John D'Cunha to write his own tiatr called Ekloch Put (Only Son). The production was staged in multiple locations with the local boys from Fort area, under the banner of the Fort Dramatic Company and received favorable responses from the audience. Concurrently, Coutinho took on minor roles in English plays. In 1953, he penned another tiatr titled Curddo Millionar (Blind Millionaire) and presented it through the Fort Dramatic Company. However, Coutinho, who was not accustomed to mingling with professional tiatrists, encountered difficulties in securing a place on the Bhangwadi stage in Bombay alongside established performers. To overcome these obstacles, Coutinho established connections with Francis "Chicken" Carneiro, ultimately forming a new theatrical group known as The Goan Dramatic and Cultural Society. Within this group, he collaborated with colleagues such as Cajdon D'Souza, Rico Rod, and Vincent Sernedo. Coutinho's talent as a composer became known, as he composed songs that were performed by other artists.

Coutinho, feeling dissatisfied with his group's performance, sought the opportunity to participate in C. Alvares' tiatr Borvonso through a recommendation from his friend B. Paul, a band leader. Despite singing two songs in the tiatr, Coutinho failed to make an impact as a vocalist. Despite his efforts, Coutinho's aspirations as a singer did not materialize as expected. Nonetheless, he persisted in his pursuit and leveraged his association with the tiatro make-up artist Camilo to secure an opportunity to sing a song in Alfred Rose's tiatr production, Yench Tem Karann (This is the Reason). Although his singing performance failed to create an impact, it was Alfred Rose who recognized Coutinho's true potential and advised him to focus on his acting abilities instead. Coutinho possessed skills as an artiste. Building upon his newfound confidence, Coutinho's acting talent was formally introduced to audiences by Alfred Rose in the tiatr production titled Dotor Advogad (Doctor Advocate). Coutinho's portrayal in this production was met with acclaim, attracting the attention of directors and earning him glowing reviews. Some even compared him to the Bollywood actor Pran, calling the former "Pran of the Konkani stage". Recognizing that acting was his true forte, Coutinho embraced his talent and embarked on a career as an actor, leaving behind his aspirations as a singer.

Throughout his career, Coutinho received many offers from popular directors and collaborated with known tiatrists such as J. P. Souzalin, C. Alvares, Prem Kumar, Alfred Rose, M. Boyer, Robin Vaz, Kid Boxer, Minguel Rod, Young Menezes, A. M. B. Rose, and Jacinto Vaz. Coutinho's performances consistently showcased improvement, as he studied each role and sought ways to enhance his characters through improvisation. Among Coutinho's achievements were his standout performances in plays like Khorkhos Ostori, Angounnenchi Okol, Vauraddi (The Labourer), Atam Konn Ghatki (Who now is a traitor?)," and Barabas (Barabbas), which resonated with audiences and garnered acclaim. His talent spanned a wide range of character roles, from comedic to serious, demonstrating his versatility. Moreover, Coutinho's skills extended beyond acting, as he was a ballroom and folk dancer. He choreographed numerous dance routines for prestigious institutions and organizations in Bombay, leaving an impact on the dance community. Coutinho has contributed his choreography to the Konkani film Amchem Noxib, and he can also be observed performing as a dancer in the movie. Parallel to his artistic pursuits, Coutinho maintained a full-time position at the National Rayon Corporation Office in Fort, Bombay, showcasing his commitment to both his professional and creative endeavors. He also made appearances in films such as Boglantt and Zababdari, further expanding his presence in the entertainment industry. Moreover, he assumed a principal role in the popular Goa TV series Ek Kahani, which was adapted from the Konkani novel Angounn by Damodar Mauzo.

Coutinho's contributions to the Konkani theater scene extended beyond acting and dancing. He ventured into writing and directing, creating several tiatrs of his own. Popular works include Ekloch Put, Curddo Millionar, Mhaka Guneanv Bhogos, Amche Disgras (Our Disgrace), Mhozo Oprad, Avoicho Ulhas (Mother's Joy), and Imtteache Bognnar. Through his productions, Coutinho aimed to address societal issues and convey moral messages, using the power of theater to inspire positive change. Coutinho left an impression with his portrayal of Barabbas in Robin Vaz's tiatr Barabas, which resonated with audiences. He was lauded for his nuanced performances and meticulous preparation, earning him a reputation as an intense and dedicated actor. Coutinho's artistic abilities extended beyond the stage, as he mastered various dance forms and blended Western and Goan folk dances. He instructed and presented a multitude of traditional folk dances at many significant events in the presence of important dignitaries. In addition to his theatrical achievements, Coutinho appeared in several Konkani films, including Amchem Noxib, Kortubancho Sonvsar, Boglantt, and Bhuierantlo Munis. His role in Boglantt received acclaim. Despite the passage of time, Coutinho remained an active participant in the Konkani theater community, regularly touring Goa and even Gulf countries with tiatro groups. Coutinho's acting prowess was characterized by his level of intensity, establishing him as a thespian who delved into the intricacies of his roles to authentically portray the essence of his characters. With a repertoire of over 450 tiatr performances across various productions, he also undertook tours as a tiatrist in Bombay, Poona, and East Africa.

== Personal life ==
Seby Coutinho was born on 5 September 1929, in Bombay, which was part of Bombay Presidency in British India to Francis Coutinho. He grew up in Cortalim, Goa, and later resided in Colvale. Coutinho's passion for singing, acting, and dancing emerged at a young age. He received his primary education at St. Sebastian Goan High School in Dabul, Bombay, where his love for literature and poetry blossomed. He garnered acclaim for his elocution and poetry reading abilities, consistently earning awards and recognition at the school level. His teachers and principal recognized his potential as an actor, often commenting on his talent during school performances. Known for his mimicry skills, Coutinho was affectionately referred to as "Charlie" by his friends due to his ability to impersonate Charlie Chaplin with accuracy. During his school years, Coutinho had opportunities to perform in English dramas, showcasing his acting abilities. Coutinho married Bella, a choreographer specializing in folk dances, and the couple welcomed a daughter named Jennifer, who went on to become a Konkani singer.

As of 1995, Coutinho resided with his family in Marol, Bombay. On 9 January 2000, Coutinho died at the Holy Spirit Hospital in Andheri, Mumbai, at the age of 70 following a short illness.

== Select filmography ==
=== Films ===
Year	Title	Role	Notes	Ref
1963	Amchem Noxib	Choreographer/dancer		
1970	Kortubancho Sonvsar			
1975	Boglantt			
1977	Bhuierantlo Munis			
2004	Zababdari			

=== Television ===
Year	Title	Role	Notes	Ref
	Ek Kahani	Lead role		
