= Miss Marekin =

Portuguese theatre actor and female impersonator

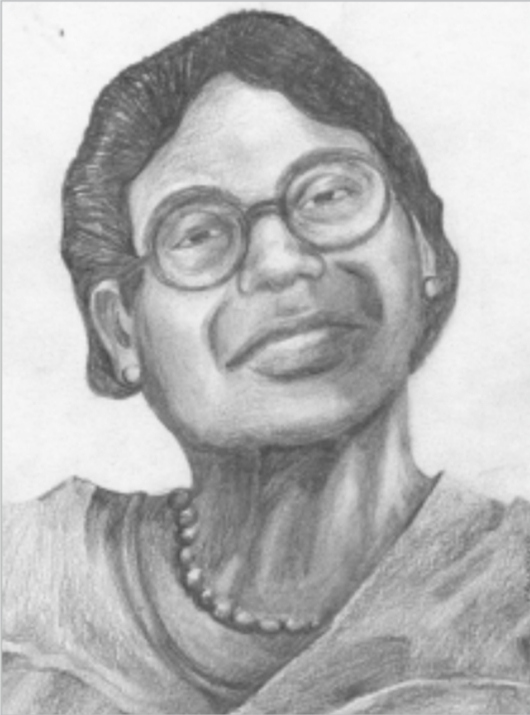
- Portrait of Fernandes
- Born: Thomas Fernandes; Bardes, Goa, Portuguese India
- Died: Bombay (now Mumbai, Maharashtra, India) (most likely)
- Occupations: Actor; female impersonator; tailor
- Years active: 1930s–1950s

Thomas Fernandes, known professionally as Miss Marekin, was a Portuguese theatre actor, female impersonator, and tailor who worked on the Konkani stage.

== Career ==
The inclusion of women in the Konkani tiatr stage was preceded by a scarcity of female performers. Consequently, male actors assumed female roles, some of whom displayed proficiency to the point of convincingly portraying women, writes director and playwright John Claro. Among these actors was Fernandes, who, over several decades, garnered recognition for his portrayal of female characters in Konkani tiatr, writes André Raphael Fernandes. Fernandes, alongside male artists such as Andrew Fernandes, Remmie Colaco, and Effie, played a pivotal role in sustaining and invigorating the Konkani tiatr tradition. Their contributions not only ensured the survival of the art form during the absence of female performers but also infused it with grace and vitality, as noted by writer Irene Cardozo.

Fernandes established a close association with J. P. Souzalin, a Konkani playwright and singer, frequently featuring in his tiatr productions. Furthermore, Fernandes gained acclaim for his comedic role in Mhozo Nouro (My Boyfriend), a theatrical production by singer and composer Minguel Rod, which showcased his talent. Writer Fausto V. da Costa lauds Fernandes as a distinguished character actor who portrayed various roles, including mothers, troublesome mother-in-laws, female gossips, aunts, and other comedic characters. Fernandes also collaborated with other popular directors of his time, including Jacinto Vaz, C. Alvares, and, in later years, Prem Kumar.

Fernandes was a member of the Kid-Young-Rod trio, led by Minguel Rod, alongside Kid Boxer and Young Menezes. The trio gained acclaim, and performances under their banner were consistently sold out. The members of the group included Diniz Simoes, Master Vaz, Edward Almeida, C. Pereira, Miss Julie, Miss Estrela, and Cruz Jazzwala. As time went on, some members of Fernandes's group departed and were replaced by emerging tiatrists. During this period, Fernandes collaborated with Miss Julie and Miss Ida, two female impersonators known for their portrayal of female characters. The prefix 'Miss' was added to their stage names to reflect their specialization.

Fernandes and Minguel Rod shared a longstanding association, dating back to Rod's early years as an aspiring artist in Bombay (now Mumbai). Fernandes even appeared in one of Rod's untitled short plays, performed in Bombay prior to 1941. Throughout his career, Fernandes achieved recognition as one of the leading tiatrists, alongside artists such as João Agostinho Fernandes, Souza Ferrão, Ernest Rebello, J. P. Souzalin, Andrew Fernandes, Saib Rocha, Miss Julie, Miss Carlota, Dioginho D'Mello, Minguel Rod, and Young Menezes. In addition to his work with Rod, Fernandes ventured into other productions, including Ernest Rebello's tiatr Avoicho Gutt (Mother's Secret), where he acted opposite Joao Bautist Lobo and Seby Coutinho in their debut Konkani stage performances. Fernandes played a supporting role in Konkani comedian Jacinto Vaz's tiatr Maim ani Sun (Mother and Daughter-in-law) on 21 February 1955. He also made appearances in tiatrs by playwright and singer J. A. Lobato.

== Personal life ==
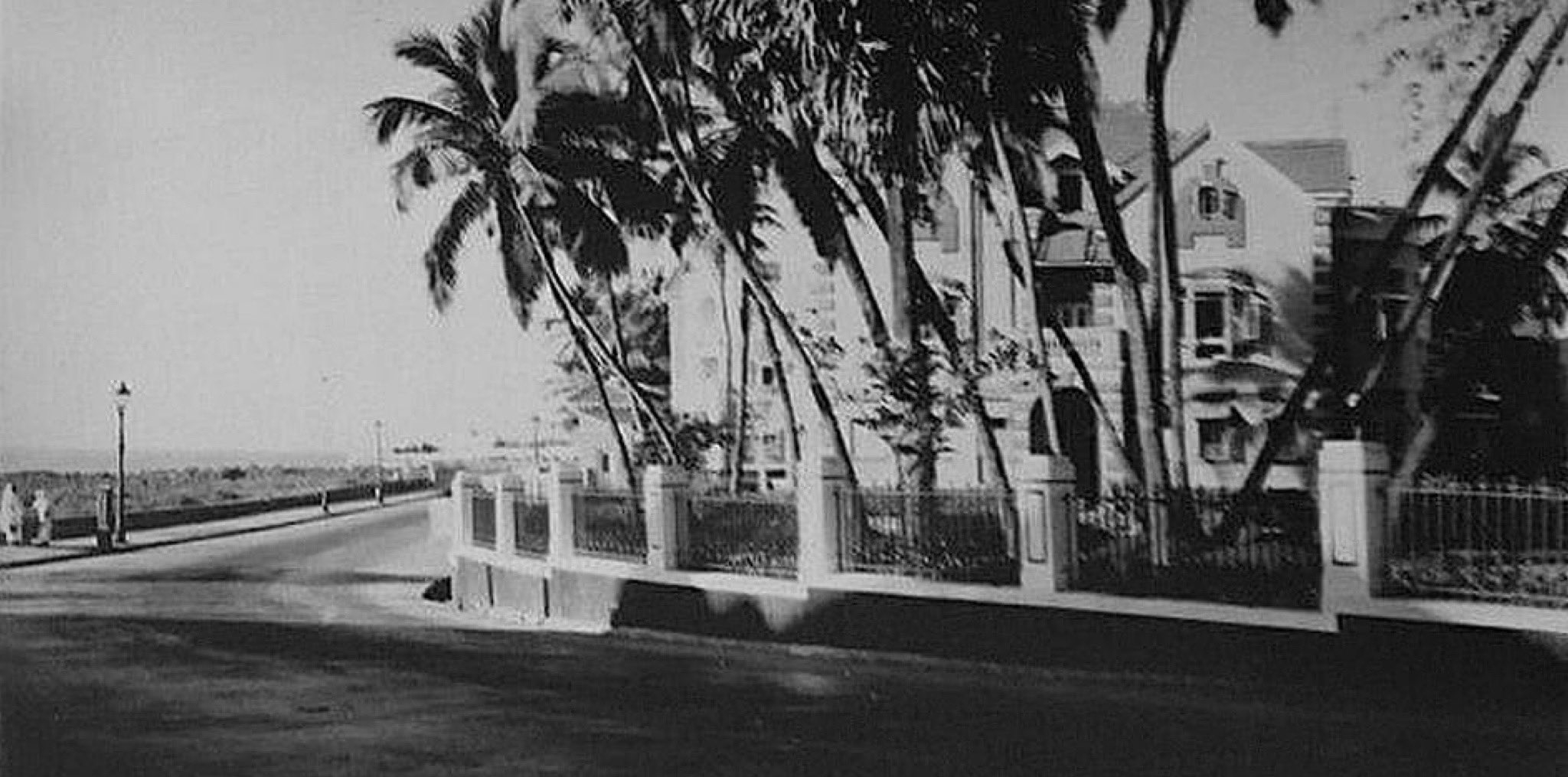
A turn at Warden Road, Bombay

There is limited personal information available about Fernandes's life. According to the book Tiatr 125th Commemorative Volume, Fernandes originally hailed from Bardez taluka, Goa, which was part of Portuguese India during the Portuguese Empire (now located in India). He supposedly relocated, possibly for better employment opportunities. Writer Fausto V. da Costa, one of the authors of the book, writes that Fernandes lived near Bhatia Hospital at Warden Road (now Breach Candy) in Bombay, which was then part of Bombay Presidency in British India. Da Costa also writes that Fernandes was a tailor by profession and not a full-time tiatrist or theatre performer. It is also likely that in Bombay, Fernandes began his career on the Konkani stage, though further information is not currently available.

== Selected stage works ==
Year	Title	Role	Notes	Ref
Before 1941	Untitled short play			
	Mhozo Nouro	Comedian		
Before 1953	Avoicho Gutt			
1955	Maim ani Sun	Supporting role		
