= Star of Arossim =

Indian singer and actor (1932–2016)

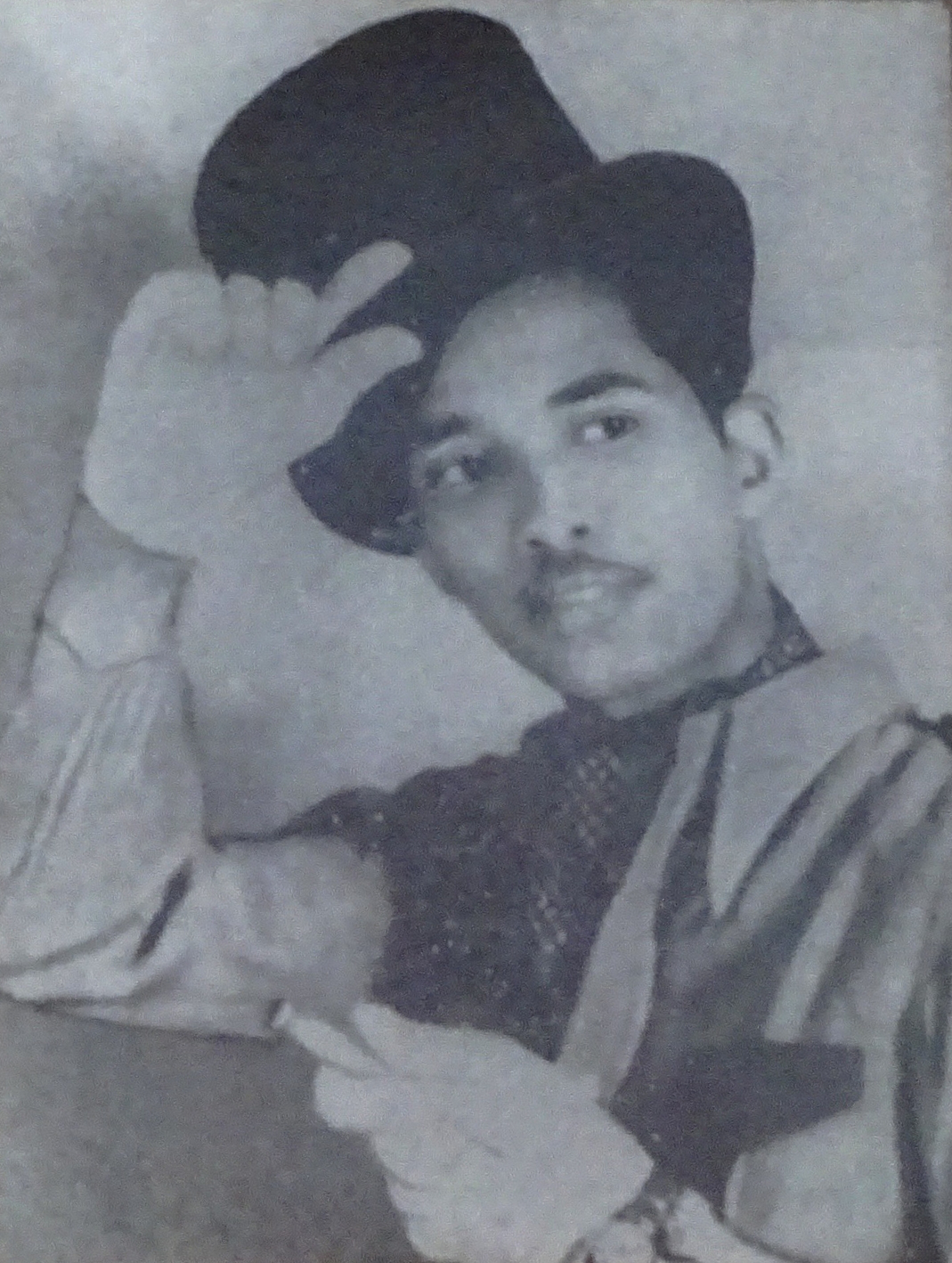
- Portrait of Antao during his youth
- Born: Alegre Roque Teodoro Antao; 11 September 1932; Marmagão, Goa, Portuguese India
- Died: 20 July 2016 (aged 83); St Estevam, Goa, India
- Burial place: St Stephen's Church cemetery, St Estevam, Goa, India
- Occupations: Singer; dramatist; theatre director; actor; composer
- Years active: 1963–2010
- Notable work: Amchem Noxib (1963)
- Spouse: Abelina Filomena Antao
- Children: 1
- Musical career
- Instruments: Vocals; Bongo; Conga
- Member of: Bomboikar Group
- Star of Arossim's Voice A song by Antao, played on the AIR FM Rainbow at Panjim, Goa.

Alegre Roque Teodoro Antao (Note: Alternatively spelt as Alegro Roque Theodorio Antao in some publications.) (11 September 1932 – 20 July 2016), known professionally as Star of Arossim, was an Indian singer, composer, dramatist, director, and actor who primarily worked on the Konkani stage. Regarded as a multifaceted artiste and one of the stalwarts of the Konkani stage. A skilled bongo and conga player, he is best known for being part of the Bomboikar Group for their biannual shows.

Antao, alongside C. Alvares, M. Boyer, Prem Kumar, Souza Ferrao, Remmie Colaco, Alfred Rose, and various others, held a deep reverence for the stage and made a conscious effort not to overstep its boundaries. Their timeless melodies have now become beloved classics among Goan musical groups.

== Early and personal life ==
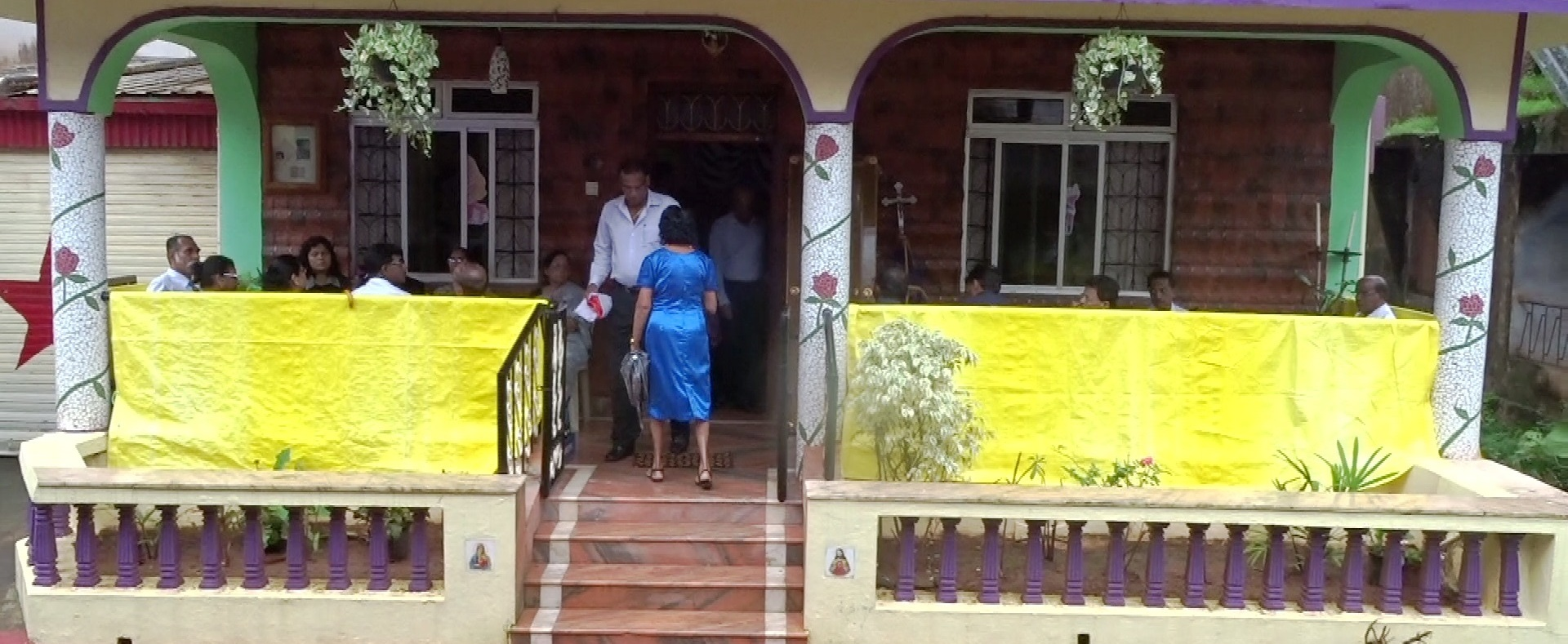
Antao's residence in St Estevam, Goa

Alegre Roque Teodoro Antao was born on 11 September 1932 in Marmagão, Goa, Portuguese India during the Portuguese Empire (now in India) to Piedade Lourenco Antao and Escociana Diniz. (Note: Antao's birthplace has been reported incorrectly in some publications. According to his official birth certificate, he was born in the city of Mormugao. However, the certificate itself was registered in the village of Majorda, which is 4.8 km (3.0 mi) away from the separate villages of Arossim and Cansaulim.) He hailed from Arossim-Cansaulim. Antao was married to Abelina Filomena, (Note: Abelina is also spelt as Avelina, according to O Heraldo.) the couple had one child, Savio.

== Career ==
Antao began his career in the performing arts as a female artist in the tiatr "Open to Close" by Minguel Rod. He later became one of the key members of the "Bomboikar Group," which entertained Goans twice a year with their highly anticipated tiatrs. Antao not only acted in tiatrs by Anthony Mendes, C. Alvares, Alfred Rose, and others, but he also wrote and directed his own tiatrs, including "Amcho Dusman," "Bacro Democracy," and "Retired Tarvotti."

In the early stages of his career, like many other male artists, Antao played female roles and sang the female parts in duets in tiatrs. Some of his notable songs include solos such as "Fulus-Sotte," and duets with Mohana, such as "Tambddem Bonder," "Xit Koddi," and "Nirmonn." Antao's voice can still be heard in popular songs like "Cheddeachem Baltim" with Alfred Rose and "Orrad Tarvotti" with Anthony Mendes.

Antao had an extensive body of work in the creative field. He had written and directed 15 tiatrs, and has appeared in numerous tiatrs as an actor. He has also contributed by composing lyrics for songs in Konkani films. Additionally, Antao has showcased his musical skills by playing the bongo and conga instruments for Hindi music. He has received recognition for his work, including several gramophone records.

== Awards ==
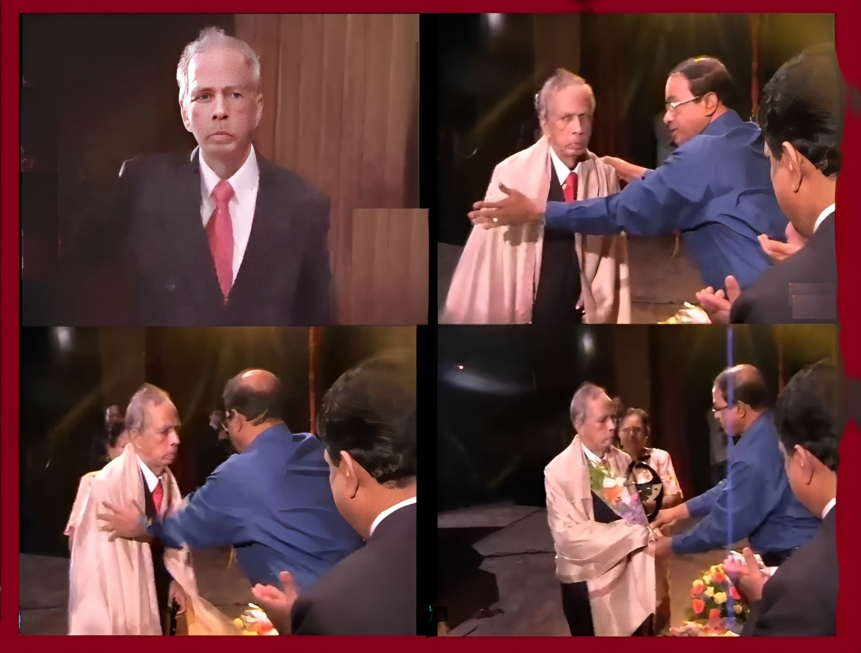
Antao receiving the Lifetime Contribution to Tiatr award by Tiatr Academy of Goa, 2010.

In the year 2000–2001, Antao was honored for his significant contributions to the tiatr field, being awarded the esteemed Goa State Cultural Award as recognition of his outstanding work.

On 14 December 2010, Antao's lifelong dedication to tiatr was celebrated and acknowledged by the Tiatr Academy of Goa. He received the esteemed 'Lifetime Contribution to Tiatr' award during a special ceremony held at the Pai Tiatrist Auditorium, Ravindra Bhavan in Margao. The award was presented by Digambar Kamat, the Chief Minister of Goa at the time.

== Death ==
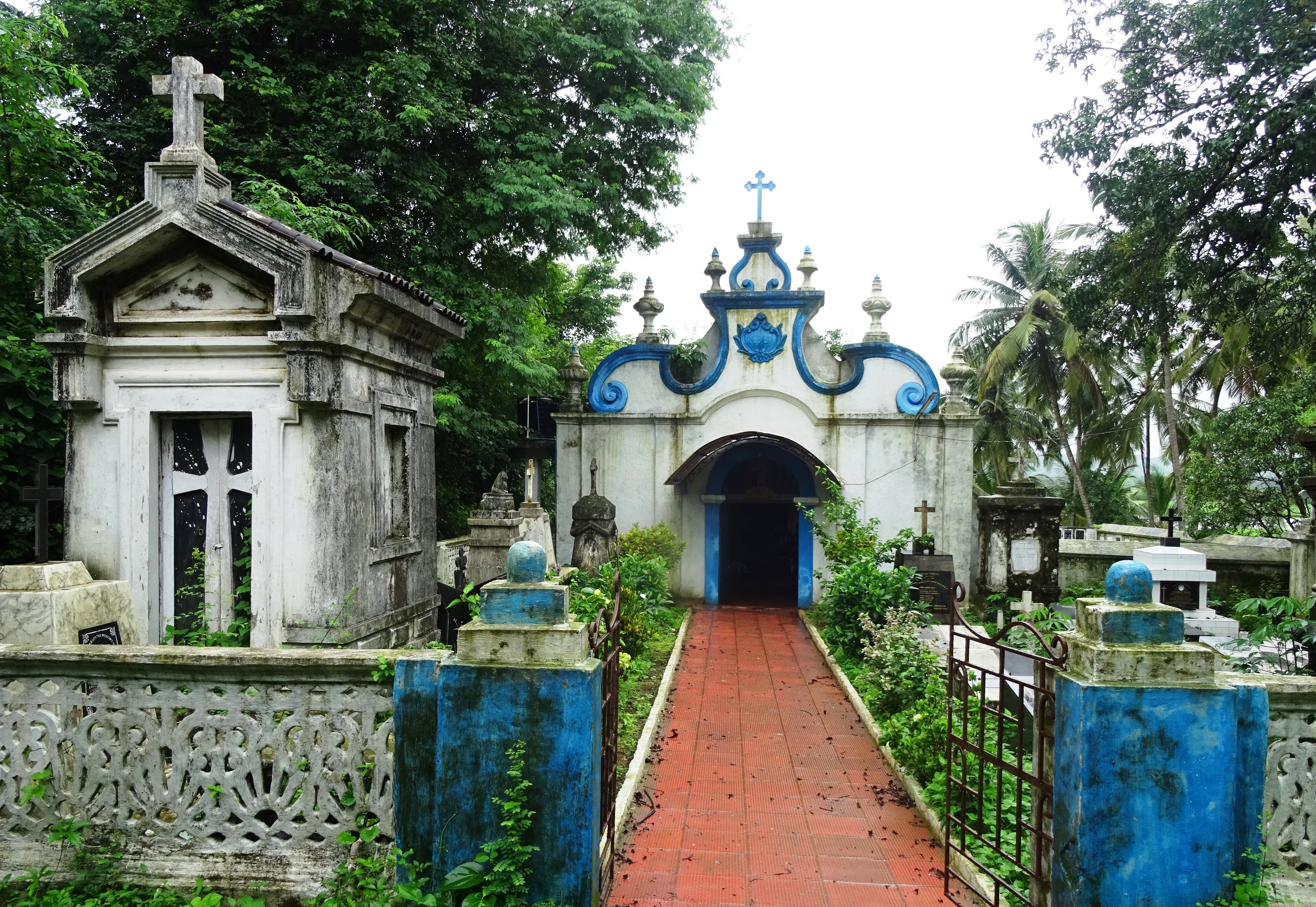
St. Stephen's Church cemetery, where Antao was laid to rest.

On 20 July 2016, Antao died at his residence in St Estevam, Goa, aged 83. Hilary Braganza, who hails from Arossim, has been continuing his uncle's legacy. The Tiatr Academy of Goa expressed deep sadness and offered sincere condolences to the grieving family upon hearing of his passing.

== Legacy ==
In January 2017, the 22nd edition of the Goa Yuva Mahotsav took place at Government College, and Ravindra Bhavan in Sanquelim, Goa. As part of this two-day event, a special dedication was made to honor Antao by naming a new stage after him.

On 6 August 2017, during the fourth edition of Goencho Avaz organized by the Herald Group, a singing competition took place at Ravindra Bhavan in Margao. Two singers from Cortalim, Noywen Fernandes and Thrizel D'Souza, captivated the audience with their rendition of the popular song "Yo Moga Tum Mhojea Sukha." This song, originally performed by Martha, Molly, Antao, and Remmie Colaco in 1963, earned the duo a third place in the competition.

On 30 September 2019, the Tiatr Academy of Goa (TAG) organized a special program called 'Somplolea Tiatristancho Ugddas' at the Black Box, Ravindra Bhavan in Margao. During this event, the focus was on celebrating the lives and contributions of talented artists who were born in the month of September. The program served as a tribute to these late artists, namely Antao, Khadda Minguel, Seby Coutinho, Prem Kumar, Peter D'Costa, Philomena Braz, Remmie Colaço, Rosalia Rodrigues, Inacio Rosario Luis (Jal), and Arnaldo Da Costa.

== Filmography ==
| Year | Title | Role | Notes |
|---|---|---|---|
| 1963 | Amchem Noxib | Actor/Singer | |
| 1967 | Sukhachem Sopon | Composer | |

== Selected stage works ==
| Year | Title | Role | Notes |
|---|---|---|---|
| | Open to Close | Female Artist | Debut Tiatr |
| | Tarvachi Viaj | Writer | |
| | Ganv Bhav | Writer | |
| | Fulgoddem | Writer | |
| | Xetkamti | Writer | |
| | Dorji Camil | Writer | |
| | Kuddmi Onton | Writer | |
| | Retired Tarvotti | Writer/Director | |
| | Amcho Dusman | Writer/Director | |
| | Bailancho Parliament | Writer | |
| | Korunk Na Tem | Writer | |
| | Asson Duddu Sonvsar Koddu | Writer | |
| | Bacro Democracy | Writer/Director | |
