= Philomena Braz =

Indian actress and singer (1933–2011)

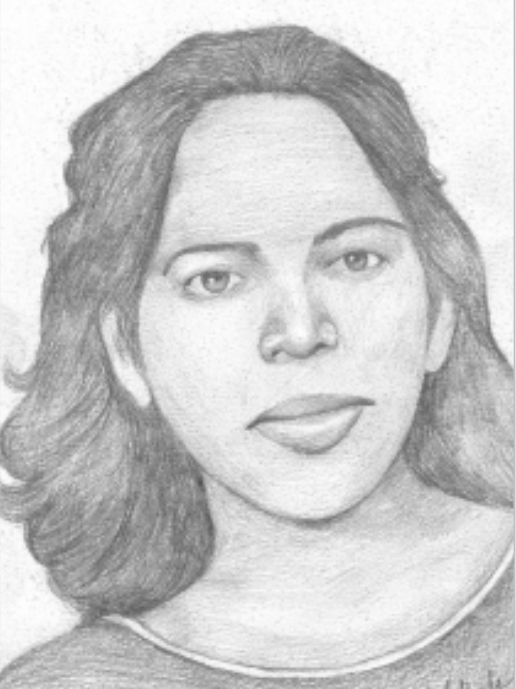
- Portrait of Braz
- Born: Filomena Piedade Bras; 24 September 1933; Bombay, Bombay Presidency, British India (now Mumbai, Maharashtra, India)
- Died: 15 February 2011 (aged 77); Margao, Goa, India
- Other names: Philomina Crasto; Philomena Piedade Crasto
- Occupations: Actress; singer
- Years active: 1963–2000s
- Notable work: Amchem Noxib (1963)
- Spouse: Bernabe Crasto
- Children: 1

Philomena Braz e Crasto (born Filomena Piedade Bras; 24 September 1933 – 15 February 2011) was an Indian actress, and singer known for her work in Konkani films and tiatr productions from 1963 to the 2000s.

== Career ==
Braz was a character actress known for her contributions to the Konkani stage. Her career began in 1963 with her appearance in Alfred Rose's production of Zotkaxi Dorji. Throughout her career, she collaborated with a multitude of directors and playwrights, including Saib Rocha, J. P. Souzalin, Kid Boxer, Prem Kumar, Jacint Vaz, C. Alvares, Dod de Verna, Nelson Affonso, Kamat de Assolna, Minguel Rod, M. Boyer, and Remmie Colaco.

One of Braz's standout performances was in Prem Kumar's tiatr, Odhi Bakri. However, her most memorable portrayals were in the works of C. Alvares, particularly in the tiatrs Axea (Greed) and Khuincho Mandament (Which Sacrament?), where she displayed her talent alongside an all-female cast. Braz's versatility as an actress allowed her to shine in various roles, encompassing comedy, elderly characters, and the dynamic relationships of mother-in-law and daughter-in-law. Beyond her acting prowess, she was also a singer, delivering solo, duet, trio, and quartet performances on stage. She showcased her singing talents alongside artists such as Anthony Mendes, C. Alvares, Alfred Rose, and Star of Arossim.

Braz' performances were not confined to live shows; she also recorded her songs for platforms such as His Master's Voice and All India Radio. Additionally, her voice graced numerous audio cassettes. While Braz did not write her own tiatrs, she ventured into directing with Axechi Doxea, a production penned by Anthony Fernandes of Vakola, Bombay. The tiatr garnered acclaim, receiving numerous stage performances throughout Bombay. Braz's talent transcended geographical boundaries as she also traveled to various Gulf countries to showcase her tiatr performances abroad.

== Personal life ==
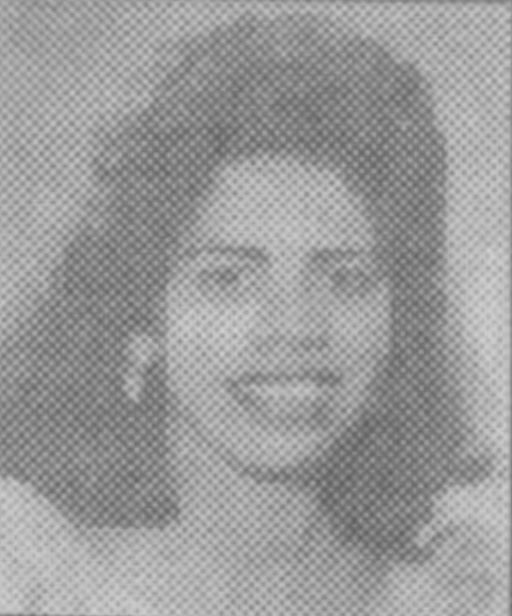
Braz during her youth

Filomena Piedade Bras originally hailed from Bombay (now Mumbai). She entered into a marital union with Bernabe Caitano Do Rosario Inacio Crasto and together they had a daughter named Candida "Candy" Crasto (b. 1974) in Bombay and later married seafarer Dennis Rebello, who was employed on the MV Queen of the Oceans. According to the book titled 100 Years of Konkani Tiatro, published in 2000, Braz is mentioned as hailing from Orlim, Salcete, while also having a residence with her family at Dockyard Road, Mazagon, Bombay.

On 15 February 2011, Braz died at the Grace Intensive Cardiac Hospital in Margao, Goa.

== Filmography ==
Year	Title	Role	Notes	Ref
1963	Amchem Noxib			

== Selected stage works ==
Year	Title	Role	Notes	Ref
1963	Zotkaxi Dorji		Debut tiatr	
	Odhi Bakri			
	Axea			
	Khuincho Mandament		All-female cast	
1978	Axechi Doxea	Director		
