= Anthony Mendes =

Indian actor and comedian (1920–1964)

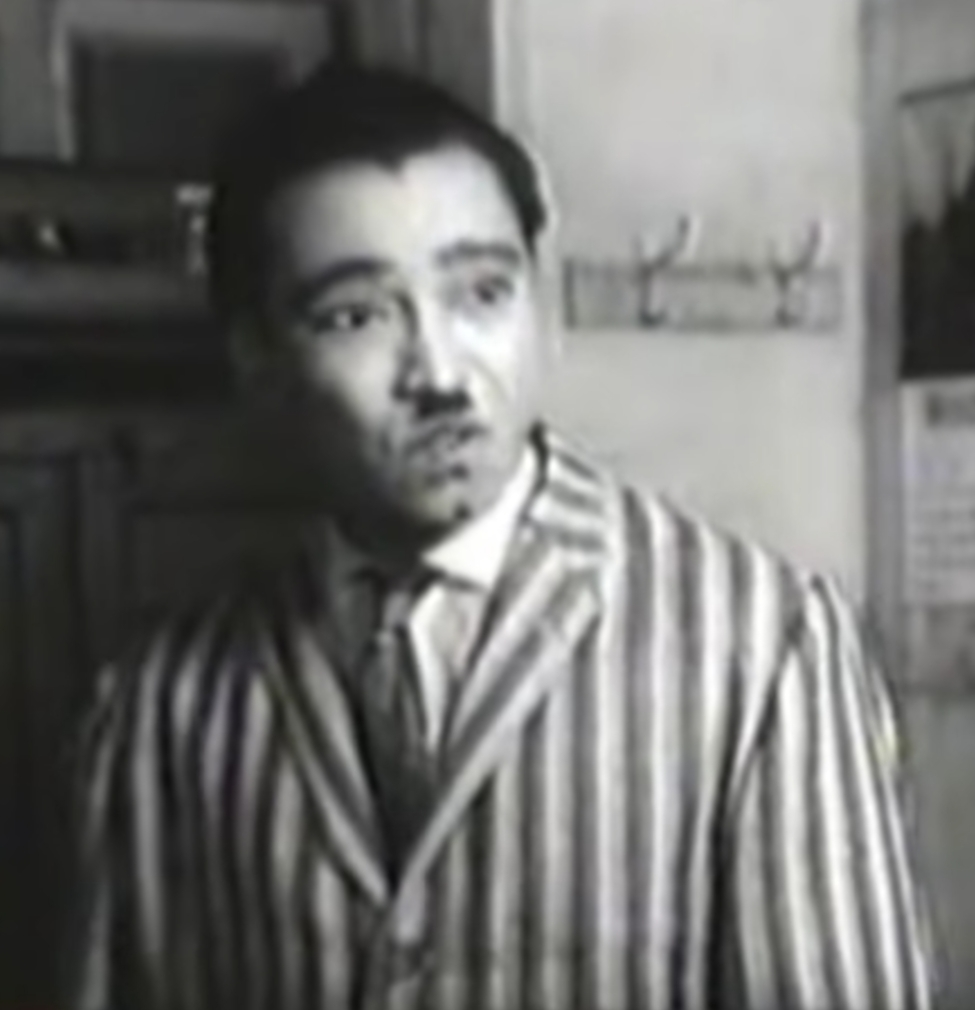
- Mendes as Valente in Amchem Noxib (1963)
- Born: Antonio Mendes; 28 December 1920; Borda, Goa, Portuguese India, Portuguese Empire (now in India)
- Died: 21 March 1964 (aged 43); Goa, India
- Education: St. Teresa's High School, Charni Road
- Occupations: Actor; comedian; singer; composer; lyricist; playwright
- Years active: 1936–1964
- Notable work: Amchem Noxib (1966)
- Spouse: Clementina Alvares (m. 1948)
- Children: 5

Anthony Mendes (born Antonio Mendes; 28 December 1920 – 21 March 1964) was an Indian actor, comedian, singer, composer, lyricist, and playwright known for his work in Konkani films and tiatr productions.

== Early life ==
Anthony Mendes, was born as Antonio Mendes, on 28 December 1920, in Borda, Goa, which was part of Portuguese India during the Portuguese Empire. Born into a Goan Catholic family to parents Felicio Santana Mendes and Filomena Mendes, Mendes grew up in the parish of Verna, Goa. From an early age, Mendes exhibited talent in the fields of singing and acting. Writer and historian Wilson Mazarello attests to Mendes' innate abilities in these artistic pursuits. Mendes' passion for singing and acting was evident as he organized concerts, gathering young boys from his village to participate in these performances. Mendes received his education at St. Theresa's High School in Girgaum, Bombay. It was during his time at this institution that his talent truly flourished. Mendes actively participated in numerous concerts, impressing his teachers and peers with his skills. Beyond his school years, Mendes continued to make contributions to the Goan music scene. During school holidays, he actively participated in Goan concerts.

== Career ==
During his tenure in Bombay, Mendes seized an opportunity to partake in Goan concerts, which served as a stepping stone for his theatrical career. It was during one such concert that he caught the eye of João Agostinho Fernandes, who extended an invitation for Mendes to join the cast of his theatrical farce titled Mhozo Khapri Chakor (My African Servant). This farce debuted in 1936 at the Antonio D'Souza School Hall in Dadar, Bombay. Impressed by Mendes's performance, João Agostinho subsequently cast him in all of his tiatrs (Goan musical theatre), including the theatrical production Vauraddi (The Labourer), where Mendes portrayed a vhoddekar (boatman). Vauraddi premiered at the Princess Theatre in Bhangwadi, Bombay, marking Mendes's debut on this particular stage. His participation in hundreds of tiatrs ensued thereafter. Mendes made his inaugural trip from Margão to Bombay using a horse-drawn carriage. Upon arriving at the Carwar border, he was discovered and subsequently transported to Bombay without any recourse or alternative available.

Mendes quickly became a popular choice among those who enjoyed attending tiatr performances, owing to his voice, melodious singing, and impeccable characterizations, writes Konkani historian and writer Wilson Mazarello. His renditions of popular songs such as "Taxi," "Dadlo Bail," "Magnese Firoi," "Tarvotti Nouro," "Zor Normal Zalo," "Kamparika Banja," and "Wonderful Child" continue to resonate, with the popularity of "Kamparika Banja" meriting regular airtime on All India Radio, Panjim. Mendes received acclaim for his comedic performance in the film Amchem Noxib, with his memorable songs, including the timeless "Bencdaita Pai," contributing to its legacy in the Konkani movie industry. Additionally, Mendes showcased his talents as a composer and singer, producing several chart-topping tracks, including those featured in the film Amchem Noxib. His musical prowess also found expression through recordings for Gramophone Company India. Beyond his artistic pursuits, Mendes maintained employment with Brilliant Batteries Services in Grant Road, Bombay, and was known for his disciplined approach as a performer. Esteemed by his stage colleagues, Mendes's punctuality was exemplified by his consistent presence at the venue an hour before each show.

Throughout his career spanning 28 years, Mendes made contributions as an actor, playwright, and comedian. His performances were known for their natural comedic brilliance, characterized by his timing, physicality, and sense of humor. Mendes had an uncanny ability to elicit laughter from the audience with his mere presence on stage. Even before uttering a single word, his comical body movements, expressive eyes, and agile demeanor would ignite laughter throughout the entire theater. Once he spoke, his delivery was so hilarious that audiences found it impossible to contain their laughter. Mendes possessed a rare talent for bringing joy and mirth to the hearts of people, often leaving them with literal stomach pains from excessive laughter, writes Mazarello. In addition to his skills as an actor, Mendes was a playwright. He wrote his first script during his school days, and his creative output eventually included 15 full-length tiatrs.

Several of his productions achieved success in terms of box office revenue, with Road to Mapusa standing out as one of his most notable hits. Among his works were Pandu Barber, Artimez, Goenkar (Goan), Boborji vo Kuzner, Pensaum vo Tensaum, Kunnbi Irmāu (Kunbi Brother), Dusreponni Cazar (Second Marriage), Ticli Sun, Voniecho Jurament, Editorachem Noxib (Editor's Luck), Guirannacho Put, Bekar Zanvoim (Unemployed Son-in-law), and the popular Road to Mapusa. In the year 1940, he authored, directed, and presented the play Pandu Barber, debuting in Goa and subsequently in Bombay at the Princess Theatre Bhangwadi. Mendes's influence extended beyond the stage. He embarked on numerous tours, performing at tiatrs in Bombay, Goa, Poona, Ahmedabad, and even East Africa. Mendes died at the age of 43 in 1964. However, his legacy continued through his sons, known professionally as the Mendes Brothers. They inherited their father's artistic prowess and completed his last Konkani tiatr, Bomboicho Dada (Bombay's Father), which became an instant sensation. The Mendes Brothers' performances were met with success, drawing full houses. A particular highlight of their repertoire was the popular song "Amchi Maim," dedicated to their mother Clementina, who single-handedly raised their five children following the loss of their father, Mendes.

== Personal life ==
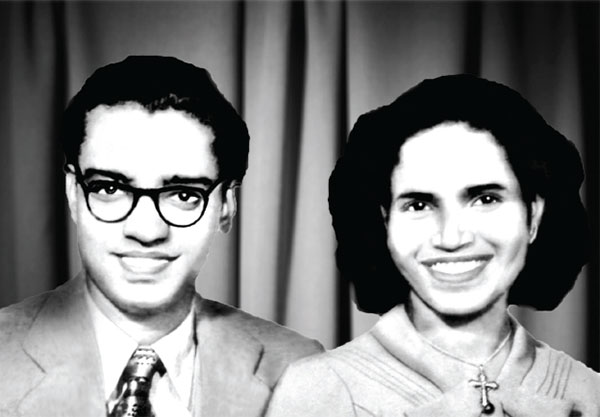
Mendes and his wife Clementina

In 1948, Mendes entered into matrimony with Clementina Mendes (née Alvares), a homemaker originating from Raia, Goa. The couple had two daughters, Theresa and Amelia, and three sons, Felix, Xavier, and Derrick. Mendes's three sons later formed a musical trio known as the Mendes Brothers, specializing in performances in the Konkani language. Known for his devotion as a husband and father, Mendes consistently placed his family's needs at the forefront, ensuring their welfare and support. Despite his involvement in the entertainment industry, Mendes encouraged his children to explore alternative avenues of income rather than pursuing acting careers. However, their exposure to their father's stage shows (tiatrs) sparked their interest in the Konkani stage, ultimately drawing them towards artistic pursuits. Continuing the family's musical legacy, Mendes's grandson, Chris, emerged as a music composer, lyricist, singer, and performer. Marking Mendes's remarkable 100th birth anniversary celebration, Chris paid homage to his grandfather by recreating and delivering a rendition of the song "Mogachem Tarum" from the Konkani film Amchem Noxib. This special rendition featured the participation of Remo Fernandes, a dedicated admirer of Mendes, who enthusiastically embraced the opportunity to collaborate with Chris on this tribute.

== Artistry ==
Konkani writer and singer Wilson Mazarello, describes Mendes as a prolific composer and singer who performed a diverse range of songs on stage, including both humorous and serious solos, as well as duets and trios. He was known for his distinctive presentation style, particularly when performing comedic songs. His physical flexibility and animated body language earned him the nickname "Spring Man," and his ability to roll his eyes and deliver witty humor in his comedic performances endeared him to audiences, often eliciting hearty laughter.

== Death ==
On 21 March 1964, Mendes died in Goa at the age of 43 from complications related to blood cancer. His demise prompted the tiatr fraternity in Bombay to unite in remembrance of his contributions. As a tribute, they organized a series of performances of Mendes' popular drama, Guirannach Put, under the direction of C. Alvares. These heartfelt renditions took place at venues such as Princess Theatre Bhangwadi, Bombay, St. Mary's Hall in Mazagaon, Damodar Hall in Parel, St. Michael's in Mahim, and St. Peter's Hall in Bandra. One highlight of these presentations was Alfred Rose's emotionally charged rendition of the song "Konkani Palk Golloita Dukam," dedicated to Mendes, which moved audiences to tears. Mendes' artistic legacy lives on through his sons, Felix-Xavier-Derrick, known collectively as the Mendes Brothers, who continue to uphold their father's artistic heritage.
