= Joseph Haydn Kammerphilharmonie =

Joseph Haydn Kammerphilharmonie is an international chamber orchestra consisting of 20 young musicians. It was founded in 2011 by Andrzej Berezynski, Pawel Zuzanski and Heinz Kroczek. The orchestra's conductor and artistic leader is Andrzej Berezynski. The orchestra concentrates on classical and romantic repertoire and gives several concerts a year.
