= Rita Lobo =

Indian actress and singer (born 1944)

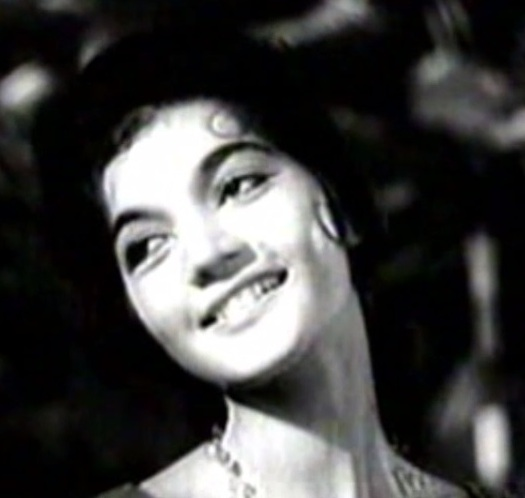
- Landers as Flavia in Amchem Noxib (1963)
- Born: 2 January 1944 (age 82); Mangalore, Madras Presidency, British India
- Occupations: Actress; singer
- Known for: Amchem Noxib (1963)
- Spouse: Melville Landers
- Children: 4
- Awards: TAG's "Lifetime Contribution to Konkani Cinema Award" (2015)
- Website: facebook.com/rita.landers.1

Rita Landers (née Lobo; born 2 January 1944) is an Indian former actress and singer, best known for her debut leading role in the Konkani film Amchem Noxib (1963). Having been discovered by filmmaker Frank Fernand and film director A. Salaam while singing at a restaurant, she was chosen for the lead role after impressing them with her performance. She received Lifetime Contribution to Konkani Cinema Award for her role in the film, her only acting credit before leaving the film industry.

== Career ==
Landing her first role in the Konkani film industry at the age of 17, Landers made her debut in the film Amchem Noxib in 1963, although the film was not released until two years later. Initially hesitant to accept the offer due to her unfamiliarity with the Goan Konkani dialect, which differed from her native language spoken in Mangalore, she was persuaded by the film's producer, Frank Fernand, and director, A. Salaam. Salaam personally taught her the language in order to effectively perform her scenes. Amchem Noxib remains the sole film in which Landers has acted, despite being introduced to Bollywood actor and director Raj Kapoor by Konkani comedian Anthony Mendes. Kapoor had encouraged her to learn Hindi and reach out to him, but she did not pursue the opportunity.

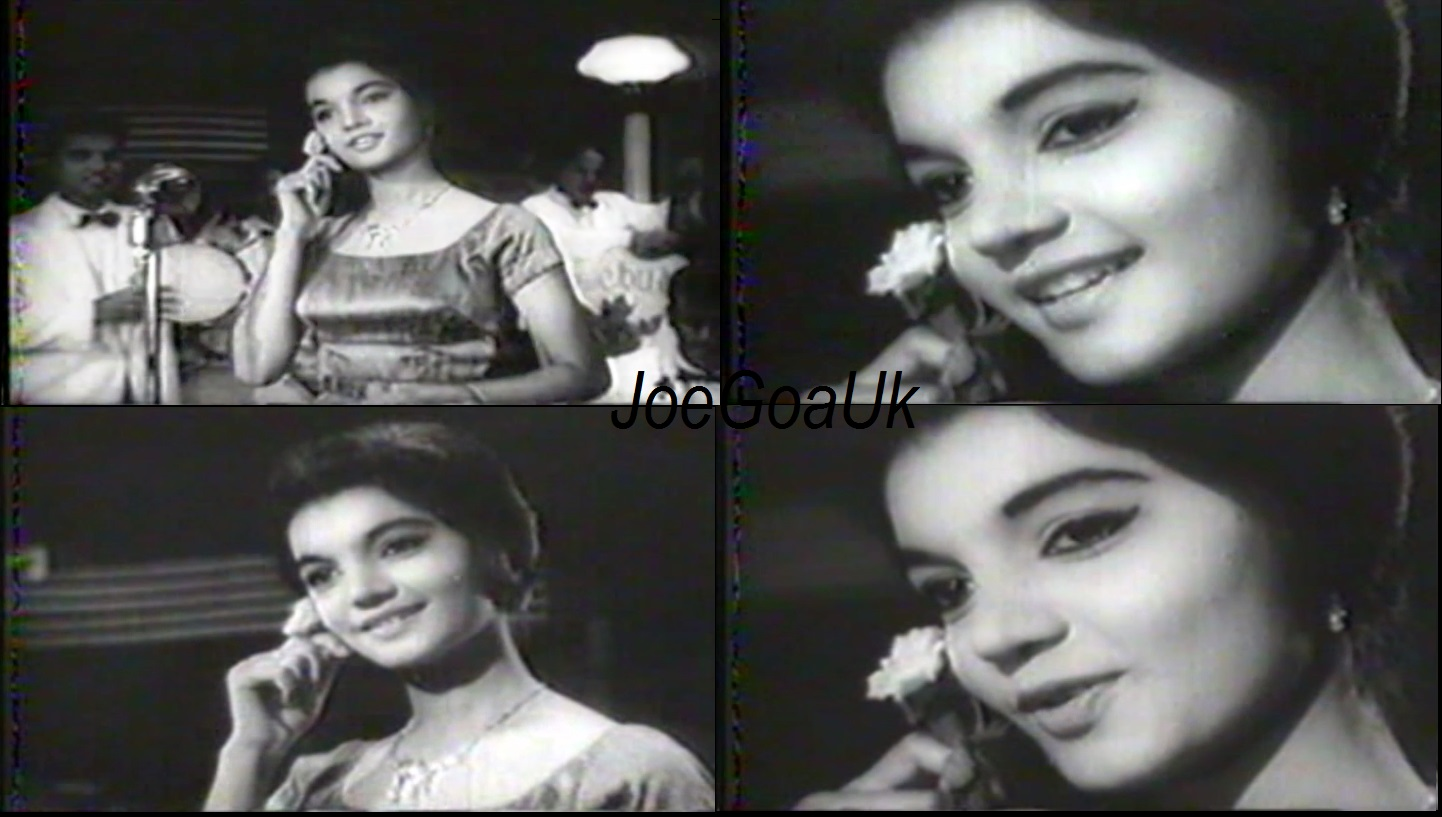
Landers' collage from Amchem Noxib

Landers stood in her decision to decline subsequent film offers, noting her already established reputation as a singer when she was discovered by the producer and director of Amchem Noxib during a performance at Bombay's Ali Baba restaurant. Impressed by her talent, they promptly offered her the leading role in the film after their previous attempts to find a suitable actress through newspaper advertisements and auditions proved fruitless. Recalling her first day on the set of Amchem Noxib, Landers vividly remembers an emotional scene in which she was required to cry. The entire day was dedicated to capturing this particular love scene, causing the director, Salaam, to become frustrated and reprimand her for her inability to summon tears. While the boat scene was filmed in Borivali, Bombay, the remaining portions of the movie were shot in Goa. Despite the success of Amchem Noxib, Landers declined numerous subsequent film offers. Viewers who watched the film lauded her performance and complimented her appearance, some even extending invitations to their homes. In response, Landers acknowledged the passage of time, stating that her appearance had naturally changed with age.

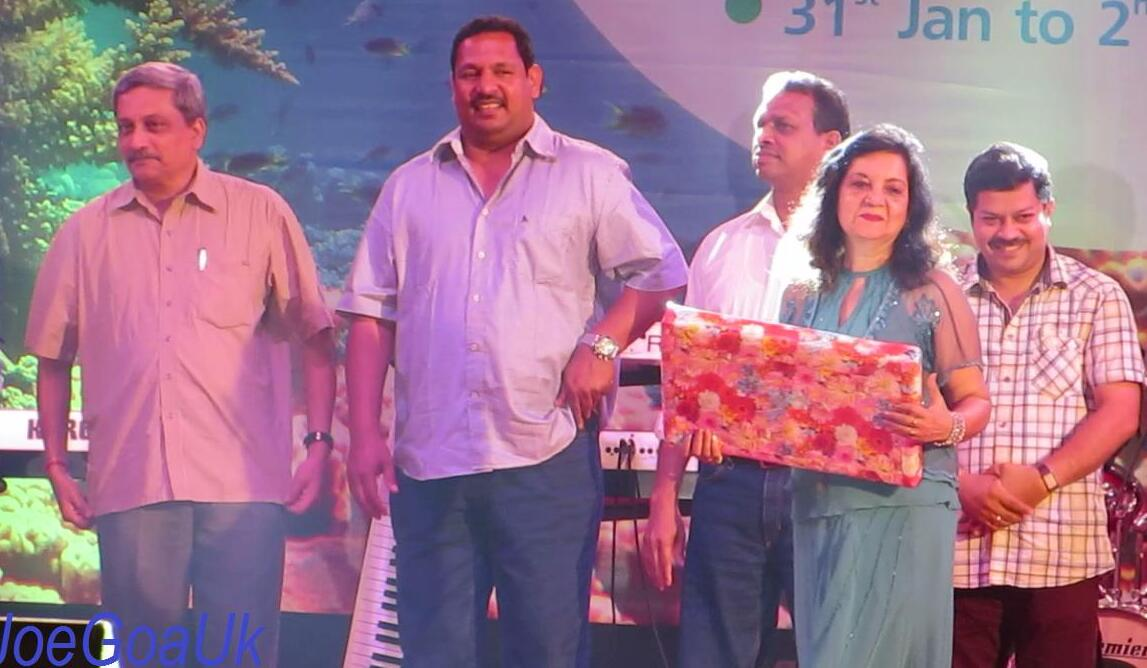
Landers (right) at the show organised by the fisheries department in 2014

In 2014, Landers was invited by the fisheries department to perform at a show held in Navelim, Goa. During the 2015 Konkani Cinema Day, she expressed her gratitude for the love and appreciation she received for her portrayal in Amchem Noxib by singing a few lines from a traditional Goan mando.

== Personal life ==
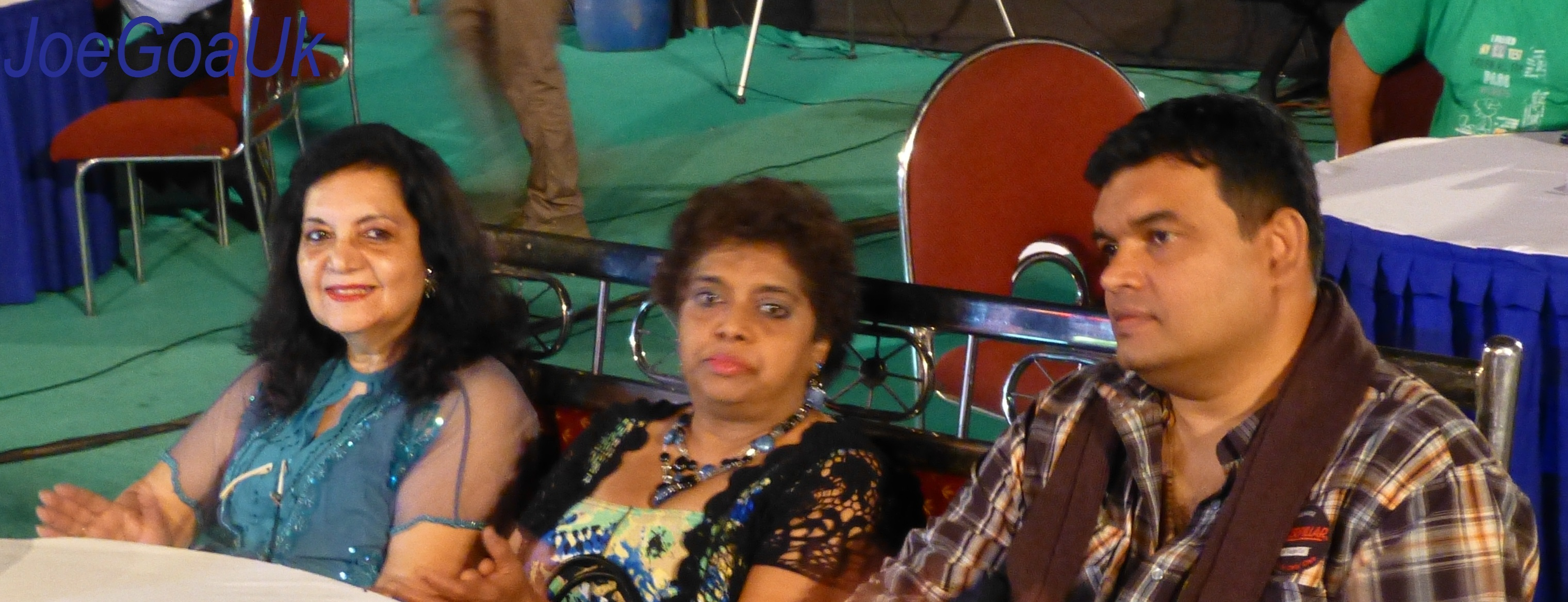
Landers (left) along with her cousin (middle), and son Clint (right), 2014

Rita Landers, originally known as Rita Lobo, was born on 2 January 1944, in Mangalore, which was part of the Madras Presidency in British India (now located in Karnataka, India). Her parents were John Lobo from the area of Thottam, Udupi district, and Marceline Lobo from the panchayat town of Mulki. Landers is currently married to Melville Landers and has three sons named Clint, Dan, and Dax, as well as a daughter named Claudelle. As of April 2015, she resides in the suburb of Andheri, located in Mumbai.

== Awards ==
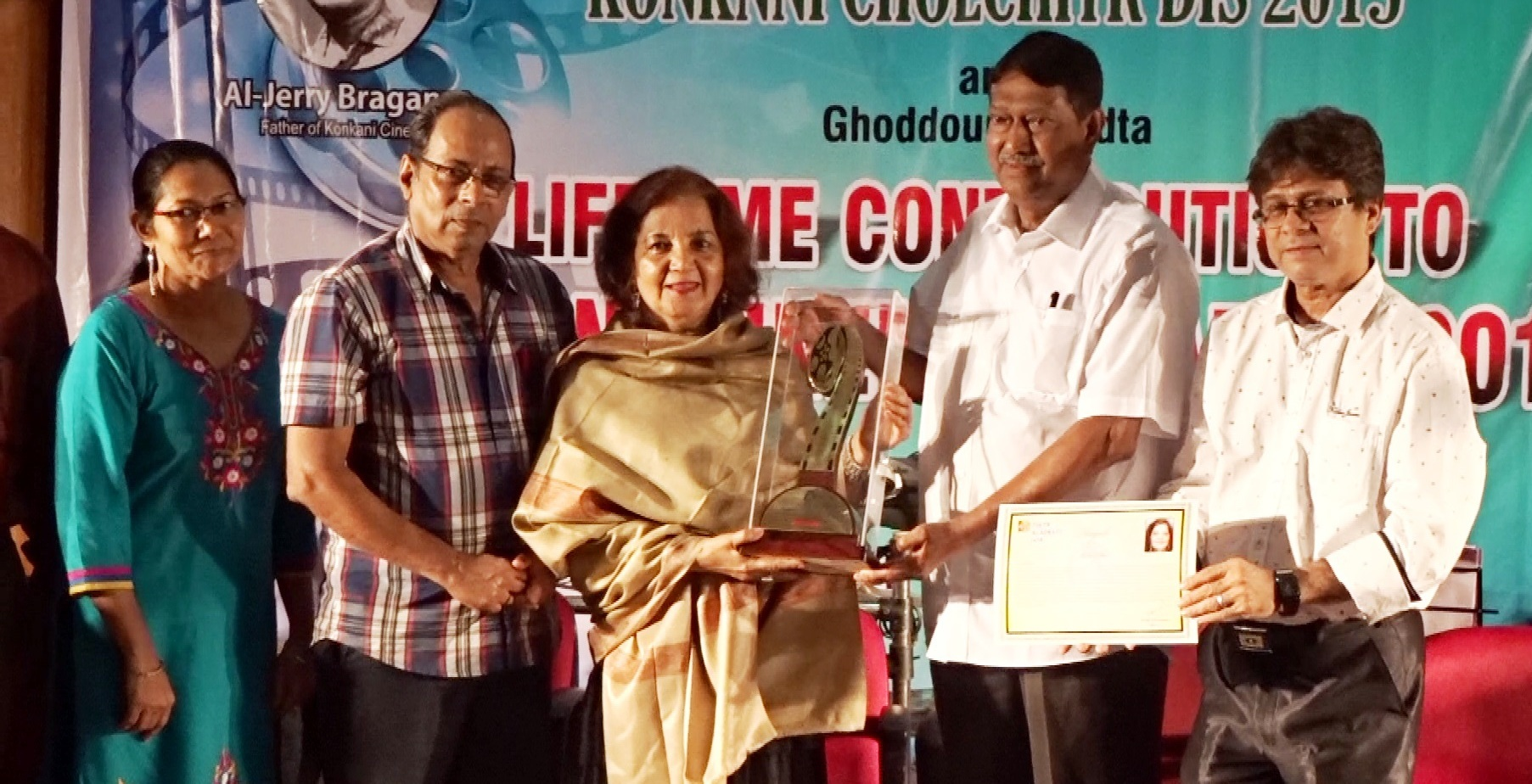
Landers receiving the award, 2015

On 24 April 2015, Landers received the "Lifetime Contribution to Konkani Cinema Award" from the Tiatr Academy of Goa (TAG) in recognition of her significant contributions to Konkani cinema. The award ceremony took place at Ravindra Bhavan in Margao and was attended by fellow filmmaker Richard Castelino from Mangalore.

== Filmography ==
Year	Title	Role	Notes	Ref
1963	Amchem Noxib	Flavia	Professional debut	
