= Jacinto Vaz =

Indian comedian and singer (1918–1993)

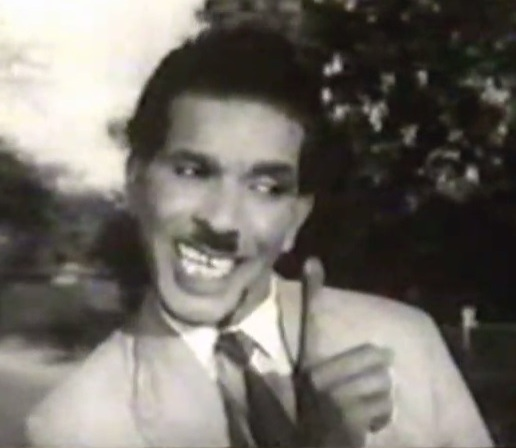
- Vaz as Paltu in Nirmon (1966)
- Born: Jacinto Castor Vas; 27 April 1918; Mandur, Goa, Portuguese India, Portuguese Empire (now in India)
- Died: 30 April 1993 (aged 75); Mandur, Goa, India
- Other names: Jacint Vaz
- Occupations: Comedian; actor; singer; composer; playwright
- Employer: Emissora de Goa
- Notable work: Nirmon (1966)
- Spouse: Mary Vaz (m. 1947)
- Children: 2

Jacinto Castor Vaz (Goan Konkani: Jacint; né Vas; 27 April 1918 – 30 April 1993) was an Indian comedian, actor, singer, composer, and playwright known for his work in Konkani films and tiatr productions. Referred to as the "Charlie Chaplin of the Konkani stage," he was a leading comedian during the golden phase of tiatr, and has acted in over 4000 tiatrs.

== Early life ==
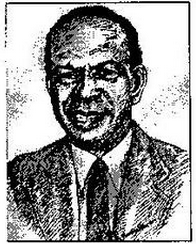
Vaz in his middle age

Jacinto Castor Vaz, originally known as Jacinto Castor Vas, was born on 27 April 1918, in Mandur, Ilhas de Goa, which was a part of Portuguese India during the Portuguese Empire and is presently located in India. His parents were Castor Joaquin Vaz (né Vas) and Margarida Cardoso. Vaz received his elementary education at a local village school. During his schooling in Bombay (now Mumbai), Vaz, similar to many other Goan tiatrists, was introduced to the Konkani stage. He attended Little Flower High School, which organized annual Konkani singing competitions. Vaz's singing abilities attracted attention, leading to his regular participation in concerts and cultural events organized by the school. He was also recognized with awards for his acting and singing during these competitions. Vaz's growing reputation for his performances in school programs caught the attention of influential tiatr directors of the time. This served as a catalyst for his entry into the professional world of Konkani theater, where he would make a name for himself.

== Career ==
Vaz's introduction to the professional stage occurred in Ernest Rebello's tiatr production titled Hanv Patki (I Confess). Recognizing Vaz's talent, Dioguinho D'Mello invited him to join the National Artistes Unity in Bombay, an association that included figures such as Anthony Vaz, Souza Ferrão, Kid Boxer, and Miss Julie, all prominent tiatrists. Through this association, Vaz had the opportunity to tour Goa. Initially, Vaz focused on serious roles, predominantly singing melancholic songs. However, it was the playwright and director Alexinho de Candolim who identified Vaz's hidden comedic talent. Alexinho offered Vaz the lead role of a comical bridegroom in his tiatr production Bhasailolo Nouro (Destined Boyfriend). Vaz's performance surpassed expectations, establishing him as a comedian on the tiatr stage. Writer Irene Cardozo commended Vaz for his natural comedic ability, effortlessly blending with his role and captivating audiences with his spontaneous and effortless humor. Vaz's mere presence on stage evoked laughter, highlighting his innate comedic aptitude, writes Cardozo. Consequently, Vaz became synonymous with comedy, and subsequent offers predominantly comprised comedic roles.

During this period, Anthony Mendes held the position of the leading comedy figure in Konkani stage productions. However, Vaz's ascent was facilitated by an unfortunate event-the untimely death of Mendes in 1964 at the age of 43. Cardozo writes, this created a void that only a comedian of Vaz's caliber could fill. Vaz rose to the occasion, meeting the high expectations set by prominent directors. His contributions to the Konkani stage earned him the title "Charlie Chaplin" of the Konkani stage, writes Konkani historian and singer Wilson Mazarello. Vaz elevated comedy in Konkani tiatr to new heights, captivating a broad audience base. His popularity was such that tiatr attendees would inquire about his involvement in productions, often requesting tickets for the entire family. In addition to his accomplishments as a performer, Vaz was known as a playwright. He penned numerous tiatrs, some of which achieved significant commercial success. Among his popular works are Bodmas (Ungrateful), Gorvali (Housewife), Bandwala (Bands Man), Main ani Sun (Mother and Daughter-in-law), Nitidar (The Judge), Botler Bab, Xevott Putancho (Sons End), Mouza (Enjoyment), Tiatrist (Theatre performer), Dadagiri (Goondaism), Cunhead ani Mana, Amcheo Bailo (Our Women), Podon (Godfather), Ghovachem Ghor (Husband's Home), New Fashion, Bombay Dekho (See Bombay), To Aamkam Visorlo (He Forgot Us), and Mog Montur (Strong Love). One of Vaz's most acclaimed tiatrs, Cunhead ani Mana, enjoyed an extensive run of 175 performances. Vaz also took Cunhead ani Mana and New Fashion on a tour of African countries.

In 1959, Vaz embarked on a tour of various regions in Africa, where he showcased his tiatrs, a form of Goan musical theater. His performances took place in Nairobi, Mombasa, Dar-Es-Salaam, and Tanganyika Territory. Accompanying Vaz on this African tour were artists such as M. Dod de Verna, Saluzinho D'Costa, Remmie Colaco, Aristides Dias, A. S. Conception, Jephsis Hitler, Zacharias Fernandes, Dioginho D'Mello, and Young Menezes. Prior to reaching Africa, Vaz also staged Cunhead Ani Mana in Karachi, Pakistan. In 1982, Vaz embarked on a second tour of Africa. Starting from 1981, Vaz expanded his performances to encompass Gulf countries like Bahrain, Kuwait, Muscat, Doha, Dubai, and Abu Dhabi, where he entertained Goan audiences with his tiatrs. His songs, recorded with Gramophone Company India, continue to receive regular airplay on All India Radio in Panaji and Mumbai. Vaz also released an audio cassette titled Goencho Avaz featuring his Konkani songs, composed by his son Tony Vaz and Mike Machado. The cassette is now available in compact disc format. Vaz is particularly remembered for his role in the Konkani film Nirmon. The song "Kazar Zaunk Assa Ankwar Cholo," performed by Vaz himself in the film, attained enduring popularity among Goans and Konkani music enthusiasts worldwide, writes Cardozo.

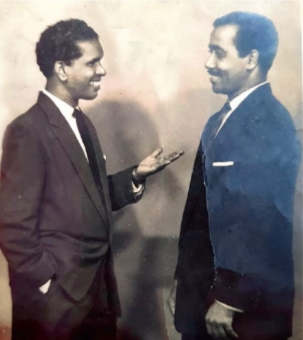
Vaz and M. Boyer snapped together

Throughout his career, Vaz participated in numerous tiatrs, both as a writer and director of his own productions, as well as collaborating with prominent playwrights and directors. Notable figures he collaborated with include João Agostinho Fernandes, Ernest Rebello, J.P. Souzalin, Aleixinho De Candolim, Minguel Rod, Kid Boxer, Master Vaz, Dioguinho D'Mello, J. A. Lobato, C. Alvares, Alfred Rose, M. Boyer, Rico Rod, Star of Arossim, and Prem Kumar. Vaz also held a position at Emissora de Goa (now All India Radio) for a period of time. Konkani historian and singer Wilson Mazarello praised Vaz for his musical sense and pleasant voice, noting his intolerance for subpar singing. Vaz was also a violinist. Towards the end of his career, Vaz extended his involvement in the tiatr scene by directing and writing numerous productions, in addition to his extensive acting repertoire of over 4,000 tiatrs. He composed and performed several popular songs, including "Nylon," "Pd. Agnel," "Bailank Lagon," "Bhair Kaddlo Dovo," "Dukracho Prat," "Kabai," "Koloi," "Mottorcar," "Rend Sedachem," and "Rock-N-Roll." Vaz's contribution to tiatr performances exceeded 1,000, encompassing both his own productions and those of others. He recorded songs on gramophone records, All India Radio, and cassettes. Additionally, he delivered a memorable performance in the Konkani film Mhoji Ghorkarn.

== Legacy ==
In May 2018, a collection of handwritten verses authored by Vaz was made publicly available. These original works, which included some of Vaz's well-known songs, had been carefully preserved by his family and were generously donated to the Goa State Central Library in January 2018. The donation was made with the intention of preserving Vaz's legacy for future generations. The texts consisted of over 50 songs, complete with lyrics, as well as information on the dates and venues of the corresponding tiatrs. To ensure easy access and preservation, the library digitized the handwritten material and compiled it into bound books.

The significance of Vaz's contributions to tiatr was further acknowledged with the erection of a statue in his birthplace of Mandur during the same year. The literary works of Vaz and Konkani writer Reginald Fernandes are considered to hold significant cultural and historical importance. Despite this, these writers remain relatively obscure to younger generations. Historically, there has been a lack of recognition for their contributions, resulting in their literature being largely undiscovered. According to library curator Carlos Fernandes, the existing body of their work represents a valuable and unique treasure trove, offering potential for enriching research endeavors for those interested in studying their writings.

== Selected stage works ==
| Year | Title | Role | Notes | Ref |
|---|---|---|---|---|
| | Hanv Patki | Singer/actor | Professional debut | |
| | Bhasailolo Nouro | Bridegroom | | |
| | Bodmas | Writer | | |
| | Gorvali | Writer | | |
| | Bandwala | Writer | | |
| 1955 | Main ani Sun | Writer | | |
