= Amchem Noxib =

- Poster of the film
- Directed by: A.Salam
- Produced by: Frank Fernand
- Starring: C. Alvares; M. Boyer; Alfred Rose
- Music by: Frank Fernand
- Release date: 1963
- Country: India
- Language: Konkani

Amchem Noxib (English translation: Our Luck) is a 1963 Indian Konkani-language film directed by A. Salam and produced by Frank Fernand. It is the second Konkani film, after Mogacho Anvddo, which released in 1950. Amchem Noxib was a trendsetter for the fledgling Konkani cinema.

== Cast ==
- C. Alvares
- Ophelia
- Rita Lobo
- Anthony Mendes
- Antonette Mendes
- M. Boyer
- Kid Boxer
- A. R. Souza Ferrão
- Remmie Colaço
- Cyriaco Dias
- Star of Arossim
- Titta Pretto
- Rico Rod
- Seby Coutinho
- Alfred Rose
- Philomena Braz
- Lucian Dias
- Leena Vaz
- Master Vaz

== Music ==
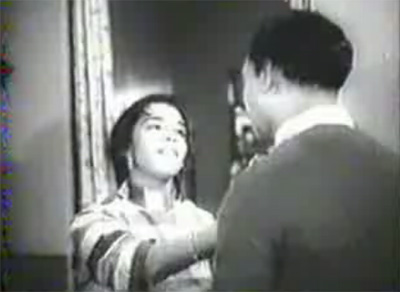

Amchem Noxib has some of Konkani cinema's most memorable and popular songs.

Song	Singer	Picturised on	Composer	Lyricist	Video
Don Kallzam (Sontos Bhogta)	Molly	Rita Lobo	?	C. Alvares	Video on YouTube
Molbailo Dou	Molly	C. Alvares, Rita Lobo	?	C. Alvares	Video on YouTube
Godacho Pav	Anthony Mendes	Anthony Mendes, Antonette Mendes	?	M. Boyer	Video on YouTube
I Lost My Heart To you	Molly	C. Alvares, Rita Lobo	Alfred Rose	Alfred Rose	Video on YouTube
Io Moga	Martha, Molly, Star of Arossim	C. Alvares, Rita Lobo, M. Boyer	?	Remmie Colaco	Video on YouTube
Mando Goencho (Ratchea Ranant)	Janet, Juliet, Molly	Rita Lobo	?	Remmie Colaco	Video on YouTube
Bencdaita Pai (Tum Nasloi)	Anthony Mendes, Antonette Mendes	Anthony Mendes, Antonette Mendes	?	C. Alvares	Video on YouTube
