= Rosalia Rodrigues =

Indian theatre actress and singer (1968–2013)

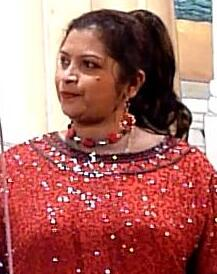
- Rodrigues in 2011
- Born: Mary Rosalia Agnela Odette Rodrigues; 4 September 1968; Ribandar, Goa, India
- Died: 13 September 2013 (aged 45); Miramar, Goa, India
- Burial place: Our Lady of Help Church cemetery, Ribandar, Goa, India
- Occupations: Actress; singer
- Years active: 1997–2013
- Employer(s): Goa Industrial Development Corporation, Panaji
- Awards: Kala Academy's "Best Actress Award"
- Website: facebook.com/mary.rosalia.33

Mary Rosalia Agnela Odette Rodrigues (4 September 1968 – 13 September 2013), known professionally as Rosalia Rodrigues, was an Indian theatre actress and singer who worked on the Konkani stage.

== Early life ==
Mary Rosalia Agnela Odette Rodrigues was born on 4 September 1968. She hailed from the locality of Patto in Ribandar, Goa, and emerged as an artist with a passion for music and acting. Rodrigues, the eldest of four children, was born to Luis Rodrigues, a civil servant, and Milagrina Conceição Fernandes, a homemaker. She had two sisters Marionette (born 1969), and Sandra, and a brother Austin (born 1971). From an early age, she displayed an inclination towards the arts. Encouraged by her father, who himself was a musician and scriptwriter, Rodrigues found a nurturing environment for her talents in the tiatrs, a unique form of Goan musical theatre, held in her hometown of Ribandar.

Rodrigues's journey into the limelight began during her primary school years, where she took to the Konkani stage with gusto. The theatrical performances in the local communities of Patto and Fondvem served as ideal venues for Rodrigues to exhibit her artistic abilities. Demonstrating aptitude both as an actress and a singer, Rodrigues quickly gained recognition as a child artist. Luis, father of Rodrigues, coordinated theatrical productions known as tiatrs in their hometown of Ribandar, where Rodrigues and her siblings were given the chance to demonstrate their artistic skills. In 1978, at the age of nine, Rodrigues received a special award for her singing talent in the tiatr production Bodlo, written by Konkani playwright Danny Fernandes. This honor was bestowed as part of the 5th Tiatr Competition held by the Kala Academy Goa during the 1978–1979 season.

== Career ==
Rodrigues was an acclaimed actress known for her performances in the tiatr, a form of Goan theater. She garnered recognition and was honored with several awards, notably the Best Actress Award, which she consistently won for three successive years in the tiatr competitions held by the Kala Academy in Panaji. Rodrigues showcased her talent for portraying tragic characters, captivating audiences with her emotive and powerful portrayals. Her understanding of the nuances of tragedy allowed her to deliver performances that left an impact on the audience. Not only was Rodrigues an actress, but she also possessed a singing voice. Her vocal abilities earned her additional accolades and prizes throughout her career. Her performances added an extra layer of depth and artistry to her theatrical endeavors. In addition to her involvement in tiatr, Rodrigues expanded her repertoire by participating in fells, which are traditional Goan street plays performed during the festive Carnival season in Goa. This further demonstrated her versatility as an actress and her commitment to exploring diverse forms of dramatic expression.

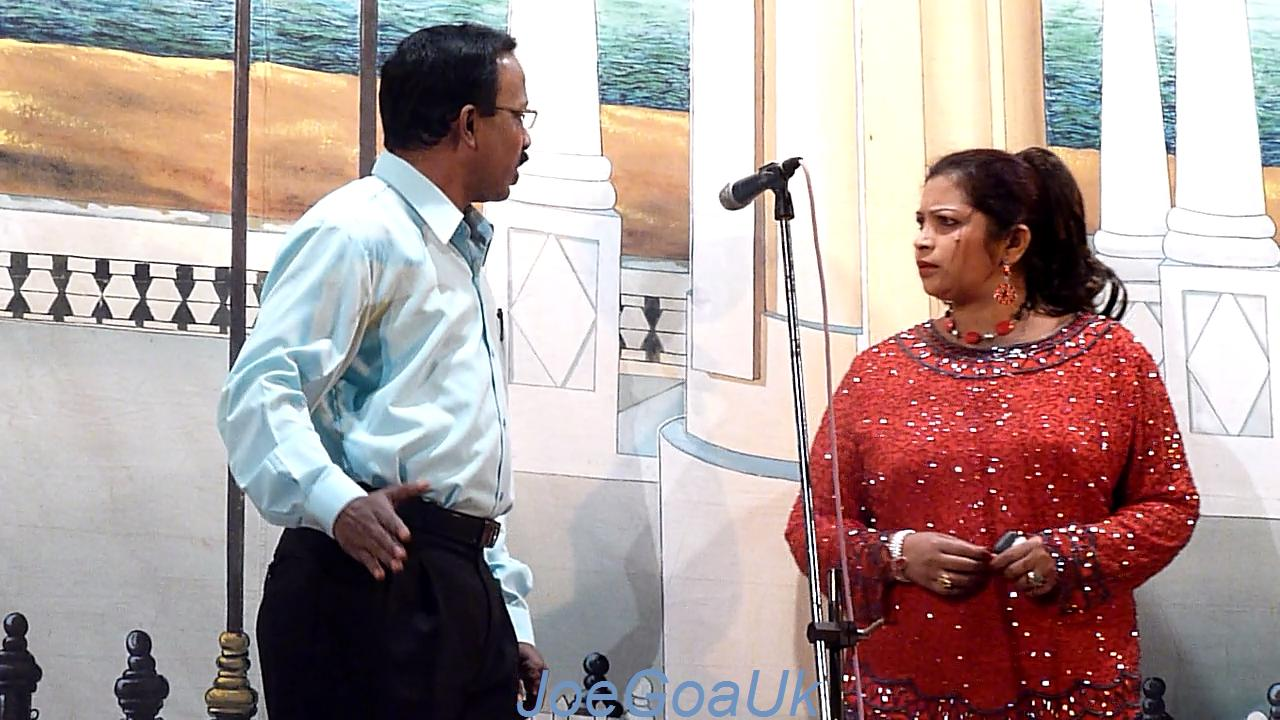
Rodrigues singing a duet alongside Agnelo in a 2011 tiatr production.

Rodrigues also made contributions to the commercial theater scene. She collaborated with Konkani tiatrists, including Comedian Agostinho, Comedian 64, Maxcy Pereira, Peter-Roshan, etc. Her involvement in these productions further solidified her reputation as a versatile performer. Rodrigues' impact on the Goan theater community extended beyond her acting and singing abilities. Her last known appearances in Goa included roles in former police officer and Konkani playwright Sammy Tavares' 2012 tiatr Aplean Bhurgeam Sangatak (With Their Children) and Konkani singer Junior Reagan's Teacher (2013), where she portrayed the role of a headmistress. These performances showcased her ability to bring characters to life with authenticity and conviction.

Rodrigues is known for her participation in various tiatr competitions organized by Kala Academy, Panaji. She made her debut as a child singer in 1978 and later took part in the 23rd Tiatr Competition (1997–1998) organized by Kala Academy Goa. In this competition, she was selected for the tiatr titled Dhondo (Business) directed by Diogo Fernandes, which was performed in Panaji in November 1997. Rodrigues portrayed the character of Aysha in the play, and her performance earned her a merit certificate in the female acting category. Additionally, she received a certificate in the duo category alongside her long-time castmate Gracy Rodrigues, with whom she had been performing since 1978. The following year, Rodrigues continued her involvement in the tiatr scene by participating in the 24th Tiatr Competition (1998–1999), once again directed by Diogo. She was cast in the theatrical production Sombondh (Relationship), where she portrayed the character of Ravina. Her acting skills led to her receiving another merit certificate in the female acting category. The play was staged in Panaji in 1998. In addition to her acting contributions, Rodrigues also made significant contributions as a duet singer in the same production. Her collaboration with Newton D'Souza in the duet earned them a cash prize of ₹250 (equivalent to ₹1,100 or US$13 in 2023).

During the late 1990s, Rodrigues actively participated in professional state tiatr competitions, which became a significant part of her career. One notable event was her involvement in the 25th Tiatr Competition held by the Kala Academy Goa in 1999–2000. In this competition, Rodrigues was cast in the tiatr titled Ekuch Kuttumbh (One Family), written by Diogo Fernandes, a Konkani playwright. This marked Rodrigues's third collaboration with Fernandes on a theatrical production. In Ekuch Kuttumbh, Rodrigues portrayed the character of Shanti and received the second-place award for Best Acting in the female category, along with a cash prize of ₹750 (equivalent to ₹3,200 or US$38 in 2023). As the 2000s began, Rodrigues continued her active participation in tiatr competitions. She took part in the 26th Tiatr Competition held in 2000–2001, once again under the direction of Diogo Fernandes. In this competition, she appeared in Diogo's tiatr titled Vishwass (Trust), playing the role of Sylvia. Rodrigues's performance earned her a merit certificate for acting in the female category. It is worth mentioning that Rodrigues had been associated with the Dramatic Troupe of Ribandar, led by Diogo Fernandes, since 1997. Prior to joining this troupe, she had started her journey as a child artist with the Clubo desportivo dos Jovens de Ribandar (transl. Youth Sports Club Ribandar), headed by Danny Fernandes. However, after her performance in 1978, Rodrigues left the club and joined Diogo and his fellow castmates, marking the beginning of a collaboration between them.

Rodrigues actively participated in tiatr competitions organized by the Kala Academy in Panaji throughout the 2000s. In the 28th Tiatr Competition held during 2002–2003, she delivered a performance as Sonia in the tiatr production called Sharonaeta (2002), which was written by her long-time collaborator Diogo Fernandes. Her acting skills earned her the first prize in the Best Acting category for female performers. The following year, Rodrigues, as a member of the Dramatic Troupe of Ribandar, took part in the 29th Tiatr Competition of 2003–2004. She played the role of Mary in Diogo's tiatr Parashrayee, and once again, she secured the first prize for Best Acting in the female category, along with a cash prize of ₹1,000 (equivalent to ₹3,700 or US$43 in 2023). During the early 2000s, Rodrigues achieved success and gained recognition from the state cultural institution, Kala Academy. She continued to pursue her passion and participated in subsequent professional tiatr competitions. In the 30th Tiatr Competition of 2004–2005, Rodrigues portrayed the character of Sarah in Diogo's tiatr Dhaago (Threads). Her performance in this role earned her the first prize for Best Acting in the female category, along with a cash prize of ₹1,000 (equivalent to ₹3,500 or US$42 in 2023). Rodrigues' involvement in tiatr competitions concluded in 2007, at the 33rd Tiatr 'A Group' competition of 2007–2008. In Diogo's tiatr production Dolleam Add, she played the role of Milly and received a merit certificate for her acting performance in the female category. This marked the end of Rodrigues' ten-year collaboration with playwright Diogo Fernandes and his theatrical group, the Dramatic Troupe of Ribandar.

== Personal life ==
Rodrigues never married or had any children, unlike her siblings who were married and had children. Her father, Luis, who was a civil servant and trumpeter, died on 22 May 2006. His funeral took place on 23 May, and he was buried in his hometown of Ribandar. In addition to her involvement in theater, Rodrigues worked at the Goa Daman and Diu Industrial Development Corporation (GDDIDC) in Panjim, which was later renamed to the Goa Industrial Development Corporation (Goa I.D.C). She resided in the neighborhood of Patto in Ribandar until her death in 2013.

== Death ==
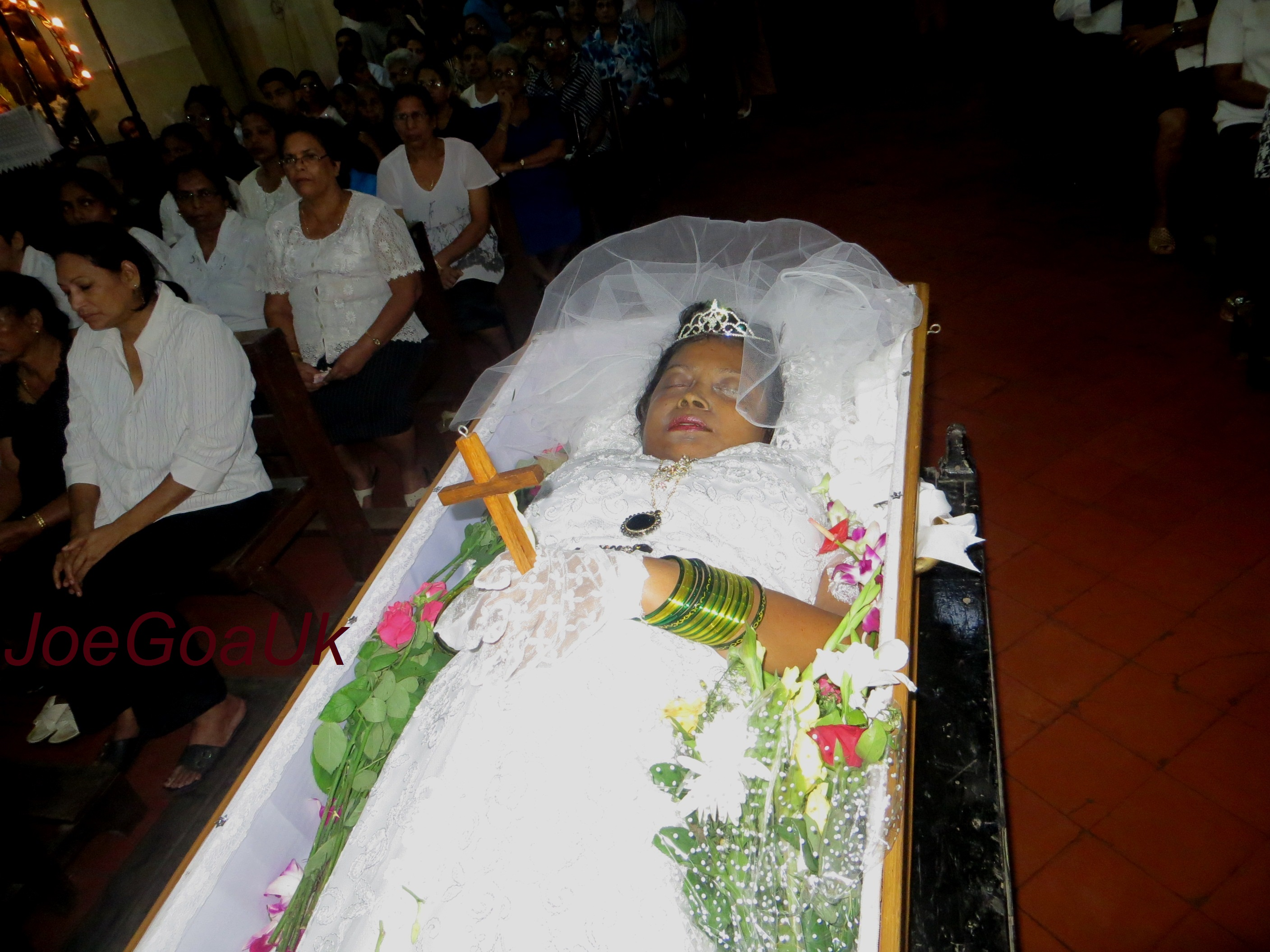
Rodrigues's funeral; shown is her body in a casket at Ribandar church.

On 13 September 2013, Rodrigues, aged 45, died at Esperança Hospital in the beach area of Miramar, Goa, in the state capital of Panaji. She had celebrated her 45th birthday just nine days ago. Despite performing on the stage the same year in Junior Reagan's tiatr Teacher in May 2013, Rodrigues' cause of death was undisclosed. Her funeral was held the next day on 14 September, where she was laid to rest at Nossa Senhora de Ajuda Church (also known as Our Lady of Help Church) in her hometown of Ribandar.

=== Reactions ===
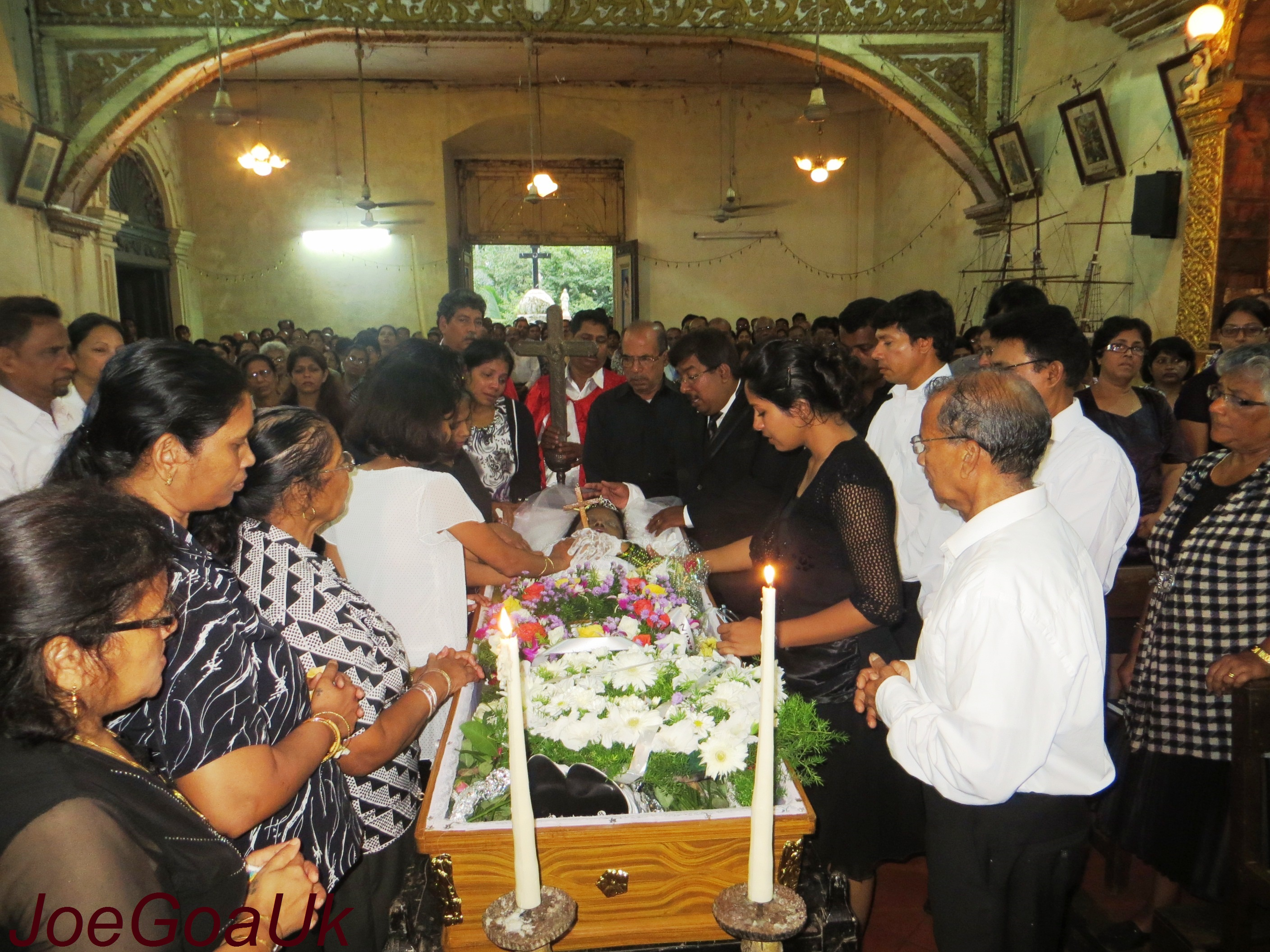
Rodrigues's close relatives and friends gather to pay their final respects before the burial.

Goa World, an online news website that is no longer operational, published a tribute in honor of Rodrigues and expressed their condolences. Francis de Verna, who was the president of Kuwait-Goa Tiatristanchi Sonvstha (KGTS) at that time, along with the managing committee and other members, extended their condolences to Rodrigues' family.
