= Ernest Rebello =

Goan playwright and director (1905–1945)

- Born: c. 1905; Ponolem, Goa, Portuguese India, Portuguese Empire (now in India)
- Died: 1945 (aged 39–40); Aldona, Goa, Portuguese India, Portuguese Empire
- Occupations: Playwright; director; composer; comedian
- Years active: 1920–1945
- Known for: Staging first tiatr at Princess Theatre Bhangwadi, Bombay

Ernest Rebello (c. 1905 – c. 1945) was an early 20th-century Goan playwright, theatre director, composer, former singer, and comedian who worked on the Konkani stage.

== Career ==
From a young age, Rebello displayed a natural talent for theater and had a particular knack for creating humorous songs. His ability quickly gained him acceptance among the public. Seeking job opportunities, Rebello relocated to Bombay, where After securing a job, he pursued his passion for singing and acting. Despite his lean physique, Rebello possessed a captivating range of facial expressions that captivated audiences, establishing him as a prominent comedian. Popular directors of the era began offering him roles, and his comic songs became sought-after, often receiving applause. Expanding his artistic horizons, Rebello ventured into scriptwriting and directing. His diminutive stature further enhanced his comedic presence on stage, providing him with an advantage in delivering his songs. Directors readily cast Rebello in comedic roles due to his effortless ability to elicit laughter from audiences with his gestures. Additionally, Rebello authored several tiatrs, with popular works including Hanv Patki (I Confess), Bomboinchi Istil (1940), and Avoicho Ghutt (Mother's Secret), which gained popularity and established him as a leading playwright. Rebello recognized the significance of publishing his tiatr scripts, setting him apart as one of the few playwrights of his time to do so.

Rebello achieved a milestone with the publication of his play Bomboinchi Istil in book format. Tiatr, a form of musical theater, had its initial staging at The New Alfred Theatre in Bombay on 17 April 1892, and subsequently found its way to several theaters. However, among these, the Princess Theatre Bhangwadi holds a distinct reputation as the premier destination for Konkani tiatr, often referred to as its Mecca. Rebello played a pivotal role in establishing the prominence of the Princess Theatre Bhangwadi for Konkani tiatr. He became the first playwright to showcase a tiatr production at this venue in Bombay. Prior to Rebello's breakthrough, the Bhangwadi Theatre primarily hosted Gujarati and Marathi dramas (nattaks), different theatrical forms. However, Rebello's introduction of tiatr marked a turning point, transforming the Princess Theatre into a coveted platform for Konkani tiatrists. Rebello's contribution extended beyond his efforts as a playwright. He provided a significant opportunity to Kid Boxer, a singer, by granting him his first professional stage performance in the commercial tiatr Bomboinchi Istil in 1940. Furthermore, it was Rebello who bestowed upon him the distinctive stage name "Kid Boxer." Boxer's debut in the tiatr genre propelled his career forward, leading to several offers from other directors. Rebello's prominence as a tiatrist flourished during the golden era of tiatr, spanning from the 1930s to the 1970s.

Rebello possessed a discerning talent for identifying promising newcomers and nurturing their potential through casting then in his tiatrs, a form of Konkani theater. Among those who benefited from Rebello's patronage was A. R. Souza Ferrão, a Konkani actor who received an early career opportunity to showcase his skills in Rebello's productions on the Konkani stage. Another beneficiary of Rebello's support was Jacinto Vaz, a Konkani comedian. Vaz secured his breakthrough in the industry when Rebello provided him with his first commercial break in the tiatr titled Hanv Patki. Vaz's performance, both in acting and singing, received praise and admiration from the audience, establishing him as an entertainer. Rebello also played a pivotal role in introducing Seby Coutinho, an aspiring actor, to the Konkani tiatr stage. Coutinho made his debut at the Princess Theatre Bhangwadi in Bombay through Rebello's tiatr titled Avoicho Ghutt. Additionally, Rebello discovered and introduced Konkani singer Romeo Mendes to the commercial stage in his tiatr Bomboichi Istil. Mendes captivated the audience with his rendition of the song "Maim Putak Axeta," earning applause and encores. Furthermore, Rebello played a significant role in launching the career of Master Vaz, a young talent who made his debut as a child artist in Rebello's tiatr Bomboichi Istil. Master Vaz's abilities endeared him to the audience, marking the beginning of his journey in the Konkani theater scene. During this period, Vaz adopted the stage name "Master Vaz," while Rebello composed songs specifically tailored for Vaz's performances.

== Personal life ==
Ernest Rebello was born in 1905 in Ponolem, Goa, which was a territory of Portuguese India under the Portuguese Empire (now located in India). At a young age, his skill in tiatr performance was recognized, and his knack for creating songs, even while still in school, earned him admiration and respect from those in his village. Rebello took pride in his role as a tiatrist, demonstrating proficiency in both singing and acting within the theatrical tradition. The village ward concerts provided an ideal opportunity for him and his friends to showcase their talents, leading to invitations to perform in concerts held in other wards as well. Over the course of time, Rebello established himself as one of the popular tiatrists in the village. Throughout his relatively brief life, Rebello devoted twenty-five years to tiatr. He died at his home in Aldona in 1945.

== Selected stage works ==
Year	Title	Role	Notes	Ref
1940	Bomboichi Istil	Writer/director		
	Hanv Patki	Writer/director		
	Avoicho Ghutt	Writer/director		
