= Ponolem =

Punolem
- village
- Location in Goa, India Punolem (India)
- Coordinates: 15°35′51″N 73°46′38″E
- Country: India
- State: Goa
- District: North Goa
- Taluka: Bardez

Government
  - Type: Panchayat

Languages
  - Official: Konkani
- Time zone: UTC+5:30 (IST)
- PIN: 403508
- Vehicle registration: GA 03
- Nearest city: Mapusa
- Lok Sabha constituency: North Goa
- Website: goa.gov.in

Ponolem (or Punolem) is a village in North Goa's Bardez taluka (sub-district), India. It lies in the Goa Assembly constituency of Aldona.

== Location ==
It has Carona village and Calvim to its west, and Maem or Mayem in Bicholim taluka is close to its eastern side. The Calvim bridge is also within short distance of Ponolem.

== Health centre ==
Along with Calvim and Carona, Punolem (or Ponolem) is covered by the Primary Health Centre at Aldona, which has a strength of 12 beds and covers some ten villages or areas (Bastora, Moira, Calvim, Pomburpa, Salvador do Mundo, Penha de France, Socorro, Corjuem, Brittona II or Betim, and the Aldona-Quitla area).

== Demographics ==
Census records of 2011 say Ponolem (their spelling) is a tiny village covering 92.10 hectares, has just 29 households, 120 persons (63 male and 57 female), and a total of 12 under-the-age-of-six children (comprising ten boys and three girls).
