= Holy Spirit Hospital (Mumbai) =

- Missionary Sisters Servants of the Holy Spirit
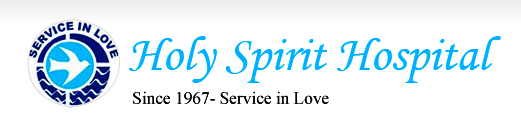

Geography
- Location: Andheri, Mumbai, Maharashtra, India
- Coordinates: 19.128°N 72.866°E

Organisation
- Type: Specialized and Teaching
- Religious affiliation: Roman Catholic
- Affiliated university: Maharashtra University of Health Sciences. National Board of Examinations. (NBE) Indian Diploma in Critical Care Medicine (IDCCM)

Services
- Emergency department: Yes:Trauma Care
- Beds: 300

Helipads
- Helipad: No

History
- Founded: 1964

Links
- Website: http://www.holyspirithospital.org/

Holy Spirit Hospital is a Charitable Trust Hospital located in Andheri, Mumbai, owned and managed by the Missionary Sisters Servants of the Holy Spirit, which began in 1964 as an out-patient clinic.

== History ==
In 1964, four nuns from the Netherlands-based Missionary Sisters Servants of the Holy Spirit established an outpatient medication dispensary under a tree in Andheri. By 1967 they had developed a 65-bed hospital which eventually grew to a comprehensive 300-bed facility. Later, a dirt track path between the Mahakali Caves and the hospital was replaced by a road extension from Chakala. BEST provided a twice-daily bus service at the hospital's request. One nun of the hospital's order, Sister Hermanelde, received the Cross of the Order of Merit.,

== Notable patients ==
- Roomel D'Souza: U-17 Maharashtra Hockey Player, had undergone surgery to treat bilateral hallux valgus, she was treated by Dr. Nicholas Antao
- Archbishop of Cuttack-Bhubaneswar Emeritus Mar Raphael Cheenath, was being treated for ill health. He died on 13 August 2017.
- Actor Nirmal Pandey, died following a cardiac arrest. He died at Mumbai's Holy Spirit hospital on 18 February 2010.
- Ashok Walam, protest panel head against Konkan oil refinery, who was admitted due to the chest pain and pressure which he was facing from the officers over the refinery issue.
- First air-born baby on board an Indian airline, Jetson Jose, born on board the Jet Airways Dammam-Kochi flight on 18 June 2017, and rushed to Holy Spirit hospital after the aircraft was diverted to Mumbai.
- Spanish Jesuit priest Father Federico Gussi Sopena, was in critical condition and was undergoing treatment.
