= St. Teresa's High School, Charni Road =

संत टैरेसा विद्यामंदिर St.Teresa's High School
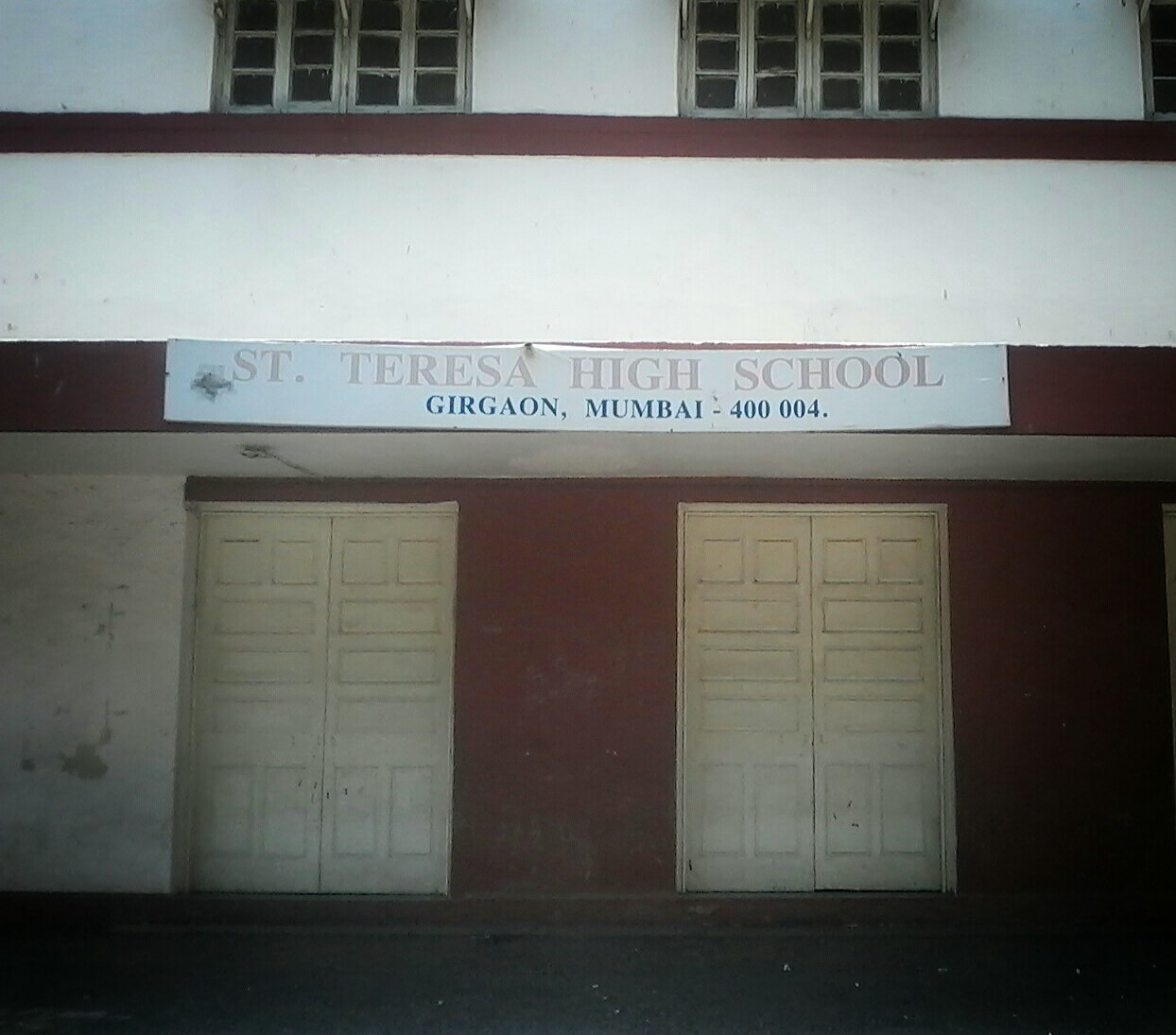
- School Hall

Location
- 315 New Charni Road, Girgaum 04; Mumbai, Maharashtra, 400004; India; 18°57′10″N 72°49′09″E

Information
- School type: Private Co-educational, government aided
- Religious affiliation: Christianity
- Established: 1924
- Status: Working
- School board: Maharashtra State Board of Secondary and Higher Secondary Education
- Authority: Archdiocesan Board of Education
- Administrator: Manager — Rev.Fr. Anthony J Fernandes
- Principal: Mrs. Mary Roy
- Grades: Kindergarten – 10th
- Gender: Co-educational
- Age range: 3 - 15
- Average class size: 58
- Education system: Maharashtra State Board of Secondary and Higher Secondary Education
- Classes offered: Jr KG to 10th
- Language: English (Indian)
- Hours in school day: 5
- Classrooms: 32
- Campus: 3 Ground
- Campus size: Huge
- Campus type: Urban
- Houses: Nehru Gandhi Tilak Tagore
- Colours: Red, green, yellow, blue
- Song: Wonderful words beautiful words
- Athletics: Cricket, football, baseball, badminton
- Nickname: STHS
- Affiliation: Archdiocesan Board of Education

St. Teresa's High School (STHS) is a government aided, private co-educational day school, located at Charni Road in Mumbai, India. The institution was founded in 1843, and present day school building was established in 1924.

The school caters to pupils from kindergarten up to grade 10 and the medium of instruction is English. The school is affiliated to the Archdiocesan Board of Education, Mumbai, which conducts the Maharashtra State Board of Secondary and Higher Secondary Education examinations at the close of class 10.

== Campus site and layout ==
The school campus comprises three separate buildings and features three lines

== Admissions and curriculum ==
=== Admissions ===
The admission notice for Junior kindergarten is put up in January. During the admission procedure, preference is given to Catholics and siblings of former students.

=== Curriculum ===
The school follows the Maharashtra State Board of Secondary and Higher Secondary Education syllabus. English is the medium of instruction; Hindi is taught as a second language, and Marathi is taught as a third language.

The academic year, which commences in June and concludes in April, is segregated into first unit test, first term, second unit test, and second term. The first term is from June until November and the second term is from November until April. The results of these terms are first shown to the students, and after that to the parents on the open house days; the report of the pupil's performance is presented to the parents after the completion of a term. Tests are conducted periodically and examinations are held at the end of every term. The courses of studies extend from kindergarten to grade 10, at the end of which students appear for the SSC Examinations. The school's students have consistently performed well at the SSC examinations and the school has maintained a 100% passing-rate.

==== Extracurricular activities ====
Emphasis is placed on extracurricular activities. Inter-house debates, elocution, dramatics and sporting competitions are also a part of the cultural lives of the students. The school also takes part in science exhibitions and quizzes conducted.

== Uniform ==
Students from grades 1 to 8 are required to wear blue short-sleeved shirts with white stripes, paired with blue short pants. Boys in grades 8 to 10 transition to blue long pants, while girls wear a blue six-piece skirt with a white blouse. Regular black leather shoes are part of the standard school attire, with ties and t-shirts provided by the school.

On days designated for Physical Education (P.E.), primary section boys wear black short pants and t-shirts in their respective house colours, while girls wear black skirts and house-coloured t-shirts. Older students also wear black long pants and house-coloured t-shirts for P.E. sessions.

== The St Teresa's Parent Teacher Association (P.T.A) ==
The P.T.A. aims towards at fostering cordial and friendly relations between the members of the staff and the parents of the students so that there is better understanding and co-operation between the home and the school. From each class, one parent is elected as the P.T.A. representative of that specific class.

== List of scholarships ==
- Miss Elizabeth Rowe Scholarship for a catholic student securing a first class and highest among the catholic students in the S.S.C. board.
- Mr Mathew and Teresa D'souza Scholarship for the most outstanding student of standard 10.
- Late Mr Owen Pereira Scholarship for a catholic student who gets highest among catholic students in standard 9.
- Late Mr Owen Pereira Scholarship for the best all-round student in athletics and games girl.
- Late Mr Owen Pereira Scholarship for the best all-round student in athletics and games boy.
- Late Antonette Totsie Sitlani (née Misquitta) Scholarship for the student who gets highest in the S.S.C. Board exam.
- Late Antonette Totsie Sitlani (née Misquitta) Scholarship for the catholic student who gets highest in the S.S.C. Board exam (minimum 70%).
- Combine scholarship given for General Proficiency by Cynthia Fernandes, Rita Misquita, Yvette D'sylva, ex-student Cherylann, Motiram Jayakar, Eugeno Pereira, Dr Shankar Shesh, Zita Fernandes, Pramila M. Jayakar, Tommy Crasto, Kershap V. Nawathe, Fr. Gerald Fernandes. Fr. Roque Peretra, Isabel Fernandes, Shirdhar V. Setlur, Effie Rodrigues, Peter Chaves and Katherine Remedios, Evelyn Colaco, Laxmibai Kantak, Fr. Paul Fernandes, Msgr. Eustace D'Lima for standard 5 to standard 10.
- Mr and Mrs C. G. Pratap scholarship to the best all-round student of the secondary school: standard 5 to standard 10.

== Culture ==
St Teresa's is a cosmopolitan school. The school imparts Christian values to the children. The Christmas concert is celebrated every December. A sports meet and a farewell party for students who are passing out of the institution are also held annually.

The school also holds some traditions to be maintained by all the students of the school; they are mentioned in the school diary. They are:

- To always be friends with one another and respectful towards elders—in and out of the school.
- To avoid vulgarity in talk and behaviour.
- To accept whatever work is assigned with joy and pride.
- To be courteous, and develop sportsmanship—like with officials and with opposing teams of different Houses.
- To respect the liberty and rights of other pupils.
- To learn and observe good manners everywhere.
- To only converse in English.

== Gallery ==
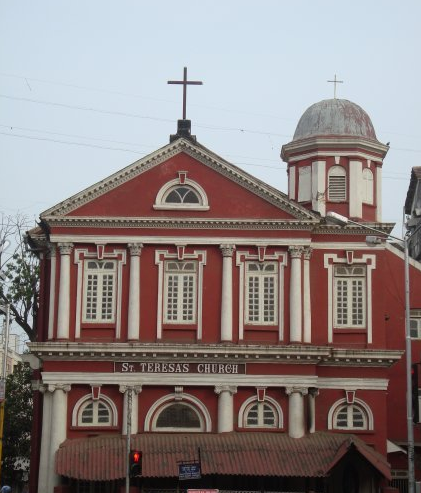
St Teresa's Church

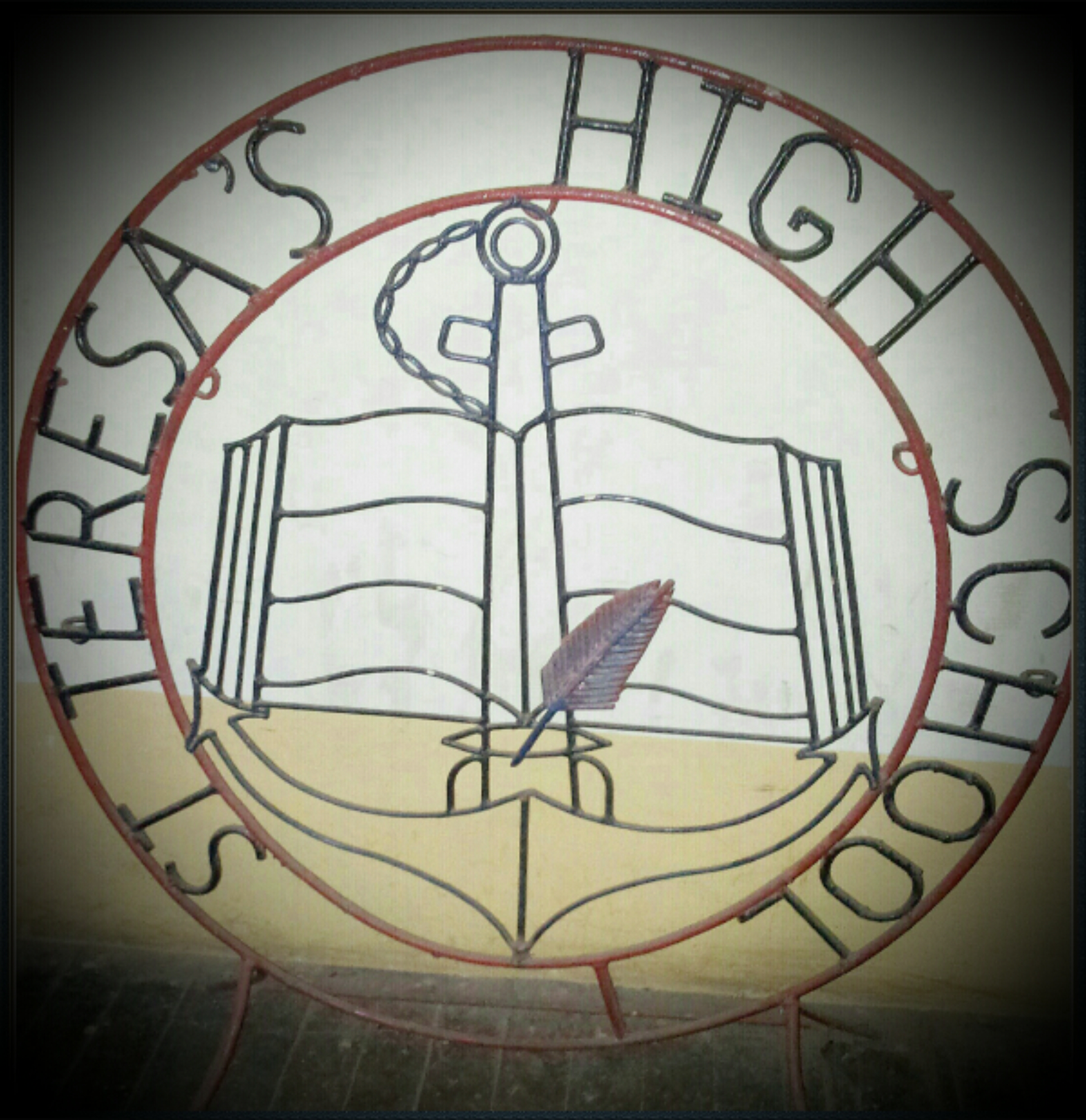
Emblem

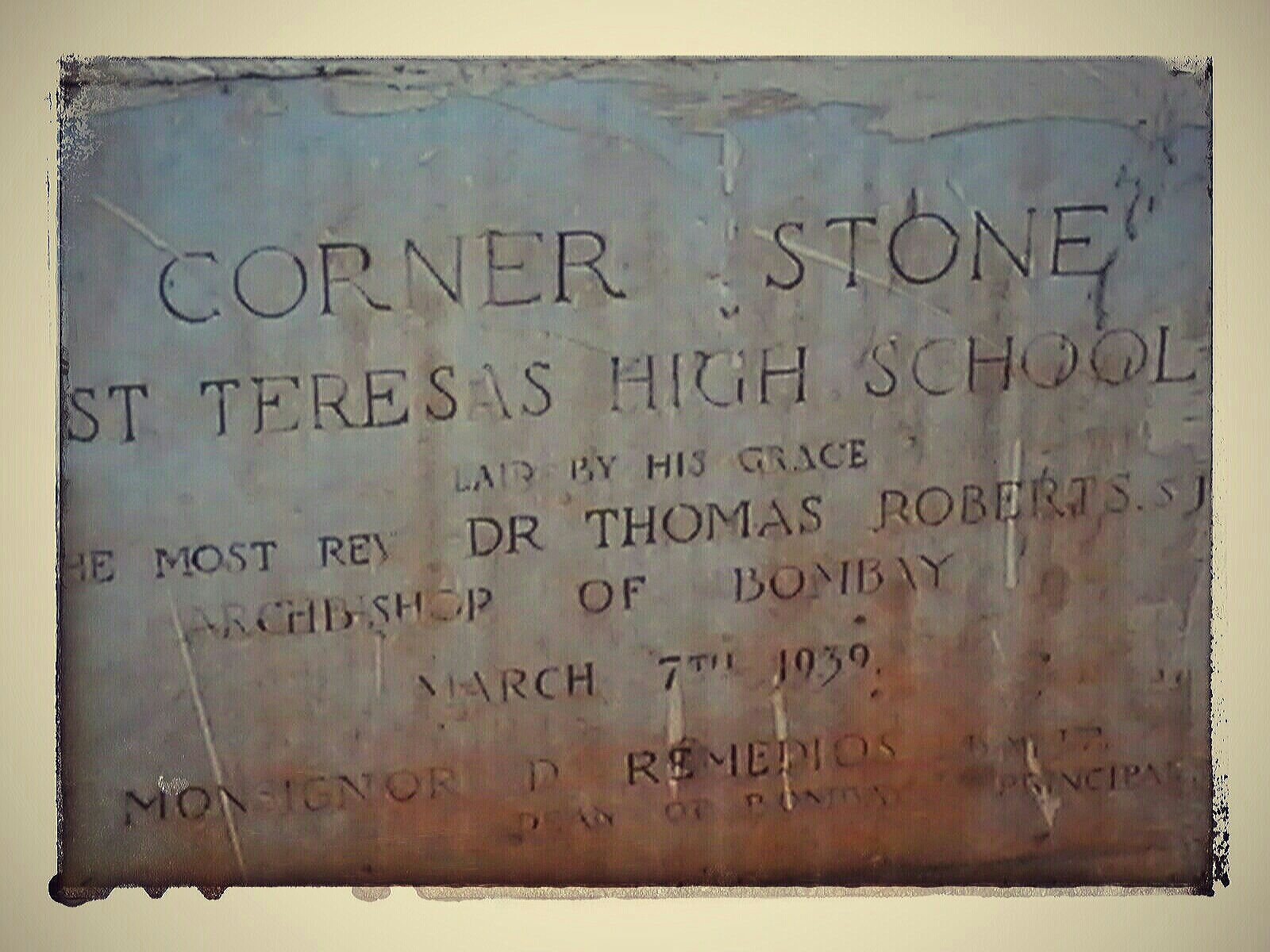
Corner Stone

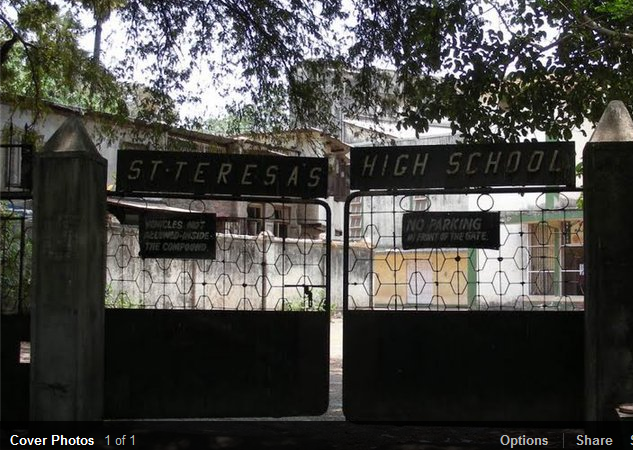
Main Gate

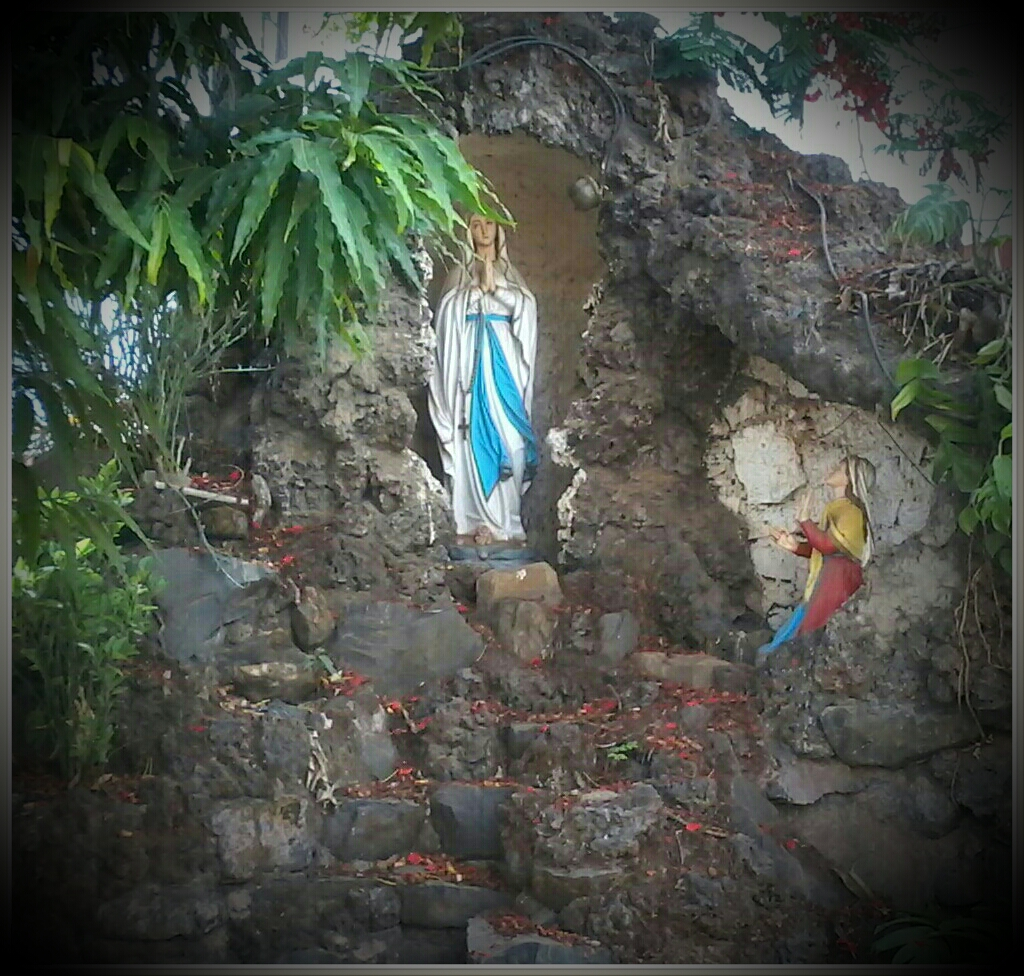
School Monument

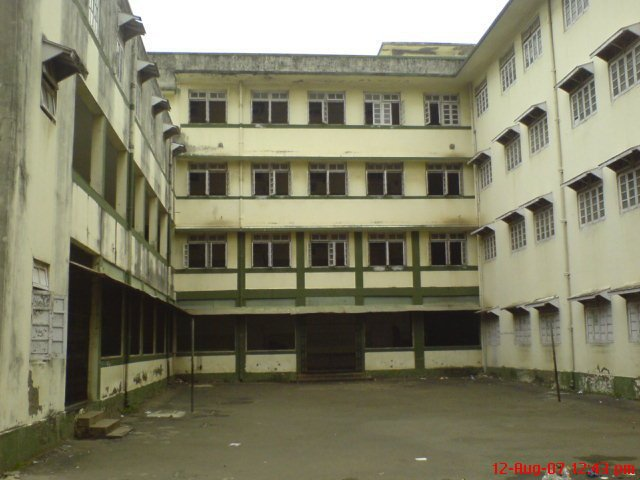
Quadrangle

== See also ==
- Education in India
- Roman Catholic Archdiocese of Bombay
- List of schools in Mumbai
