= Kid Boxer =

Indian singer and writer (1917–1991)

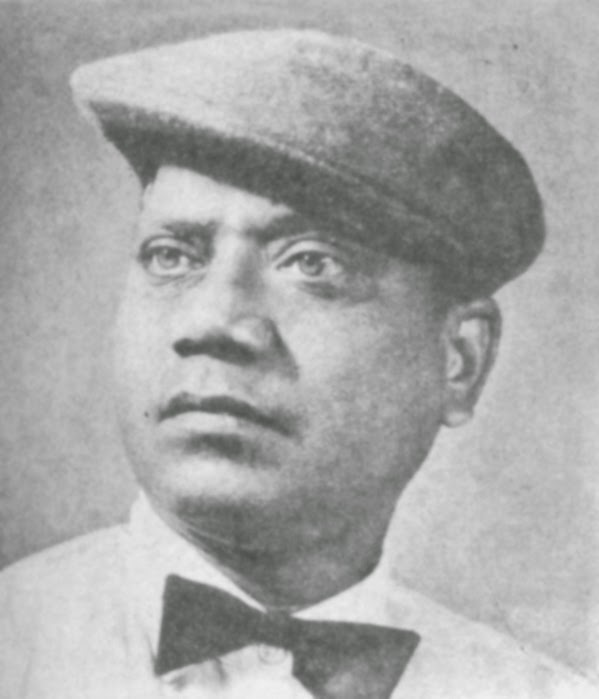
- The only surviving portrait of Pereira
- Born: Caetano Manuel Pereira; 17 February 1917; Siolim, Goa, Portuguese India
- Died: 3 March 1991 (aged 74); Bombay, Maharashtra (now Mumbai), India
- Other name: Boxer
- Occupations: Singer; writer; theatre director; lyricist; comedian
- Years active: 1940–c. 1991
- Notable work: Amchem Noxib (1963)

Caetano Manuel Pereira (17 February 1917 – 3 March 1991), known professionally as Kid Boxer, was an Indian singer, writer, director, comedian, and lyricist who worked on the Konkani stage. He is best known for being the member of the popular Kid-Young-Rod trio.

== Early life ==
Caetano Manuel Pereira was born on 17 February 1917, in Siolim, Goa, a region that was part of Portuguese India during the era of the Portuguese Empire. At a young age of 8, Pereira relocated to Bombay (now Mumbai) with his father. During his time in Bombay, he acquired a command of the English language through interactions with older individuals, while also developing his proficiency in Konkani, due to his avid readership of the literary work Dor Mhoineachi Rotti. Pereira's journey into the world of theater began with apprenticeships in smaller productions. In 1940, he made his debut in the commercial tiatr genre, with his performance in Ernest Rebello's production, Bomboich Istil.

== Career ==
Pereira made his first foray into the world of tiatr, with his debut production called Ostori (Woman). However, it was his subsequent work titled Kidachem Sopon (Kid's Dream) that garnered popularity. Pereira's repertoire encompassed a diverse range of tiatrs, including Editor Ponch de Bombaim, Amchi Bhett (Our Offering), Amcho Ganv (Our Village), Bhattam Bensam, Avoichim Dukham (Mother's Tears), Ankvar ani Kazari (Bachelor and Married), Zata tem Boreak (It Happens For Good), Bhoinn (Sister), Militar (Military), Zulum (Injustice), Amchim Natalam (Our Christmas), Goa, Mhoji Maim (My Mother), Lojechem Kopel, Mog Antticho, Mumboiche Gõykar (Goans Of Mumbai), Bankruttan Bankrutt, Budhvont Put Ganvcho (The Cunning Son of the Village), Fuddar (Future), Mhozo Oprad, Adeus vo Nimnni Bhett (Goodbye, this is the final offering), and Somzonnent Chuk Zali.

The latter work, published by the Goa Konkani Akademi, delved into the complexities of the human psyche and explored the detrimental effects of prejudice, leading to grave misunderstandings. This particular play demonstrated Pereira's ability to artfully blend elements of seriousness and humor without resorting to melodrama. Towards the end of his career, Pereira presented his final show in Goa entitled Bapul Bhau (Cousin Brother). Additionally, he took on the role of director for several tiatrs by Minguel Rod, including Bapul Bhau, Gorib Xezari (Poor Neighbour), and Ghorchem Kestaum (Family Feud). During his artistic journey, Pereira had a cameo in the well-received Konkani film Amchem Noxib.

== Personal life ==
Pereira was known for his early advocacy of individual rights, showcasing determination from a young age. He opposed various forms of injustice, including those directed at women, the entrenched caste system, and governmental policies.

In the earlier stages of his life, Pereira's mischievous demeanor led to him being given the moniker "Boxer," a nickname which later served as the inspiration for his chosen stage name, Kid Boxer. André Rafael Fernandes writes in his book "When the Curtains Rise...Understanding Goa's Vibrant Konkani Theatre," Pereira formed a trio called the Kid-Young-Rod, which gained recognition for their singing abilities in the realm of tiatrs.

Fernandes further explains that, Pereira's expertise was in creating satirical songs infused with proverbs. Additionally, he excelled at crafting quick-witted responses during musical debates, particularly when pitted against Aleixinho De Candolim. Pereira died in Bombay, aged 74.

== Filmography ==
Year	Title	Role	Notes	Ref
1963	Amchem Noxib		Supporting character	

== Selected stage works ==
Year	Title	Role	Notes	Ref
1940	Bomboich Istil		Professional debut	
	Ostori	Writer/director	Debut as writer/director	
	Kid-achem Sopon	Writer/director		
c. 1967	Somzonnent Chuk Zali	Writer		
	Amchim Natalam	Writer/director		
	Editor Ponch de Bombaim	Writer/director		
	Amcho Ganv	Writer/director		
	Ankvar ani Kazari	Writer/director		
	Zata tem Boreak	Writer/director		
	Bhoinn	Writer/director		
	Militar	Writer/director		
	Zulum	Writer/director		
	Mhoji Maim	Writer/director		
	Goa	Writer/director		
	Bankruttan Bankrutt	Writer/director		
	Amchi Bhett			
	Bhattam Bensam			
	Avoichim Dukham			
	Lojechem Kopel			
	Mog Antticho			
	Mumboiche Gõykar	Writer/director		
	Budhvont Put Ganvcho			
	Fuddar	Director		
	Adeus vo Nimnni Bhett	Writer/director		
	Mhozo Oprad	Writer/director		
	Gorib Xezari	Director		
	Ghorchem Kestaum	Director		
	Bapul Bhau	Director	Final production	
