= Repertoire =

Set of artistic pieces or roles which a person or group is prepared to perform

A repertoire (/ˈrɛpərtwɑːr/) or repertory is the list or set of works a person or company is accustomed to performing. Whether the English or French spelling is used has no bearing, but it was the French word, with an accent on the first e, répertoire, that first took hold, in 1847, derived from the late Latin word repertorium. The readiness or preparedness of persons or companies to perform certain works gives rise to an identifiable "standard repertory" in theatre, ballet, opera, choral music, chamber music, guitar recitals, piano recitals, organ recitals, orchestral music and indeed all other "performing arts" forms.

== See also ==
- Playlist – Curated list of video or audio files
- Setlist – Ordered list of elements an artist intends to present
