= Minguel Rod =

Goan singer and composer (1924–1955)

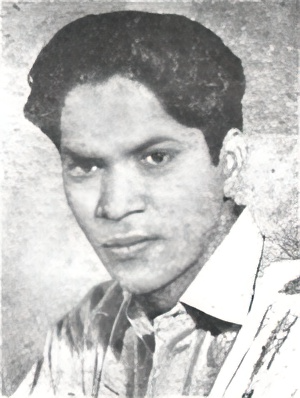
- Portrait of Rodrigues during his youth
- Born: Miguel Manoel Rodrigues; 10 August 1924; Cortalim, Goa, Portuguese India
- Died: 4 October 1955 (aged 31) (Note: Some sources claim that Rodrigues died at the age of 32, which is incorrect. However, reliable sources, such as the book 100 Years of Konkani Tiatro by Wilson Mazarello, published in 2000, state that he died at the age of 31.); Cortalim, Goa, Portuguese India
- Other names: M. Rod.
- Occupations: Singer; composer; playwright; actor
- Years active: 1936; 1941–c. 1955

Miguel Manoel Rodrigues (10 August 1924 – 4 October 1955), known professionally as Minguel Rod, was a Goan singer, composer, playwright, and actor known for his work in tiatr productions. One of the greatest composers of the Konkani stage, he was a leading figure in the golden phase of tiatr from the 1940s to the mid-1950s, alongside Konkani actor C. Alvares. Throughout his career, he composed over 300 kantaram and wrote 32 tiatrs, many of which were well-received and popular among his audience.

== Early life ==
Minguel Rodrigues, was born as Miguel Manoel Rodrigues on 10 August 1924, to Manoel Rodrigues and Dominica Vicente, he hailed from a financially disadvantaged family in the village of Cortalim, located in the southern region of Goa. Rodrigues embarked on a career as a playwright, staging his tiatrs, in a neighbor's verandah, using improvised curtains made from bed sheets. Initially, his productions catered to a local audience, presenting shorter tiatrs within his native village.

Rodrigues ventured into creating longer dramas aimed at larger crowds. However, in his eagerness to showcase his work, he overlooked the requisite procedure of obtaining a performance license from the government authorities. The Portuguese administration, under whose colonial rule Goa remained at the time, became aware of this transgression and endeavored to apprehend Rodrigues. However, the young Rodrigues managed to evade capture by fleeing Goa and finding refuge in the city of Bombay (now Mumbai).

== Career ==
During his stay in Bombay, Rodrigues actively searched for opportunities to establish himself as an actor in tiatrs. However, his endeavors met with limited success, leaving him disappointed. Undeterred, he even ventured into producing his own short play, but failed to gain recognition or advancement in his career. Despite the challenges he faced, Rodrigues did manage to secure a chance to demonstrate his singing skills in a tiatr directed by Anthony De Sa. This opportunity did not lead to any significant breakthroughs or new avenues for his professional growth.

However, Rodrigues' fortunes began to change when he received news that the Portuguese regime, which had been keeping an eye on him, was no longer pursuing him. This development provided him with a glimmer of hope and motivated him to make a discreet return to his homeland in 1943, coinciding with João Agostinho Fernandes' plans to present the tiatr production titled Bebdo (Drunkard) in Mapuça, featuring an ensemble cast.

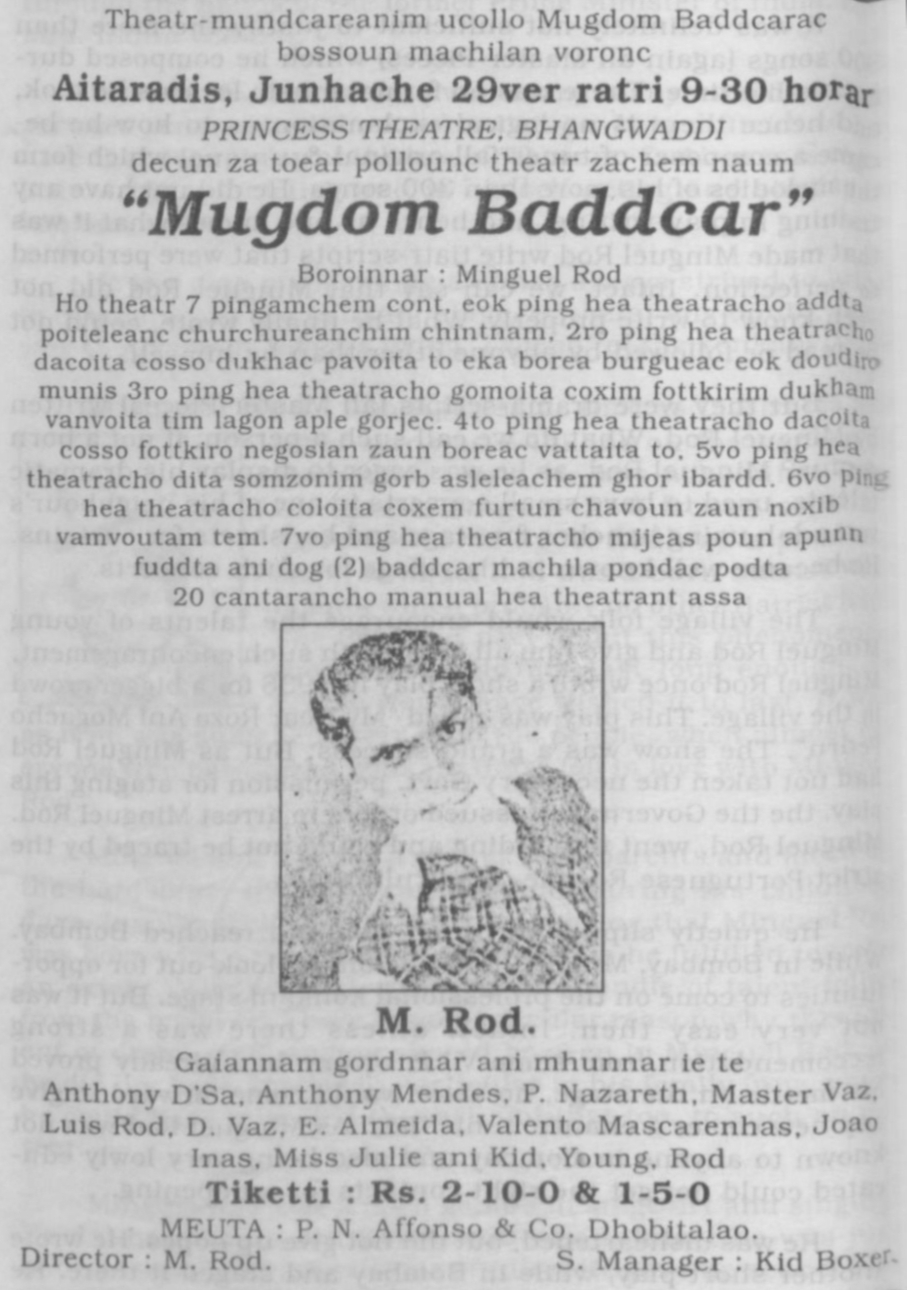
Sample of a flyer for Rodrigues's theater production Mugdom Baddcar

Upon learning of Rodrigues' return to Goa, Fernandes extended an invitation for him to showcase his singing talent in his tiatr. It was the production titled Bebdo that served as Rodrigues' much-awaited breakthrough. His vocal performance in the play left a lasting impression on the audience, leading Fernandes to promptly recommend him to Souza Ferrao. Ferrao, who was organizing his own tiatr called Xetkampti (Farmer), saw the potential in Rodrigues and eagerly included him in the cast. One of Rodrigues' solo kunbi songs, "Naum Minguelll", emerged as the standout piece in Xetkampti and garnered significant acclaim. Subsequently, numerous offers began to pour in, with Bombay-based contractors vying to secure Rodrigues for their upcoming shows. Capitalizing on his newfound popularity, Rodrigues ventured into writing his own tiatrs.

In 1945, Rodrigues unveiled his first full-length tiatr, Duddvancho Fors (Power of Wealth), which enjoyed immediate success. Contractors quickly recognized that Rodrigues' tiatrs not only delivered an entertaining experience but also tackled profound themes and showcased beautiful singing in each act. Rodrigues was diligent in ensuring that his productions featured three songs: a regular solo, a comic solo, and a duet or trio performance with his colleagues. Moreover, Rodrigues' regular appearances on All India Radio further elevated his stature, and his songs gained widespread popularity through His Master's Voice. Among his notable renditions are "Burgueponn", "Tarvotti", and "Dotik Rodditat", which have achieved enduring status as beloved classics.

== Death ==
Rodrigues struggled with alcoholism, and he died due to it on 4 October 1955, at the age of 31 at his residence in Cortalim, Goa.

== Legacy ==
The death of Rodrigues had a profound impact on the Konkani community, particularly in Colonial Goa. The official radio station of Goa, Emisora de Goa (now All India Radio of Prasar Bharati), dedicated a significant portion of their broadcast to provide a live commentary on the funeral procession. This commentary was delivered by Allen Costa, who also paid homage to Rodrigues by playing his songs for a continuous duration of two hours. Such a tribute was a rare honor bestowed upon a tiatrist (a performer in the traditional Goan theatre form known as tiatr).

== Cultural impact ==
In 1976, Richard Fernandes undertook an endeavor to revive the artistic legacy of Rodrigues who had died two decades prior. Fernandes assumed the roles of director and producer to bring Rodrigues' tiatr, titled Irmanv-achem Cazar (Brother's Wedding), back to life. This theatrical production was meticulously organized, weighing the various factors involved, such as its strengths, weaknesses, and overall satisfaction of the director and actors. The tiatr resonated well with the audience, instilling confidence in Fernandes and prompting him to continue the tradition. The following year, Fernandes directed and produced another tiatr written by Rodrigues, titled Ghorachem Kestaum, further contributing to the preservation of Rodrigues' artistic legacy.

During this period, a significant community of Goan expatriates who had migrated from East Africa had settled in Canada. The performances of the aforementioned tiatrs deeply resonated their hearts. Inspired by the success of Rodrigues' works, individuals such as Frank D'Souza, Margaret D'Souza, Delphine D'Souza, Braz D'Cruz, Frank Fernandes, and Zulema D'Souza joined forces with Richard Fernandes to establish a theatrical group known as The Goan Theatrical Group (GTG). Margaret D'Souza took on the responsibility of scripting the performances in English, which were then translated into Konkani to cater to the Konkani-speaking community residing in Toronto, Canada. The GTG embarked on a journey, creating and presenting their own theatrical productions for nearly two decades.

Among the productions presented by The Goan Theatrical Group were: Alzirachem Sopon (1978), produced by Lina Remedios, Divors Matarponnar (1980), directed by Frank De Souza, Tegui Bailo (Three Women) (1981), directed by Frank De Souza, Kalljidar Bhoinn (Brave Sister) (1982), directed by Frank De Souza, Peleachi Nosai (1983), directed by Errol Francis, Gupit Mog (Secret Love) (1984), translated by Lynn Souza Marques and written and directed by Margaret De Souza, Atancho Teomp (1986), directed by Margaret De Souza, Konn Mhozo Pai (Who Is My Father) (1987), translated by Maggie Francis and written and directed by Margaret De Souza, Ojeapanchi Bhett (Surprising Sacrifice) (1988), translated by Frank De Souza and written and directed by Margaret De Souza, Rateor (1990), translated by Frank De Souza and written and directed by Margaret De Souza, Doria Amchem Noxib (1995), translated by Maggie Francis and written and directed by Margaret De Souza.

Rodrigues's tiatrs played a significant role in fostering the tiatr culture within the Canadian community. Similarly to Goa, the tiatr activities in Canada came to a halt due to the impact of the COVID-19 pandemic. However, as of August 2022, the Konkani-speaking diaspora anticipates the revival of tiatr performances now that the restrictions imposed in the aftermath of the pandemic have been lifted.

== Selected stage works ==
Year	Title	Role	Notes	Ref
1936	My Dear Roza Ani Mogacho Pedru	Writer	Short play	
1941	Untitled tiatr	Singer	Debut tiatr	
1943	Bebdo	Singer		
	Xetkampti	Singer		
1945	Duddvancho Fors	Writer/singer	Debut as playwright	
1976	Irmanv-achem Cazar	Writer/singer	re-release by Richard Fernandes	
1977	Ghorachem Kestaum	Writer/singer	re-release by Richard Fernandes	

== Select discography ==
- Burgueponn
- Dotik Roddttat
- Tarvotti
