= Affonceka =

Portuguese theatre actor and playwright

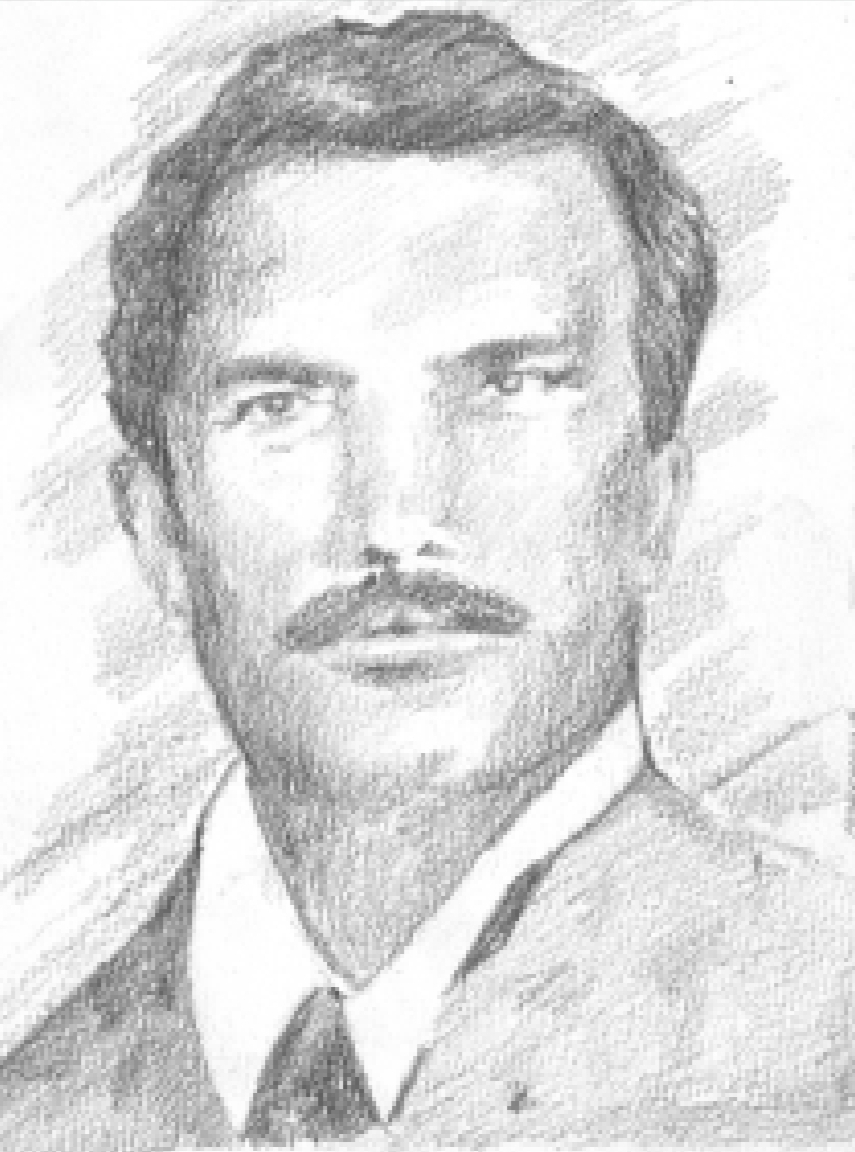
- Portrait of Afonso during his youth
- Born: Assis João Avelino Afonso; 1898 (age 127–128); Aldona, Goa, Portuguese India
- Other names: A. Fonseca
- Occupations: Actor; playwright; theatre director
- Years active: 1920–1940s

Assis João Avelino Afonso (1898 – unknown), known mononymously as Affonceka, was a Goan theatre actor, playwright, and theatre director known for his work in tiatr productions. From the 1920s to the 1940s, he played a pivotal role in the development and progress of Konkani tiatr.

== Early life ==
Assis João Avelino Afonso was born in 1898 in Corjuem, a village located in Aldona, Goa, which was under Portuguese rule as part of Portuguese India at the time (now part of India). He was raised in the village of Marcel, Goa, which had evolved into a census town.

== Career ==
Afonso made his debut in the theatrical scene in 1920, appearing in a tiatr titled Maurice ani Juliana vo A Real Love Story. This tiatr, written by Rama and directed by Rama's wife, marked Afonso's first role as Ramis, the servant. Konkani historian and singer Wilson Mazarello writes, despite the limited nature of his part, Afonso's performance left an impact on the audience, garnering recognition for his potential as an actor. Following his debut, Afonso was offered the role of Iago in a Konkani adaptation of Shakespeare's play Othello. Mazarello further writes, demonstrating his talent and ability, Afonso excelled in this role. Subsequently, he accepted roles in tiatrs crafted by popular playwrights and directors. Initially, Afonso became associated with the Marcela Principal Dramatic Company, which later transformed into the Star Principal Dramatic Company.

In due course, Afonso established his own theatrical company, named the Star Affonceka Dramatic Company. In 1924, he ventured into playwriting with his inaugural tiatr, Lawrie Ani Merina, which enjoyed success during its performance at the Gaiety Theatre in Bombay. The production attracted a full house, resulting in many individuals being unable to secure tickets. One of Afonso's most acclaimed tiatrs was Anjelin Bombainchi Puzadkarn, featuring notable cast members such as Miss Carlota, who made her debut in a leading role on the Konkani stage. Carlota's portrayal opposite Anthony Tooloo, a popular artist of the time, further propelled her into the limelight. Afonso's reputation as a theatrical director continued to flourish, and he went on to pen several more tiatrs, including Lisboachem Sopon (Dream of Lisbon), Xins Guilbertachem (Disciples of Guilbert), Ibonez Ani Yoanda, Imperador Nero Vo Nimnno Caesar Patxai Romancho (Emperor Nero or Final Emperor of Rome Caesar), and Anjelin Bombainchi Puzadkarn. Afonso is best known for his portrayal of Judge Gerald in J. P. Souzalin's theatrical production Bhott Ailolo Pomburpechea Festak (Hindu priest's arrival at Pomburpa's feast).

== Legacy ==
Afonso was commemorated at the Somplelea Tiatristancho Ugddas monthly program organized by the Tiatr Academy of Goa (TAG) on various dates, including 12 January 2012, 30 January 2015, 23 January 2018, and 29 January 2020. These events took place at different venues, such as TAG's Conference Hall at Campal Trade Centre in Panaji and the Black Box at Ravindra Bhavan in Margao. Alongside Afonso, several other artists were also remembered, including Mary Vaz, Alex Piedade Fernandes, Tony Friend, Karachiwalla, J. R. Fithna, Lucasinho Ribeiro, Shrirang Narvekar, Xavier Fernandes, Rico Rod, Jr. Rod, Meena Leitao, Agnelo Agato Francisco Dias, Cajetan Francis Pinto, Alex Mestri, Young Chico, and Wilma Pacheco. These special programs aimed to acknowledge and highlight the contributions made by these individuals within the realm of tiatr.

== Selected stage works ==
Year	Title	Role	Notes	Ref
1920	Maurice ani Juliana vo A Real Love Story	Ramis	Professional debut	
	Othello	Iago	Konkani adaptation	
1924	Lawrie Ani Merina	Writer	Debut as a playwright	
1934	Anjelin Bombainchi Puzadkarn	Writer/director		
	Lisboachem Sopon	Writer/director		
	Xins Guilbertachem	Writer/director		
	Ibonez Ani Yoanda	Writer/director		
	Imperador Nero Vo Nimnno Caesar Patxai Romancho	Writer/director		
1940	Bhott Ailolo Pomburpechea Festak	Judge Gerald		
