= List of Hindi films of 1925 =

A list of films produced by the Bollywood film industry based in Mumbai in 1925:

== 1925 in Indian cinema ==
- The number of films rose from 11 in 1919, to 88 in 1925.
- Chandulal Shah started his directing career in films with Vimla for Laxmi Films. He directed two more films before moving to Kohinoor Film Company. He went on to form his own studios Ranjit Film Company (Ranjit Studios) in 1929.
- V. Shantaram, who started his career assisting Baburao Painter, made his acting debut as the main lead as the young village peasant in Savkari Pash.
- D. Billimoria (Dinshaw Billimoria) made his debut in a lead role in N. D. Sarpotdar's Chhatrapati Sambhaji.

=== Films ===
- Savkari Pash directed by Baburao Painter for Maharashtra Film Company, Kolhapur, was the acting debut of V. Shantaram. The film was the "earliest example" of parallel cinema in its realistic depiction of social issues.
- The Light of Asia was directed by Franz Osten with assistance from Himanshu Rai; it starred Rai in the role of Siddhartha (Buddha). The film was adapted from Edwin Arnold's epic poem The Light of Asia (1861).
- Kulin Kanta directed by Homi Master for Kohinoor Film Company was based on a real-life murder involving the Maharaja Tukoji Rao Holkar III of Indore and a dancing girl.
- Mojili Mumbai a.k.a. Slaves Of Luxury directed by Manilal Joshi was cited to be based on a real-life story of a cabaret dancer Roshanara, the film "sparked" a debate on "morality and cinematic realism".
- Mumbai Ni Mohini, also called Social Pirates, directed by Nanubhai Desai, was a real-life crime drama.

== A-F ==
Title	Director	Cast	Genre	Notes Cinematographer
Amarsinh Daggar a.k.a. Marwad's Moti	Bhagwati Prasad Mishra	Madanrai Vakil	Historical	Royal Art Studio
Anant Vrat	G. V. Sane	Bhaurao Datar, Krishna Chauhan	Mythology	Hindustan Cinema Film Co., Nasik; DOP: Anna Salunke
Baap Kamai a.k.a. Fortunes And Fools	Kanjibhai Rathod	Gulab, Gohar, Gangaram, Putlibai, Ermeline, Nandram	Social	Krishna Film Company; DOP: Chimanlal Luhar
Bajirao Mastani	Bhalji Pendharkar, Nanubhai B. Desai	Master Vithal, Yakub, Miss Jones, Nanasaheb Phatak, Sayani	Historical	Sharda Film Company; DOP: Bhogilal K. M. Dave
Bhadra Bhamini a.k.a. Test Of Chastity	Nanubhai B. Desai	Gulab, Nandram, P. R. Joshi, Prabhudas	Costume	Krishna Film Company; DOP: Chaturbhai Patel
Black Thief a.k.a. Kala Chor	Manilal Joshi	Raja Sandow, Zubeida, Janibabu, Putlibai	Costume	Laxmi Pictures; DOP: D. D. Dabke
Chalu Zamana a.k.a. Chalti Duniya				Krishna Film Company, Majestic Film Company
Chandrakant a.k.a. Filial Duty	Harshadrai Sakerlal Mehta	Ermeline, Nandram, Gulab, Haider Shah, Malika, Gangaram	Costume	Krishna Film Company; DOP: Chaturbhai Patel
Chandrarao More	N. D. Sarpotdar	Dwarki, P. Y. Altekar, Elizer, Baburao Pendharkar, D. N. Potdar	Historical	United Pictures Syndicate; DOP: Pandurang Talegiri
Charkha a.k.a. The Spinning Wheel a.k.a. Anath Abala	Kanjibhai Rathod	Ermeline, Madanrai Vakil	Social	Saurashtra Film Company, Rajkot; DOP: Chimanlal Luhar
Chhatrapati Sambhaji	N. D. Sarpotdar	D. Billimoria, P. Y. Altekar, Elizer, Jilloobai, Vedi	Historical	United Pictures Syndicate; DOP: Pandurang Talegiri
Child Widow a.k.a. Bal Vidhva	Behram Vasania	Harihar Diwana, Heera	Social	Kohinoor Film Company; DOP: Vishnu B. Joshi
Cinema Queen a.k.a. Cinema Ki Rani	Rajendra Raj Gaur	Mehtab, Master Bachoo, Mumtaz, Shivrani, Madhukar Gupte, Alaknanda, Nurjehan, Sadique, Shuklaji	Social	Vasant Films
Devadasi a.k.a. The Bride Of God	Manilal Joshi	Begum Fatma, Zubeida, Raja Sandow, Shahzadi, K. B. Athavale, Dabir, Prabhakar	Costume	Laxmi Pictures; DOP: D. D. Dabke
Devi Ahilyabai	Bhagwati Mishra		Historical Devotional	
Dream Of Life a.k.a. Sansar Swapna	Homi Master	Bachubhai, Khalil, Moti, Miss Marie	Social	Kohinoor Film Company; DOP: Gajanan S. Devare, K. G. Gokhale
Five Divine Wands a.k.a. Panchdanda	Chandulal Shah	Raja Sandow, Yakbal, Putli, Isdan, Ghory	Fantasy	Laxmi Pictures; DOP: D. D. Dabke
For Mother's Sake a.k.a. Matri Prem	M. D. Bhavnani	Moti, Raja Sandow	Social	Kohinoor Film Company

== G-K ==
Title	Director	Cast	Genre	Notes Cinematographer
Ghar Jamai a.k.a. Hen-pecked Husband	Homi Master	Gohar, Putlibai, Sidimiya	Social	Kohinoor Film Company; DOP: D. D. Dabke
Gaud Bangal a.k.a. Magicians Of Bengal a.k.a. Kamroo Deshni Kamini	K. P. Bhave	Fatma Begum, Elizer, Jilloobai, Madanrai Vakil		Royal Art Studio; DOP: Rustom Irani
Gul-E-Anar a.k.a. 1001 Nights			Fantasy	
Handsome Blackguard a.k.a. Fankdo Fituri	Homi Master	Homi Master, K.B. Athavale, Moti, Boman Behram, Fram Sethna, Miss Yakbal, Thelma Wallace, Yvonne Wallace	Costume	Kohinoor Film Company; DOP: D. D. Dabke
Hirji Kamdar	Homi Master	Khalil, Janibabu, Rajababu	Social	Kohinoor Film Company
Hothal Padmini	Harshadrai Mehta	Ermeline, Nandram, Gulab, Haider Shah, Malika, Gangaram	Costume	Krishna Film Company; DOP: Chaturbhai Patel
Indra Sabha a.k.a. The Royal Court Of Indra	Manilal Joshi	Zubeida, Raja Sandow, Sultana, K. B. Athavale, Khalil, Siddimiya	Fantasy	Kohinoor Film Company; DOP: D. D. Dabke
Jal Kumari a.k.a. Hoor-Al-Bahar	Harshadrai Mehta	Gulab, Vishnu, Gangaram	Fantasy	Krishna Film Company; DOP: Shree Nath Patankar
Jaler Meye a.k.a. The Girl In Prison a.k.a. Fisher Girl	Jyotish Bannerji	Durgadas Bannerjee, Kalidasi, A. K. Chakraborty, Kalidas Mukherjee	Social	Madan Theatres Ltd
Justice	Vedi	P. Y. Altekar	Social	Premier Photo Plays Co. DOP: Pandurang Talegiri
Kala Chor a.k.a. The Black Thief	Manilal Joshi	Raja Sandow, Zubeida, Janibabu, Putlibai	Costume	Laxmi Pictures; DOP: D. D. Dabke
Kali Nagin	Bhagwati Mishra	Jilloobai	Fantasy	Indian Pictures Corporation
Kamallata	Kanjibhai Rathod	Ermeline	Fantasy	Krishna Film Company; DOP: Chimanlal Luhar
Kangal Qaidi a.k.a. Doomed Soul	K. P. Bhave	Parshwanath Yeshwant Altekar, Miss Jainoo, Mohanlala, Dorabji Mevawala, Bhagwati Mishra	Social	Krishna Film Company, Majestic Film Company
Kashmiri Sundari		Patience Cooper, Mohammed Hussain, J. P. Howells	Social	Madan Theatres Ltd
Krishna Kumar a.k.a. Sacho Haqdar	Harshadrai Mehta	Gulab, Vishnu, Gangaram	Costume	Krishna Film Company; DOP: Chaturbhai Patel
Kulin Kanta	Homi Master	Miss Moti, Jamuna, Khalil, Boman Behram, Miss Yakbal, Janibabu, Behram Vasania	Social	Kohinoor Film Company; DOP: K. G. Gokhale
Kunj Vihari	Homi Master	Jamuna	Mythology	Kohinoor Film Company; DOP: Gajanan S. Devare

== L-R ==
Title	Director	Cast	Genre	Notes Cinematographer
Lalan Vanjari	Maneklal Patel	Ermeline, Gulab, Gangaram, Pranjivan	Legend	Krishna Film Company; DOP: Chaturbhai Patel
Lanka Ni Laadi a.k.a. Fairy Of Ceylon	Homi Master	Raja Sandow, Gohar, Jamuna, Khalil	Fantasy	Kohinoor Film Company; DOP: Gajanan S. Devare
Looking For Love a.k.a. Sanam Ni Shodma	M. M. Vaidya	Miss Mani, Gatubhai Vaidya, Dorothy, Maganlal Dave, Bhimbhai, Monghibai	Social	Saurashtra Film Co., Rajkot; DOP: Chimanlal Luhar
Mahatma Kabirdas	Raghupathy S. Prakasa		Devotional	Indian Art Craft Co., Madras; DOP: T. V. Rungiah Naidu
Maya Bazaar a.k.a. Vatsala Haran	Baburao Painter	V. Shantaram, Balasaheb Yadav, Kamladevi, Zunzharrao Pawar, Ganpat Bakre	Mythology	Maharashtra Film Co., Kolhapur S. Fattelal
Mewadpati Bappa Rawal			Historical	Eastern Film Company, Baroda
Mojili Mumbai a.k.a. Slaves Of Luxury	Manilal Joshi	Miss Yakbal, Raja Sandow, Jamuna, Janibabu, Moti, Noor Mohammed Charlie, Saraswati Devi	Crime Thriller	Kohinoor Film Company; DOP: D. D. Dabke
Mulraj Solanki	K. P. Bhave	Parshwanath Yeshwant Altekar, Jilloobai, Elizer, Madanrai Vakil	Historical	Patel Brothers, Royal Art Studio; DOP: Rustom Irani
My Wife a.k.a. Mari Dhaniyani	Homi Master	Miss Moti, Jamuna, Khalil, Siddimiya	Social	Kohinoor Film Company; DOP: K. G. Gokhale
Naval Sha Hirjee			Legend	Krishna Film Company
Noor-E-Deccan a.k.a. Light Of The Deccan	Bhagwati Mishra	Khalil, Gohar, Jillobai	Historical	Indian Pictures Corporation
Pampered Youth a.k.a. Adooray Chheley	J.J. Madan	Patience Cooper, Surajram, Sharifa	Social	Madan Theatres Ltd.
Prabhavati	N. D. Sarpotdar	P. Y. Altekar	Historical	Deccan Pictures Corporation; DOP: Pandurang Talegiri
Premanjali a.k.a. An Offering Of Love	Jyotish Bannerji	Durgadas Bannerjee, Ahindra Choudhary, A. K. Chakraborty, Kalidas Mukherjee	Social	Madan Theatres Ltd
Ra Navghan a.k.a. Raj Bhakti a.k.a. Vir Pasali	Nagendra Majumdar	Zubeida, Jilloobai, Madanrai Vakil, Elizer	Historical	Royal Art Studio
Raja Yogi a.k.a. The Prince Ascetic	Manilal Joshi	Raja Sandow, Jamuna, Miss Moti, Noor Mohammed Charlie, Miss Yakbal	Historical	Kohinoor Film Company; DOP: D. D. Dabke
Rambha Of Rajnagar a.k.a. Amdawad Ni Sethani	Homi Master	Zubeida, Khalil, Noor Mohammed Charlie, Miss Yakbal	Social	Kohinoor Film Company
Rana Hamir a.k.a. Samrat Hamir	Baburao Painter	V. Shantaram, Balasaheb Yadav, Kamladevi, Zunzharrao Pawar, Ansuyabai, Sushiladevi	Historical	Maharashtra Film Co., Kolhapur; DOP: S. Fattelal
Rana Pratap	Bhagwati Mishra		Historical	Patel Bros, Royal Art Studio

== S ==
Title	Director	Cast	Genre	Notes Cinematographer
Syamantaka Mani a.k.a. Krishna Under Charge Of Theft	Dadasaheb Phalke	Bhaurao Datar, Krishna Chauhan	Mythology	Hindustan Cinema Film Co. Anna Salunke
Sansar Chakra a.k.a. Pehla Pyar		Patience Cooper, Sharifa, Surajram, Dadibhai Sarkari	Social	Madan Theatres Ltd.
Sant Janabai	G.V. Sane	Vasant Shinde, Madhav Khaire, Bhaurao Datar	Devotional	Hindustan Cinema Film Company, Nasik
Sati Laxmi a.k.a. Pious Laxmi	Jyotish Bannerjee	Patience Cooper, Dhiraj Bhattacharya, Manmotha Paul, Kunjalal Chakraborty, Kartik Dey, Shishubala, Shashimukhi, Manorama	Devotional	Madan Theatres Ltd; DOP: Jatin Das
Sati Sreemantini			Mythology	Lakshmi Chitram
Sati Tara a.k.a. War Between Vali And Sugriva a.k.a. Vali Sugriva Yudh	Shinde	Bhaurao Datar, Tatyaba Shelar, Krishna Chauhan	Mythology	Hindustan Cinema Film Company, Nasik; DOP: Telang
Savkari Pash a.k.a. Indian Shylock	Baburao Painter	V. Shantaram, Balasaheb Yadav, Kamladevi, Zunzharrao Pawar, Bakre, Keshavrao Dhaiber, Shankarrao Bhute	Social	Maharashtra Film Co., Kolhapur; DOP S. Fattelal
Search For Pandavs a.k.a. Pandav Shodh	G. V. Sane		Mythology	Hindustan Cinema Film Co., Nasik; DOP: Anna Salunke
Seth Sagalsha a.k.a. Wealth And The World	Mohan Dayaram Bhavnani	Jamuna	Legend	Kohinoor Film Company
Shahala Shah a.k.a. Check To The King	Baburao Painter	V. Shantaram, Balasaheb Yadav, Kamladevi, Zunzharrao Pawar, Ganpat Bakre,	Social	Maharashtra Film Company, Kolhapur S. Fattelal
Shanker Lila			Religious	Hindustan Cinema Film Company, Nasik
Shanta			Social	Madan Theatres Ltd.
Shri Vatsa Chinta	Bhagwati Mishra		Mythology	Indian Pictures Corporation
Social Pirates a.k.a. Mumbai Ni Mohini a.k.a. Night Side Of Bombay	Nanubhai Desai	Fatma Begum, Mohanlala, Elizer, Dorabji Mevawala	crime Drama	Saraswati Film; DOP: Bhogilal K. M. Dave
Sultaness Of Love			Costume	Patel Brothers
Suvarna	Manilal Joshi	Raja Sandow, Putli		Laxmi Pictures; DOP: D. D. Dabke

== T-Z ==
Title	Director	Cast	Genre	Notes Cinematographer
The Divine Punishment a.k.a. Deshna Dushman a.k.a. Rangilo Rajvi	Manilal Joshi	Zubeida, Raja Sandow, Miss Yakbal, Miss Moti, K. Athavale, Noor Mohammed Charlie, Bachu, R. N. Vaidya,	Costume	Imperial Film Company, Kohinoor Film Company. DOP: D. D. Dabke
The Exiled Prince a.k.a. Ujaint Kumar	Bhagwati Mishra	Jilloobai		Indian Pictures Corpn.
The Noble Scamp a.k.a. Khandani Khavis	Manilal Joshi	Raja Sandow, Zubeida, Baba Vyas, R. A. D. Chowdhary	Costume	Laxmi Pictures; DOP: D. D. Dabke
Turki Hoor a.k.a. Beauty Of A Turkey Girl	J. J. Madan	Patience Cooper, Master Mohan, Surajram, Sarifa, Manilal	Social	Madan Theatres Ltd.
Two Untouchables a.k.a. Dherni Chokri	N. D. Sarpotdar	Parshwanathy Yeshwant Altekar, Joshi, Miss Jones, Dattoba Rajwade	Social	United Pictures Syndicate; DOP: Pandurang Talegiri
Veer Bala a.k.a. Brave Girl	M. D. Bhavnani	Sulochana, Khalil, Noor Mohammed Charlie	Costume	Kohinoor Film Co. DOP: Vishnu B. Joshi
Verni Vasulat a.k.a. Sweet Revenge	Harshadrai Mehta	Damania, Durga, Haridas, Pranjivan	Social	Krishna Film Company
Vimla a.k.a. Mother India	Chandulal Shah, D. D. Dabke	Raja Sandow, Putli	Social	Laxmi Pictures; DOP: D. D. Dabke
Yashodevi a.k.a. Sacrifice	Nagendra Majumdar	Zubeida, Madanrai Vakil	Historical	Royal Art Studio; DOP: Rustom Irani
