= Sairandhri (disambiguation) =

Sairandhri is the pseudonym assumed by Draupadi, in the ancient Indian epic Mahabharata, during her incognito.

It may also refer to:

- Sairandhri (1920 film), an Indian Hindi-language film
- Sairandhri (1933 film), an Indian Marathi and Hindi-language film
- The primary entrance location of Silent Valley National Park in Kerala, India

== See also ==
- Draupadi (disambiguation)
