= Draupadi (disambiguation) =

Draupadi is a character in the Hindu epic Mahabharata.

Daupadi, Draupathi, or Droupadi may also refer to:

== Entertainment ==
- Draupadi (1931 film), a 1931 Indian film
- Draupadi (TV series), an Indian television mythological series
- Draupathi (2020 film), a 2020 Indian film

== People with the name ==
- Draupadi Ghimiray, Indian social activist
- Draupadi Murmu (born 1958), Indian politician and 15th President of India

== See also ==
- Draupadi Vastrapaharanam (disambiguation)
- Sairandhri (disambiguation), another name of Draupadi
- Draupada, character in the Mahabharata
