= Mestri =

Mestri may refer to:

== People ==
- Mestri (community), or Kutch Gurjar Kshatriya, an artisan community of India

=== Surname ===
- Alex Mestri (1910–1999), Indian violinist and composer
- Guido del Mestri (1911–1993), Italian cardinal of the Roman Catholic Church
- Baburao Painter (Baburao Krishnarao Mestri) (1890–1954), Indian film director

== Other uses ==
- Mestri (film), a 2009 Telugu action film

== See also ==
- Mistry (disambiguation)
