= Muraliwala =

1927 Indian silent film

- Directed by: Baburao Painter
- Release date: 1927
- Running time: 45 minutes
- Country: India
- Language: Silent film

Muraliwala is a 1927 Indian silent film directed by Baburao Painter. Drawn from the stories of the Hindu deity Krishna, it is among the few surviving Indian silent films, and a print is held by the National Film Archive of India (NFAI). The film was restored under the National Film Heritage Mission and has been shown with newly composed live scores, in Australia in 2023 and at the International Film Festival of India (IFFI) in 2025.

== Synopsis ==
Set in the village of Brindavan, the film follows the childhood of Krishna as he plays pranks and causes mischief, and Radha, whose devotion gives way to confusion when she is confronted with Krishna's true nature.

== Restoration and screenings ==
Muraliwala was restored under the National Film Heritage Mission, the preservation programme that the Ministry of Information and Broadcasting launched in 2016, and was included in a package of 18 restored classics presented by the National Film Development Corporation (NFDC) and the NFAI.

On 12 March 2023 the film was screened outdoors at ACMI and Fed Square in Melbourne, with a contemporary score performed live by Hari Sivanesan and a South Asian music ensemble.

At the 56th IFFI in November 2025 the film was shown with a reconstructed score performed live under the composer Rahul Ranade. The NFDC managing director, Prakash Magdum, said the screening aimed to revive the silent-film experience for a new generation, and two of Baburao Painter's daughters were in the audience.
