= J. R. Fithna =

Goan theatre actor and female impersonator

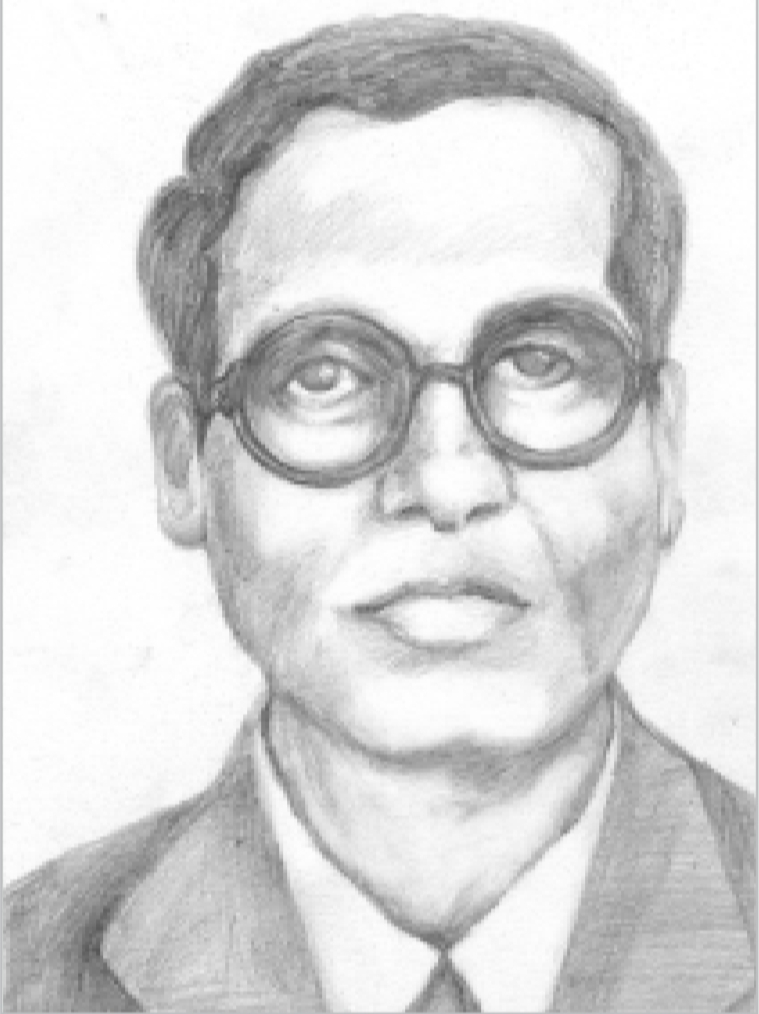
- Portrait of Fernandes
- Born: Raia, Goa, Portuguese India
- Died: (aged 80); Bombay (now Mumbai, India)
- Occupations: Actor; singer; composer; female impersonator
- Era: Golden phase of tiatr

J. R. Fernandes, known professionally as, J. R. Fithna, was a Goan theatre actor, singer, composer, and female impersonator who worked on the Konkani stage during the golden phase of tiatr. (Note: The golden phase of tiatr lasted from the 1930s to the 1970s. However, there is no information regarding the years Fernandes was active or flourished. According to the available sources, Fernandes's first documented performance was in Saib Rocha's translated tiatr Romeo & Juliet (1935).)

== Career ==
Fernandes made his initial foray onto the theatrical stage in a tiatr (a form of Goan musical theatre) produced by Saib Rocha. In this production, Fernandes assumed the role of a lady in Rocha's Konkani adaptation of Shakespeare's Romeo and Juliet, alongside Miss Carlota and J. P. Souzalin as the main protagonists. His portrayal of the female character garnered acclaim. Playwright and politician Tomazinho Cardozo noted Fernandes's ability to emulate the demeanor and speech patterns of a woman, which earned him praise from the audience. The success of this performance led to various tiatr directors of the time approaching Fernandes to participate in their productions. Driven by his aspiration to achieve success in the Konkani stage, Fernandes embraced every role and opportunity that came his way. Tiatrists such as J. P. Souzalin, C. Alvares, Jacinto Vaz, and Souza Ferrao recognized his skills and entrusted him with significant roles in their respective tiatrs. Capitalizing on these opportunities, Fernandes emerged as one of the prominent tiatrists of his era, writes Cardozo.

In addition to his acting prowess, Fernandes demonstrated his aptitude as a composer and singer. He composed his own lyrical compositions. Cardozo described his songs as praiseworthy and highlighted Fernandes's distinctive singing style, which captivated and entertained the tiatr audiences. As a result, Fernandes swiftly gained popularity, becoming a favorite among tiatr enthusiasts in Bombay and Goa. As time progressed and Fernandes aged, he transitioned from playing lead female roles to character roles. His portrayal of elderly women was particularly noteworthy, leading directors to prefer casting him in such roles. Fernandes displayed meticulous attention to detail, investing effort in comprehending the intricacies of each character assigned to him, including their mannerisms and attire. When dressed for a female role, his transformation was so convincing that his male identity remained undetectable to the audience. Cardozo writes, through his versatility, Fernandes forged a successful career in tiatr, earning acclaim as a character actor in his later career, such as his ability to embody roles such as a mother, elder sister, and elderly woman, leaving an impression on the audience.

In the course of his career, Fernandes had made noted contributions in the realm of tiatrs. Among his accomplishments are his appearances in J. P. Souzalin's productions, namely Bhott Ailolo Pomburpechea Festak (Hindu priest's arrival at Pomburpa's feast) and Tiklem Cheddum (The girl born after three consecutive boys), which garnered him recognition. Equally deserving of mention are his portrayals in C. Alvares' works, such as Are Puzadkara, Mhoji Vonim (My Sister-in-law), and Mog Cazar ani Doth (Love, Marriage and Dowry). Moreover, Fernandes earned accolades for his memorable leading role in Jacinto Vaz's tiatr, Ghorwali (Housewife). In regards to his versatility, Fernandes frequently displayed his talent by assuming the roles of elderly women in numerous dramas. However, as the effects of old age took their toll, his vocal abilities began to wane. Consequently, he made the decision to retire from the tiatr stage, bidding farewell to his career at the age of 70. Preferring not to subject himself to the challenges associated with performing at an advanced age, Fernandes resolved to step away from the limelight. Nevertheless, he occasionally made appearances on stage, particularly at the persistent urging of C. Alvares, whom he did not wish to disappoint. Thus, in deference to Alvares' persuasion, Fernandes reluctantly obliged, despite his personal reservations.

== Personal life ==
J. R. Fernandes hailed from the village of Raia, Goa which was part of Portuguese India during the Portuguese Empire (now in India). During his formative years, Fernandes developed an ardent fascination for tiatr, nurturing a profound desire to grace its stage one day. Konkani playwright and politician Tomazinho Cardozo attested to Fernandes natural aptitude for the art of tiatr, evident from his early childhood. As a young child, he diligently attended every tiatr performance, displaying a devotion to this theatrical tradition. Fortuitously, Fernandes had the privilege of collaborating with popular artistes of the Konkani stage during his youth. His documented debut in tiatr occurred in the production Romeo & Juliet by Konkani director Saib Rocha. Succumbing to the passage of time, Fernandes died in Bombay (now Mumbai) at the age of 80. Cardozo poignantly lamented the demise of Fernandes, likening it to the fading of a resplendent rose in the waters of the Konkani stage.

== Style and reception ==
Konkani Historian Wilson Mazarello writes, Fernandes was an accomplished artist known for his talent and captivating performances, particularly in female roles. Writer Fausto V. da Costa states, Fernandes' physical appearance lent itself beautifully to these characters, exuding grace and charm. Fernandes displayed an ability to seamlessly transition into various roles, effortlessly embodying princesses, wicked girls, sweethearts, strong-willed village belles, simple ladies, and even portraying aunts with equal ease. In addition to his versatility, Fernandes was recognized as one of the most experienced tiatrists, demonstrating maturity and depth in his craft.

Playwright Tomazinho Cardozo writes, one of Fernandes's attributes was his commitment to his art. Prior to taking the stage, he would diligently research and study each character, ensuring a thorough understanding and a nuanced portrayal. This level of professionalism and dedication made him an exemplar for aspiring female impersonators. Fernandes was known for his willingness to go to great lengths to perfect his performances, such as getting his ears pierced to wear earrings, attesting to his attention to detail. Throughout his career, Fernandes left an mark as a multifaceted performer, impressing audiences with his sensitive and authentic portrayals. He was always prepared to put in the effort to perfect his portrayal of a female character on stage.

== Selected stage works ==
Year	Title	Role	Notes	Ref
1935	Romeo and Juliet	Lady	Professional debut	
1940	Bhott Ailolo Pomburpechea Festak			
	Tiklem Cheddum			
	Are Puzadkara, Mhoji Vonim			
	Mog Cazar ani Doth			
	Ghorwali	Leading role		
