= Alex Mestri =

Indian musician and composer (1910–1999)

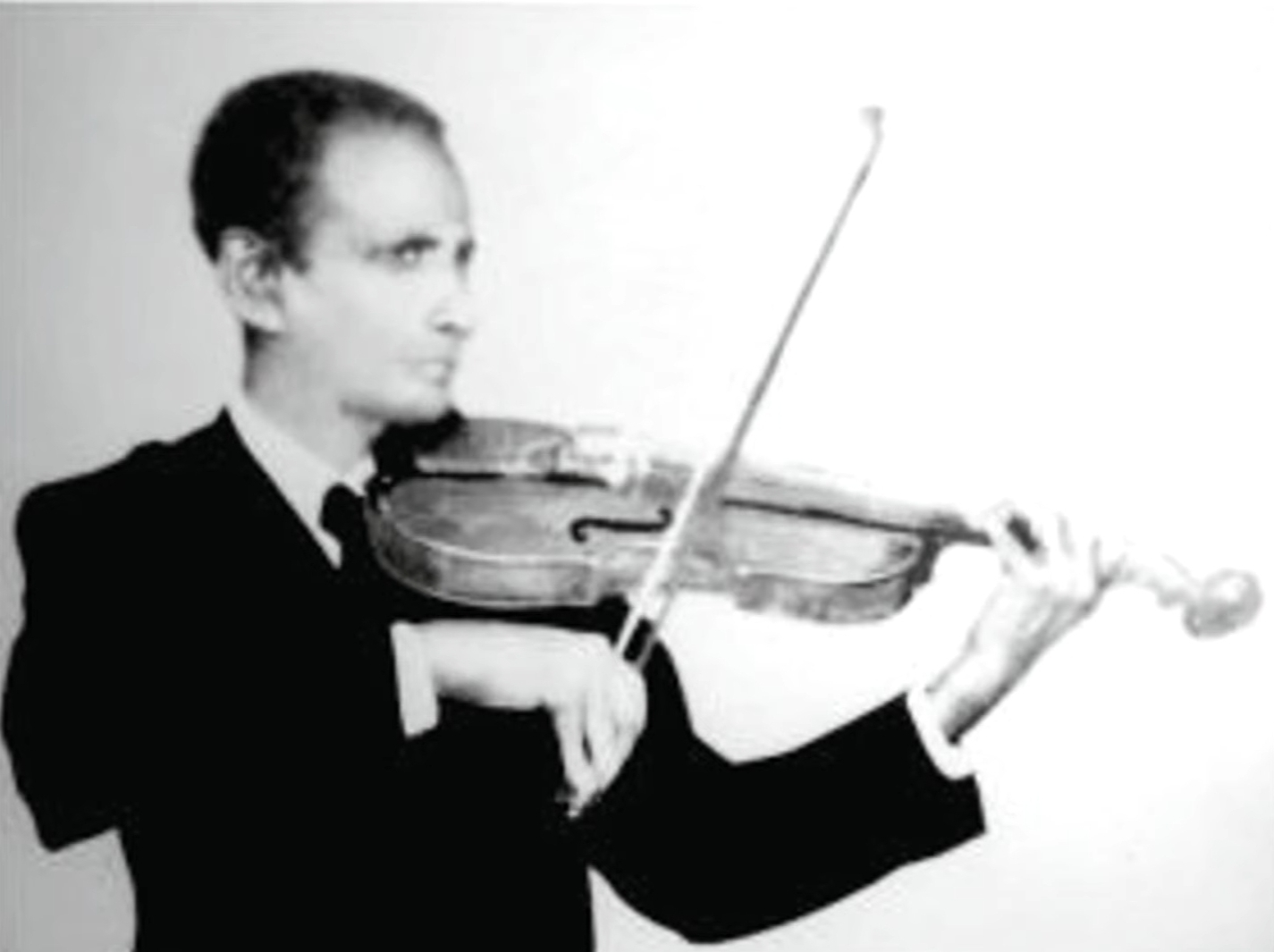
- Fernandes playing his violin
- Born: Aleixo Piedade Fernandes; 10 January 1910; Margão, Goa, Portuguese India, Portuguese Empire (now in India)
- Died: 30 August 1999 (aged 89); Margao, Goa, India
- Other name: Alex Piedade Fernandes
- Education: Premeiro Grau (Portuguese)
- Alma mater: Loyola High School
- Occupations: Musician; composer; violinist; bandleader; music director
- Years active: 1930–1960s
- Spouse: Felecidade Fernandes (m. 1944)
- Children: 5

Aleixo Piedade Fernandes (10 January 1910 – 30 August 1999), professionally known as Alex Mestri, was an Indian musician, composer, violinist, bandleader, and music director who worked on the Konkani stage.

== Early life ==
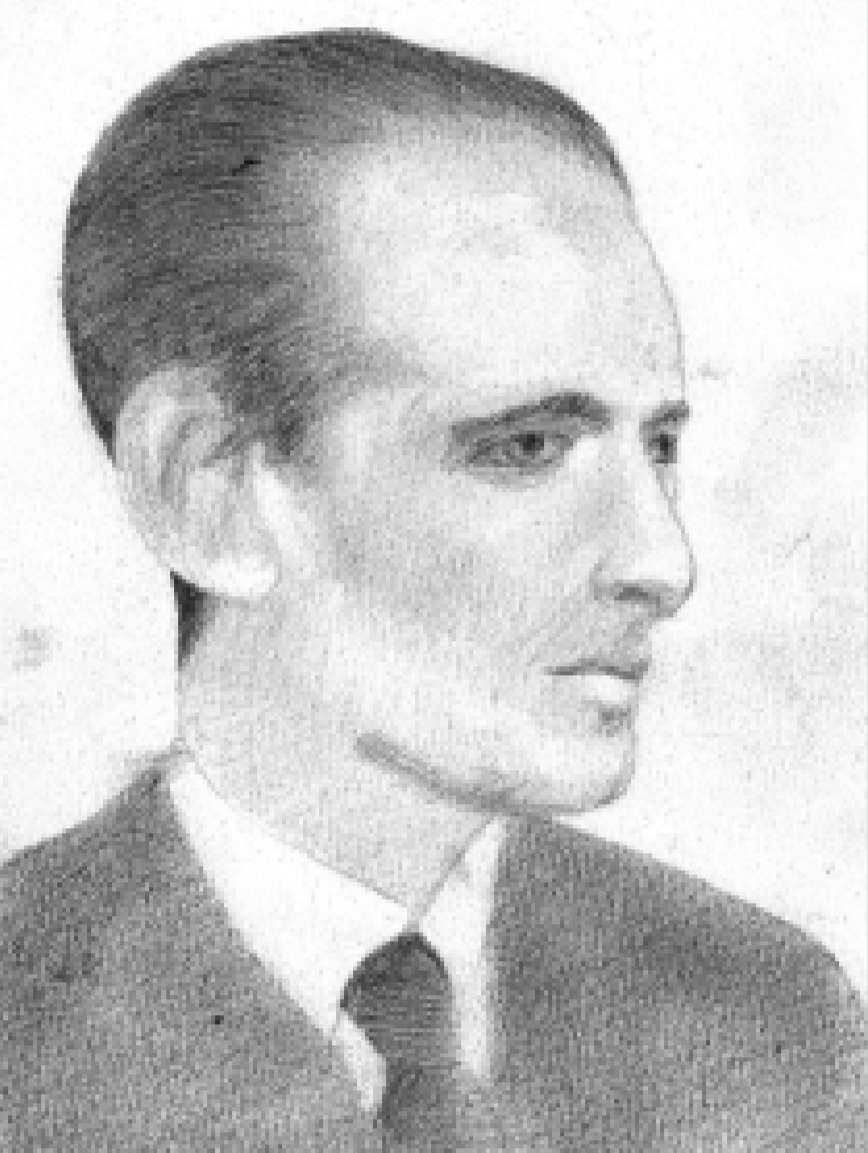
Fernandes during his youth

Aleixo Piedade Fernandes was born on 10 January 1910, in Margão, Goa, which was a part of Portuguese India during the era of the Portuguese Empire. He was born into a Goan Catholic family. Fernandes was the son of day laborers Pedro Rosario and Joaquina Fernandes, who hailed from Navelim. He finished his initial undergraduate studies, referred to as "Premeiro Grau" in Portuguese. Additionally, he pursued English education up to the seventh grade at Union High School in Margão, now called Loyola High School. From an early age of 14, Fernandes exhibited an interest in music, dedicating himself to the study of musical composition, notation, and violin performance. His strong affinity for tiatr, a distinctive form of Goan musical theater, fueled his aspiration to compose music specifically for this genre. Encouraged by his father, Fernandes embarked on a musical journey that would shape his career.

== Career ==
Prior to his tenure as a composer for tiatrs, Fernandes initiated his musical journey by establishing a musical ensemble known as "Alex and his Jolly Boys Orchestra" in 1930, when he was merely 20 years old. The band flourished during its early days, gaining recognition for its performances at weddings, dances, and eventually becoming an integral part of the tiatr scene for two decades. Consisting of five musicians, including João Rodrigues on the trumpet, hailing from Quelossim, Bernard Fernandes on the saxophone and trumpet, hailing from Cortalim, Cheddo on drums, hailing from Maddel Grande in Margão, and Joaquim Silva on the banjo, who hailed from Borda, Goa, the musical group eventually dissolved, prompting Fernandes to gather a new set of members to form a fresh lineup. The subsequent iteration of the band saw the inclusion of Raia-based Gaspar, John Carvalho, Paixão hailing from Nuvem, Jack Minguel based in Fatorda and Piedade Santan from Colva. Fernandes, who had prior employment at a school in Nuvem and used to commute by bicycle, chose to resign from his teaching position to focus on his musical performances at weddings, dances, and tiatrs. The demand for his band was such that they were consistently booked well in advance throughout the year. In response to this high demand, Fernandes expanded the ensemble to comprise a total of twelve musicians. In cases of conflicting schedules, he would strategically divide the band into two groups, ensuring that one group of six members could entertain guests at one event while the other group of six members performed at a separate venue. Fernandes established himself as a popular musician, becoming sought after for his musical services during that period. Whether it was weddings, dances, or tiatrs, his musical abilities made him a sought-after figure. The Navhind Times lauded Fernandes as a musician, underscoring his popularity in the realms of weddings, dances, and tiatrs.

Fernandes demonstrated a strong enthusiasm for singing and acting, which was prominently displayed in his participation in local village tiatrs. He had the opportunity to showcase his musical talents through his involvement in theatrical performances that took place during festive occasions and important events, where he performed alongside local village boys. The Konkani actor and playwright, A. R. Souza Ferrão, played a pivotal role in guiding Fernandes into the realm of commercial tiatrs as a musician. Initially, Fernandes received a modest compensation of ₹20 (equivalent to ₹2,200 or US$23 in 2023) for his musical contributions, a sum that was later augmented to ₹25 (equivalent to ₹2,800 or US$29 in 2023). Over time, he became a sought-after composer, collaborating with directors of the era such as Saib Rocha, A. R. Souza Ferrão, and C. Alvares, among others. In 1958, Fernandes embarked on an African tour alongside his band and a tiatr troupe that included figures like Konkani comedian Jacinto Vaz, A. R. Souza Ferrão, Remmie Colaço, Anthony De Sa, Dioguinho D'Mello, Rico Rod, Aristides Dias, Lucian Dias, and Young Menezes. This journey encompassed 25 shows across diverse locations including Portuguese Angola, Dar es Salaam in the Tanganyika Territory, Kampala in the Protectorate of Uganda, Nairobi, Mombasa, Nakuru in Kenya Colony, and various others. Fernandes' musical contributions were not limited to his native Goa; he also lent his talents to tiatrs in Bombay, Poona, Karwar, Mangalore, and Belgaum, thereby expanding his artistic reach.

Fernandes was a popular figure within the realm of tiatr, a form of Goan musical theater. Among his band members was Francisco Antonio, also known as Frans Anton, who initiated his drumming career in tiatrs when he was merely 15 years old, performing alongside Fernandes and other band members. Fernandes significantly enriched the tiatr community by assuming the role of a music director for various productions spanning the decades of the 1940s, 1950s, and 1960s. He gained acclaim within the tiatr community for his musical prowess, earning admiration from fellow artists. His compositions, known as kantaram (Konkani songs), played an indispensable role in tiatr performances, to the extent that staging a tiatr without Fernandes' music would be inconceivable. Before venturing into the tiatr industry, Fernandes showcased his musical talent as a choirmaster at the Nuvem church for close to ten years, highlighting his expertise in music. Furthermore, he offered his expertise in arranging music for the Trio Kings, a political trio comprising Joaquim-Jr. Rod-Anthony, showcasing his versatility in musical composition. Anthony, a former member of the trio Anthony-Nelson-Conception, was tasked with composing all the songs for the group.

== Personal life ==
Fernandes at the age of 34, married Felecidade Fernandes, a homemaker from Nuvem, Goa, on 21 January 1944. Their civil marriage registration was conducted in Margão, Goa. The couple had a total of five children: three sons named Agnelo (born 1947), Pio (born 1951), and Edviges (born 1944), as well as two daughters named Agnela (born 1946) and Maria (born 1949). Fernandes, originally from the Maddel Grande locality in Margão, worked as a music teacher in a school located in Nuvem. In a different anecdote, prior to embarking on his musical career, Fernandes held the position of choirmaster at the Nuvem church for a decade, as confirmed by Jose Alexandre Rodrigues, the member secretary of the Tiatr Academy of Goa. Fernandes frequently traveled to his place of work using a bicycle. Driven by his passion for music, he eventually decided to leave his teaching position to pursue a professional career as a musician, specializing in performing at weddings, dances, and tiatrs.

On 30 August 1999, Fernandes died at his residence at Madel, Margao, aged 89.
