= Saib Rocha =

Indian playwright and theatre director (1898–1972)

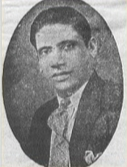
- Portrait of Rocha during his youth
- Born: Domingos José Rocha; 23 August 1898; Oxel, Goa, Portuguese India
- Died: 28 April 1972 (aged 73); Goa, India
- Other names: A. J. Rocha
- Citizenship: India (from 1961)
- Occupations: Playwright; theatre director; actor
- Years active: 1916–1960s
- Spouse: Ermelinda Cardozo

Domingos José "Saib" Rocha (23 August 1898 – 28 April 1972), also known as A. J. Rocha, was an Indian playwright, theatre director, and actor known for his work in tiatr productions. Referred to as the "Lion of the Konkani stage", Rocha was a leading Konkani theatre practitioner from 1916 to 1941. One of the greatest Konkani playwrights and directors, he founded the Union Jack Dramatic Company, six years after being influenced by the tiatr production Maurice and Juliana vo A Real Love Story (1910) by Rama.

== Career ==
During the early stages of the Konkani tiatr, a form of Goan theatrical entertainment, the field encountered challenges. Numerous Konkani drama companies emerged and disbanded at a similar frequency, reflecting the unstable nature of the art form. However, the arrival of Rocha marked a turning point in the history of Konkani tiatr, as noted by Wilson Mazarello, a Konkani historian and singer. Rocha's presence on the Konkani tiatr scene proved to be a crucial milestone, providing a much-needed boost to the struggling state of this Goan entertainment tradition. Rocha's entrance into the Konkani tiatr arena coincided with a critical juncture when João Agostinho Fernandes was grappling to steer the Konkani tiatr in the right direction. The Konkani tiatr faced numerous challenges during this period, including petty politics, vulgarity, unhealthy criticism, and jealousy. These factors posed a threat to the integrity of the Konkani tiatr and its adherence to the noble standards set by Lucasinho Ribeiro, known as the originator of Konkani tiatr.

Rocha's interest in the Konkani tiatr was sparked during his stay in Bombay in 1910, where he had the opportunity to witness several Konkani tiatrs written and directed by figures such as L.C.D. Braganza (also known as Rama), Douglas Fernandes, Sebastiao Gabriel D'Souza (alias Karachiwala), Lucasinho Ribeiro, and Rogaciano D'Souza. These experiences left a profound impact on Rocha, igniting his passion for writing and directing Konkani tiatrs. With his solid academic background, proficiency in English, and a natural affinity for the Konkani stage, Rocha embarked on his ambitious endeavor. Rocha initiated the creation of his first Konkani tiatr, titled Zenoveva de Brabão. However, in the midst of this undertaking, Rocha received a job offer in Basrah, compelling him to temporarily depart from Bombay. While in the Gulf, the outbreak of the First World War prompted Rocha's return to Bombay.

Upon his return, Rocha resumed his work on the script and successfully completed it in 1916. To bring his vision to life, Rocha meticulously selected an ensemble of actors and actresses. He formed the Union Jack Dramatic Company, which served as the platform for staging his tiatr. Comprising 32 members, the Union Jack Dramatic Company included founding actors such as Emidio Sailor, C. Carneiro, Jose Pereira Mittaiwalli, Simon Alphonso, S. Dias, J. Afonso, Luis Borges, Alphonso Pako, Chikin, Luis Alphonso, Altos, Duarte Hara, Santan Fernandes, D'Costa Eddie, Thomas Fernandes, Babu Hilario, Victor, Peter Peres Bomboincar, Elzara, C. D'Souza, A. Peres Bombilkar, Johnie Bartle, Patrick Fireman, and D'Costa Midas.

The Union Jack Dramatic Company faced its fair share of challenges during its establishment, while Rocha, its leader, sought stability. In 1931, internal conflicts arose between Emidio Salilor and Luis Borges, two popular composers and singers of the theatrical company, resulting in the departure of some members. However, Rocha promptly replenished the group with new members, including Anthony Vaz, J. R. Fithna, Anthony Tulu, M. C. Correia, J. P. Souzalin, Souza Ferrão, Franco, C. Brazil, Manny Luis, and B. Vaz. This resurgence propelled the Union Jack Dramatic Company forward with renewed enthusiasm. Rocha, a firm advocate of discipline, commanded the respect of his colleagues, who bestowed upon him the title "Saib Rocha" out of admiration, despite his preference for the simpler moniker A.J. Rocha. Throughout his career, Rocha authored and produced approximately 60–62 original Konkani tiatrs between 1916 and 1941.

As a student of drama, Rocha developed a particular affinity for the works of William Shakespeare. In 1935, he undertook the translation and production of Romeo and Juliet in the Konkani language. Rocha extensively toured with the Union Jack Dramatic Company, leaving an imprint on various locales. Portuguese newspapers of the time documented the troupe's visit to Goa in 1926, where they staged tiatrs at the Eden Cinema Theatre in Pangim (later known as Cine National) and the Clube Harmonia Hall in Borda, Goa. Having already established their reputation in Bombay, they were warmly received in Goa, garnering substantial coverage in local newspapers. Consequently, the group was compelled to host repeat performances in both Pangim and Margão in 1927. While Rocha occasionally assumed acting roles in his tiatrs, his primary focus lay in directing. Notable appearances include his involvement in Jinnu's Imperador Carlos Magno Ani Bara Par Fransache, presented by the Union Jack Dramatic Company at the Princess Theatre Bhangwadi, Bombay on 3 December 1929, and Carcus Sailor Boy's White Rose Garden Vo Dhovea Gulabachi Bag in 1934. Rocha dedicated himself to the Konkani stage with an open mindset and progressive ideas, recognizing the distinct roles of playwriting, directing, and acting within the realm of theater.

Among Rocha's most popular tiatrs, which he both authored and directed, are Dubavi Ghorcarn (The Doubtful Wife), Noketr Italia Xarachem (The star of the city of Italy), Gupit Cazar (Secret Marriage), Mog ani Krim, Calsad Nouro, Ghor-Zanvoim (Gharjamai), Son of Jeruzalem, Aunkarancho Sounsar, and Romeo & Juliet. Significant performances include the staging of Rocha's own tiatr Doth (Dowry) at the Princess Theatre Bhangwadi on 14 April 1931, which marked the debut of actress Miss Georgina Souza. Mea Culpa (My Fault) was presented at the Victoria Theatre in Byculla, Bombay, on 17 November 1931, followed by Mr. Bardez ani Mr. Salcete at the Princess Theatre Bhangwadi on 2 December 1932. Existing records indicate that Rocha's tiatr First Prize was performed by Souza Ferrão in Navelim, Goa, on 16 November 1932. After a brief stint in Karachi, Rocha returned to Bombay in 1934 and showcased Share Holders Night at the Royal Opera House on 8 April. This particular tiatr garnered attention from dignitaries, including His Excellency, The Counsel of Persia. On 10 June 1934, Rocha presented Son of Jeruzalem at the Royal Opera House, followed by Visronk Dukh-Khont on 3 December 1934. A revival of Son of Jeruzalem took place at the Princess Theatre Bhangwadi on 11 January 1948.

On 25 December 1935, Rocha presented his play Dubavi Ghorcarn at the Royal Opera House in Bombay, followed by a repeat performance at the Baliwala Theatre in Grant Road, Bombay on 22 April 1946. Subsequently, on 25 February 1936, he staged Addangi Choli ani Patrador Cholo, and on 18 May 1936, he showcased Dona Enestina vo Sounsar Jiklim Hanv at the Princess Theatre in Bhangwadi, Bombay. Rocha had previously staged another play, titled Ek Oklek Teg Noure (The bride with three bridegrooms), at the same theatre in 1935. Continuing his creative endeavors, on 4 October 1944, he organized the production of Sezareachim Kizilam at St. Xavier's College Hall in Dhobitalao, Bombay. Rocha consistently demonstrated a prolific output, producing an average of two new tiatrs each year, with each production undergoing approximately six months of rehearsals. Known for their educational value and high artistic standards, Rocha's tiatrs garnered recognition for their quality performances.

Despite encountering skepticism and criticism from the elite Goan community in Bombay, Rocha tenaciously pursued his mission of elevating the standards of Konkani theater. He maintained a dedication to his craft, even during periods of discouragement resulting from relatively low audience turnout, writes Mazarello. In line with other prominent figures in the field, Rocha also made significant efforts to promote female participation in performances. Alongside his wife Ermeline, he introduced Miss Georgina in Doth in 1931 and again in 1934, followed by the introduction of Miss Carlota in his tiatr Son of Jeruzalem in 1934. Additionally, Rocha featured his wife Ermeline in several of his tiatrs. Mazarello further writes, some aspects of Rocha's productions included the elaborate and visually stunning sets, as well as the meticulous direction employed. Rocha's dedication to his craft extended beyond Bombay, as he embarked on tours with his troupe, performing in various cities such as Karachi, Calcutta, Poona, and Goa.

Even in his later years, Rocha's passion for dramatic arts remained undiminished. When approached by contractors seeking to restage his tiatr Mog Ani Krim, Rocha enlisted the directorial expertise of Remmie Colaço. The play was subsequently performed at Victoria Gardens in Byculla, Bombay on 3 November 1963. Similarly, Rocha's Ghor Zanvoim was restaged under the direction of Alfred Rose at St. Mary's Hall in Mazagaon, Bombay on 15 August 1964. During his time in Goa, Rocha collaborated with M. Dod de Verna to stage his tiatrs Dubhavi Ghorcarn, resulting in several performances of the play held in Goa in May 1966, featuring the Young Stars of Goa troupe. Despite health concerns limiting his ability to write new tiatrs, Rocha maintained an enthusiastic spirit and entrusted his plays to various contractors and emerging directors such as Remmie Colaco, Alfred Rose, and Dod de Verna. Konkani historian, Wilson Mazarello, acknowledges Rocha as a missionary figure whose contributions to Konkani tiatr and its artists are of utmost significance.

== Personal life ==
Domingos José Rocha was born on 23 August 1898, in Vagalim, Oxel, Goa, which was then part of Portuguese India during the Portuguese Empire. He was widely known by his stage name, A. J. Rocha, although he was commonly referred to with respect as Saib Rocha, with "Saib" originating from the term "Sahib". Rocha's father was Minguel Salvador da Rocha, and his mother was Escolastica de Souza. Rocha married Ermelinda Cardozo, who was known by her stage name Sudhabala. Ermelinda was a highly acclaimed dancer of her time and a distinguished artist in Hindi films. She also made appearances in tiatrs, a traditional form of Goan musical theater. Rocha distinguished himself among his contemporaries as a playwright and director with a deep passion for literature. He was an avid reader and regularly engaged with local newspapers and magazines such as Time and the former The Illustrated Weekly of India. Rocha's interests extended beyond his own creations, as he diligently studied plays not only in English but also in various other languages. Throughout his life, he considered himself a dedicated student of the dramatic arts, with a particular affinity for the works of William Shakespeare. On 28 April 1972, Rocha died in Goa, India, he was 73.

== Impact ==
While Rocha dedicated significant attention to the content of his plays, ensuring thorough rehearsals for the main performances, he also recognized the importance of songs in a tiatr and actively sought out talented singers. To foster the discovery of songs and singers, he organized singing competitions, which gained popularity in Bombay. These competitions served as a platform for young, aspiring talents, and many participants eventually transitioned into professional artists. In further support of composers and singers of his time, Rocha established a committee composed of expert musicians, lyricists, and singers, responsible for identifying and nurturing promising singing talent. This initiative played a pivotal role in the development and encouragement of musical talent within the Konkani community. Moreover, his influential role extended to fostering new talent, as numerous aspiring tiatrists found their entryway into the theater world through Rocha's productions.

== Style and reception ==
Fausto V. Da Costa writes, Rocha emerged as one of the Konkani stage's prominent and cherished contributors. Known as the "Lion of the Konkani stage," he made a significant impact on the development of tiatr. Rocha's talent as a writer and director earned him a special place among his peers in the tiatr community. As the founder of the Union Jack Dramatic Company, Rocha initially assumed the role of group manager. However, in 1922, he was appointed as the managing director of the company. The ensemble comprised 32 accomplished artists and singers who were known for their abilities. Rocha exercised his authority with prudence, ensuring the smooth functioning of the organization through meticulous management practices. His decisions held significant weight, and he commanded the utmost respect from the artists involved. Rocha's plays were distinguished by their captivating plots, meticulously woven narratives, and eloquent dialogues. Notably, productions such as Romeo & Juliet, Dubhavi Ghorcarn, Mog ani Krim, Nokhetr Italia Xarachem, and Kalsad Nouro were hailed as exemplary works. While Rocha's writing style was marked by simplicity, his stage arrangements were visually striking, and his direction displayed finesse. Between 1916 and 1941, Rocha authored a total of 39 plays, setting a record for his time. By the time of his death, his prolific output had expanded to encompass more than 60 plays in total. His works primarily found their stage in Bombay.

== Selected stage works ==
Year	Title	Role	Notes	Ref
1916	Zenoveva de Brabão	Writer/director	Professional debut	
1919	Noketr Italia Xarachem	Writer/director		
1929	Imperador Carlos Magno Ani Bara Par Fransache	Actor		
1931	Doth	Writer/director	Restaged in 1934	
1931	Mea Culpa	Writer/director		
1932	Mr. Bardez ani Mr. Salcete	Writer/director		
1932	First Prize	Writer		
1934	Share Holders Night	Director	Tiatr production	
1934	Son of Jeruzalem	Writer/director	Restaged in 1948	
1934	Visronk Dukh-Khont	Director		
1934	White Rose Garden Vo Dhovea Gulabachi Bag	Actor		
1935	Romeo and Juliet	Writer/director	Konkani language adaptation	
1935	Dubavi Ghorcarn	Writer/director	Restaged in 1946, 1966	
1935	Ek Oklek Teg Noure	Director		
1936	Addangi Choli ani Patrador Cholo	Director		
1936	Dona Enestina vo Sounsar Jiklim Hanv	Director		
1944	Sezareachim Kizilam	Director		
	Gupit Cazar	Writer/director		
	Mog ani Krim	Writer/director	Restaged in 1963	
	Calsad Nouro	Writer/director		
	Ghor Zanvoim	Writer/director	Restaged in 1964	
	Aunkarancho Sounsar	Writer/director		
