= Kulin Kanta =

1925 film

- Directed by: Homi Master
- Written by: Mohanlal G. Dave
- Based on: Bawla murder case
- Produced by: Kohinoor Film Company
- Starring: Khalil; Miss Moti; Miss Yakbal; Behram Vasania
- Cinematography: G. K. Gokhale
- Production company: Kohinoor Film Company
- Release date: 1925
- Country: India
- Language: Silent film

Kulin Kanta is Indian cinema's 1925 crime thriller silent film directed by Homi Master. Based on a true incident, the Bawla murder case, Kulin Kanta featured the story of the Tukojirao Holkar III, Maharaja Holkar of Indore, and Mumtaz Begum, a courtesan, who wanted to escape from Holkar's harem. The film starred the "macho hero" Khalil, cited as Indian cinema's "first ever star" in the role of the "lecherous Maharaja". The director of photography was G. K. Gokhale, with story written by Mohanlal G. Dave.

Mumtaz Begum's role was played by Miss Moti while the rest of the cast included Miss Yakbal, Moman Behram, Gani Babu, Jamuna and Behram Vasania.

== Production and story ==
Based on the infamous Bawla Murder case of 1925, Homi Master made use of the story elements involving a courtesan, royalty, romance, and murder. The case involved Maharaja Tukoji Rao Holkar III of Indore and a Muslim courtesan called Mumtaz Begum. Mumtaz escaped from the Holkar's zenana quarters in Indore and went to Bombay. Here she sought refuge from a rich benefactor and protector called Bawla.

While driving around Malabar Hill one evening, Mumtaz and Bawla were attacked by Holkar's men in full view of spectators. The attackers killed Abdur Kadir Bawla and tried to kidnap Mumtaz. Three British army officers came to the rescue of Mumtaz. Her evidence in court caused Holkar to abdicate in 1926. According to authors Gokulsing and Dissanayake the film was an "early form of the courtesan genre in Hindi cinema".

== Cast ==
- Khalil
- Miss Moti
- Miss Yakbal
- Moman Behram
- Gani Babu
- Jamuna
- Behram Vasania
