= Rama (playwright) =

20th-century Portuguese playwright

- Born: Morjim, Goa, Portuguese India
- Died: Bombay (now Mumbai, Maharashtra, India) (most likely)
- Occupation: Playwright
- Era: Early phase of tiatr (Note: During the period from 1892 to the 1930s, the initial phase of tiatr emerged as the foundational stage of Konkani theater. It remains uncertain whether Braganza continued to be involved in the art form beyond this early phase, as historical records do not provide conclusive evidence of his continued activity.)
- Known for: Maurice and Juliana vo A Real Love Story

L.C.D. Braganza (Note: Braganza's complete name remains undisclosed, with indications suggesting a possible Portuguese origin. Various authors have depicted his name using different spellings, including L. C. D'Braganza, L C D Braganza, L.C. D'Braganza, or L C D' Braganza. Konkani historian and singer Wilson Mazarello has referenced him as L.C.D. Braganza (Alias Rama) or L C D alias Rama in his works.) (fl. 1908–1910), known mononymously as Rama, was an early 20th-century Portuguese playwright known for his work in tiatr productions. His popular tiatr Maurice and Juliana vo A Real Love Story (1910) had a significant impact on Saib Rocha, an early Konkani playwright, who later became a leading producer and director in the Konkani theater scene. Braganza, along with a few other tiatrists (tiatr performers) such as Karachiwala, F. X. Fernandes Douglas, Rogaciano D'Souza, and Affonceka, played a crucial role in strengthening the foundation of Konkani tiatr during the 20th century.

Originally from Morjim, Goa, Braganza relocated to Bombay during British India. He then began staging several tiatrs from around 1908 onwards. Two years later, he shot to fame with his tiatr Maurice and Juliana vo A Real Love Story in 1910, which featured actors like Affonceka, who made his debut in the tiatr with a small role as a servant, which contributed to his early success on the Konkani stage. To date, very little information exists about Braganza. The first information about him was written by Konkani historian and singer Wilson Mazarello in his book 100 Years of Tiatro in 2000. The second was by Goa University professor André Raphael Fernandes, who included Braganza among the list of tiatr personalities in 2010. A little more about Braganza's place of origin and his place of residence was uncovered by writer Fausto V. da Costa in the book TIATR 125th Anniversary Commemorative Volume (2019).

== Career ==
Fausto V. da Costa, in the book TIATR 125th Anniversary Commemorative Volume, discusses the artistic contributions of Braganza, a figure in the realm of tiatr, a popular form of Goan musical theater. From approximately 1908 onwards, Braganza began staging his own tiatrs in Bombay (now Mumbai). Among his various works, one production that brought him acclaim was Maurice and Juliana vo A Real Love Story, (Note: In the Konkani language, the word "vo" has the translation of "or".) which premiered in Bombay in 1910. Wilson Mazarello, a Konkani historian and singer, explains in his book 100 Years of Konkani Tiatro that it was during one of Braganza's tiatrs in Bombay that a young 12 year old Goan boy named A. J. Rocha (also known as Saib Rocha) had a transformative experience. Rocha, who had traveled to Bombay for further studies, was in the audience and this particular tiatr likely played a pivotal role in shaping his career as a prominent playwright, director, producer, and administrator in the world of Konkani tiatrs. Rocha eventually became a leading figure in the production and direction of Konkani tiatrs. Maurice and Juliana vo A Real Love Story featured a notable cast, including Affonceka (Assis João Avelino Afonso), an early Konkani actor and playwright, who portrayed the character of Ramis, a servant.

== Personal life ==
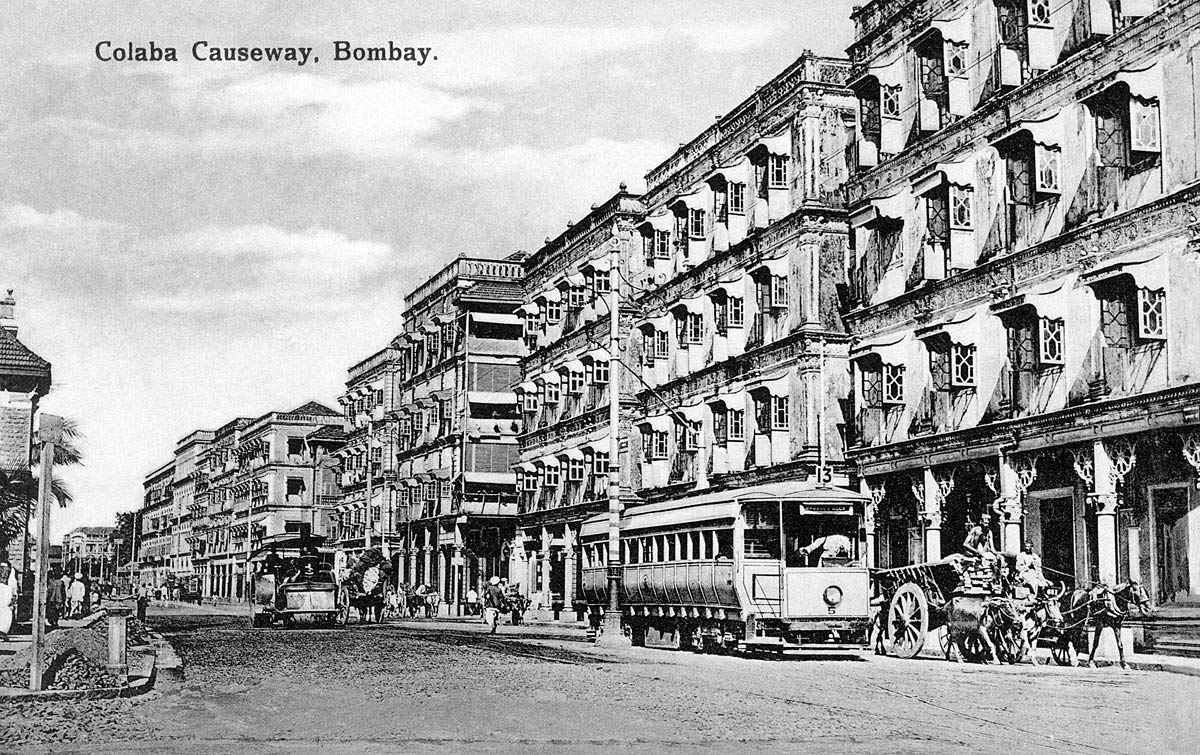
A photo of Colaba Causeway, 1905

There is limited information available regarding Braganza's personal life. He hailed from Morjim, a census town located in the Pernem taluka of Goa, which was a part of Portuguese India during the era of the Portuguese Empire (now situated in India). According to da Costa's TIATR 125th Anniversary Commemorative Volume (2019), Braganza resided on Colaba Island in Bombay, which was under British control at that time. Braganza was married to an unidentified woman who was engaged in the Konkani stage. She directed her husband's theatrical production Maurice and Juliana vo A Real Love Story in 1910.

== Selected stage works ==
Year	Title	Role	Notes	Ref
1910	Maurice and Juliana vo A Real Love Story	Writer		
