= Ermeline =

Indian actress

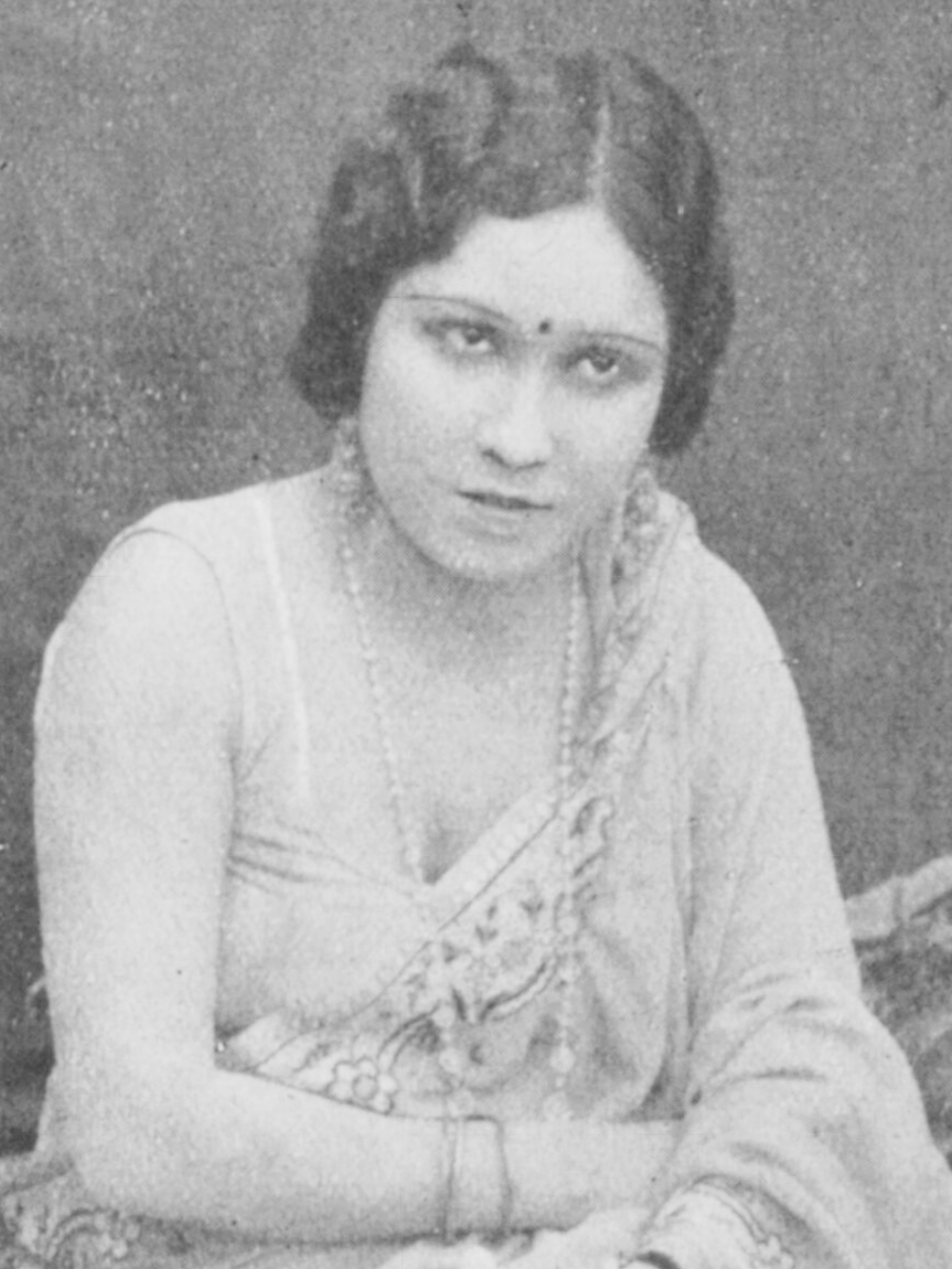
- Cardozo posing for a magazine, 1933
- Born: Ermelinda Cardozo; 7 May 1908; Divar, Goa, Portuguese India
- Other names: Sudhabala
- Citizenship: Portugal (until 1961); India (from 1961)
- Occupation: Actress
- Notable work: Draupadi (1931)
- Spouse: Saib Rocha

Ermelinda Cardozo (7 May 1908 – unknown), also known mononymously as Ermeline, and later by her stage name Sudhabala, was an Indian actress from the silent era of Hindi films. She is often credited with providing the first significant acting job to Prithviraj Kapoor, the patriarch of the Kapoor family in the Hindi film industry. Along with Patience Cooper, Ruby Myers, and Sita Devi, she is credited as a "leading star" of the 1920s and 1930s who had more mass appeal than their male counterparts.

== Early life ==
Ermelinda Cardozo was born on 7 May 1908, to Paulo Faustino Cardoso and Maria Joaquina de Souza in the island of Divar, Goa, which was part of Portuguese India during the Portuguese Empire. Suffering from financial constraints from early days of her life, she never really had any formal education as her parents brought her to Bombay, British India in search of work. She was illiterate.

== Career ==
Cardozo started off her career with the film Bhishma Pitamah under the banner of Star Films in 1922. The film starred actor Madanrai Vakil opposite her. Being the first actress of Goan descent, she went on to feature in around sixty odd films and was fondly called "Mary Pickford of India". She, along with Sulochana, went on to be one of the earliest sex symbols of Indian cinema since they were overly sexualized.

Cardozo is also credited as one of the earliest film artists who took stand against sexual harassment at workplace. A news item, "Film Star's Story; Incidents at Hill Station," which appeared in The Times of India on 15 September 1927, reported that she went to court, charging the director and chairman of the Shri Krishna Cinema Company with indecent assault. During the shoot of Burkhawali at Matheran, she went to the Superintendent of Police that cameraman Chaturbhai Patel and film director Kanjibhai Rathod had entered her hotel room and outraged her modesty. The first magistrate who tried the case found that the complaints were false and ordered her to pay Rs. 100. A second judge reversed this judgment because he found the first magistrate to have been biased by the fact that Cardozo was an untutored woman of loose morals and bad association.

Cardozo is often credited with giving Prithviraj Kapoor his first big break in Hindi cinema. It so happened that the actor who was originally cast as the male lead failed to appear for the shooting of the film. This sent the filmmaker into frenzy and he asked Cardozo to pick the leading man from the throng of people who came there to see her. She handpicked Prithviraj, who by then had acted in a few bit roles. This film was Cinema Girl which released in 1930. The advent of talkies posed a threat to Cardozo's career as she was not well versed with the Hindustani language. She was then restricted to play the role of vamps and eventually faded away from the film scene.

Her most important film role was that of Draupadi in the 1931 mythological costume drama of the same name. Her other films include Zalim Jawani, Sarovar Ki Sundari, Swapna Sundari and Sharif Badmash to name a few.

== Personal life ==
Cardozo married Saib Rocha, a leading tiatrist (theatre performer) of that time. The most popular tiatr (theatre production) in which she acted was Lusitanian Dramatic Company's Alma Vetat Sorgar on 17 October 1932.

== Death ==
Not much is known about how Cardozo died. When film historian Bhagwan Das Garga wrote a column appealing for financial help for Cardozo who has turned pauper, she got him fired from his job. While some sources claim that she died broke, others believe she died in an accident on the sets of an unnamed film.

== Filmography ==
- Bhishma Pitamah (1922)
- Sharif Badmash (1924)
- Lalan Vanzari (1925)
- Kamlata (1925)
- Hothal Padmini (1925)
- Swapna Sundari (1925)
- Anath Abla (1925)
- Chandrakant (1925)
- Veer Kesri (1926)
- Boltu Bulbul (1926)
- Ram Bharose (1926)
- Panch Kalyan Aur Parijatak (1926)
- Love Is Blind (1926)
- Khoobsurat Bala (1926)
- Amar Asha (1926)
- Be Dinani Badshahi (1926)
- Burkhawali (1926)
- The Victim (1926)
- Kicks of Kismet (1927)
- Tainted Virtue (1927)
- Shree Jagadguru (1928)
- Madan Manjari (1928)
- Ek Abla (1928)
- Puran Bhagat (1928)
- Sarovar Ki Sundari (1928)
- Geeta Rahasya (1928)
- Hoor E Bagdhad (1928)
- Haya Na Haar (1928)
- Chandrahas (1928)
- Pandav Patrani (1928)
- Kamla Kumari (1928)
- Lal Vavto (1929)
- Raj Ramni (1929)
- Gulshan E Arab (1929)
- Do Dhari Talwar (1929)
- Vijay Kumar (1930)
- Nai Roshni (1930)
- Cinema Girl (1930)
- Vasant Bengali (1930)
- Raj Tilak (1931)
- Draupadi (1931)
- Toofani Taruni (1931)
- Namak Haram Kaun (1931)
- Golibari (1931)
- Toofan Tufani (1931)
- Zalim Jawani (1932)
- Kalo Sawar (1932)
- Abad Chor (1933)
- Azad Abla (1934)
- Khazana (1934)
- Raj Tarang (1935)
- Prisoner of Golconda (1954)
