= Savkari Pash =

1925 film

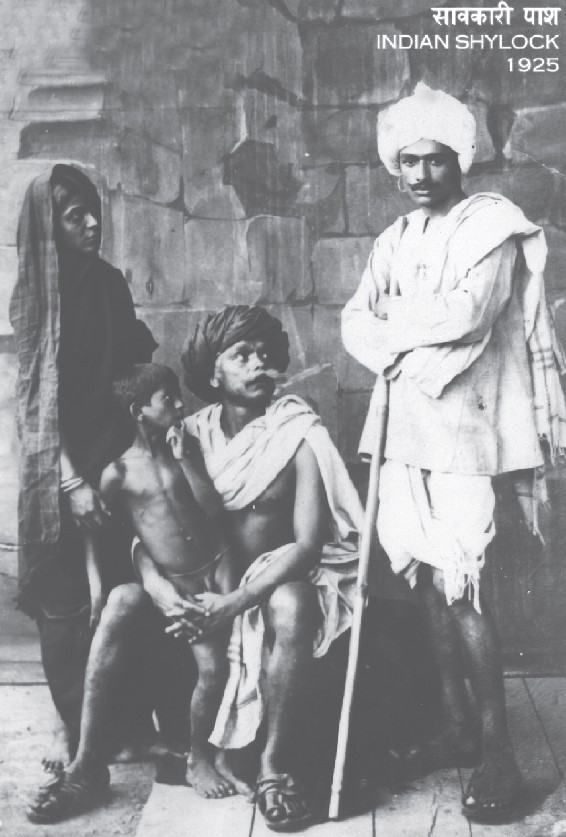
- Screen shot from Savkari Pash
- Directed by: Baburao Painter
- Written by: Narayan Hari Apte
- Produced by: Maharashtra Film Company, Kolhapur
- Starring: V. Shantaram; Kamladevi; Zunzharrao Pawar; K. Dhaiber
- Cinematography: Sheikh Fattelal
- Production companies: Maharashtra Film Company, Kolhapur
- Release date: 1925
- Running time: 80 minutes
- Country: India
- Languages: Silent Film; Marathi intertitles

Savkari Pash (The Indian Shylock) is Indian cinema's 1925 social melodrama silent film directed by Baburao Painter. V. Shantaram made his acting debut as the young village peasant in the film. Painter later remade Savkari Pash in 1936 as a talkie version. The story of the film was written by Narayan Hari Apte as suggested by Baburao Painter, and is referred to as a "milestone film" in Indian cinema. Along with Shantaram, the rest of the cast included Kamladevi, Zunzharrao Pawar, Kishabapu Bakre, K. Dhaiber and Shankarrao Bute.

The film has been cited as one of the "earliest examples" of parallel cinema in its depiction of real social issues. The story deals with a greedy moneylender who cheats the peasants of their money, forcing them to give up farming and take on jobs as mill-workers.

== Cast ==
- V. Shantaram
- Kamladevi
- Zunzharrao Pawar
- Kishabapu Bakre
- K. Dhaiber
- Shankarrao Bute
