= Draupadi (1931 film) =

1931 film

- Directed by: Bhagwati Prasad Mishra
- Written by: Bhagwati Prasad Mishra
- Based on: Vyasa's Mahabharata
- Produced by: Ardeshir Irani
- Starring: Sudhabala; Prithviraj Kapoor; Khalil; Jagdish Sethi
- Cinematography: Adi Irani
- Production company: Imperial Film Company
- Release date: 1931
- Running time: 124 minutes
- Country: British India
- Language: Hindi

Draupadi (The Daughter Of King Drupad) is a 1931 sound film from Indian cinema. The film was a big-budget mythological production from Ardeshir Irani's Imperial Film Company following their release of the first talkie in India, Alam Ara (1931). It was directed by Bhagwati Prasad Mishra, who had made a name for himself as a photographer and painter and had worked with Irani in his Star, Majestic, Royal and Imperial Studios. The story adaptation from Vyasa's Mahabharata and the screenplay, were by Mishra. The star cast included Prithviraj Kapoor who played the role of Karna, with Sudhabala as Draupadi, and Khalil as Krishna. The rest of cast included Hadi, Elizer, Rustom Irani and Jilloobai. The cinematographer was Adi Irani.

The film was based on an episode from the Mahabharata showcasing Duryodhan's plans of usurping Hastinapur and his subsequent attempt at shaming the Pandavas by disrobing Draupadi's sari.

== Plot ==
Duryodhana (Jagdish Sethi) plots to attain Hastinapur for himself and his hundred Kaurava brothers. The five Pandavas brothers are sent to exile during which time Arjuna (Prithviraj Kapoor wins Draupadi (Sudhabala) at her swayamvara. According to his mother's unintentional suggestion, the five brothers share Draupadi as their wife. On their return from banishment, the Pandavas establish themselves at Indraprastha. The Rajasuya Yagna takes place and a game of dice follows. The Kauravas cunning uncle Shakuni (Hadi) helps them win the game, wherein the Pandavas first lose their Kingdom, and then as a last wager by the oldest brother Yudhishtra, even Draupadi. When Duryodhan, with the intention of shaming the Pandavas tries to remove Draupadi's sari, it is Lord Krishna who saves her from humiliation by performing the miracle of a never-ending sari.

== Cast ==
- Sudhabala as Draupadi
- Khalil as Lord Krishna
- Prithviraj Kapoor as Karna
- Jilloobai as Kunti
- Jagdish as Duryodhana
- Hadi as Shakuna Mama
- Elizer as Yudhishtra
- Rostam Irani as Bhim
- Nayampally

== Draupadi in Indian Cinema ==
The use of Hindu mythology in context to women, was a common feature in most films produced in the early part of the twentieth century. According to author Prem Chowdhry, Draupadi was referenced in films about eleven times between 1916 and 1944.

=== Silent films ===
Lists:

- Keechaka Vadham a.k.a. Draupadi Vastrapaharanam (1916) directed by R. Nataraja Mudaliar
- Draupadi Vastraharan (1920)
- Sairandhari (1920) directed by Baburao Painter
- Draupadi Swayamwar (1922) directed by Vishnupant Divekar
- Draupadi Veni Bandhan a.k.a. Veni Bandhan (1922) directed by Vishnupant Divekar
- Draupadi's Fate a.k.a. Draupadi Bhagya (1924) directed by Raghupathy Prakash.
- Draupadi Vastraharan (1927) directed by Dadasaheb Phalke
- Draupadi Vastraharan (1928) directed by P. Y. Altekar
- Keechak Vadh (1928) directed by Baburao Painter

=== Talkies ===
Lists:

- Draupadi (1931) directed by Bhagwati Prasad Mishra
- Sairandhari (1933) directed by V. Shantaram for Prabhat Film Company
- Draupadi Vastrapaharanam (1934) a Tamil-language film directed by R. Padmanaban.
- Draupadi Vastrapaharanam (1936) a Telugu-language film directed by Hanumappa Vishwanath Babu
- Draupadi Manasamrakshnam (1936) a Telugu-language film, directed by S. Jagganath
- Draupadi (1944) directed by Baburao Patel
- Draupadi Vastraharan (1952) directed by W. Garcher

== Soundtrack ==
=== Song list ===
The songs were sung by the actors in the film.

| # | Title | Singer |
|---|---|---|
| 1 | "Anokhi Jaadu Bhari Mri Kaisi Hai Paase Ki Chaal" | Hadi |
| 2 | "Bhagat Ke Bas Mein Hai Bhagwan" | Khalil |
| 3 | "Bhaj Krishan Kanhaiya Paar Kare Meri Naiya" | |
| 4 | "Do Din Ka Mehmaan Arre Kyun Murkh Mann Bhatkave" | Jilloobai |
| 5 | "Gaavein Manaavein Aanad Hum Mil Kar Saari" | Chorus |
| 6 | "Jis Main Apni Nazar Se Dekhoon" | Ermeline |
| 7 | "Kanhaiya Aao Re Dhaao Re" | Ermeline |
| 8 | "Laaj Rakhe Dinanath Jagat Mein" | Ermeline |
| 9 | "Main Toh Shakuni Kumar Hoon Matlab Ka Yaar Hoon" | Hadi |
| 10 | "Mujh Mein Kaisi Badi Karamaat Hai" | |
| 11 | "Nayanwa Khol Maharaj Atal Rahe Tero Raj" | Hadi |
