= Karachiwala =

Goan playwright and theatre director

- Born: Sebastião Gabriel de Sousa; Aldona, Goa, Portuguese India
- Died: Bombay (now Mumbai, Maharashtra, India) (most likely)
- Other names: S. G. De Souza; Karachiwalla; Sebastian Gabriel D'Souza
- Occupations: Playwright; theatre director; producer; singer; composer

Sebastião Gabriel de Sousa (fl. 1904–1909), known mononymously as Karachiwala, was an early 20th-century Goan playwright, theatre director, theatrical producer, singer, and composer who worked on the Konkani stage.

== Career ==
During the same era, a figure emerged on the Konkani music and theater scene in Bombay, alongside L.C.D. Braganza, also known as Rama. This individual, known by his stage name Karachiwala, made contributions as a Konkani singer, composer, and playwright. The origin of his moniker remains obscure, though it is speculated that he may have resided in Karachi, British India for an extended period before returning to Bombay, which was then part of British India. De Sousa garnered popularity for his well-received stage productions. His talents extended beyond acting, as he showcased skills in composing songs and delivering vocal performances. De Sousa undertook the translation and adaptation of several English plays into Konkani, which were staged in Bombay's Konkani tiatr circuit. Among these adaptations were works by Shakespeare, including Merchant of Venice, Hamlet, As You Like It, and The Winter's Tale. In addition to his theatrical achievements, de Sousa authored several popular tiatrs, including Carlos Magno Ani 12 par Fransache, Kustoba, and Roldao Xinvachea Pottant. He was also among the early Konkani writers who published their plays and songs in book form. Publications include Kustoba, Faust 1, and Faust 2, which showcased his literary prowess. De Sousa's compositions were compiled into collections such as the Comik Cantaranche Album and Cantarache Chear Album. A milestone in de Sousa's career came in 1909 when his two-act play Faust, featuring eighteen songs accompanied by musical scores, was published after its debut at Bombay's Gaiety Theatre.

Custoba stands out as one of de Sousa's acclaimed theatrical works, garnering critical acclaim upon its publication in the same year. Following his death, several posthumous plays by de Sousa were published, including Inocente Hermione Vo Dubavi Leontes in Karachi in 1926 and Abou Hassan in Bombay in 1927. De Sousa was a member of the tiatrists group, known for their performances under the direction of João Agostinho Fernandes. Collaborating with Fernandes elevated their artistry, leading to popularity and admiration from audiences. Rogaciano D'Souza, a Goan playwright hailing from Saligão, was among de Sousa's contemporaries. De Sousa belonged to the early tiatrists of the period spanning from 1910 to 1940, who played a pivotal role in upholding the legacy of Konkani tiatr throughout the first half of the 20th century. While some tiatrists had relatively brief careers, others enjoyed enduring success. They made contributions as playwrights and composers, with figures like C. Alvares, Vincent de Saligão, Master Vaz, and Valente Mascarenhas undertaking the multifaceted responsibilities of writing, producing, and directing Konkani tiatrs. As a result, singers and actors had few choices for maintaining the vitality of Konkani tiatr until a playwright created a new piece.

De Sousa held multiple roles as a writer, producer, and director, demonstrating his versatility in the art form. One of his audience members was Saib Rocha, a young playwright who found inspiration in de Sousa's tiatrs, which were performed in the 1910s. De Sousa, alongside John Lazarus, emerged as an influential producers of English dramas and Konkani translations. In addition, De Sousa established a theatrical company known as Karachiwalla's Delectable Company, which operated for a limited period before eventually dissolving. This company was one of several dramatic clubs that contributed to the theatrical scene of the time. In a letter written by João Agostinho Fernandes on 24 July 1939, and later published in The Goa Mail on 30 July 1939, details de Sousa's lack of participation in Fernandes' play Battkara, performed on 22 November 1904. Fernandes stated that due to De Sousa's irregular attendance at rehearsals, he did not have a role in the play. Despite this, Fernandes allowed De Sousa to perform a comic song on the opening day. Fernandes emphasized the significance of rigorous rehearsals in achieving artistic excellence and producing qualitatively superior tiatrs. De Sousa was one among many tiatrists who flourished during the early phase of tiatr, spanning from 1892 to the 1930s. This period marked the emergence of pioneering dramatists who reaped immediate benefits and played a crucial role in shaping the tiatr tradition.

== Personal life ==
Sebastião Gabriel de Sousa originated from the village of Aldona in Goa, then a colony of Portuguese India within the Portuguese Empire (now in India). During his formative years, he resided in Karachi, which was part of the Bombay Presidency in British India. It was during this period that he honed his skills as a playwright, specifically in the genre of tiatrs (form of Goan musical theatre), and gained recognition as a singer and composer, earning the esteem of tiatr audiences. Subsequently, de Sousa relocated to Bombay (now Mumbai), where he garnered acclaim for his Konkani writings and performances in tiatrs. Among his peers, he was affectionately referred to as 'Karachiwala'.

== Legacy ==
On 30 January 2015, the Tiatr Academy of Goa organized a commemorative event known as the Somplolea Tiatristancho Ugddas. This event, held at the Conference Hall of the Tiatr Academy of Goa located in the Campal Trade Centre, Campal, Panaji, aimed to honor the memory of deceased tiatrists who were born in a specific month. Although the exact birth date of de Sousa was unavailable, he was included in the remembrance during that particular month's event. Continuing the tradition, on 23 January 2018, de Sousa was once again remembered at the same event. The program took place at the Conference Hall, on the second floor of the Campal Trade Centre, Campal, Panaji, which is an integral part of the Tiatr Academy of Goa. Furthermore, on 29 January 2020, de Sousa's contributions were honored once again at the same event. This time, the program took place at the Black Box venue within the premises of Ravindra Bhavan, located in Margao.
