= Sairandhri (1933 film) =

Sairandhari
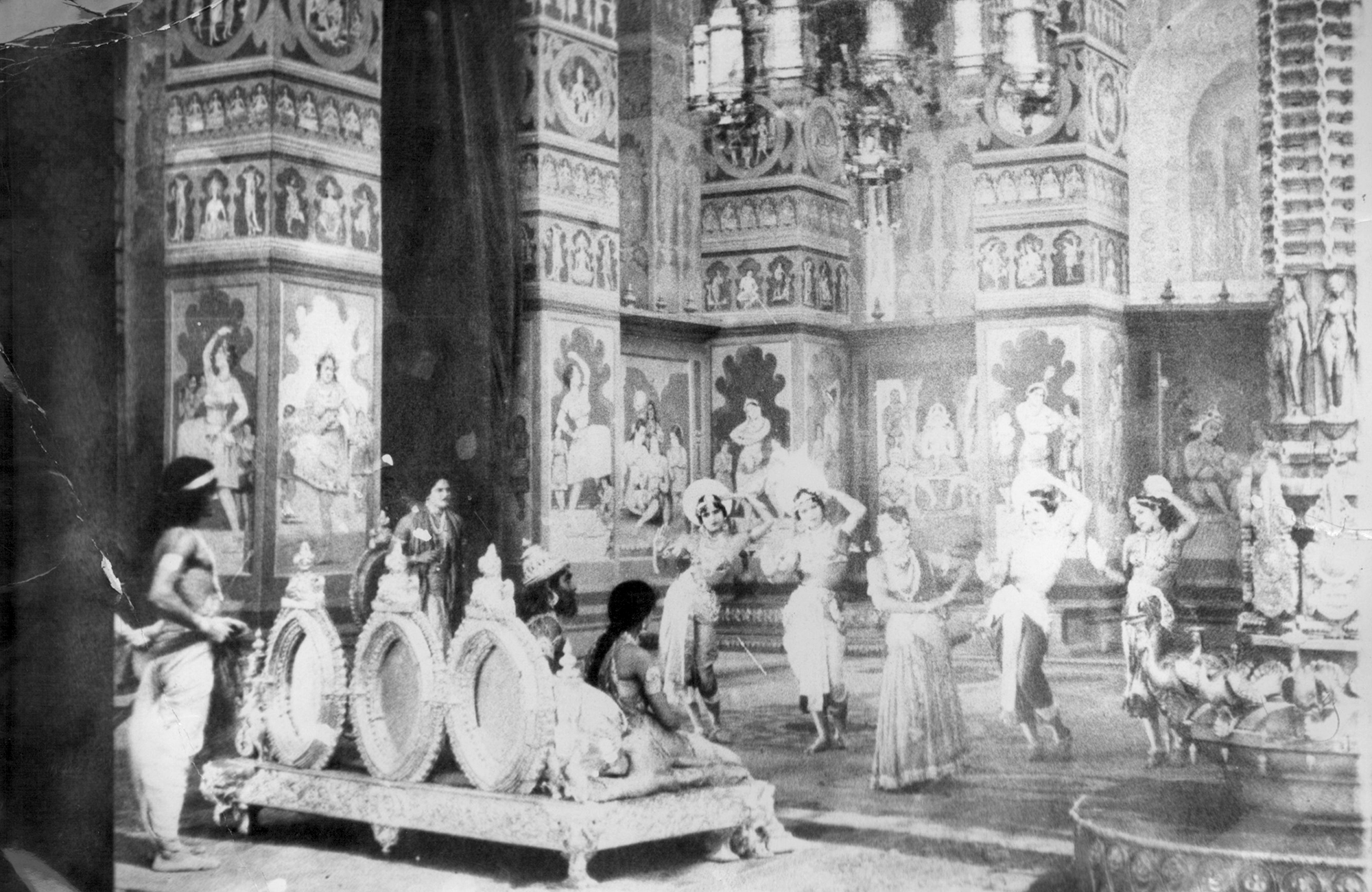
- Screen shot from Sairandhari
- Directed by: V. Shantaram
- Produced by: Prabhat Film Company
- Starring: Master Vinayak; Leela; Nimbalkar; G. R. Mane
- Cinematography: Keshavrao Dhaiber
- Music by: Govindrao Tembe
- Production company: Prabhat Film Company
- Release date: 1933
- Country: India
- Languages: Marathi; Hindi

Sairandhari (सैरंध्री) a 1933 Indian mythological film based on an episode from the Mahabharata and directed by V. Shantaram. The film was a bilingual made as Sairandhari in both Marathi and Hindi. Produced by Prabhat Film Company, it has been cited as one of the 21 "most wanted missing Indian treasures" by P. K. Nair, the National Film Archive of India founder. The music composer was Govindrao Tembe. The cast included Master Vinayak, Leela, Prabhavati, Shakuntala, G.R. Mane, Nimbalkar and Shankarrao Bhosle.

It is the first Indian colour film. The film was shot on Agfa B&W 35-mm negative. The release prints were made in Germany by Bipack colour printing process.

The film revolved around an incident from the Mahabharata and told the story of Draupadi as Malini/Sairandhari (female servant), the thirteenth identity she took in order to remain safe and hidden from the Kauravas.

== Plot ==
The story is about the twelfth of the thirteen years of the Pandavas exile. Draupadi in her identity as Sairandhari (female servant) is acting as the maid-in-waiting to Queen Sudeshna. They are in King Virata's palace in Matsya. Kichaka, King Virata's brother-in-law and Sudeshna's brother is an arrogant man who believes that King Virat rules his kingdom because of him. He sees Sairandhari and orders his sister to send Sairandhari to his palace. When she reaches Keechak's palace Bhima who is disguised as the palace cook, arrives to save her and slays Kichaka.

== Cast ==
- Master Vinayak as King Virat
- Leela as Sairandhari
- Mane
- Nimbalkar as Keechak
- Shakuntala
- Prabhavati
- Kulkarni
- Bhonsle
- Salunke

== Production ==
Shantaram had been impressed by the "technical virtuosity" in films of Pabst, Lang, and Max Ophuls. Sairandhari was made in colour but for processing Shantaram took it to the UFA studios in Germany. However, the technique failed and the film was released as a Black-and-white production as the colours turned out to be too garish. The film was stated as the first Indian colour film, the processing was done in Germany. Even though a good reaction was expected for this colour film - the processing of the negatives was messed up by the lab in Germany causing the colours to be too garish. The audience rejected the film and it played for less than a week.

The film is also credited as having the first original soundtrack disc. The Gramaphone Records were "pressed" from the original soundtrack in Germany.

== Remake ==
It was remade as Keechak Vadh in 1959, starring Shobhana Samarth, Helen, Baburao Pendharkar.

== Draupadi in films ==
The film was a remake of the earlier silent film Sairandhari (1920) made by Baburao Painter and the remake of Prabhat's original Keechak Vadhan (1928). Draupadi, a "mythological image" and an oppressed figure was used as a nationalistic representative for India under the British Raj. The several films made from 1916 to 1944 using Draupadi were:

- Keechak Vadham (1916)
- Draupadi Vastaharan (1920)
- Sairandhari (1920)
- Draupadi Swayamvar (1922)
- Draupadi's Fate (1924)
- Draupadi Vastaharan (1927)
- Draupadi Vastaharan (1928)
- Keechakvadh (1928)
- Draupadi (1931) Talkie
- Sairandhari (1933)
- Draupadi (1944)

== Soundtrack ==
Hindi Soundtrack

#	Title	Singer
1	Aaiye Bal Nirbalon Ke Din Ke Dhan Aaiye	Leela
2	Ghulami Ke Gham Ko Who Kya Jante Hain	Leela
3	Kusum Kumkum Amit Varsha	Leela
4	Man Harat Rang Phoolon Ke	Leela
5	Ruchir Rachi Mala hoolon Ki Sakhi	Leela, Prabhavati
6	Saran Gun Sharam Se Ho	
7	Nisdin Soch Rahat Man Mora	
8	Koi Dujo Nahin Hari Bin	
9	Ab Na Bulao Jamuna Ke Teer Par	

== See also ==
- List of early color feature films
