= Sairandhri (1920 film) =

1920 film

- Sairandhri
- Directed by: Baburao Painter
- Written by: Baburao Painter
- Starring: Balasabeb Yadav, Zunzharrao Pawar, Kamaladev
- Release date: February 7, 1920
- Running time: 1,511.2 m
- Country: India
- Language: Silent

Sairandhari is a 1920 Indian film based on an episode from the Mahabharata and directed by Baburao Painter and Produced by Maharashtra Film Company. V. Shantaram remade it as Sairandhri in 1933.

== Cast ==
- Balasabeb Yadav as Bheema
- Zunzharrao Pawar as Keechak
- Kamaladevi as Sairandhri
- Kishabapu Bakre
- Baburao Pendharkar as Krishna
- Ravji Mhaskar
- Ganpat Bakre as King Veerat
- Sushiladevi as Sudeshna
- Sitarampat Kulkarni
- Shivram Vashikar
- Vishnupant Govind Damle
