= Draupadi Vastrapaharanam (disambiguation) =

Draupadi Vastrapaharanam means disrobing of Draupadi.

Draupadi Vastrapaharanam may also refer to:

- Draupadi Vastrapaharanam (1934 film), a Tamil-language film
- Draupadi Vastrapaharanam (1936 film), a Telugu-language film
