= Tukojirao Holkar III =

Maharaja of Indore from 1903 to 1926

Tukoji Rao III
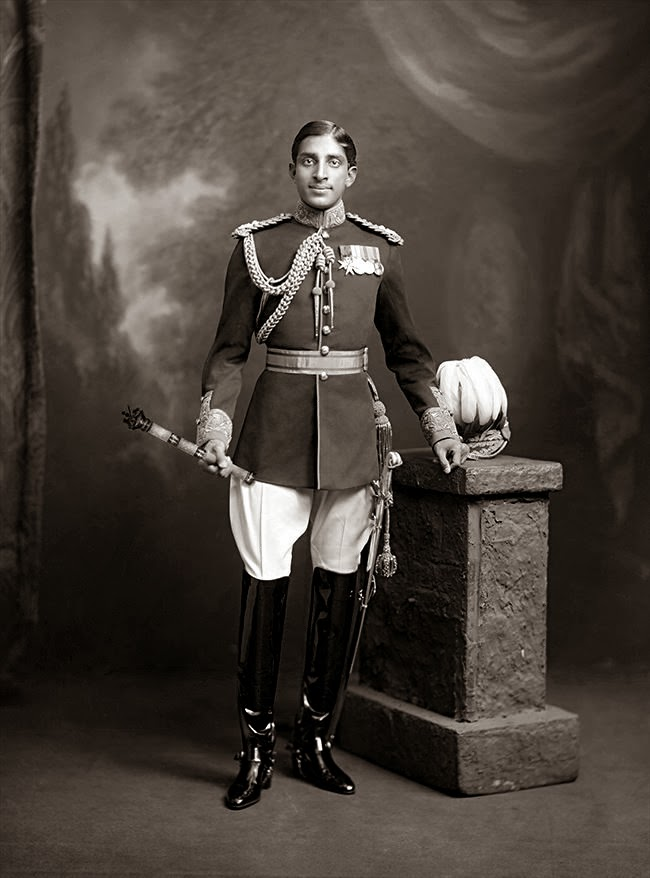
- HH Tukoji Rao Holkar III, 27 September 1913

13th Holkar Maharaja of Indore
- Reign: 31 January 1903 – 26 February 1926
- Predecessor: Shivajirao Holkar
- Successor: Yeshwantrao Holkar II
- Born: 26 November 1890; Maheshwar, British Raj
- Died: 21 May 1978 (aged 87); Paris, France
- Spouses: Chandravati Gawade (m. 1895) Indira Talcherkar (m. 1913) Nancy Anne Miller (m. 1928)
- Issue: Yashwantrao Holkar II; Sita Raje Ghatge
- House: Holkar
- Father: Shivajirao Holkar

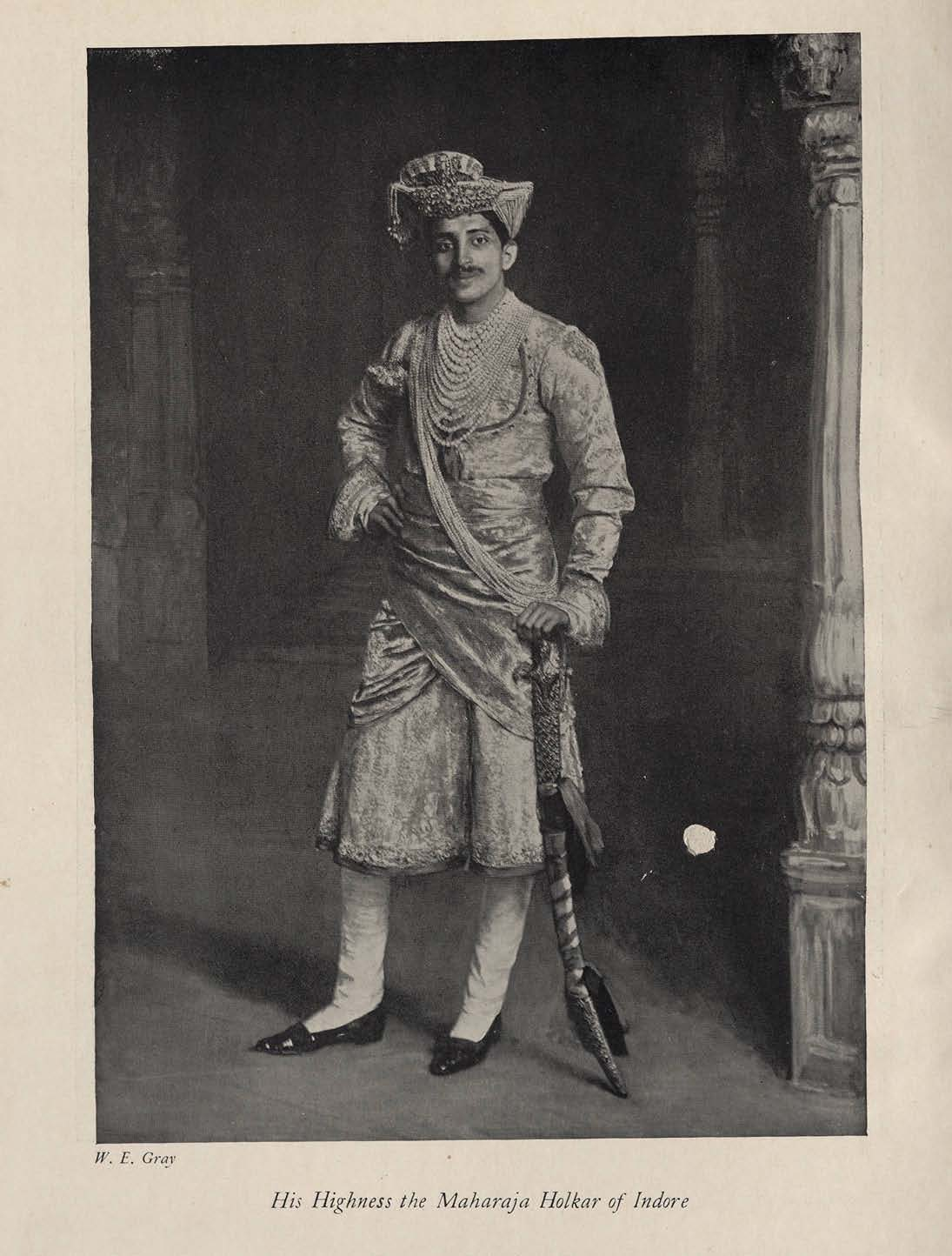
Tukoji in 1911

Maharajadhiraj Sir Raj Rajeshwar Sawai Shri Tukojirao III Holkar XIII Bahadur GCIE (26 November 1890 – 21 May 1978) was the Maharaja of the Princely Indore State in central India between 1903 and 1926.

== Early years ==
Tukoji was born in 1890, the son of Shivajirao Holkar, Maharaja of Indore. His mother was Maharani Sita Bai Sahib Holkar. His father abdicated on 31 January 1903, whereupon Tukoji became Maharaja. As he was only 13 years old, a council of regency was appointed, which lasted until he came of age. On 6 November 1911, at the age of 21, Tukoji was invested with ruling powers and the regency was ended. Tukoji completed his education from the Daly College, Indore and ICC, Dehradun.

In 1911, Tukoji attended the coronation of George V of the United Kingdom in London. He founded the Order of Merit of Holkar (February 1914) and the Order of Ahilyabai Holkar (22 November 1920). He was invested as a Knight Grand Commander of the Order of the Star of India in the 1918 New Year Honours.

== Scandal and abdication ==
In January 1925, one of Tukoji's mistresses, Mumtaz Begum —a courtesan— escaped from his harem after repressive conditions and the death of her daughter, which she blamed on palace nurses.

She later met 25-year-old Abdul Bawla, a local Memon businessman, while performing in Mumbai. Bawla was threatened multiple times and ordered to send Mumtaz Begum back to the Maharaja, but he refused.

On January 12, a group of assassins attacked the couple at Malabar Hill – Bawla was killed via gunshot to the head, but Begum survived with a facial laceration due to intervention from local British officers. Gunfire was exchanged between the assassins and British forces, and in the following investigation led by the British, Begum testified against her 9 accused assailants, which included men under Tukoji's Royal Household.

The court sentenced three men to death and three to life imprisonment (one of whom, General Anandrao Gangram Phanse of the Indore Army, was spared the death penalty under representation of Muhammad Ali Jinnah, the later founder of Pakistan) but stopped short of formally holding Tukoji accountable.

Under pressure from the British, who had otherwise threatened to pursue a public investigation, Tukoji abdicated in favour of his only son and heir Yashwantrao Holkar II on 26 February 1926, and left Indore entirely. After his abdication, Tukoji resided mainly in France.

The incident inspired a 1925 film, Kulin Kanta and two books.

== Marriages and issue ==
Tukoji married three times. His senior wife was Chandravati Gawade, daughter of Raoji Gawade, a nobleman of Indore state. The wedding was held on 16 March 1895, when Tukoji was hardly four years old; his bride was only seven years old. They had two children, including his only son and successor. Chandravati remained in Indore after Tukoji's abdication, and raised her minor son, the next Maharaja of Indore. An embodiment of traditional values and culture, Chandravati was always sympathetic and supportive to her husband, and maintained a cordial relationship with him all her life. In later years, she occasionally traveled outside Indore state to meet Tukoji whenever he visited India.

In 1913, Tukoji married Indira Talcherkar (born 1896), daughter of Mukundrao Talcherkar, an important government officer based in Bombay. They had a single daughter, who died in 1925 aged ten from sepsis. Maharani Indira Bai also remained in Indore after the abdication and exile of her husband. She had a strong interest in history and in religion. After Tukoji's exile, which happened a year after the death of their daughter, Maharani Indira Bai occupied herself with pursuing these interests in earnest. She served as patron of several historical research bodies, including the Rajwade Historical Research Institute, the Ramdas Research Institute, Dhule; the Vedic Research Society, Pune; the Dharmakosha Karyalaya, Wai, Maharashtra; and, after independence, the Maharashtra Sahitya Parishad. The two Maharanis resided in the same palace in Indore and enjoyed a genuinely cordial, even affectionate relationship, after Tukoji left for exile.

In 1928, two years after his abdication and exile, Tukoji married for the third and last time. His bride was Sharmista Devi Holkar, born Nancy Anne Miller, an American woman. Before the wedding, Nancy Anne Miller embraced Hinduism and was received into the Dhangar community. She was sponsored and adopted by Princess Tarabai and her husband, Colonel Lambhate, who also gave her away in marriage to Tukoji. Sharmishta Holkar bore four daughters

Tukojirao died in Paris on 21 May 1978. He had one son, Yashwantrao Holkar II, and six daughters. His daughter, Sumitra Raje Holkar, married Raghavendra Singh, son of Maharaja Bhupinder Singh of Patiala.

== See also ==
- Kulin Kanta
- Yeshwant Club
- Daly College
- Indore State
- Maratha Empire
- List of Maratha dynasties and states

Tukojirao Holkar III Holkar Dynasty Born: 26 November 1890 Died: 21 May 1978
Regnal titles
Preceded by Shivajirao Holkar	Maharaja Holkar of Indore; 1903–1926	Succeeded by Yeshwantrao Holkar II
