= Miss Carlota =

Goan theatre actress and singer

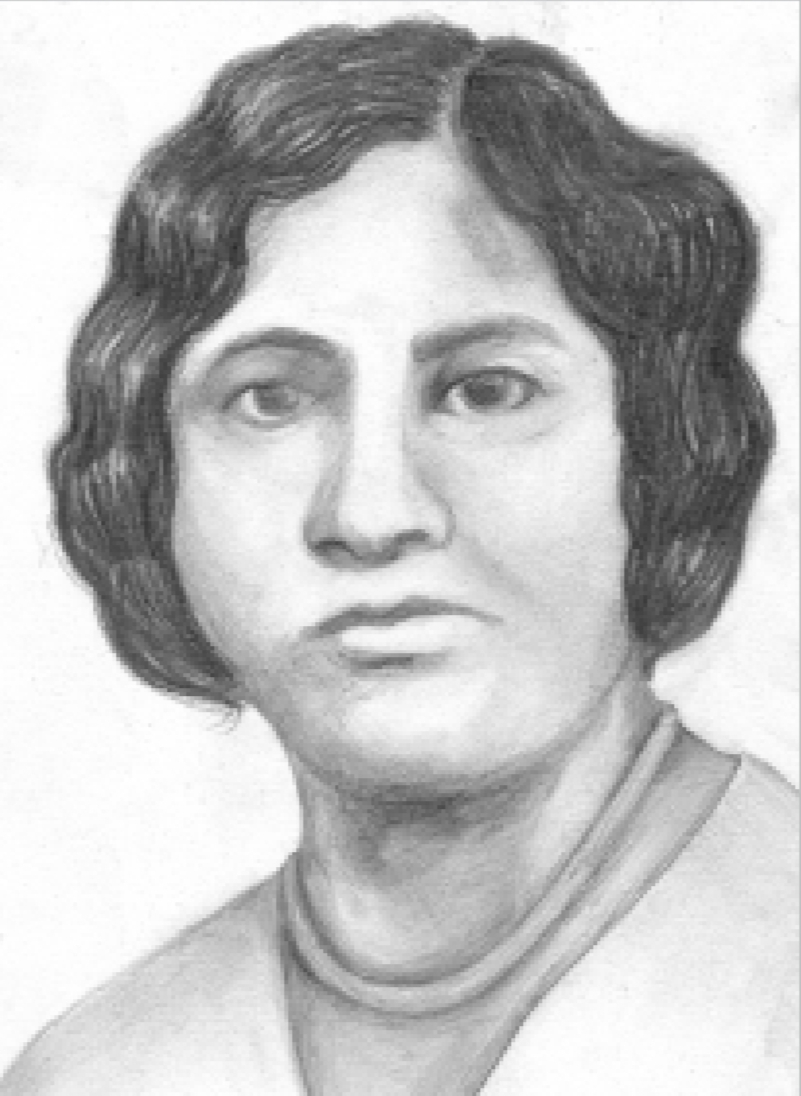
- Portrait of D'Souza
- Born: Maria Carlota D'Souza; 5 December 1902; Cunchelim, Goa, Portuguese India
- Died: Bombay (now Mumbai, Maharashtra, India)
- Occupations: Actress; singer
- Known for: Reviving women's presence on the Konkani stage

Maria Carlota D'Souza (5 December 1902 – unknown), known professionally as Miss Carlota, was a Goan theatre actress and singer who worked on the Konkani stage.

== Early life ==
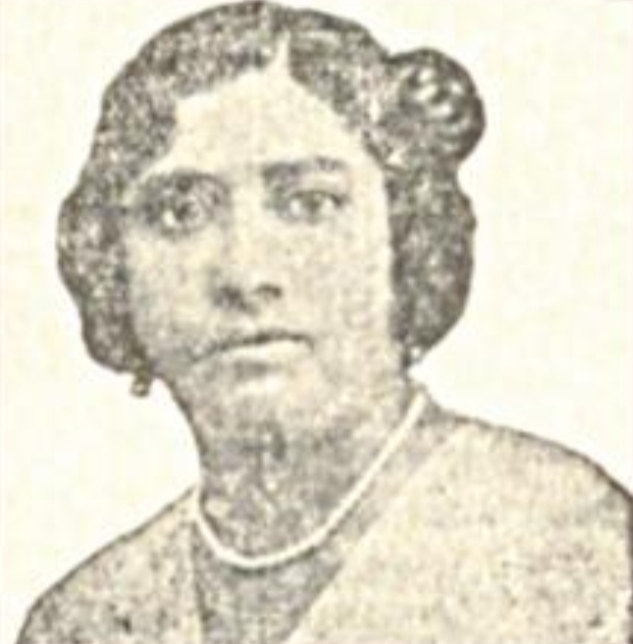
D'Souza during her youth

Maria Carlota D'Souza was born on 5 December 1902, in Cunchelim, Bardez, Goa, which was a part of Portuguese India during the era of the Portuguese Empire (now situated in India). Her parents were João Minguel and Maria Artimiza Julia Vaz. D'Souza defied societal conventions by venturing onto the tiatr stage during a time when women faced significant social stigma for such performances. She exhibited a strong passion for singing and acting from an early age. However, due to prevailing societal taboos, her talent for singing could not fully flourish, remaining largely unexplored during her childhood.

== Career ==
D'Souza played a pivotal role in revitalizing the presence of women on the Konkani stage during a period of decline. Prior to her arrival, the Konkani theater faced challenges in engaging Goan women performers, despite the efforts of directors such as João Agostinho Fernandes. These endeavors encountered limited support from Goan families, resulting in the swift departure of new female talents. Consequently, male actors assumed female roles, upholding the Konkani tiatr stage but reinforcing the absence of women. However, D'Souza's emergence marked a turning point, as she not only left an impression but also inspired other women to embrace the Konkani stage.

On 6 October 1934, D'Souza made her debut performance in Saib Rocha's tiatr production titled Son of Jerusalem at the Princess Theatre Bhangwadi in Bombay. According to writer and politician Tomazinho Cardozo, D'Souza's debut brought renewed joy and opportunities for women in Konkani theater, which had been waning. While D'Souza was preceded by individuals like Regina Fernandes, Luiza Maria, Miss Ida, Miss Adelia, Miss Etilvina, and others, their contributions failed to have a substantial impact. Over time, fewer women participated in the Konkani theater, and male actors continued to portray female characters to sustain the Konkani tiatr stage. D'Souza's 1934 debut, amidst these challenging circumstances, paved the way for Goan women to reclaim their place on the Konkani stage, as acknowledged by Cardozo. D'Souza's debut in 1934 marked a significant milestone for the Konkani stage, as it witnessed the long-awaited return of Goan women to the theatrical scene. This revival brought joy to both tiatr directors and enthusiasts alike. D'Souza's performances earned her recognition and the admiration of leading tiatr directors, who eagerly sought to cast her in their productions.

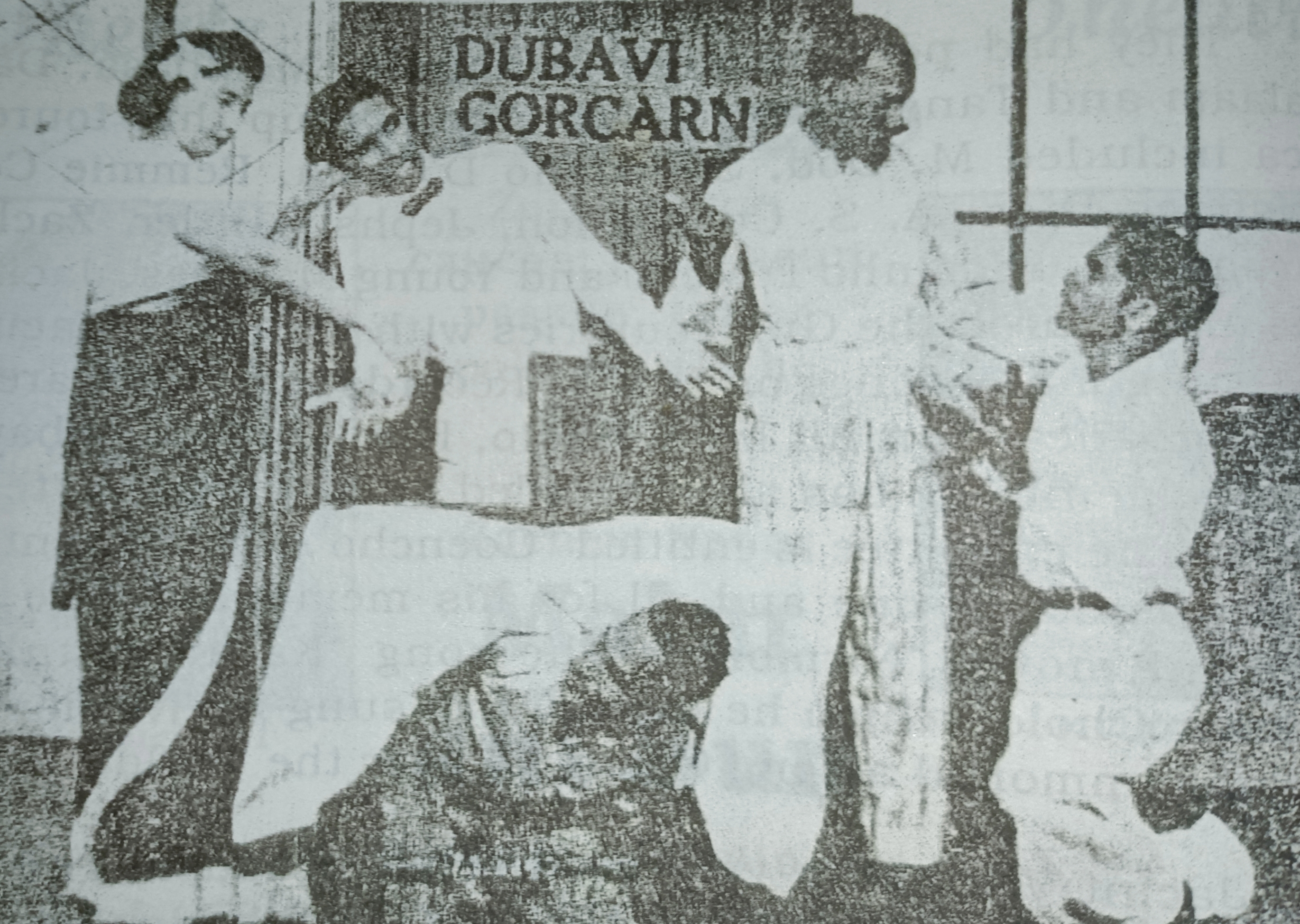
From left to right: D'Souza, Jacinto Vaz, Bartlu, A.M.B Rose & C. Alvares, performing in the tiatr Dubavi Gorcarn

A pivotal moment in D'Souza's career came when she assumed the lead role in Affonceka's tiatr, Angelin Bomboinchi Puzadkarn. Acting opposite the actor Anthony Tulu, D'Souza displayed talent and matched his performance. This particular tiatr propelled D'Souza into the spotlight, as she shared the stage with Tulu, a popular artist of that era. Recognizing her talent, Saib Rocha promptly invited her to join the Union Jack Dramatic Company and cast her in lead roles for all their productions. It was under the auspices of this company that D'Souza achieved acclaim for her portrayal of Juliet in Saib Rocha's Konkani adaptation of Shakespeare's Romeo and Juliet. Her chemistry with J. P. Souzalin, who played Romeo, garnered praise, and their performance became a memorable collaboration. D'Souza continued to shine in subsequent tiatrs alongside J.P. Souzalin, such as Conde de Monte Cruzo (Count of Monte Cruzo) and Bhott Ailolo Pomburpechea Festak (Hindu priest's arrival at Pomburpa's feast), earning accolades from audiences. J. P. Souzalin openly proclaimed D'Souza as a genuine and accomplished actress.

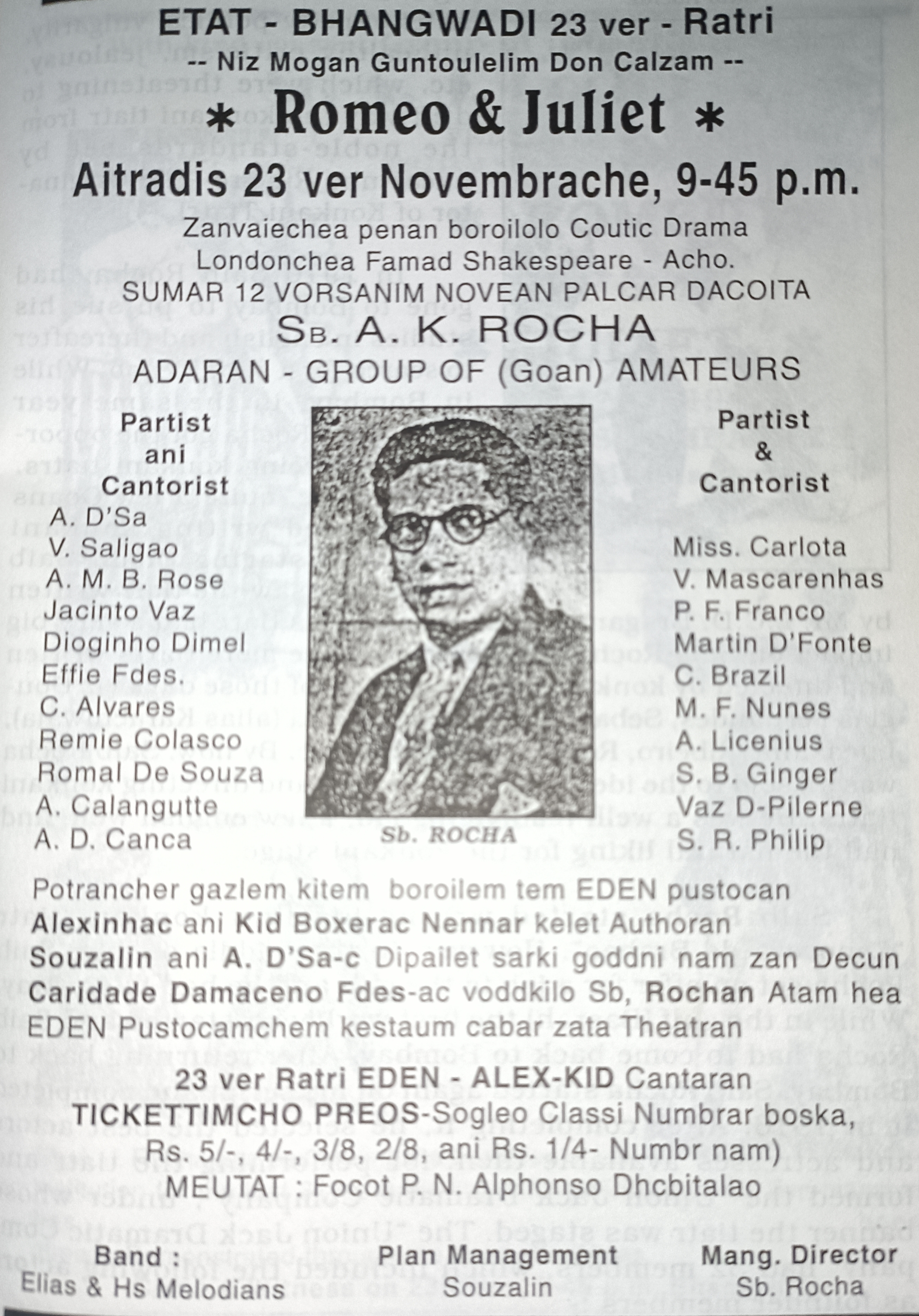
The handbill for the tiatr Romeo & Juliet, directed by Saib Rocha, features D'Souza among the cast

Konkani historian and singer Wilson Mazarello writes, D'Souza's ability to evoke deep emotions was evident in her poignant performances, often moving audiences to tears. Tomazinho Cardozo also writes, her unique singing style, frequently showcased in duets with the artiste Anthony Tulu, further enhanced her artistic repertoire. Cardozo discusses D'Souza's talents, noting that her ability to act and sing made her a highly sought-after actress on the Konkani stage. D'Souza's performances were in demand not only in Bombay but also in Poona, Goa, and Karachi (then part of British India). Cardozo emphasizes her versatility as an actor, capable of both serious and comedic roles. He also highlights her professionalism, noting her thorough preparation and ability to portray characters without needing prompting on stage.

== Death ==
D'Souza died in Bombay (present-day Mumbai) during the height of her career, leaving a void in the Konkani tiatr community. Writer and actor Tomazinho Cardozo mourned her loss, recognizing her as a significant figure whose contributions opened doors for numerous Goan women to embrace the stage, despite the setbacks they faced.

== Selected stage works ==
Year	Title	Role	Notes	Ref
1934	Son of Jerusalem		Professional debut	
	Angelin Bomboinchi Puzadkarn	Lead role		
	Romeo and Juliet	Juliet	Konkani adaptation of the original English play	
	Conde de Monte Cruzo	Lead role		
	Bhott Ailolo Pomburpechea Festak	Lead role		
	Dubavi Gorcarn	Housewife (presumably)		
