= Borda, Goa =

Borda Bodde
- suburb
- Location in Goa, India Borda (India)
- Coordinates: 15.286691°N 73.969780°E
- Country: India
- State: Goa

Languages
  - Official: Konkani
- Time zone: UTC+5:30 (IST)
- PIN: 403602
- Vehicle registration: GA
- Website: goa.gov.in

Borda is a town and suburb of the city of Margao in South Goa district in the state of Goa, India close to the city of Margao.
