= List of Hindi films of 1920 =

A list of films produced by the Bollywood film industry based in Mumbai in 1920:

== 1920 in Indian cinema ==
- Manilal Joshi, an eminent Gujarati director, quit his job as a teacher in 1920 and joined Kohinoor Film Company, learning cinematography from Vishnu B. Joshi.
- Majority of the silent films made in Indian cinema all over India including the South India states with the exception of Kerala, were mythological in context. The tales were frequently taken from the epic Mahabharata.
- Suchet Singh, a silent film director and comparable to Dadasaheb Phalke and S. N. Patankar in the pre-studio era, died in a car crash in 1920. He established the Oriental Film Company in 1919 and directed four films in 1920, Mrichhakatik based on King Shutraka's play of the same name, Rama Or Maya, Doctor Pagal and Narsinh Mehta.
- Ardeshir Irani started his first studio, Star Film Company.

== Films ==
Title	Director	Cast	Genre	Notes Cinematographer
Balika Badhu a.k.a. Baby Bride	P. T. Shaida (Tulsidutt Shaida)	Miss Ali, Tarak Bagcha, Pandit Tulsidutt Shaida	Social	Asiatic Film Corp., Calcutta
Daksha Yagna a.k.a. Sati Parvati	Vishnupant Divekar	Khalil, Prabha, Vaidya	Mythology	Kohinoor Film Company; DOP: A. P. Karandikar
Jalandhar Vrinda a.k.a. Sati Tulsi Vrinda	G. V. Sane		Mythology	Hindustan Cinema Film Co., Nasik
Kansa Vadha a.k.a. End Of The Tyrant King	G. V. Sane		Mythology	Hindustan Cinema Film Co., Nasik.
Katorabhar Khoon a.k.a.The Stinger Stung a.k.a. Zaheri Saanp	S. N. Patankar	Trymbakrao Pradhan, Tara Koregaonkar, Baba Vyas, K. G. Gokhale	Social	Patankar Friends And Co. DOP: S. N. Patankar
Krishna Sudama a.k.a. Shri Krishna Sudama	Vishnupant Divekar	Khalil, Vaidya, Prabha, Kesarbai, Moti, Sakina, Ali Miya	Mythology	Kohinoor Film Company; DOP: A. P. Karandikar
Lava Kusha	R. Nataraja Mudaliar		Mythology	Indian Film Company
Mahabharata	Rustomji Dhotiwala			Madan Theatres Ltd.
Mrichhakatik	Suchet Singh	Kanjibhai Rathod		Story by Shudraka. Oriental Film Manufacturing Co. DOP: Gajanan Devare
Narasinha Avtar	Shree Nath Patankar		Mythology	
Narsinh Mehta	Suchet Singh, Shukle	Kanjibhai Rathod	Devotional	Oriental Film Mfg. Co. DOP: Gajanan Devare
Ram Janma	G. V. Sane		Mythology	Hindustan Cinema Film Co., Nasik
Rama Or Maya	Suchet Singh, Shukle	Dorothy Kingdon, Goharjaan, Kanjbhai Rathod, Samson	Mythology	Oriental Film Manufacturing Co. DOP: Gajanan Devare
Sairandhri	Baburao Painter	Balasabeb Yadav, Zunzharrao Pawar, Kamaladevi, Balasabeb Yadav, Keshavrao Dhaiber, Baburao Pendharkar, Ganpatrao Bakre, Ansuyabai, Gulabbai, Ravi Bhaskar	Mythology	Maharashtra Film Company; DOP: S. Fattelal
Shakuntala	Suchet Singh	Dorothy Kingdon, Goharjaan, Mrs. Sutria, Samson	Mythology	Oriental Film Manufacturing Co. DOP: Baron Von Rayvon
Shakuntala	Shree Nath Patankar		Mythology drama	DOP: Shree Nath Patankar
Shri Krishna Leela	G. V. Sane		Mythology	Hindustan Cinema Film Co., Nasik
Shri Rama Janma	G. V. Sane		Mythology	Hindustan Cinema Film Co., Nasik
Sita Swayamwar a.k.a. Sita's Marriage	Shree Nath Patankar	Limaye	Mythology	Patankar and Friends Co. DOP: S. N. Patankar
The Enchanted Pills a.k.a. Vichitra Gutika	S. N. Patankar	Trymbakrao Pradhan, Marathe, Sitarampant Joshi, K. G. Gokhale, Damuanna Joshi, Dighe	Social	Patankar and Friends Co. DOP: S. N. Patankar
Vikram Urvashi	Kanjibhai Rathod	R. N. Vaidya, Lina Valentine	Mythology	Kohinoor Film Company; DOP: Vishnu B. Joshi
