= List of Hindi films of 1924 =

List of Indian Hindi language films of 1924

A list of films produced by the Bollywood film industry based in Mumbai in 1924:

== 1924 in Indian cinema ==
- Master Vithal made his debut as a dancing girl in Kalyan Khajina also called The Treasures of Khajina, directed by Baburao Painter.
- Khalil, termed as the "First Star" made his debut as a hero in Gul-E-Bakavali. He played a supporting role in the film Kala Naag.

=== Films ===
- Bismi Sadi also called 20th Century is cited as the start of melodrama films. It was directed by Homi Master and was the story of a hawker turned into a ruthless mill-owner.
- Gul-E-Bakavali was directed by Kanjibhai Rathod for Dwarkadas Sampat's Kohinoor Film Company banner. Made as a fantasy, the film was a big success breaking records and running in theatres for fourteen weeks.
- Kala Naag is a 1924 silent action thriller film directed by Kanjibhai Rathod and assisted by Homi Master. Produced under the Kohinoor Co, Bombay, it was the first "recorded example" with real-life characters based on the Champsi-Haridas Murder case in Bombay. The film aimed at a "pan-Indian" audience was a commercial success. Homi Master played the lead role.
- Poona Raided was directed by B. V. Warerkar. The film is acclaimed as one of Mama Warerkar's finest directorial ventures. The historical was based on the 17th century Maratha Emperor Shivaji's resistance and counter-attack following the raid on Poona by Aurangzeb. The film was also the debut of Sundarrao Nadkarni, in a small role.
- Prithvi Vallabh directed by Homi Master was based on K. M. Munshi's Gujarati novel Prithivivallabh. The film was a success at the box-office and was "widely acclaimed".
- Kalyan Khajina directed by Baburao Painter was a historical adventure movie based on the heroic actions of the 17th Century Maratha emperor Shivaji.
- Sati Padmini directed by Baburao Painter was about the Rajput queen Padmini of Chittor. The film received favourable reviews in the British Press when it was released at the British Empire exhibition at Wembley.
- Sati Sardarba was directed by Nanubhai Desai for his newly launched Saraswati Film Company banner. It starred Fatma Begum with Sultana and Zubeida and is stated to have become a big success commercially.

== A-J ==
Title	Director	Cast	Genre	Notes Cinematographer
Ashwathama	Dadasaheb Phalke	Bhaurao Datar, Dada Pendse, Gotiram, Madhav Malusare	Mythology	Hindustan Cinema Film Co., Nasik; DOP: Anna Salunke
Atma Bal a.k.a. Sundar Kamdar		Elizer, Asooji		Majestic Film Co.
Bal Shringee or Bal Shringi			Mythology	Eastern Film Co., Baroda
Bali Yagna	V. K. Pattani	Nanubhai, Batukbhai Vaidya	Mythology	Saurashtra Film Co., Rajkot; DOP:Champaklal Pattani
Bali Yagna a.k.a. Self-surrender At The Feet of the Master	Kanjibhai Rathod		Mythology	
Bismi Sadi a.k.a. Twentieth Century	Homi Master	Raja Sandow, Miss Moti, Noor Mohammed Charlie	Social	Kohinoor Film Co. DOP: D. D. Dabke
Bhakta Sudhanva			Devotional	Star Films Ltd. DOP: Vishnu B. Joshi
Chandan Malayagiri	Naval Gandhi			Majestic Film Co.
Chandragupta And Mahatma Chanakya a.k.a. Chandragupta Chanakya		Jilloobai, Asooji	Historical	Star Films Ltd. DOP: Vishnu B. Joshi
Chandranath	Naresh Mitra	Durgadas Bannerjee, Nirmalbala, Naresh Mitra, Jogesh Chowdhury	Social	Taj Mahal Film Co, Calcutta; DOP: Noni gopal Sanyal
Datta Janma a.k.a. Sati Ansuya	G. V. Sane	Bhaurao Datar, Bachu, Ashraben, Motiram	Devotional	Hindustan Cinema Film Co., Nasik; DOP: Anna Salunke, Chauhan
Dhruva Charitra a.k.a. The Story Of Dhruva	Jyotish Bannerjee	Patience Cooper, Dadabhai Sarkari, Signor P. Mannelli, Signorina F. Mannelli, James Mcgrath, Master Mohan, M. Monilal, Agha Hashar Kashmiri	Mythology	Select Oriental Films, Madan Theatres Ltd. DOP: Eugenio D. Liguoro
Draupadi Bhagya a.k.a. Draupadi's Fate	Raghupathy S. Prakasa		Mythology	Indian Craft Co., Madras, Hindustan Cinema Film Co., Nasik
Gajendra Moksham a.k.a. Gajendra's Nirvana	Raghupathy S. Prakasa		Mythology	Star Of the East Film Co.
Gomata a.k.a. Sacred Cow			Devotional	Madan Theatres Ltd.
Gul-E-Bakavali	Kanjibhai Rathod	Zubeida, Fatma Begum, Khalil, Sultana, Noor Mohammed Charlie, Abdul Ghani, Miss Moti, Jamuna Sr.	Legend	Kohinoor Film Company
Ishq No Umedwar				Saurashtra Film Co.
Jayadratha Vadha	G. V. Sane	Bhaurao Datar, Bachu Pawar	Mythology	Hindustan Cinema Film Co., Nasik; DOP: Anna Salunke, Chauhan

== K-R ==
Title	Director	Cast	Genre	Notes Cinematographer
Kala Naag a.k.a. Triumph Of Justice a.k.a. Kalyug Ki Sati	Homi Master	Zubeida, Fatma Begum, Khalil, Sultana, Ibrahim, Tara, Miss Moti, Savita	True-life Crime Thriller	Kohinoor Film Company; DOP: Gajanan S. Devare, D. D. Dabke
Kalyan Khajina a.k.a. The Treasures of Khajina	Baburao Painter	Sultana, Master Vithal, Kamaladevi, Nalini, Zunzharrao Pawar, Baburao Painter, Chimasaheb Bhosle, K. P. Bhave	Crime Thriller	Maharashtra Film Company, Kolhapur; DOP: S. Fattelal
Karan Ghelo a.k.a. Karan Waghela	S. N. Patankar		Historical	National Film Company; DOP: Shree Nath Patankar
Kismet Ka Shikar a.k.a. Victims Of Fate			Social	Madan Theatres Ltd.
Krishna Kumari a.k.a. Daughter Of Shripur	Gajanan S. Devare		Costume	Kohinoor Film Co.
Manorama a.k.a. Hridaya Triputi	Homi Master	Zubeida, Khalil, Sultana	Social	Kohinoor Film Co.
Mishar Rani a.k.a. Queen Of Mishar	Jyotish Bannerjee	Durgadas Bannerjee, Ahindra Choudhury, Krishnabhamini, Niharbala, Naserwanji	Costume	Madan Theatres Ltd.
Municipal Election a.k.a. Municipal Nivadnuk	Dadasaheb Phalke	Bachu Pawar, Baburao Datar, Sakharam Jadhav, Shinde	Social	Hindustan Cinema Film Co., Nasik
Nanda Batrisi a.k.a. Nand Batrishi		Dolores Berry, Asooji	Devotional	Majestic Film Co.
Nandanar a.k.a. Bhakta Nandan	Raghupathy S. Prakasa		Devotional	Star Of The East Film Co., Madras
Narsinh Mehta	Gajanan S. Devare		Biopic Devotional	Kohinoor Film Company; DOP: Gajanan S. Devare
Navin Bharat a.k.a. New India a.k.a. Naveen Bharat	Kashinath Chatterjee		Social	Madan Theatres Ltd., Calcutta
Navi Sethani a.k.a. Kanya Vikrya Ni Kahani	Homi Master		Social	Kohinoor Film Company
Paper Parinam a.k.a. Crime And Punishment		Probodh Chandra Bose, Nirmalendu Lahiri, Prabhadevi, Prabhavati	Social	Madan Theatres Ltd., Calcutta
Patni Pratap a.k.a. Wife's Achievement	J. J. Madan	Patience Cooper	Social	Madan Theatres Ltd., Calcutta
Poona Raided a.k.a. Poona Par Hallo	B. V. (Mama) Warerkar	Dulari, Sundar Rao Nadkarni, Vishnupant Pagnis, Miss Bhawani. Krishnarao Ketkar, Vishnupant Pagnis, Miss Kaiser, Baburao Sansare, Datta Varane, Shankarrao Shinde, Pandharinath Kale	Historical	Deccan Pictures Corp. DOP: Ramrao Anandkar
Prithvi Vallabh a.k.a. The Lord Of Love And Power	Manilal Joshi	P.Y. Altekar, Wagle Sandow, Fatma Begum, Zubeida, Sultana, Miss Jaina, Bhalji Pendharkar	Historical	Based on K.M. Munshi's novel of the same name. Ashoka Pictures; DOP: Vishnu B. Joshi
Prithviraj Chouhan a.k.a. Prithviraj Chauhan			Historical	Eastern Film Co., Baroda
Ra Mandlik	Homi Master	Raja Sandow, Miss Yakbal, Ganibabu, Rajababu	Historical	Kohinoor Film Co. DOP: Gajanan S. Devare
Raja Harishchandra	D.D. Dabke, Narayan Deware		Mythology	
Ranakdevi	S. N. Patankar	Tarabai Koregaonkar, C. C. Shah	Historical	National Film Co. DOP: S. N. Patankar
Razia Begum	Nanubhai Desai, Bhagwati Mishra	Raja Sandow, Jilloo	Historical	Majestic Film Company.
Repentance a.k.a. Paap No Pashchatap	Naval Gandhi	Dolores Berry, Tara	Social	Majestic Film Company.

== S-Z ==
Title	Director	Cast	Genre	Notes Cinematographer
Sadevant Savlinga			Costume	Kohinoor Film Co.
Sadguni Sushila a.k.a. Sushila The Virtuous a.k.a. Triumph Of Truth	Kanjibhai Rathod	Raja Sandow	True-life Thriller Drama	Kohinoor Film Company
Samudra Manthan a.k.a. The Churning Of The Ocean a.k.a. Ahankar Vijaya	V.K. Pattani	Batukbhai Vaidya, Nanubai	Mythology	Saurashtra Film Co., Rajkot; DOP: Champaklal Pattani
Sanyasi	Naval Gandhi		Social	Majestic Film Co.
Sati Padmini a.k.a. Beauty of Rajasthan a.k.a. Siege of Chittor	Baburao Painter	Ganpat Bakre, Balasaheb Yadav, Nalini, Zunzharrao Pawar, Dwarka, Bedi	Historical Drama	Maharashtra Film Co. DOP: S. Fattelal
Sati Sardarba	Nanubhai Desai	Fatma Begum, Sultana, Mohanlala, Putli, Zubeida	Devotional	Saraswati Film Co. DOP: Bhogilal K. M. Dave
Sati Seeta	Kanjibhai Rathod		Religious	Kohinoor Film Co. DOP: Gajanan S. Devare
Sati Sone a.k.a. Halaman Jethvo	Homi Master	Raja Sandow, Janibabu, Rajababu, Miss Moti, Jamuna Sr.	Devotional	Kohinoor Film Co.
Shah Jehan a.k.a. Shahjehan	Ardeshir M. Irani, Naval Gandhi	Bhagwati Mishra, Elizer, Jilloobai	Historical	Majestic Film Company
Shaitan Pujari			Social	Punjab Film Mfg. Co.
Sharda	Dadasaheb Phalke		Social	Hindustan Cinema Film Company, Nasik
Shivaji's Escape From Agra a.k.a. Shivajichi Agryahun Sutaka	Dadasaheb Phalke	Bhaurao Datar, Jardos, Laxman Malusare	Historical	Hindustan Cinema Film Co., Nasik; DOP: Anna Salunke
Sita Shuddhi a.k.a. Ram Ravan Yuddha a.k.a. The Purification Of Sita	G. V. Sane, Dadasaheb Phalke	Vasant Shinde, Chavan	Religious	Hindustan Cinema Film Co., Nasik; DOP: Anna Salunke
Shri Dnyaneshwar	S. N. Patankar		Devotional	National Film Company; DOP: S. N. Patankar
Sita Vanvas a.k.a. Uttar Ramcharitra	V. S. Nirantar		Religious	Hindustan Cinema Film Company, Nasik
Sharif Badmash a.k.a. Society Scoundrel	Kanjibhai Rathod	Ermeline, Madanrai Vakil, Shiraz Ali Hakim, Dorothy	Social	Saurashtra Film Co., Rajkot; DOP: Chimanlal Luhar
Sund And Upsund	G. V. Sane		Mythology	Hindustan Cinema Film Company, Nasik
The Debt Of Sin a.k.a. Paap No Fej	Ardeshir Irani, Naval Gandhi	Elizer, Bhagwati Mishra, Tara, Asooji	True-life Crime Thriller	Majestic Film Co. Bhogilal K. M. Dave
Turki Hoor	J. J. Madan	Patience Cooper, Master Mohan, Master Narmada Shankar, Surajram, Sharifa, Manilal	Costume	Madan Theatres Ltd.
Usha Swapna a.k.a. Usha's Dream	Raghupathy S. Prakasa		Mythology	Star Of The East Film Co., Madras
Vasant Prabha		Probodh Bose, M. Hussain, Kusumkumari, Prabhadevi	Social	Madan Theatres Ltd.
Veer Ahir	Homi Master	K. B. Athavale, Jamna	Legend	Kohinoor Film Co.
Veer Bharat	Jyotish Bannerjee		Costume	Madan Theatres Ltd.
Veer Durgadas a.k.a. Brave Durgadas	Bhagwati Mishra	Bhagwati Mishra, Jilloo, Asooji	Historical	Majestic Film Co.
Vijaya a.k.a. Victory a.k.a. Vijay	Bhagwati Mishra			Star Films Ltd.
Vikram Charitra a.k.a. Buddhibal	Nanubhai Desai, Dorabsha Kohla	Tara, Asubhai, Gopalji	Legend	Saraswati Film Company
Wages of Sin				Madan Theatres Ltd.
