= List of Hindi films of 1921 =

A list of films produced by the Hindi film industry based in Mumbai in 1921:

== 1921 in Indian cinema ==
- Star of the East film company was started in Madras by R. S. Prakash.

=== Films ===
- Bhakta Vidur directed by Kanjibhai Rathod and produced by Kohinoor Film Company was the first Indian cinema film to face a ban, leading to a "major censorship row". Cited by Rajadhyaksha and Willemen as "One of the most famous silent mythologicals", the film featured Vidur in Gandhian attire complete with Gandhi cap and the Khaddar shirt. The film was banned in Karachi and Madras. It had the owners of Kohinoor playing the main roles, with Dwarkadas Sampat as Vidur and Maneklal Patel as Krishna, while the role of Duryodhan was enacted by Homi Master.
- Bhisma Pratighna, Telugu film industry's first feature film, was released in 1921. The film was directed by Raghupathi Venkaya co-directed by R.S. Prakash.
- Bilat Ferat or Bilet Pherat a.k.a. England Returned was the acting debut of Dhirendranath Ganguly who co-directed and produced the film under his Indo-British Film banner. The film is the first full-length Bengali feature film. It was also stated to be the first "love story" shown in Indian cinema.
- Mahasati Ansuya also called Sati Ansuya was directed by Kanjibhai Rathod for Kohinoor Film Company. It starred Sakina and Vaidya. According to Rajadhyaksha and Willemen, the film was a success at the box office and "gained notoriety for a nude shot of Sakina".
- Nal Damayanti, a mythological, was one of the notable films of 1921. Directed by Eugenio de Liguoro for Madan Theatres, it starred Patience Cooper, E. D. Liguoro and D. Sarkari. It was cited to be the first international co-production with Italy.
- Surekha Haran was directed by Baburao Painter for Maharashtra Film Company. Painter hired V. Shantaram, who had been employed by the studio doing all-purpose jobs, to play the role of Krishna. Shantaram's acting in the film brought him into prominence leading to several small roles till Savkari Pash where he was cast in the main role.

== A-P ==
Title	Director	Cast	Genre	Notes Cinematographer
Behula	C. Legrand	Patience Cooper	Mythology	Madan Theatres Ltd.
Belgian Emperor's Visit To India	Nitin Bose		Documentary	
Bhakta Vidur	Kanjibhai Rathod	Dwarkadas Sampat, Sakina, Maneklal Patel, Homi Master, Prabhashankar, Gangaram	Devotional	Kohinoor Film Company; Gajanan S. Devare
Bilet Pherat a.k.a. England Returned	Dhirendranath Ganguly	Dhirendranath Ganguly, Manmatha Pal, Sushilabala, Kunjalal Chakraborty	Social Comedy	Indo-British Films; Jyotish Sarkar
Chandrahasa	Kanjibhai Rathod	Khalil, Tara, Moti, Savita, Dhanji	Devotional	Kohinoor Film Company
Dabbur Kelenkari	Debi Ghosh	Chani Datta		Aurora Film Company, Calcutta; Debi Ghosh
Dhruva Charitra a.k.a. The Story Of Dhruva	Jyotish Bannerjee	Patience Cooper, M. Manilal, Master Mohan, Signor P. Mannelli, Signorina F. Mannelli, James Mcgrath, Dadabhai Sarkari, Kusumkumari, Aga Hashr Kashmiri, Pestonji Madan	Mythology	Madan Theatres Ltd. DOP: Eugenio De Liguoro
King Gopichand a.k.a. Gopichand	Vishnupant Divekar	Hira Koregaonkar, Mama Bhatt	Legend	Bharat Film Company; DOP: A. P. Karandikar
Govardhan Dhari	G. V. Sane		Mythology	Hindustan Cinema Film Company, Nasik
Jagat Janani Jagadamba a.k.a. Ma Durga a.k.a. Mother Durga	Jyotish Bannerjee		Mythology	Madan Theatres Ltd. DOP: C. Legrand
Krishna Kumar a.k.a. Pradyumna	Vishnupant Divekar		Mythology	Bharat Film Company
Krishna Maya	Kanjibhai Rathod	Jamna	Mythology	Kohinoor Film Company
Mahasati Ansuya a.k.a. Sati Ansuya a.k.a. Birth Of Shri Dattatreya	Kanjibhai Rathod	Khalil, Vaidya, Sakina	Devotional	Kohinoor Film Company; DOP: Vishnu B. Joshi
Meerabai a.k.a. Mira Bai	Sisir Kumar Bhaduri	Patience Cooper, S. K. Bhaduri	Devotional	Madan Theatres Ltd.
Mohini	Sisir Kumar Bhaduri	Patience Cooper, S. K. Bhaduri	Devotional	Madan Theatres Ltd.
Nal Damayanti	E. D. Liguoro	Patience Cooper, E. D. Liguoro, D. Sarkari, K. Adajania, Albertina, Chhapgar	Mythology	Madan Theatres Ltd.
Pundalik	Ganpat Shinde		Devotional	Hindustan Cinema Film Co., Nasik
Pundalik	Kanjibhai Rathod		Devotional	Kohinoor Film Company

== R-Z ==
Title	Director	Cast	Genre	Notes Cinematographer
Ratnakar	S. N. Ray	Chunilal Dev, Shosha Mukhi, Sushila Debi	Mythology	Aurora Cinema Co.
Rukmini Haran	Kanjibhai Rathod	Khalil, Tara, Moti, Sakina, R. N. Vaidya, Gangaram	Mythology	Kohinoor Film Company; DOP: Vishnu B. Joshi
Rukmini Satyabhama a.k.a. Rukmini Kalyanam a.k.a. Rukmani Sathyabhama a.k.a. The Wedding Of Rukmani	R. Nataraja Mudaliar		Mythology	Indian Film Company, Madras
Sant Tukaram a.k.a. Tukaram	Ganpat Shinde		Devotional	Hindustan Cinema Film Co., Nasik
Sati Madalsa	S. N. Patankar		Mythology	National Film Company; DOP: Shree Nath Patankar
Sati Sulochana	G. V. Sane		Mythology	Hindustan Cinema Film Co., Nasik
Salaam Aleikum			Social	Oriental Film Company
Shani Prabhav	G. V. Sane		Mythology	Hindustan Cinema Film Co., Nasik
Shivratri	C. Legrand	Kusum Kumari, Prabodh Bose	Mythology	Madan Theatres Ltd.
Subhadra Haran	Kanjibhai Rathod		Mythology	Kohinoor Film Company; Dop; Vishnu B. Joshi
Surekha Haran a.k.a. The Elopement Of Surekha a.k.a. Surekha Abhimanyu	Baburao Painter	V. Shantaram, Vishnupant Pagnis, Baburao Pendharkar, Ravji Mhaskar, Balasaheb Yadav, Ganpat Bakre, Zunzharrao Pawar, G. R. Mane, Gajrabai	Mythology	Maharashtra Film Co., Kolhapur; DOP: S. Fattelal
Themuras & Tehmuljee a.k.a. Aflatoon			Social	Madan Theatres Ltd.
Tridandi Sanyas	Vishnupant Divekar	Soni, Limaye, Anand Shinde	Mythology	Bharat Film Company; DOP: A. P. Karandikar
Urvashi	Vishnupant Divekar	Hira Koregaonkar, Limaye, Vithabai	Mythology	Bharat Film Company; DOP: A. P. Karandikar
Valli Thirumanam a.k.a. Valli's Wedding	Whittaker		Mythology	Whittaker
Valmiki	G. V. Sane		Mythology	Hindustan Cinema Film Co., Nasik
Vikram Satva Pariksha	G. V. Sane		Mythology	Hindustan Cinema Film Co., Nasik
Vishwamitra Menaka	Kanjibhai Rathod	Ali Miyan, Jamna, Kesar, Raja Babu	Mythology	Kohinoor Film Company; DOP: Vishnu B. Joshi
Vishnu Avatar a.k.a. The Incarnations Of Lord Vishnu	Jyotish Bannerjee, C. Legrand	Patience Cooper	Mythology	Madan Theatres Ltd. DOP: C. Legrand
Yashoda Nandan a.k.a. Yashoda's Son a.k.a. Shri Radha Krishna	Dhirendranath Ganguly, Nitish Lahiri	Dhirendranath Ganguly, Sushiladevi, Manmatha Pal, Kunjalal Chakraborty, Pramodasundari, Amodini Dasi, Nitish Lahiri	Mythology	Indo-British Film Co., Calcutta Jyotish Sarkar
