= Gulebakavali =

Gulebakavali may refer to:

- Hedychium, a genus of flowering plants in the ginger family Zingiberaceae
- Epiphyllum oxypetalum, a species of cactus
- Gul-e-Bakavali (1924 film), 1924 Indian film
- Gulebakavali (1935 film), 1935 Indian Tamil-language film
- Gulebakavali (1938 film), 1938 Indian Telugu-language film
- Gul-E-Bakawali (1939 film), 1939 Indian Punjabi-language film
- Gulebakavali (1955 film), 1955 Indian Tamil-language film
- Gulebakavali Katha, 1962 Indian Telugu-language film
- Gulaebaghavali, 2018 Indian Tamil-language film

== See also ==
- The Rose of Bakawali, Indian folktale
