= List of Hindi films of 1923 =

A list of films produced by the Bollywood film industry based in Mumbai in 1923:

== 1923 in Indian cinema ==
- Seventy per cent of the silent films produced in Indian cinema till 1923 were either mythological or devotional. The Gods were represented in the mythological films, while God-men featured in the devotional. The rest thirty percent films were associated with the historical and social drama genres.
- Modhu Bose, Hindi and Bengali film director and scenarist, started his career as an actor with Madan Theatres Ltd.
- J. F. Madan, who started Madan Theatres Ltd. in 1919, died in 1923. His third son, J. J. Madan, took over the management of Madan Theatres.

=== Films ===
- Noorjehan directed by J. J. Madan and produced by Madan Theatres Ltd. was one of the notable films of 1923. It starred Patience Cooper with Albertina, Manchersha Chapgar and Ezra Mir.
- Patni Pratap, a Madan Theatres Ltd. production and directed by J. J. Madan, had actress Patience Cooper playing the first "double role" in Indian cinema.
- Savitri also called Savitri Satyavan is cited as India's "first international co-production". Directed by Giorgio Mannini and produced by Cines (Rome) and Madan Theatres, it was based on the mythological tale of Savitri Satyavan. Rina De Liguoro played the role of Savitri, while Angelo Ferrari acted as Satyavan. The film was "promoted" as Italy's most "daring" film.
- Sinhagad was directed by Baburao Painter for the Maharashtra Film Company. It was based on Hari Narayan Apte's Marathi historical novel Gad Aala Pan Simha Gela and starred Balasaab Yadav, Kamladevi, Zhunzharrao Pawar and V. Shantaram. Called "India's first full-scale historical" the story involved the Maratha Emperor Shivaji and his lieutenant Tanaji Malasure.

== A-J ==
Title	Director	Cast	Genre	Notes Cinematographer
Babruwahan	Dadasaheb Phalke	Bhaurao Datar, Sakharam Jadhav, Dada Pendse	Mythology	Hindustan Cinema Film Company, Nasik; DOP: Anna Salunke, Chauhan
Bhakta Gora Kumbhar a.k.a. Gora Kumbhar The Devout		Devotional		Hindustan Cinema Film Company
Bhakta Sudhanva			Devotional	Star Films Ltd. DOP: Vishnu B. Joshi
Buddha Dev a.k.a. Lord Buddha	Dadasaheb Phalke	Bhaurao Datar, Dada Pendse, Charubai, Anna Salunke	Biopic Religious	Hindustan Cinema Film Co. DOP: Anna Salunke
Champraj Hada			Devotional	Star Films Ltd.
Chintamoni	Dhirendranath Ganguly		Devotional	Lotus Film Co.
Durvas Shaap a.k.a. Curse Of Durvas	S. N. Patankar	Thatte, Tara Koregaonkar	Mythology	National Film Co. DOP: S. N. Patankar
Gayatri Mahatmya a.k.a. Venukumar			Mythology	Star Films Ltd. DOP: Vishnu B. Joshi
Guru Dronacharya a.k.a. Drona The Teacher	Dadasaheb Phalke	Bhaurao Datar, Charubai, Dada Pendse	Mythology	Hindustan Cinema Film Co., Nasik; DOP: Anna Salunke
Guru Machindranath a.k.a. Streeyaraj a.k.a. The Kingdom Of Women	S. N. Patankar	Trymbakrao Pradhan	Mythology	National Film Co. DOP: S. N. Patankar
Goswami Tulsidas	Kanjibhai Rathod		Biopic Devotional	Kohinoor Film Company
Janak Videhi a.k.a. King Janak	S. N. Patankar		Mythology	National Film Co. DOP: S. N. Patankar
Jara Sandha Vadha	Dadasaheb Phalke	Bhaurao Datar, Bachu Pawar, Ghanshyam Singh	Mythology	Hindustan Cinema Film Co., Nasik; DOP: Anna Salunke, Chauhan

== K-R ==
Title	Director	Cast	Genre	Notes Cinematographer
Kamale Kamini a.k.a. Kamale Kamani a.k.a. Maid Of The Lotus	Sisir Kumar Bhaduri	Sisir Kumar Bhaduri, Patience Cooper, Kusumkumari, Prabodh Bose, Tulsi Bannerjee, Rabindramohan Ray, Master E. Liguoro, Basantakumari, Akshoy Chakraborty, Nripen Bose	Mythology	Madan Theatres Ltd.
Khokha Babu a.k.a. Khokababu	Chittranjan R. Goswami	Chittaranjan Goswami, Naresh Mitra, Nagendrabala	Social Drama	Taj Mahal Film Co., Calcutta; DOP: Noni Gopal Sanyal
Kirat Arjuna	Manilal Joshi		Mythology Epic	Kohinoor Film Company
Krishna Arjuna Yuddha			Mythology	Star Films Ltd.
Krishna Toola			Mythology	Bharat Film Company
Life Of Lord Buddha			Biopic Religious	Madan Theatres Ltd.
Maan Bhanjan a.k.a. Honour Retained a.k.a. All For Love	Naresh Mitra	Durgadas Bannerjee, Naresh Mitra, Indu Mukherjee, Lila Debi, Sona Debi, Tinkari Chakraborty, Tulsi Bannerjee, Neelam Rani	Social Drama	Taj Mahal Film Co., Calcutta; DOP: Noni Gopal Sanyal
Mahananda a.k.a. Sati Mahananda	Dadasaheb Phalke		Devotional	Hindustan Film Company
Matri Sneha a.k.a. A Mother's Love	Jyotish Bannerjee	Patience Cooper, Tulsi Bannerjee, Miss Kumud, Niroda Sundari, Sushila Sundari Jr., Kalidas Debi, Akshoy Chakraborty, Amar Choudhury, Prabhadevi, Edwin Mayer	Social Drama	Madan Theatres Ltd; DOP: Jyotish Sarkar
Matsya Varah Avtar			Mythology	Star Films Ltd.
Maya Bazar	Baburao Painter	V. Shantaram	Mythology	Maharashtra Film Company
Minal Devi a.k.a. The Sin Redeemed	Kanjibhai Rathod	Khalil, Miss Moti, Tara	Social	Kohinoor Film Company; DOP: D. D. Dabke
Noorjehan a.k.a. Light Of The World a.k.a. Nurjehan	J. J. Madan	Patience Cooper, Dadibhai Sarkari, Manchersha Chapgar, Charles Creed, Ezra Mir, Albertini	Biopic Historical	Madan Theatres Ltd. DOP: Jyotish Sarkar
Raja Gopichand			Legend	Bharat Films
Raja Mayurdhwaja		Madanrai Vakil, Asooji	Mythology	Star Films; DOP: Vishnu B. Vyas

== S-Z ==
Title	Director	Cast	Genre	Notes Cinematographer
Samudra Madanam	R. S. Prakash		Mythology	
Sati Narmada	Kanjibhai Rathod, Narayan Deware			Kohinoor Film Company
Sati Veermata a.k.a. Pious Veermata	S. N. Patankar		Historical	National Film Company
Savitri a.k.a. Savitri E Satyvan Savitri Satyvan	Giorgio Mannini, J. J. Madan	Rina De Liguoro, Angelo Ferrari, Gianna Terribili-Gonzales, Bruto Castellani, Lydianne	Mythology	Madan Theatres Ltd., Cines (Rome); DOP: Gioacchino Gengarelli
Shishupal Vadha a.k.a. The Killing Of Shishupal	G. V. Sane	Bhaurao Datar, Sane, Bachu Pawar, Sonabai	Mythology	Hindustan Cinema Film Company; DOP: Anna Salunke
Shri Balkrishna a.k.a. The Child Krishna	Kanjibhai Rathod, Narayan Devare		Religious	Kohinoor Film Co.
Shri Krishna Avatar	Baburao Painter	V. Shantaram	Religious	Maharashtra Film Company
Shri Krishna Bhakta Peepaji	S. N. Patankar		Devotional	National Film Co. DOP: S. N. Patankar
Shri Krishna Satyabhama a.k.a. Krishna Satyabhama a.k.a. Samantak Mani	S. N. Patankar	Tarabai Koregaonkar, Thatte	Mythology	National Film Company
Shuk Rambha a.k.a. Shukh Deo	Kanjibhai Rathod	Khalil, Tara	Fantasy	Kohinoor Film Co.
Silent Curse a.k.a. Sati Ka Shaap	Manilal Joshi		Legend	Swastik Pictures
Sinhagad	Baburao Painter	Baburao Painter, V. Shantaram, D. Sarpotdar, Kamaladevi, Zhunzharrao Pawar, Balasaab Yadav, Nalini, K. P. Bhave, Baburao Painter, G. R. Mane	Historical Drama	Maharashtra Film Company, DOP: Sheikh Fattelal
Soul of a Slave	Hemchandra Mukherjee	Ahindra Chowdhury, Gokul Nag, Prafulla Ghosh, Jane Richards, Adele Willinsonworth, Hemchandra Mukherjee, Jugal Bose, Jyotish Mitra, Sudhir	Costume Drama	Photoplay Syndicate Of India, Calcutta; DOP: Charles Creed
The Catechist Of Kil Arni	R. S. Prakash, Thomas Gavin Duffy	Thomas Gavin Duffy	Religion	
Vaman Avatar a.k.a. Raja Bali	S. N. Patankar		Mythology	National Film Company
Vanraj Chavdo a.k.a. Vanraj Chavda			Historical Legend	National Film Company
Veer Bhimsen	Kanjibhai Rathod	Miss Moti, Tara, Raja Sandow, Sakina, Savita	Mythology	Kohinoor Film Company
Vratrasoor Vadha			Mythology	Kohinoor Film Company
Yayati	Dhirendranath Ganguly		Devotional	Lotus Film Company
