= List of Hindi films of 1929 =

A list of films produced by the Bollywood film industry based in Mumbai in 1929:

== 1929 ==
Notable events in Indian cinema in 1929:

=== Films ===
- Melody of Love (1928), a Universal production in English, was the first Talkie film shown in India at Elphinstone Picture Palace in Calcutta.
- Gopal Krishna directed by V. Shantaram was the first film produced under Shantaram's newly formed Prabhat Films. The film show-cased the opposition to the British rule in the guise of a "Hindu mythology" film.
- Prapancha Pash also called A Throw of Dice was directed by Franz Osten and financed by British Instructional Films Ltd. and the UFA Studios, Berlin. The film starred Himanshu Rai, Charu Roy and Seeta Devi. Devika Rani, who worked as an assistant set designer on this film, married Himanshu Rai the same year.
- Kapal Kundala directed by Priyanath N. Ganguly, was the first Indian film to achieve a "silver jubilee" run of 25 weeks.
- Hatim Tai directed by Prafulla Ghosh for Krishna Film Company was based on the "popular Parsi Theatre story" involving the traveller Hatim Tai and his adventures.
- Kono Vonk? also called Whose Fault? directed by Kanjibhai Rathod for Krishna Film Company, was a social film based on a story by K. M. Munshi, about a child widow marrying the lawyer who helps her.

=== Film Companies ===
- Prabhat Film Company, Kolhapur, was established in partnership between V. Shantaram, V. G. Damle, Keshavrao Dhaiber, S. Fattelal and S. Kulkarni, later joined by Baburao Pai in 1939.
- Ranjit Film Company, Bombay, was founded by Chandulal Shah.
- British Dominion Films was set up by Dhiren Ganguly and P. C. Barua, with Debaki Bose as the scriptwriter.
- Aurora Film Corporation and General Pictures Corporation (Madras) were also founded in 1929.

== A-D ==
Title	Director	Cast	Genre	Notes Cinematographer
All for Money a.k.a. Paisa Na Gulam	Prafulla Ghosh	Vishnu, Rampyari, Gulab, Takle, Haider Shah	Social	Krishna Film Company; DOP: Gordhanbhai Patel
Akalmand Bewaqoof a.k.a. Foolish Wisdom	Dada Sarkari	Dada Sarkari	Comedy	Madan Theatres
Anarbala a.k.a. Fairy of Anar	Bhagwati Mishra	Navinchandra, Zebunnisa, Ata Mohammed, Nirasha	Costume	Sharda Film Company; DOP: K. V. Machve
Apahrita a.k.a. The Kidnapped Girl	Kali Prasad Ghose	Renubala, Pafulla, Bhumen Roy, B. S. Rajhans, Amitav Ghosh, Sukriti devi, Nimai		Indian Kinema Arts, Calcutta; DOP: Noni Gopal Sanyal, Jatin Das
A Throw Of Dice a.k.a. Prapancha Pash	Franz Osten	Himanshu Rai, Seeta Devi, Charu Roy, Modhu Bose, Lala Bijoykishen, Tinkari Chakraborty, Sarada Gupta		Himansu Rai Film, U.F.A., British Instructional Films Ltd. DOP: Emil Schunemann
Baghdad Nu Baharvatiyo a.k.a. Thief of Baghdad	N. G. Devare	Jamuna, J. K. Nanda, Elizer, Rajababu, Usha, Ganibabu	Costume Action	Kohinoor United Artists; DOP:
Bahadur Baharvatiyo a.k.a. Terror of the Hills	Dhirubhai Desai	Navinchandra, Rajkumari, Kukreja	Action	Sharda Film Company; DOP: G. K. Mehta
Bangabala	Dwarka Khosla, Manomoy Bandyopadhyay	Uma Shashi, Phani Burma, Bankim Dutta, Moni Burma, Nanda Babu	Social	Graphic Arts, Calcutta; DOP: Dwarka Khosla
Baji Prabhu Deshpande a.k.a. Valley of the Immortals	Baburao Painter	V. Shantaram, B. K. Mistry, Sardar B,	Historical	Maharashtra Film Company; DOP:
Be Dhari Talwar a.k.a. Challenge	Bhagwati P. Mishra	E. Billimoria, Ermeline, Mazhar Khan, Boman Shroff, W. M. Khan, Asooji	Costume Action	Imperial Film Company
Bhedi Sawar a.k.a. Masked Cavalier	A. P. Kapoor	Master Vithal, Prabhashankar, Ata Mohammed	Action	Sharda Film Company; DOP: Naval Bhatt
Bhool Bhulaiyan	Vithaldas Panchotia			
Bicharak a.k.a. The Judge	Sisir Kumar Bhaduri	Sisir Bhaduri, Tarakumar Bhaduri, Shefalika, Sailen Choudhary, Jogesh Choudhary, Kankabati, Bishwanath Bhaduri	Social	Eastern Films Syndicate; DOP: Nitin Bose
Bilwamangal a.k.a. Bhakta Surdas	Homi Master	Neelam, Elizer, Bhopatkar, Jamuna	Devotional	Kohinoor Film Company
Bikharan a.k.a. Beggar Girl	Chandulal Shah	Keshav Narayan Kale, Gohar, Baba Vyas, Baburao Sansare, Thatte	Social	Ranjit Film Company; DOP: Pandrang S. Naik
Blood For Blood a.k.a. Raktacha Sood	Pandurang Talegiri	Jairam Desai, Gangubai, Sundarrao Nadkarni, Wamanrao Kulkarni, Baburao Gade, Dattopant Sohoni	Historical fiction	United Pictures Syndicate; DOP: Y. D. Sarpotdar
Bolti Tapeli a.k.a. Talking Pot	Dadasaheb Phalke			Hindustan Cinema Film Company, Nasik
Broken Hearts a.k.a. Zakhmi Jigar	Narayan Deware	Jamuna, Kumudini, Samson, Thomas	Costume	N. G. Deware
Chandrahasa	Dadasaheb Phalke		Historical fiction	Hindustan Cinema Film Company, Nasik
Chandramukhi a.k.a. Moon-Faced Beauty	Chandulal Shah	Gohar, Raja Sandow, Ghanshyam, R. N. Vaidya, Baba Vyas	Social	Shri Jagdish Film Company; DOP: Pandurang S. Naik
Chirag-e-Kohistan a.k.a. Lamp of the Hut	Anand Prasad Kapoor	Master Vithal, Pramoth Bose, Lobo, Prabhashankar	Social	Sharda Film Company; DOP: Naval Bhat
Choice Of A Bride a.k.a. Kishori	Haribhai Desai	Bachhu, Laxmi, Ganpat Bakre, Zhunzharrao Pawar, Baburao Gade	Social	Surya Film Company, Bangalore; DOP: D. B. Chauhan
Collegian	V. M. Gunjal	Miss Bunda, Hasam	Social	Gunjal Productions, Saee Films Production Co.
Dagakhor Dilbar a.k.a. King's Paramour		Jilloobao, Elizer	Costume Action	British India Film Co.
Daring Rathod a.k.a. Veer Rathod	Kanjibhai J. Rathod	Rampyari, Abdul Pahelwan, Haider Shah, Durga, Miss Sardar	Action, History	Krishna Film Company; DOP: Haribhai Patel
Dashrathi Ram	G. V. Sane	Durga Koregaonkar, Bhaurao Datar, Lalita Pawar, P. N. Varne, Meera, Anant Khule	Religious	Aryan Film Company; DOP: Y. D. Sarpotdar
Dilruba a.k.a. Belle of Bombay	Harshadrai Mehta	Nandram, Zebunnisa, Janibabu, Joshi, Meharbanu, Nirasha. P. N. Varne	Social	Sharda Film Company; DOP: Chimanlal Luhar
Dharma Patni a.k.a. The Ideal Hindu Wife	A. Narayan	Devaki, T. P. Kailasam,	Social	General Pictures Corporation, Madras

== E-I ==
Title	Director	Cast	Genre	Notes Cinematographer
Fairy Of Sinhaldwip a.k.a. Sinhaldweep Ki Sundari	Nanubhai Vakil	Putli, Inamdar, Manilal, Thatte	Fantasy	Ranjit Film Company; DOP: Jamnadas Subedar
Falak Numa a.k.a. Triumph of Love	Madhusudan Smart	Abdul Razaq, Miss Ricks, Faredoon, Kisan Lal, Nooman	Costume	Indira Film Company
Female Feat a.k.a. Rajwada Na Ranga	Krishna Kumar	Haidar Shah, Gulab, Rampyari, Abdul Pahelwan, Gangaram, Vishnu	Action	Krishna Film Company; DOP: Chaturbhai Patel
Friend Or Fiend a.k.a. Sanmitra Ke Shaitan	Bhaidas Kewalram	Miss Sardar, Abdul Pahelwan, Rampyari, Haider Shah	Social	Krishna Film Company; DOP: Chaturbhai Patel
Garuda Garvabhangam a.k.a. Pride of Satyabhama	A. Narayan	Y. V. Rao, Tara, Devaki	Mythology	General Pictures Corpn.
Gnana Sundari	A. Narayan		Fantasy	General Pictures Corpn.
Gopal Krishna	V. Shantaram	Suresh, Kamaladevi, Anant Apte, Sakribai, G.R. Mane	Religious	Prabhat Film Company; DOP: S. Fattelal
Gori Bala a.k.a. Hell's Paradise	P. Y. Altekar	Kamala, Nayampally, Jilloobai, Mubarak, Winnie Stewart	Costume	Imperial Film Company; DOP: A. P. Karandikar
Gulshan-e-Arab a.k.a. Arabian Garden	K. P. Bhave	E. Billimoria, Ermeline, Gohar, Jamshedji, Khansaheb, Sakhu	Fantasy	Imperial Film Company; DOP: Rustom Irani
Hatimtai	Prafulla Ghosh	Rampyari, Rosy, A. R. Pahelwan, Apte, Motibai, Leslie, Durga, Nizam, Miss Hormez	Fantasy Action	Krishna Film Company; DOP: Chaturbhai Patel
Hawai Sawar a.k.a. Flying Prince	Mohan Dayaram Bhavnani	D. Billimoria, Maya, Diana, Mazhar Khan, Jilloobai, Baburao Chinchgar	Fantasy Costume Action	Imperial Film Company; DOP: Rustom Irani
Heart Of King a.k.a. Raj Hriday	Haribhai Desai	Laxmi, Ganpat Bakre, Baburao Gade, Zhunzharrao Pawar, K. Rangarao	Action	Surya Film Company
Heer Ranjha a.k.a. Hoor-e-Punjab	R. S. Choudhry, Pesi Karani	A. R. Kardar, D. Billimoria, Sulochana (Ruby Myers), Jamshedji, Ismail, Faruki	Legend Romance	Imperial Film Company; DOP: Adi Irani
His Old Debt a.k.a. Mard Ki Zabaan	N. G. Kamatmurkar	Sundarrao Nadkarni, Gangubai, Wamanao Kulkarni, V. S. Bapat		United Pictures Syndicate; DOP: Pandurang Talegiri
Husn Ka Daku a.k.a. Mysterious Eagle	A. R. Kardar	A. R. Kardar, Gulzar, Iris Crawford, M. Ismail, G. R. John and Ghulam Qadir	Action Adventure	Playart Phototone; DOP: D. D. Dabke
Indira B.A.	Rama Choudhary	Sulochana (Ruby Myers), Mehtab, Jilloobai, Jamshedji, Dinkar Bidkar, Salvi, Asooji, Sakubai	Social	Imperial Film Company; DOP: Adi Irani

== J-K ==
Title	Director	Cast	Genre	Notes Cinematographer
Jai Bharati a.k.a. Young India		Navinchandra, Sultana, Zubeida, Promoth Bose, C. C. Shah	Social	Indulal Yagnik; Dop: Naval Bhat
Jai Somnath	Harshadrai Mehta	Keshav Narayan Kale, Gulab, Rampyari, Baburao Apte, Ibrahim, Haider Shah, Shanta	Devotional	Krishna Film Company; DOP:Chimanlal Luhar
Jawani Diwani a.k.a. Flaming Youth	Nandlal Jaswantlal	Kumudini, Hira, Panna, Thomas	Action	Kohinoor United Arts; DOP: K. G. Gokhale
Jayant	Nagendra Majumdar	Madanrai Vakil, Gohar, Mehtab, Salvi		Kaiser-e-Hind Film Company; DOP: Ambadas Pawar
Jewel Of Rajputana a.k.a. Mewad Nu Moti	B. P. Mishra	D. Billimoria, Sulochana (Ruby Myers), Mazhar Khan, Jilloobai, Madanrai Vakil	Historical	Imperial Film Company; DOP: Rustom Irani
Jugalanguria	Jyotish Bannerjee	Tarakbala, Tulsi Bandyopadhyay, Light Alias		Madan Theatres Ltd.
Kacha Devayani a.k.a. Kacha and Devayani	Dadasaheb Phalke			Hindustan Cinema Film Co., Nasik
Kanak Tara	Fatma Begum	Fatma Begum, Shahzadi, Sultana, Zubeida		Fatma Film Corporation
Kapal Kundala	Priyanath Ganguly (P. N. Ganguly)	Seeta Devi, Indira Devi, Patience Cooper, Tulsi Banerji, Probodh Bose, Naresh Mitra, Dani Babu, Lalita Devi	Social	Based on Bankimchandra Chattopadhyay novel. First film to celebrate "siver jubilee" (25 weeks) in India. Madan Theatres Ltd. DOP: Signor Marconi
Karuna Kumari	Harshadrai Mehta	Master Vithal, Zebunisa, Prabhashankar, Balabhai, Lobo	Historical	Sharda Film Company; DOP: Naval Bhat
Khwab-e-Hasti a.k.a. Magic Flute	M. Bhavnani (Mohan Dayaram Bhavnani)	Sulochana (Ruby Myers), Dinshaw Bilimoria, Gohar, Diane Belle, Mazhar Khan, Baburao Sansare, Rustom Irani, Ghori	Fantasy	Imperial Film Company; DOP: Adi Irani
Khedda	M. Bhavnani		Documentary	
Khooni Kon? a.k.a. Not Guilty	Saqi	Umar, Saqi, Sayani Atish	Suspense	Little Film Co.
Kodandhari Ram a.k.a. Seeta Swayamwar		Sundarrao Nadkarni, Hansa, Jairam Desai, Wamanrao Kulkarni, Gangubai	Religious	United Pictures Syndicate
Kono Vank? a.k.a. Whose Fault?	Kanjibhai Rathod	Keshav Narayan Kale, Gulab, Baburao Apte	Social	Krishna Film Company; DOP: Gordhanbhai Patel
Kovalan a.k.a. Fatal Anklet	A. Naraynan, Raghupathy S. Prakash	Devaki, T. P. Rajalakshmi	Epic	General Pictures Corpn.
Krishna Kausalya a.k.a. Imitator			Devotional	Mahavir Photoplays, Hyderabad
Kumud Kumari	Nanubhai Vakil, R. N. Vaidya	R. N. Vaidya, Shanta Kumari, Putli Baba Vyas, Inamdar, Manilal, Dabir	Social	Shri Jagdish Film Corporation; DOP: Bimal C. Mitra, Jamnadas Subedar
Kusumlata a.k.a. Lily of the Valley	Dhirubhai Desai	Master Bachu, Jayram Desai, Gangubai, P. N. Varne, Wamanrao Kulkarni, Durga Koregaonkar, R. Budhker	Costume	Suvarna Pictures; DOP: K. V. Machve

== L-N ==
Title	Director	Cast	Genre	Notes Cinematographer
Lanka Lakshmi	Homi Master	Fatma Begum, Panna, Khalil, Noor Mohammed Charlie, Jamuna, Neelam		Kohinoor United Artists; DOP: K. G. Gokhale
Law of Love a.k.a. Prem Pash	Dinkar Bidkar	Lalita Pawar, Bhaurao Datar, Rajkumari, Madhav Kale, Himmat, Jadhavrao		Aryan Film Company
Lutaru Lalna a.k.a. Dacoit's Damsel	Homi Master	Noor Mohammed Charlie, Jamuna, Ibrahim, Heera, Fatma Jr.	Action	Kohinoor United Artists; DOP: Vishnu Vyas
Madhu Bansari	A. P. Kapoor	Nandram, Zebunisa, Lobo, Joshi	Fantasy	Sharda Film Company; DOP: Naval Bhat
Maha Sundar		Fatma Begum, Zubeida, Sultana, Yakub, Shahzadi, Ata Mohamed, Jani Babu	Social	Precious Pictures Corp. DOP: Ambadas Pawar
Malati Madhav	Dadasaheb Phalke	Krishna Kumbhar, Anasuya		Hindustan Cinema Film Co., Nasik
Malavikagni Mitra	Dadasaheb Phalke	Krishna Kumbhar, Shakuntala, Kishori Pathak		Hindustan Cinema Film Co., Nasik
Mard Ki Zabaan a.k.a. His Old Debt	N. G. Kamatmurkar	Sundarrao Nadkarni, Gangubai, Wamanao Kulkarni, V. S. Bapat	Social	United Pictures Syndicate; DOP: Pandurang Talegiri
Maurya Patan a.k.a. Fall of the Mauryas	R. S. Choudhary	Elizer, Zebunisa, Jilloobai, Madanrai Vakil, Putli	Historical	Royal Art Studio
Mayavi Nagari a.k.a. The Magic City	Dhirubhai Desai	Mumtaz, Promoth Bose	Fantasy	Young India Pictures; DOP: G. K. Mehta
Midnight Girl a.k.a. Nisha Sundari	Moti B. Gidwani	Kamala Devi, Bhagwat, Gulab, Sarojini, Shinde, Nimbalkar	Costume	Maharashtra Film Corporation, Kolhapur; DOP: D. G. Gune
Milan Dinar a.k.a. Prem Ni Kasoti	Fatma Begum	Fatma Begum, Yakub, Zubeida, Jani Babu, Shahzadi, Aziz	Costume Action	Victoria Fatma Film Co.
Mirza Sahiban	B. P. Mishra (Bhagwati Mishra)	Zebunissa, Master Vithal, Ata Mohammed, Nandram, P. R. Joshi, Meher Banu	Legend Romance	Sharda Film Company; DOP: K. V. Machwe
Miss Dolly	Harshadrai Mehta	Rampyari, Noor Mohammed Charlie, Pingle, Bapurao Apte, Gangaram, Durga Koregaonkar, Haridas, Abhyankar	Social	Krishna Film Company; DOP: Chimanlal Luhar
Mumbaino Mawali a.k.a. The Blackguard	Saqi	Saqi, Sayani, Umar, Gulzar, Master Rehman, Mohanlala	Action	Little Film Co. DOP: Saqi
Mumbaino Satodio a.k.a. Speculator a.k.a. Bombay's Gentleman	N. G. Devare, Vaidya	R. N. Vaidya, Jamuna, Jijibhai, Mary, Thomas, Kumudini	Social	Kohinoor Film Company; DOP: Bimal C. Mitra
Mysterious Prince a.k.a. Prince Thaksen	G.P. Pawar	Lalita Pawar, Ghodke, Nandram, Amboo, Bhaurao Dattar, Jadhavrao Pahelwan	Legend	Aryan Film Company
Naseeb Ni Devi a.k.a. Goddess of Luck	Fatma Begum	Begum Fatma, Sultana, Zubeida	Social	Victoria Fatma Film Co.
Naseeb Ni Nakhara a.k.a. Shattered Hopes	Vithaldas Panchotia	Vithaldas Panchotia, Zebunisa, Ata Mohammed, Nirasha, Lobo, Mehar Banu	Social	Sharda Film Company; DOP: Naval Bhat
Natun Janma a.k.a. New Birth	Dwarka Khosla			
Nishan Danka a.k.a. Flag Of Honour	Dhirubhai Desai	Master Vithal, Zebunisa, Prabhashankar, Lobo, Ata Mohammed, Joshi, P. N. Varne	Action	Sharda Film Company; DOP: K. V. Machwe

== P ==
Title	Director	Cast	Genre	Notes Cinematographer
Pardesi Saiyan a.k.a. The Lovers	Nandlal Jaswantlal	Fatma Begum, Khalil, Shantakumari, Kumudini, Aziz	Costume	Kohinoor Film Company; DOP: K. G. Gokhale
Parijatak a.k.a. The Flower of Heaven	N. D. Sarpotdar	Lalita Pawar, Bhaurao Datar, Durga Koregaonkar, Meera, Jadhavrao	Fantasy	Aryan Film Company
Parivartan a.k.a. Revolution in Life	Prafulla Ghosh	Rampyari, Haider Shah, Durga Koregaonkar, Baburao Apte	Social	Krishna Film Company; DOP: Gordhanbhai Patel
Pati Patni a.k.a. Husband Wife	Chandulal Shah	Keshav Narayan Kale, Gohar, Mubarak, Raja Sandow, Baba Vyas	Social	Ranjit Film Company; DOP: Pandurang S. Naik
Pitru Prem a.k.a. A Father’s Love	Harilal M. Bhatt	Gaby Hill, Miss Mani, Y. L. Chichulkar, Dave, Yusuf, Madanlal, S. P. Niphadkar	Social	Mahavir Photoplays, Hyderabad
Prabhavati	G. V. Sane			Hindustan Cinema Film Co., Nasik
Prem Yatra a.k.a. Pilgrims of Love	Ramakant Gharekhan, Vaidya	Shantakumari, R. N. Vaidya, Baba Vyas	Social	Shree Jagdish Film Company; DOP: G. G. Gogate
Prithviraj Sanyogita	N. D. Sarpotdar	Lalita Pawar, Bhaurao Datar, Durga Koregaonkar, Meera, Jadhavrao, Ghodke, C. R. Das	Historical Legend	Aryan Film Company; DOp; N. D. Sarpotdar
Punjab Kesari a.k.a. Lion of Punjab	Homi Master	Raja Sandow, Bulbule, Panna, Fatma Jr., Bhopatkar	Action	Kohinoor United Artists; DOP: Vishnu Vyas
Punjab Mail	R. S. Choudhary	Dinshaw Billimoria, Sulochna (Ruby Myers), Jal Merchant, P. Gidwani, Gohar Jr., Zaverbhai Kaiser, Tara	Action	Imperial Film Company; DOP: Adi Irani
Punya Prabhav	Homi Master	Fatma Begum, Tara Khalil, R. N. Vaidya, Jamuna		Kohinoor United Artists; DOP: Vishnu Vyas
Pyari	Bimal Pal	Ardhendu Bandyopadhyay, Kalipada Das, Chandravati Devi, Nilamani De	Social	Movie Producers Co., Calcutta; DOP: Bimal Pal

== Q-R ==
Title	Director	Cast	Genre	Notes Cinematographer
Radio Girl	Baren Roy	Baren Roy, Pratibha, Miss Vedi	Social	Indira Film Company
Rajani	Jyotish Bannerjee	Manoranjan Bhattacharya, Tarakbala, Durgadas, Leelavati, Satyen Dey, Shashimukhi	Social	Madan Theatres Ltd. DOP: Manglu
Raj Dharma a.k.a. Prince of the People	Harilal M. Bhatt	Shankar, Miss Mani	Costume	Mahavir Photoplays, Hyderabad
Raj Hansa a.k.a. The Royal Swan	K. Rathod	Rampyari, Haider Shah, Vishnu, Gulab, Ibrahim, Miss Sardar	Costume	Krishna Film Company
Rajput Sawar a.k.a. Rajput Cavalier	Ramakant Gharekhan	Madhuri, Kapoor, Manorama, Master Mohan, Ramesh Niranjan, Mumtaz	Costume	Young India Pictures; DOP: Barodekar
Rajputani a.k.a. Woman From Rajputana	Chandulal Shah	Dinshaw Billimoria, Gohar, Baba Vyas, Baburao Sansare, Thatte	Costume	Ranjit Film Company; DOP: Pandurang S. Naik
Raj Ramani a.k.a. Vanishing Hopes	B. P. Mishra	E. Billimoria, Ermeline, Mazhar Khan	Action	Imperial Film Company; DOP: Adi Irani
Raj Sanyas		Gangubai, Sakhu, Wamanrao Kulkarni	Costume	United Pictures Syndicate
Ramdas			Devotional	Peninsular Film Services, Madras
Rana Garjana a.k.a. What Price Loyalty?	Harshadrai Mehta	Zebunisa, Nandram, Vithaldas Panchotia, Ata Mohammed	Costume Action	Sharda Film Company; DOP: Chimanlal Luhar
Rank Nu Ratan a.k.a. The Saviour	A. P. Kapoor	Prabha Shankar, Promoth Bose, Miss Mani, Master Vithal, Lobo	Social	Sharda Film Company; DOP: Naval Bhat
Reclamation a.k.a. Patitodhar	N. D. Sarpotdar	V. Shantaram, Lalita Pawar, Amboo, Durgabai Koregaonkar, Jadhavrao	Action	Aryan Film Co. DOP: Y. D. Sarpotdar
Red Signal a.k.a. Lal Vavto	K. P. Bhave	E. Billimoria, Baburao Sansare, Mazhar Khan, Ermeline	Action	Imperial Film Company
Roaring Lion a.k.a. Sinh Ka Bachha Sinh	Homi Master	Elizer, Heera, Jamuna, Bulbule, Ghanshyam Singh	Costume	Kohinoor United Artists; DOP: Vishnu Vyas
Rukmini Haran	Kanjibhai J. Rathod	Gulab, Vishnu	Mythology	Krishna Film Company; DOP: Maneklal Patel

== S ==
Title	Director	Cast	Genre	Notes Cinematographer
Sant Meerabai a.k.a. Saint Mira	Dadasaheb Phalke	Shakuntala	Devotional	Hindustan Cinema Film Co., Nasik
Satta No Mad a.k.a. Wages of Virtue	Harshadrai Mehta	Jani Babu, Navinchandra, Prabha Shankar, Ata Mohammed, Lobo	Social	Mehta-Luhar Productions, Suresh Films Co. Ltd. DOP: Chimanlal Luhar
Shahi Chor a.k.a. Wonderful Prince	Jani Babu, Fatma Begum	Fatma Begum, Shahzadi, Zubeida	Costume	Victoria Fatma Film Co. DOP: Pranjivan Shukla
Shashikala a.k.a. Tit For Tat	B. P. Mishra (Bhagwati Mishra)	Jilloobai, Putli	Social	Lokmanya Film Company, Royal Art Studio
Shiraz a.k.a. Das Grabmal Einer Groszen Liebe	Franz Osten	Himanshu Rai, Charu Roy, Enakshi Rama Rau, Seeta Devi	Epic Historical romance	British Instructional Films, Himansu Rai Film, UFA; DOP: Emil Schunemann, H. Harris
Shiraz-Ud-Dowla		Zebunissa, Master Vithal, Jani Babu	Historical	International Pictures Corpn.
Shirin Khusru	R. S. Choudhary	Jamshedji, Khansaheb, Mehboob Khan, Vakil, Gohar	Legend Romance	Imperial Film Company, New Excelsior Film
Shri Balaji	G. V. Sane	Raja Sandow, Lalita Pawar, Amboo, Bhaurao Datar, Das	Devotional	Aryan Film Co. DOP: Y. D. Sarpotdar
Shri Kanyaka Parameshwari	Raghupathy S. Prakasa		Devotional	Guarantee Pictures Corp., Madras
Sinhaldweep Ki Sundari a.k.a. Fairy of Sinhaldwip	Nanubhai Vakil	Putli, Manilal, Bhagwat, Inamdar, Thatte	Fantasy	Ranjit Film Company; DOP: Jamnadas Subedar
Sneh Samadhi a.k.a. Martyrs of Love	Ramakant Ranganath, Gharekhan	Manorama, Dhansukhlal Mehta, Dilp Raiji	Social	Artists Union; DOP: Barodekar
Sorathi Shamsher a.k.a. Noblesse Oblige	Indulal Yagnik, Dhirubhai Desai	Mohini, Ramesh Niranjan	Costume	Young India Pictures
Stage Girl	R. S. Prakash		Social	Guarantee Pictures Corpn., Madras
Subhadra Haran	N. D. Sarpotdar	Lalita Pawar, Amboo, Bhaurao Datar, Meera, Durga Koregaonkar	Mythology	Aryan Film Co. DOP: Y. D. Sarpotdar
Sukumari a.k.a. Good Girl	Ambuj Prasanna Gupta	Nawabzada Nasarullah, Syed Abdus Sobhan	Social	Cited as first film produced in what is now Bangla Desh. Not released for public screening. Dhaka Nawab family (Dhaka East Bengal Cinematograph Company); DOP: Khwaja Azad
Sword To Sword a.k.a. Talwar Ka Dhani	R. S. Choudhary	Sulochana (Ruby Myers), Jal Merchant, Yusuf, Jilloobai, Rustomji	Costume	Imperial Film Company; DOP: Adi Irani

== T-Z ==
Title	Director	Cast	Genre	Notes Cinematographer
Tal Bhairav				Omkar Pictures
Talwar Ni Dhare	Maneklal Joshi	Kale, Roshanara	Action	Atmanand Studio
Tawangar Ni Talwar	M. Udwadia	Miss Janaki, Udwadia, Mumtaz	Action	Vivekanand Pictures; DOP: V. B. Jagtap
Tarun Tapaswini a.k.a. Young Ascetic	Prafulla Ghosh	Gulab, Durga Koregaonkar, Abdul Pahelwan, Vishnu, Takle, Ibrahim	Social	Gujarat Studio Productions; DOP: Chaturbhai Patel
The Symbolesque	Ezra Mir			
Ulfat-e-Mohammed a.k.a. Loves of Prince Mohammed	N. G. Devare, Nandlal Jaswantlal	Khalil, Jamuna, Noor Mohammed Charlie, Panna	Costume	Kohinoor United Artists, N. G. Devare Production Co. DOP: Vishnu Vyas
Vasvadatta a.k.a. Sona No Suraj	Nagendra Majumdar	Putli, K. B. Athavale, Jani Babu, Salvi		Kaiser-E-Hind Film Co. DOP: Ambadas Pawar
Vasant Padmini				South Indian Films Of Sholapur
Vasantsena	Dadasaheb Phalke	Shakuntala Jadhav, Jaikishen Nanda, Gotiram		Hindustan Cinema Film Co, Nasik; DOP: Anna Salunke
Veer Baji				Omkar Films
Veer Haq a.k.a. The Triumph	Anand Prasad Kapoor (A. P. Kapoor)	Bachhu, Tara, Ata Mohammed, Lobo, Promoth Bose	Historical	Vishnu Film Co. DOP: Naval Bhat
Veer Garjana a.k.a. Reward Of Blind Passion	Nanubhai Desai	Master Vithal, Kumudini, Prabhashankar	Costume	Sharda Film Company; DOP: Naval Bhat
Veer Pujan a.k.a. Hero Worship	Nanubhai Vakil	Shanta Kumari, Inamdar, Dabir	Costume	Kohinoor United Artists, Shree Jagdish Film Co. DOP: Bimal C. Mitra
Warrior a.k.a. Rangilo Rajput	A. P. Kapoor	Master Vithal, Zebunissa, Prabha Shankar, Lobo, Ata Mohammed	Costume	Sharda Film Company; DOP: Naval Bhat
Wedding Night a.k.a. Vasal Ki Raat	P. Y. Altekar	P. Y. Altekar, Nayampally, Mazhar Khan, Muarak, Jilloobai	Social	Imperial Film Company; DOP: A. P. Karandikar
Zeheri Saap				New Excelsior Film Co.
