= List of Hindi films of 1926 =

A list of films produced by the Bollywood film industry based in Mumbai in 1926:

== 1926 in Indian cinema ==
- 106 films were produced in 1926. About 300 cinema theatres existed all over India by 1926, along with several "travelling bio-scopes". According to Amitabh Bachchan in his article for the Hindustan Times "90% of the films shown were imported from Hollywood, almost exclusively from Universal Studios".
- Fatma Begum became the first woman director of Indian cinema when she produced and directed Bulbule Paristan.
- The first cinema trade organisation called The Bombay Cinema and Theatre Trade Organisation was formed in India in 1926.
- Films had their "main title" in English followed by the regional Indian language title.
- Sulochana (Ruby Myers), made her debut with The Telephone Girl and became one of the popular stars of the 1920s and early 1930s.
- Kanan Devi also called Kanan Bala, started her acting career at the age of ten in the film Joydev directed by Jyotish Bannerji for Jyoti Studios. She went on to become one of the early singer-actor of Hindi and Bengali cinema.
- Zebunissa, known also as Zebu, started her acting career with Royal Art Studio in 1926, and remained with the company until it closed down around 1940.

=== Films ===
- Bulbule Paristan was the first Indian cinema film to be directed by a woman director Fatma Begum. The film was produced under her recently formed Fatma Films and starred herself and her three daughters Zubeida, Sultana and Shahzadi.
- The Telephone Girl was noted as a film that made "Pioneering use of real locations", It was directed by Homi Master for Kohinoor Film Company and was the debut film of real-life telephone operator, Sulochana (Ruby Myers).
- Typist Girl was directed by Chandulal Shah for the Kohinoor Film Company and starred Sulochana, Raja Sandow and Gohar. A social film, it was commercially as successful as the mythology films produced at that time.
- The Vamp directed by Naval Gandhi for Sharda Film Company and starring Miss Yakbal has been cited as a "Modern Girl" film along with The Telephone Girl.

=== Film Companies ===
- Imperial Film Company founded by Ardeshir Irani, who was to later make the first Talkie film Alam Ara (1931).
- Fatma Films was founded by Fatma Begum and the name later changed in 1928 to Victoria-Fatma Films.
- Punjab Film Corporation was set up in Lahore.

== A-C ==
Title	Director	Cast	Genre	Notes Cinematographer
Abala Rani a.k.a. The Queen Who Would Not Speak	S. N. Patankar	Zubeida	Abola	Pioneer Film Co. DOP: Shree Nath Patankar
A Crown For Two Days a.k.a. Be Din Nu Badshah	Harshadrai Mehta	Gulab, Nandram, Ermeline, Himmatlal, Vishnu	Social	Kohinoor Film Company; DOP: Chimanlal Luhar
Ajab Kumari	Manilal Joshi	Miss Mary, Mohanlala, Daji	Costume	Sharda Film Company; DOP: Naval Bhat
Amar Asha a.k.a. Immortal Hope	Harshadrai Mehta	Ermeline, Gulab, Nandram	Historical	Krishna Film Company; DOP: Chimanlal Luhar
Asha a.k.a. Hope a.k.a. Andhli Phool Wali	Rama S. Chowdhury	Nagendra Majumdar, Putli, Ghory, Baba Vyas, K. B. Athavale	Social	Laxmi Pictures Co. DOP: Pandurang S. Naik
Balaji Nimbalkar	Dadasaheb Phalke	Vasant Shinde, Bhaurao Datar, Dattopant Sakte, Krishna Chauhan	Historical	Hindustan Cinema Film Co., Nasik; DOP: Telang
Bhagwa Zenda a.k.a. The Orange Flag	K. P. Bhave	Elizer, Madanrai Vakil, Asooji, Baburao Sansare	Historical	Royal Art Studio; DOP: Rustom Irani
Bhakta Prahlad a.k.a. Devout Prahlad	Dadasaheb Phalke	Bhaurao Datar, Bachu, Yamuna Gole, Gangaram	Devotional	Hindustan Cinema Film Co., Nasik; DOP: Anna Salunke
Bhasmasur Vadh a.k.a. Prithvi Putra	G. S. Devare	Raja Sandow, Gohar	Social	Kohinoor Film Company
Bolti Bulbul a.k.a. The Talking Nightingale a.k.a. Shahi Fakir	Dhirubhai Desai	Zebunissa, Anil Kumar, Mumtaz Begum	Fantasy	Vishnu Paradise; DOP: K. C. Verma
Briefless Barrister	Homi Master	Gohar, Moti, Putli, Siddimiya	Social	Kohinoor Film Company
Bulbule Paristan a.k.a. The Nightingale From The Land Of Fairies	Fatma Begum	Fatma Begum, Madanrai Vakil, Madame Tosca, Zubeida, Sultana, Putli, K. B. Athavale, Miss Fiske	Fantasy	Fatma Film Co; DOP: Pandurang Naik, Rustom Irani
Burkhawali a.k.a. Veiled Enemy	Kanjibhai Rathod	Ermeline, Nandram, Haider Shah		Krishna Film Company; DOP: Chaturbhai Patel
Chatra Bakavli	S. N. Patankar		Fantasy	Pioneer Films Company
Cinema Queen a.k.a. Love's Sacrifice a.k.a. Cinema Queen	M. D. Bhavnani	Sulochana, Putli, Khalil	Social	Kohinoor Film Company; DOP: V. B. Joshi

== D-J ==
Title	Director	Cast	Genre	Notes Cinematographer
Delhi No Thug a.k.a. Thief Of Delhi	Homi Master	Gohar, Khalil	Costume	Kohinoor Film Company; DOP: Narayan Devare, K. G. Gokhale
Dha Cha Maa a.k.a. Murder Of Narayanrao Peshwa	N. D. Sarpotdar	Dinshaw Bilimoria, Bandopant Sohoni, Durgabai Koregaonkar, Sundarrao Nadkarni, P. N. Varne, Wamanrao Kulkarni, Jayarampant, Datoba Rajwade	Historical	United Pictures Syndicate; DOP: Pandurang Talegiri
Dharma Patni a.k.a. The Wife	Jyotish Bannerjee	Patience Cooper, Durgads Bannerji, Kartik Dey	Social	Madan Theatres Ltd.
Dhanurbhanga a.k.a. The Marriage of Janaki a.k.a. Janaki Swayamwara	Dadasaheb Phalke		Mythology	Hindustan Cinema Film Co., Nasik
Dil Aram	Nanubhai Desai	A. P. Kapoor, Dwarkee, Miss Mary, Prabhashankar, Janibabu	Historical	Sharda Film Company; DOP: Naval Bhatt
Dulari	Manilal Joshi	Elizer, Baburao Sansare, Putli, Madanrai Vakil, M. Udvadia, Jilloobai, Yusuf	Historical	Saraswati Film Co. DOP: A. P. Karandikar
Dagabaaz Duniya a.k.a. Way Of The World	Harihar Diwana	Yakbal, Amirbanu, Jones	Social	Sharda Film Company; DOP: Chimanlal Luhar
Fearless Phantom a.k.a. Andher Nagri a.k.a. Delhi No Dodh Chhel		Gangaram, Dwarki, Bapu	Costume	Shri Vijay Film; DOP: Naval Bhat
For Country's Sake	Harihar Diwana	Tara, Miss Mary	Costume	Sharada Film Company
Gaj Gouri		B. Yadav	Mythology	Maharashtra Film Company
Gentleman Loafer a.k.a. Bhadraveshi Goonda		Gulab, Madanrai Vakil, Jilloobai, Durmad	Social	Royal Art Studio
Golden Lotus a.k.a. Suvarna Kamal	K. P. Bhave	Master Vithal, Miss Mary, Heera, Shiraz Ali Hakim, Janibabu, Miss Rosy	Mythology	Sharda Film Company; DOP: Naval Bhatt
Indrajal a.k.a. Missing Bracelet	Bhagwati Mishra	Fatma Begum, Zubeida, Elizer, Jilloobai	Mythology	Royal Art Studio; DOP: Ardeshir Irani
Jaydev a.k.a. Joydeb		Patience Cooper	Devotional	Madan Theatres Ltd.
Jungle Ni Jadibuti a.k.a. Love Rewarded	Manilal Joshi	Tara, Bachu, Balabhai	Social	Sharda Film Company; DOP: Naval Bhatt

== K-M ==
Title	Director	Cast	Genre	Notes Cinematographer
Kacha Devyani a.k.a. Vidhyaharan	Shree Nath Patankar	K. B. Athavale, Thatte, Bhonsle	Mythological	Pioneer Film Co. DOP: Shree Nath Patankar
Kalabaaz Ashaq a.k.a. Wooing Tactics	V. K. Pattani	Dorothy, Batukbhai, Shanta, Allarakha Mir Nathalal Soni, Monghibai, Gatubhai Vaidya, Mavji Muflis	Social	Saurashtra Kinematograph Co; DOP: Champaklal Pattani
Kashmeera a.k.a. Enemy's Daughter	Manilal Joshi	Zubeida, Madanrai Vakil, W. M. Khan	Costume	Excelsior Film Company. DOP: D. D. Dabke
Kataryu Gap	Dinshaw Zhaveri	Madanrai Vakil	Social	Royal Art Studio. DOP: A. P. Karandikar
Keechak Vadh	G. V. Sane	Bhaurao Datar, Yamuna Gole, Bachu	Mythology	Hindustan Cinema Film Co., Nasik. DOP: Anna Salunke
Lakho Vanjaro	Homi Master	Jamuna, Gohar, Khalil	Legend	Kohinoor Film Company; DOP: K. G. Gokhale
Lion Of Mewar a.k.a. Diwan Bhamansha	M. D. Bhavnani	Elizer, Putli, Jilloobai, Madanrai Vakil	Historical	Imperial Film Company
Love Is Blind a.k.a. Raja Ne Gami Te Rani	Kanjibhai Rathod	Ermeline, Gulab	Social	Krishna Fil Company. DOP: Chimanlal Luhar
Madan Kala	Harihar Diwana	Master Vithal, Tara, Jani Babu, Miss Mary, Asha	Fantasy	Sharda Film Company. DOP: Naval Bhatt
Madhav Kam Kundala	Chandulal Shah	Raja Sandow, Putli, Miss Fiske, Blanche Verni	Legend	Lakshmi Pictures. DOP: D. D. Dabke
Manovijaya	Shree Nath Patankar	K. B. Athavale, Nargis, Takle		Pioneer Film Co. Shree Nath Patankar
Marriage Market a.k.a. Lagn Ke Lilam	Bachoo Babu	Moti, Usha Rani, Siddimiya	Social	Kohinoor Film Company; DOP: K. G. Gokhale
Mena Kumari	M. D. Bhavnani	Gohar, Raja Sandow, Vaidya, Ghanashyam	Costume	Kohinoor Film Company; DOP: Vishnu B. Joshi
Midnight Rider a.k.a. Pahadi Pindharo	Bhagwati Mishra	Madanrai Vakil, Putli, Miss Jean, Jilloobai, Rajhans	Costume	Imperial Film Company. DOP: A. P. Karandikar
Moon Cursed By Ganpati a.k.a. Chaturthicha Chandra	Dadasaheb Phalke	Bhaurao Datar,	Mythology	Hindustan Cinema Film Co., Nasik. DOP: Telang
Mohini Avatar a.k.a. Mohini Incarnation Of God a.k.a. Samudra Manthan	Raghupathy S. Prakasa		Mythology	Star Of The East Film Co., Madras
Mumtaz Mahal	Homi Master	Raja Sandow, Sulochana, Gohar, Siddimiya	Historical	Kohinoor Film Company; DOP: Narayan Devare

== N-S ==
Title	Director	Cast	Genre	Notes Cinematographer
Neera a.k.a. Beautiful Snake Of Aravali	Rama Chowdhury, R. G. Torney	Raja Sandow, Zubeida, Madanrai Vakil, Baba Vyas, Putli, Ghory, Dabir, K. B. Athavale	Fantasy	Lakshmi Pictures. DOP: Pandurang Naik
Pagal Premi a.k.a. Girl Mad	M. D. Bhavnani	Sulochana, Madanrai Vakil, M. D. Bhavnani	Social	Imperial Film Company. DOP: Adi Irani
Panna Ratna a.k.a. Jewel Of Mewar	Harshadrai Mehta	Fatma Begum, Nandram, Gangaram, Miss Fayma, Master Kamlakar	Legend	Krishna Film Company. DOP: Chaturbhai Patel
Prahlad a.k.a. Worshipper Prahlad a.k.a. Bhakta Prahlad	Baburao Painter	V. Shantaram, Kamladevi, Balasaheb Yadav, Gulabbai, Bal Kelkar, Padmabai, G. R. Mane	Mythology	Maharashtra Film Company. DOP: S. Fattelal
Profulla a.k.a. Prafulla	Jyotish Bannerji	Patience Cooper, Satyen Dey, Dadibhai Sarkari	Social	Madan Theatres Ltd
Punch Mahabhuta	Homi Master, Dr. Alvaro		Social	Pioneer Film Company
Pyari Mamta	Bhagwati Mishra	Madanrai Vakil, Putli, Jilloobai	Social	Imperial Film Company.
Radha Madhav	K. P. Bhave	Elizer, Madanrai Vakil, Jilloobai, Baburao Sansare, Dwarki, Asooji	Religious	Royal Art Studio. DOP: Rustom Irani
Raja Bhoj a.k.a. Man And His Destiny a.k.a. Trial Of Destiny	Dinshaw J. Jhaveri	Zubeida, Madanrai Vakil, Jilloobai, Saku	Legend Historical	Royal Art Studio. DOP: Rustom Irani
Ra Kawat a.k.a. Pranay Milan	M. D. Bhavnani	Raja Sandow, Ghanashyam, Sulochana (Ruby Myers), Gohar	Historical	Kohinoor Film Company, Saraswati Film Company. DOP: Vishnu B. Joshi
Ram Bharose a.k.a. Perchance	Harshadrai Mehta	Ermeline, Gulab, Nandram, Prabhudas, Durga, Kusum Kumari	Social	Krishna Film Company; DOP: Chimanlal Luhar
Ram Rajya Vijay a.k.a. The Triumph Of Lord Rama	Dadasaheb Phalke		Religious	Hindustan Cinema Film Co., Nasik
Ramrajya Vijay	G. V. Sane		Religious	Hindustan Cinema Film Co., Nasik
Ratan Manjari a.k.a. Ratna Manjari	Manilal Joshi	Master Vithal, Miss Mary		Sharda Film Company. DOP: Naval Bhat
Samrat Shiladitya a.k.a. Greatest Sacrifice	M. D. Bhavnani	Raja Sandow, Sulochana (Ruby Myers), Gohar, Moti	Historical	Kohinoor Film Company, Saraswati Film Company. DOP: D. D. Dabke
Sant Eknath a.k.a. Saint Of Paithan	Dadasaheb Phalke	Bhaurao Datar, Gotiram	Devotional	Hindustan Cinema Film Co., Nasik; DOP: Anna Salunke
Sarkari Praser	Baburao Painter			
Sati Jasma a.k.a. Jasma Odan	Homi Master	Gohar, Khalil, Jumuna, Noor Mohammed Charlie, R. N. Vaidya, Ghanshyam	Devotional	Kohinoor Film Company; DOP: Gajanan S. Deware
Sati Menadevi a.k.a. Costly Couplet	P. J. Jhaveri	Zubeida, Madanrai Vakil, Udvadia, Jilloobai	Legend	Royal Art Studio.
Sati Saroj a.k.a. Shiyal Ni Kasoti		Elizer, Madanrai Vakil, Jilloobai	Devotional Legend	Saraswati Film Company
Satyavijaya a.k.a. The Triumph Of Youth	Shree Nath Patankar	Keshav Narayan Kale, K. B. Athavale, Thatte	Social	Pioneer Film Company; DOP: Shree Nath Patankar
Saurashtra Veer	Nanubhai Desai	Parshwanath Yeshwant Altekar, Amir Banu	Costume	Sharda Film Company; DOP: Bhogilal Dave
Shah-E-Jungle a.k.a. King Of Forest	K. P. Bhave	Madanrai Vakil, Jilloobai, Bhagwati Mishra, M. Udwadia	Action Costume	Royal Art Studio. DOP: Rustom Irani
Sheesh Mahal	Bhagwati Mishra	Elizer, Madanrai Vakil, Jilloobai, Bhagwati Mishra	Costume	Royal Art Studio. DOP: Rustom Irani
Shirin Farhad a.k.a. At The Altar Of Love	Homi Master	Gohar, Khalil, Jumuna, Noor Mohammed Charlie, Daji, Heera	Legend Romance	Kohinoor Film Company
Slaves Of Custom	Bhagwati Mishra	Madanrai Vakil, Jilloobai, Bhagwati Mishra	Social	Royal Art Studio. DOP: Rustom Irani
Society Butterfly a.k.a. Khubsurat Bala	Kanjibhai Rathod	Fatma Begum, Ermeline, Nandram, Gulab, Haider Shah, Vishnu, Joshi	Costume	Krishna Film Company; DOP: Chaturbhai Patel
Sweet Adversity a.k.a. Panima Aag	Nagendra Majumdar	Madanrai Vakil, Jilloobai, Putli, Miss Jainu	Fantasy	Royal Art Studio. DOP: Rustom Irani

== T-Z ==
Title	Director	Cast	Genre	Notes Cinematographer
Tai Teleen a.k.a. Tayi Teleen	N. D. Sarpotdar	D. Bilimoria, Durga, Bapu Gokhale, Gangu	Historical	United Pictures Syndicate; DOP: Pandurang Talegiri
Telephone Girl	M. D. Bhavnani			
The Pretender a.k.a. Totayache Bund	N. D. Sarpotdar	Bandopant Sohoni, Wamanrao Kulkarni, Durgabai Koregaonkar, P. N. Varne, Dattoba Rajwade, D. N. Potdar	Historical	United Pictures Syndicate; DOP: Pandurang Talegiri
The Telephone Girl a.k.a. Telephone Ni Taruni	Homi Master	Sulochana (Ruby Myers), Raja Sandow, Gohar, Khalil, Jumuna	Social	Kohinoor Film Company; DOP: Narayan Deware
The Vamp a.k.a. Yauvan Chakra	Naval Gandhi	Miss Yakbal	Social	Sharda Film Company; DOP: Naval Bhat
The Victim a.k.a. Bhool No Bhog	Harshadrai Mehta	Ermeline, Gulab, Nandram, Prabhudas	Social	Krishna Film Company; DOP: Chimanlal Luhar
Typist Girl a.k.a. Why I Became A Christian	Chandulal Shah	Sulochana (Ruby Myers), Raja Sandow, Gohar	Social	Kohinoor Film Company; DOP: Narayan Deware
Vanthel Veshya a.k.a. Flirting Widow a.k.a. Vanthel Vidhwa	K. P. Bhave	Madanrai Vakil, Jilloobai	Action Costume	Royal Art Studio. DOP: Rustom Irani
Vasant Bala	Nanubhai B. Desai	Miss Jones, Master Vithal	Costume	Sharda Film Company. DOP: Naval Bhat
Veer Kesari a.k.a. Brave Kesari	Kanjibhai Rathod	Ermeline, Gulab, Haider Shah, Nandram, Vishnu, Joshi	Costume	Krishna Film Company; DOP: Chaturbhai Patel
Wandering Phantom a.k.a. Bhamto Bhoot	M. D. Bhavnani	Sulochana (Ruby Myers), Khalil, R. N. Vaidya, Behram Vasania	Fantasy	Kohinoor Film Company; DOP: Narayan Deware
Way Of The World a.k.a. Dagabaaz Duniya	Harihar Diwana	Miss Jones, Amir Banu, Yakbal	Social	Sharda Film Company. DOP: Cimanlal Luhar
