= Gul-e-Bakavali (1924 film) =

Indian silent film by Kanjibhai Rathod

- Directed by: Kanjibhai Rathod
- Written by: Mohanlal Dave
- Based on: The legend of Gul-e-Bakavali
- Produced by: Kohinoor Film Company
- Starring: Zubeida; Khalil; Fatma Begum; Sultana
- Release date: March 1924
- Running time: 7997 ft (approx. 140 minutes)
- Country: British India
- Language: Silent

Gul-E-Bakavali (lit. 'Flower of Bakavali') is a 1924 Indian silent fantasy film written in Gujarati by Mohanlal Dave, directed by Kanjibhai Rathod, and produced by the Kohinoor Film Company. The film stars Zubeida as Bakavali and Khalil as Taj-ul-Mulk. The film's story adapts a popular legend centered on a mystical flower believed to have healing powers, and a prince who seeks it to cure his father's blindness. Gul-E-Bakavali is described by film scholars as the 'first all-India super hit' and among the most successful silent films.

The film was structured into 97 scenes and included elaborate fantasy elements distinct from the mythological themes common in Rathod and Dave's earlier works like Bhakta Vidur. According to some sources, Gul-E-Bakavali ran in theatres for more than fourteen weeks and achieved unprecedented success by breaking all the records that came before it. Though the original 1924 version of the film was lost, it survives in popular memory through its several regional remakes.

== Cast ==
The cast has been listed below:

- Zubeida as Bakavali
- Khalil as Taj-ul-Mulk
- Fatma Begum
- Sultana as Memudu
- Noor Mohamed
- Savita
- Jamna as Lakhi
- Usha Rani

== Origin and adaptations ==
The story of Gul-E-Bakavali is based on a legend with multiple origins. Rauf Parekh considers the tale to be of Indo-Iranian origin. According to Parthasarathy and Aleem, "Some scholars suggest an origin in older oral folk traditions in either Bengal or Assam, but the general consensus places it in Rewa or the wider Bagelkhand region of present-day Madhya Pradesh." The legend's popularity largely attributed to Nihal Chand Lahori's translation of Izzat Ali Bengali's Persian narrative, influenced by John Gilchrist at Fort William College in Calcutta in the early 19th century. In 1838–39, Daya Shankar Kaul Naseem Lakhnavi, a Kashmiri Pandit, versified the tale in Urdu as a masnavi titled Gulzar-i-Naseem, first published in 1844.

Following the 1924 film directed by Kanjibhai Rathod, Gul-e-Bakavali was adapted into several Indian and Pakistani films. Some of them are the 1935 Tamil version starring V.A. Chellappa and T.P. Rajalakshmi, the 1938 Telugu version directed by Kallakoori Sathasiva Rao featuring B. Jayamma, the 1955 Tamil version starring M.G. Ramachandran, and the 1962 Telugu film Gulebakavali Katha starring N.T. Rama Rao. Hindi versions were released in 1932, 1947, 1956, and 1963.

== Legacy ==
A shooting script of Gul-e-Bakavali (1924) was discovered in the personal archive of film historian Virchand Dharamsey. The script, preserved in a bound notebook, contains detailed production information such as scene descriptions, shot lengths, intertitles, and others. In 2012, it was translated and published in the peer-reviewed journal BioScope: South Asian Screen Studies, and it is considered the only known surviving script of its kind from India's silent film era. Film scholar Debashree Mukherjee notes, citing Kaushik Bhaumik, that the existence of such a document demonstrates that structured and technically detailed screenwriting practices were present at least in some films of Indian silent cinema, countering earlier views that such films lacked formal scripting. However, scholar Rakesh Sengupta suggests that such isolated archival findings, while valuable, cannot be treated as proof of a sequential historiography of screenwriting. Rashmi Sawhney regards the film as the first 'secular' film of Bombay cinema.

== See also ==
Some later adaptations:

- Gul-E-Bakawali (1939 film), 1939 Indian Punjabi-language film
- Gulebakavali (1955 film), 1955 Indian Tamil-language film
- Gulebakavali Katha, 1962 Indian Telugu-language film
