= Midnight Rider (disambiguation) =

"Midnight Rider" is a 1970 song by the Allman Brothers Band.

Midnight Rider(s) may also refer to:

- Midnight Rider (film), an uncompleted biographical film about Gregg Allman
- Midnight Rider, a 1977 album by Tommy James
- "The Midnight Rider", a former ring name of wrestler Dusty Rhodes
- Midnight Riders (MLS supporters association), the independent supporters association for the New England Revolution of Major League Soccer
- Midnight Riders, a fictional rock band from the video game Left 4 Dead 2
- "Midnight Rider", a song by the Godfathers from Alpha Beta Gamma Delta, 2022
- "Midnight Rider", the English version of Alan Tam's song "Ng Ye Ke Si", featured in the Jackie Chan film Armour of God (1986)
- Pahadi Pindhari or The Midnight Rider, a 1926 Indian silent action film starring Jillo, Baburao and B. S. Rajhans

== See also ==
- Midnight Ridazz, late-night group bicycle ride
- Midnight Ride (disambiguation)
