= Gul-E-Bakawali (1939 film) =

- Produced by: D. M. Pancholi
- Starring: Suraiya; Noor Jehan; Salim Raza; Hem Lata; Jabeen
- Music by: Ghulam Haider
- Release date: 1939 (British India)
- Country: India
- Language: Punjabi

Gul-E-Bakawali (transl. Flower of Bakawali) is a 1939 Indian Punjabi-language film by D. M. Pancholi, starring Salim Raza, Noor Jehan, Suraiya, Hem Lata and Jabeen. Based on the Indian folktale The Rose of Bakawali about the hedychium flower, said to be from a Persian legend in the Arabian Nights, it tells the story of fairy Bakawali and a prince who wants her magical flower to cure his blind father.

== Music ==
The film's music was composed by Ghulam Haider. The playback singers were K.L. Saigal and Shamshad Begum.

== See also ==
- Gul-e-Bakavali (1924 film), 1924 Indian silent film
- Gulebakavali (1955 film), 1955 Indian Tamil-language film
- Gulebakavali Katha, 1962 Indian Telugu-language
