= Anjaam (1940 film) =

1940 film

- Directed by: Kanjibhai Rathod
- Release date: 1940
- Country: British Raj
- Language: Hindi

Anjaam is a 1940 Bollywood film directed by Kanjibhai Rathod. It stars Anil Kumar, Yashwant Dave, Meher Sultana and Samson.
