= Chaplin Cinema (Kolkata) =

Historic movie theatre in Kolkata, India

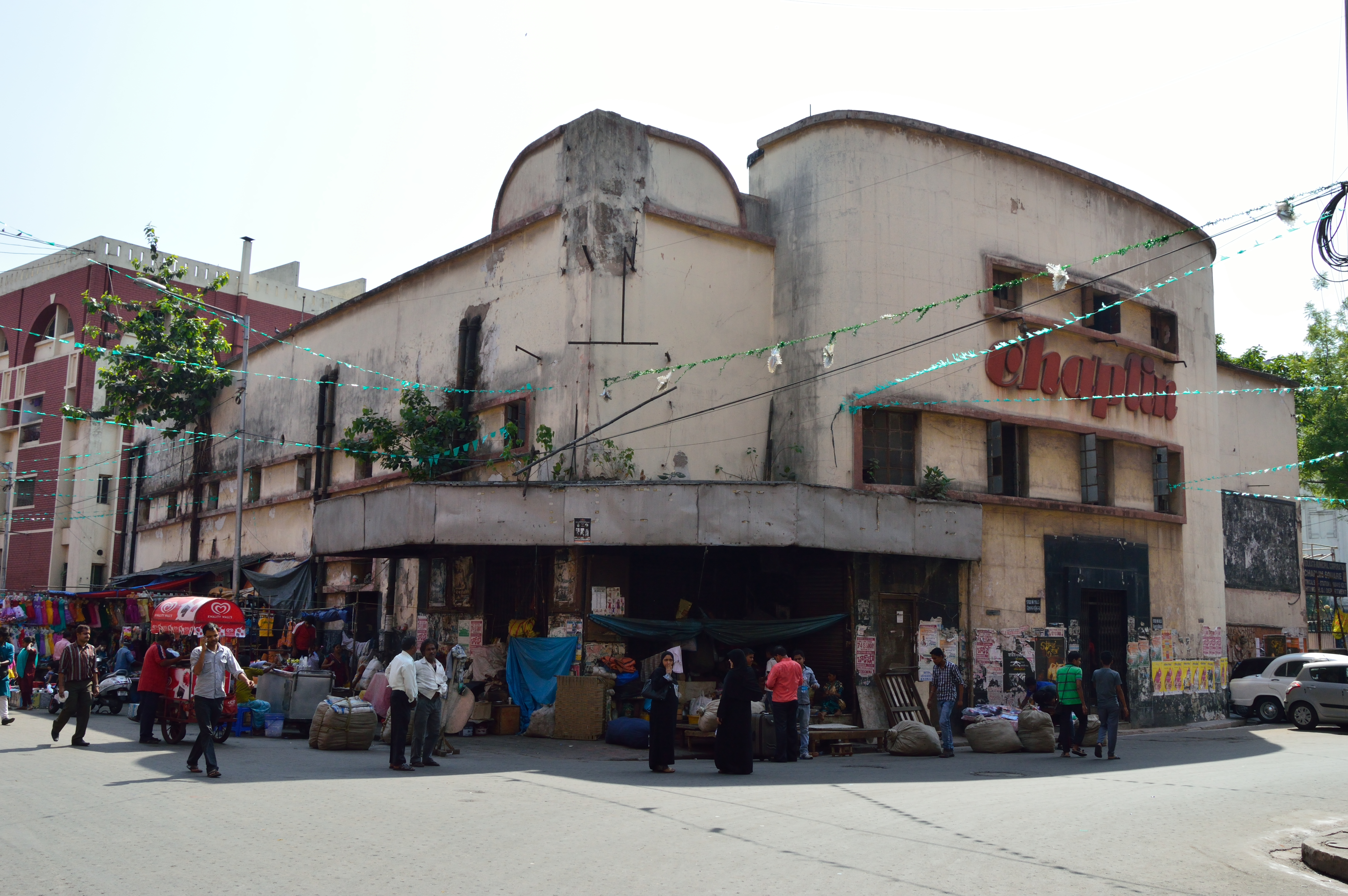

- Location within West Bengal

General information
- Type: Cinema hall, Heritage building
- Location: Chowringhee Place, Kolkata, India
- Coordinates: 22.5615°N 88.3508°E
- Inaugurated: 1907

Chaplin Cinema was the oldest single screen movie theatre in Kolkata, West Bengal, India. It was located in 5/1 Chowringhee Place. In 1907 Jamshedji Framji Madan opened this cinema in India.

== History ==
In 1907 Jamshedji Framji Madan established the Elphinstone Picture Palace. In this theatre father of Uttam Kumar used to run the projector. It was later renamed to Minerva cinema (not to be confused with Minerva Theatre). The condition of the movie theatre deteriorated over decades before the Calcutta Municipal Corporation overhauled it, and christened it Chaplin in 1980s. The theatre was demolished by the municipal corporation in 2013 after remaining non-functional for several years.

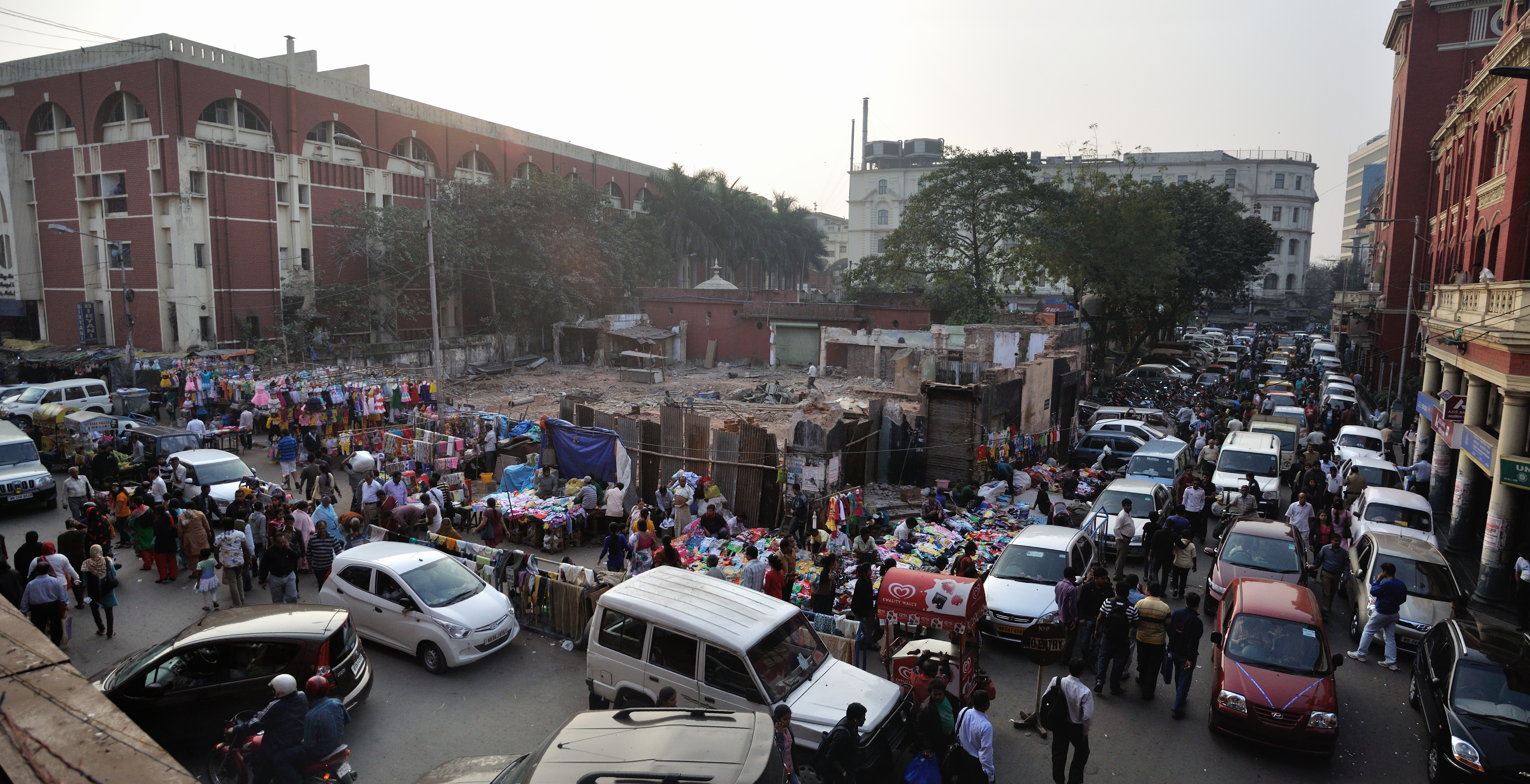
This site occupied by the Chaplin Cinema, it has been demolished by the Kolkata Municipal Corporation. December 2013

== See also ==
- Cinemas in Kolkata
- Globe Cinema (Kolkata)
