= Mojili Mumbai =

- Directed by: Manilal Joshi
- Starring: Yakbal; P. K. Raja Sandow; Noor Mohammed
- Cinematography: D. D. Dabke
- Edited by: R. G. Torne
- Production company: Kohinoor Film Company
- Release date: 1925
- Country: India
- Language: Silent film

Mojili Mumbai (English: The Slaves of Luxury) was 1925 silent social film directed by Manilal Joshi from India.

== Plot ==
Wealthy businessman Nanavati was charmed by Roshanara, a dancer. Chhotalal who worked as a pimp/agent of Roshanara makes a plan to rob Nanavati who has bought a gold necklace to gift her daughter on her birthday. Chhotalal make Nanavati to visit Roshnara. Roshnara seduces Nanavati and gets the necklace. When Nananvati realises that he is robbed, he confronts Chhotalal who had replaced it with fake necklace by then.

== Cast ==
The cast is as follows:

- Yakbal as Roshanara
- P. K. Raja Sandow as Mr. Nanavati
- Jamna
- Ganibabu
- Moti
- Noor Mohammed as Chhotalal
- Baby Saraswati

== Production ==
The film depicted the moral decline in urban middle class and rich people of colonial Mumbai which was one of the first film to depict contemporary culture. It provided the moral commentary on westernized rich and dark side of "modern civilization". The character of Roshanara was reportedly based on a real-life cabaret dancer Roshnara. This silent black-and-white film was 8220 feet long.

== Reception ==
The film was one of the Joshi's best known films.

It sparked debate in Be Ghadi Mouj, a journal, about "morality and cinematic realism" between its editor Shayda and Joshi. Joshi defended that he only wanted to make social comment on common incidents in culture of Mumbai by his film. Several other films such as Baap Kamal (1925) depicted a character of dancer named Roshanara.
