= Midnight Ride =

Midnight Ride may refer to:

- Midnight Ride (film), a 1990 American action/thriller
- Midnight Ride (album), an album by Paul Revere & the Raiders
- "Midnight Ride" (song), a 2024 song by Orville Peck, Kylie Minogue and Diplo
- "The Midnight Ride" (Sleepy Hollow), a 2013 television episode
- Paul Revere's midnight ride in 1775 at the beginning of the Revolutionary war
- "Midnight Ride", a song from the fictional band The Midnight Riders in Left 4 Dead 2.

== See also ==
- Midnight Rider (disambiguation)
