= Katorabhar Khoon =

1920 film

- Katorabhar Khoon
- Directed by: S. N. Patankar
- Starring: Trymbakarao Pradhan, Tara Koregaonkar.
- Release date: 1920
- Country: India
- Language: Hindi

Katorabhar Khoon (also known as Stinger Stung) is a 1920 Hindi film produced by Dwarkadas Sampat. It was based on a story written by Mohanlal G. Dave, and directed by Shree Nath Patankar.
