= List of cinemas in Kolkata =

Screens responsible for film distribution

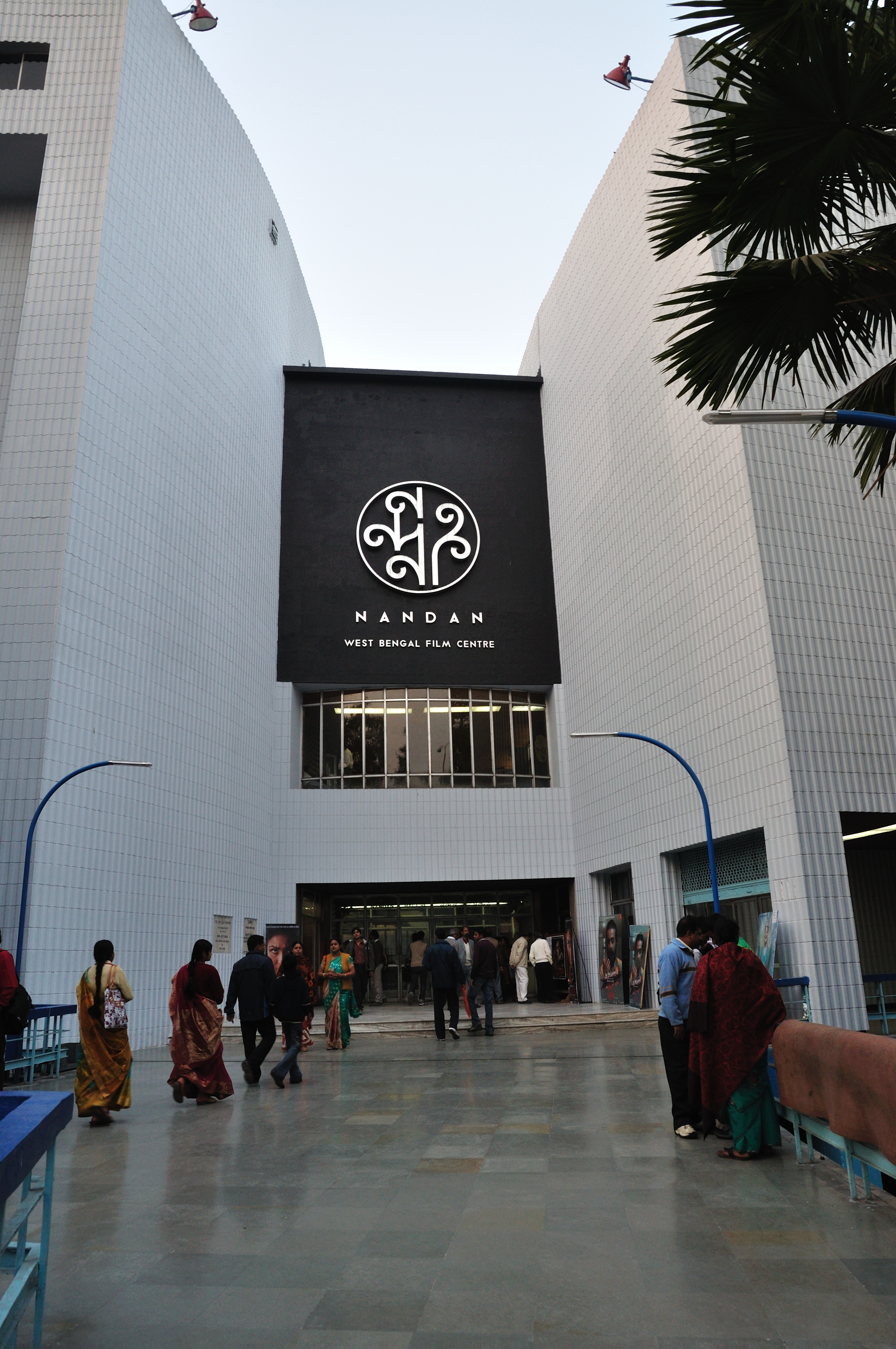
"Nandan", West Bengal film centre in capital Kolkata

Cinema has been one of the most popular forms of entertainment in the city of Kolkata, India and movie theatres since the 20th century. And movie theatres are major entertainment venues in the city.

== Notable cinemas ==
There are many single screen and multiplex halls in the city.

=== Single screen ===
Bijoli Cinema

Bijoli Cinema is located in 38, Shyama Prasad Mukherjee Rd, Jatin Das Park, Patuapara, Bhowanipore, Kolkata.

Chaplin Cinema

Chaplin Cinema is one of the oldest cinema halls in Kolkata, established in 1907. The cinema is located in Hogg Street.

Chhabighar Cinema

Chhabighar Cinema is located in 10-A, Mahatma Gandhi Rd, Sealdah, Baithakkhana, Kolkata.

Globe

Globe Cinema is a single screen cinema hall and heritage building located in Lindsay Street (opposite New Market entrance)

Jyoti

Jyoti Cinema is located in Lenin Sarani. In the 1970s this movie theatre created a sensation by screening 70mm films. In 2008 the theatre was closed.

Lighthouse

Lighthouse Cinema was a single screen cinema hall and heritage building located in Humayun Place in New Market, next to New Empire

Metro

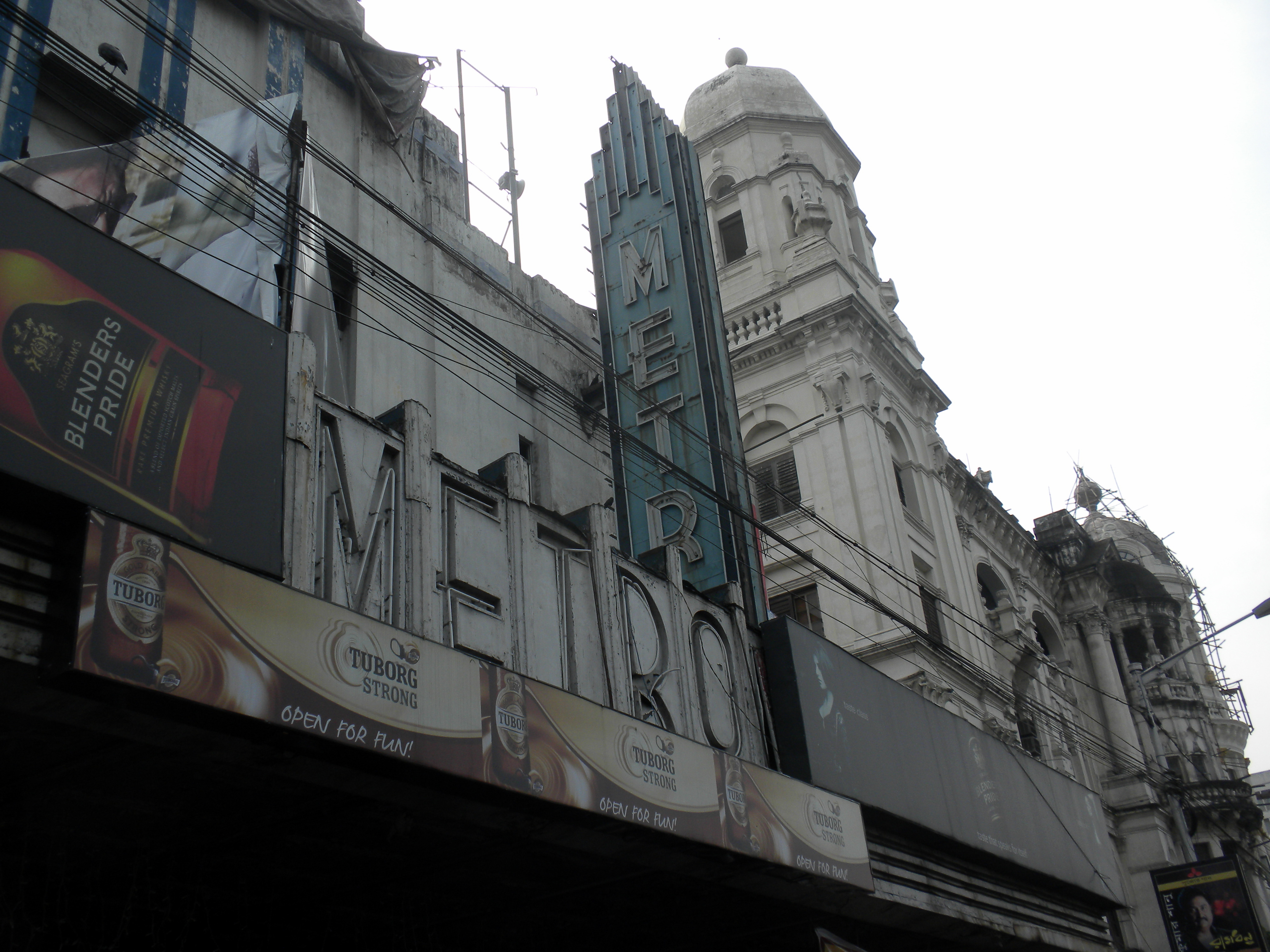
Metro Cinema in Dharmatala

Metro Cinemas is a uniplex cinema hall and a heritage building located in Jawahar Lal Nehru Road (Esplanade),

New Empire

New Empire Cinema is a single screen cinema hall located in Humayun Place in New Market, (opposite Shreeram Arcade).

Paradise

Paradise Cinema is a single screen cinema hall located in Bentinck Street (Esplanade)

Priya

Priya Cinema is a uniplex cinema hall situated in Rashbehari Avenue, near Deshapriya Park

Roxy

Roxy is located in Esplanade, Kolkata. Once an Opera House it was converted into a movie theatre in the early 1940s. Netaji Subhas Chandra Bose came to this theatre to watch Ashok Kumar-starrer Kismat.

Star Theatre

Star Theatre is a cinema and theatre hall initially located in Beadon Street, later moved to Bidhan Sarani. This theatre was built in 1883.

Mitra

Mitra was a cinema hall, located in Bidhan Sarani. Mitra began its journey as Chitra in 1931 and its inauguration was graced by Subhas Chandra Bose.

Elite

Elite was a cinema hall, located in S.N. Banerjee Road.

In the last decade of the 20th century, a kilometre-long stretch of north Calcutta had as many as 9 single screen cinema halls; Uttara, Sree, Rupbani, Radha, Purnasree, Mitra, Minar, Darpana and Talkie Show House. Rupbani was inaugurated and christened by Rabindranath Tagore himself.

=== Multiplex ===
Nandan

Nandan is a Government sponsored cinema located in A.J.C. Bose Road, (near Rabindra Sadan. The theatre was inaugurated by Satyajit Ray in 1985. There are four screens Nandan–I, Nandan–II, Nandan–III and Nandan–IV here. In Nandan–I and Nandan–II films are regularly screened.

== See also ==
- Cinema in Delhi
- Cinema in Kerala
