= Maroli =

- Town
- Location in Gujarat, India Maroli (India)
- Coordinates: 21.024°N 72.889°E
- Country: India
- State: Gujarat
- District: Navsari

Government
  - Type: Municipal corporation

Area
  - Total: 5 km^{2} (1.9 sq mi)

Population (2001)
  - Total: 12,746
  - Density: 2,500/km^{2} (6,600/sq mi)

Languages
  - Official: Gujarati, Hindi
- Time zone: UTC+5:30 (IST)
- Vehicle registration: GJ21
- Website: gujaratindia.com

Maroli is a town in the state of Gujarat, India. The town is also one of the satellite towns of Surat Metropolitan Region. It is located 25 kilometers from Surat on Surat-Navsari Highway.

== Demographics ==
As of 2001 India census, Maroli had a population of 30,746. Males constitute 57% of the population and females 43%. Maroli has an average literacy rate of 71%, higher than the national average of 59.5% with male literacy of 78% and female literacy of 62%. 14% of the population is under 6 years of age.

== History ==
Indian Freedom fighter Mithuben Petit set up an ashram in Maroli, which was called Kasturba Vanat Shala which taught underprivileged children from families of Adivasis, Harijans and fisher folk spinning. It also taught carding, weaving, dairy farming, leather work, and a Diploma Course in Sewing, to women. Petit also opened a hospital of the same name for the treatment of mentally ill patients.
