= Manilal Joshi =

Indian silent film director (1893–1927)

- Born: 1893
- Died: 7 September 1927 (aged 33–34)
- Occupation: Film director
- Known for: Silent films

Manilal Joshi (1893 – 7 September 1927) was a film director of silent films from Indian cinema.

== Biography ==
Joshi was a school teacher in Bombay before joining cinema. He was trained under cinematographer Vishnu B. Joshi at Kohinoor Studio (1920). He started his career as a director with his debut film Veer Abhimanyu (1922). The film was produced by Ardeshir Irani and Bhogilal Dave who had started their banner, Star Film Company Ltd. in 1922. The film was known as Virat Swaroop and was a "big-budget mythological". It was also a debut for actress Sultana who played the role of Uttara, with Vakil playing Abhimanyu. The film apparently included flashbacks in Indian cinema for the first time. He started his independent production company Swastika Film in 1923 which failed. His next Prithvi Vallabh (1924) under his banner Ashoka Pictures was a hit. His Mojili Mumbai (1925) depicted the moral decline in urban Westernised middle-class people of Mumbai which was one of the first film to depict contemporary culture. He later worked for Kohinoor Film Company and produced films under Laxmi Films established in 1925 as an associated company. He worked at Sharda Studio and Excelsior Film for short periods.

== Legacy ==
Joshi was the first director who recognised the rights of director as an author of the film. He also introduced rolling of credits to cast and crew on screen. His films had fine cinematography.

== Filmography ==
Silent films

- 1922: Veer Abhimanyu, Raja Parikshit, Ratnavali
- 1923: Sati No Sraap, Kirat Arjun
- 1924: Prithvi Vallabh
- 1925: Indrasabha, Raj Yogi, Desh Na Dushman, Veer Kunal, Mojili Mumbai, Devadasi, Suvarna, Khandani Khavis, Kala Chor, Sati Simantini
- 1926: Jungle Ni Jadibuti, Ajabkumari, Ratan Manjari, Dulari, Kashmeera
- 1927: Nanand Bhojai, Parsa Eblis, Shrimati Nalini, Laila Majnu, Lohika Lilam, Prem Ni Pratima
