= Bhakta Vidur =

1921 film directed by Kanjibhai Rathod

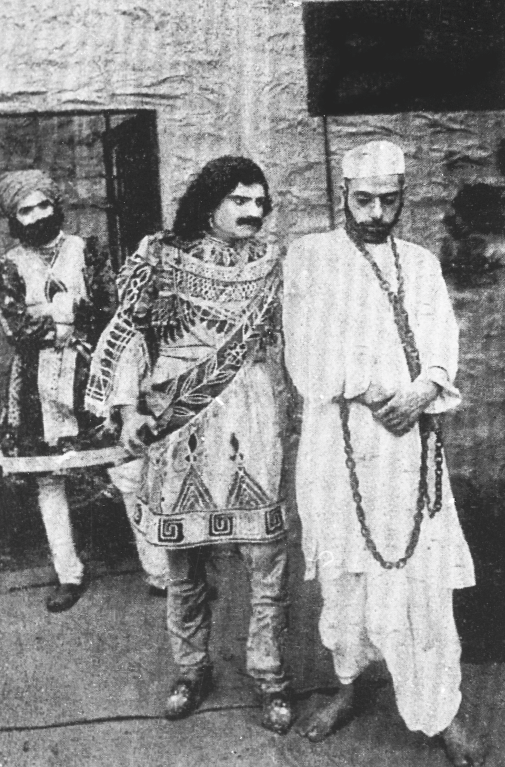
- Directed by: Kanjibhai Rathod
- Starring: See below
- Production company: Kohinoor Film Company
- Release date: 1921
- Country: India
- Language: Silent

Bhakta Vidur (Hindi: भक्त विदुर, "Devotion of Vidura") is a 1921 silent Indian film directed by Kanjibhai Rathod and made under Kohinoor Film Company banner. In this film the Hindu mythological character Vidura was moulded on the personality of Mohandas Karamchand Gandhi. This was the first Indian film to face a ban.

== Plot ==
The story of the film is based on Hindu epic Mahabharata and depicts a series of conflicts between Pandavas and Kauravas. Vidura, who was half-brother to the kings Dhritarashtra (father of Kauravas) and Pandu (father of Pandavas) of Hastinapura, is the main character of the film and the events of the film are portrayed from his perspective. Throughout the film, Vidura shows his compassion and sympathy towards Pandavas multiple times. He gives condolences to Pandavas and assures them that truth always prevails, Kauravas will be punished soon for their sins. The series of conflicts between Pandavas and Kauravas finally leads to the terrible Kurukshetra War.

== Cast ==
- Dwarkadas Sampat as Vidura
- Maneklal Patel as Krishna
- Homi Master as Duryodhana
- Prabhashankar
- Gangaram

== Restrictions ==
Bhakta Vidur became the first film to be banned in India. The film came just after Rowlatt Act was passed in India. The character of Vidura was reportedly portrayed imitating Mahatma Gandhi, his personality. There were scenes in the film where Vidura appeared like Gandhi wearing Gandhi cap, Khaddar etc. Many more contemporary political events of India were shown as reference in the film. As a result, the film was restricted, as the censor board concluded– "We know what you are doing, it is not Vidur, it is Gandhiji, we won't allow it." It was also written in the censor's report– "It is likely to excite dissatisfaction against government and incite people to non co-operation". The film was banned in Madras, Karachi and some other provinces.

== See also ==
- Raja Harishchandra
- List of films banned in India
