= Gulebakavali (1955 film) =

1955 film by T. R. Ramanna

- Theatrical release poster
- Directed by: T. R. Ramanna
- Screenplay by: Thanjai N. Ramaiah Dass
- Produced by: T. R. Ramanna
- Starring: M. G. Ramachandran; T. R. Rajakumari; Rajasulochana; G. Varalakshmi
- Cinematography: T. K. Rajabahathar
- Edited by: M. S. Mani; A. Thangaraj
- Music by: Viswanathan–Ramamoorthy
- Production company: R. R. Pictures
- Distributed by: K. S. Pictures
- Release date: 29 July 1955
- Running time: 165 minutes
- Country: India
- Language: Tamil

Gulebakavali (/ɡuleɪbəkɑːvəli/ transl. The Flower of Bakavali) is a 1955 Indian Tamil-language action adventure film produced and directed by T. R. Ramanna, and written by Thanjai N. Ramaiah Dass. The film stars M. G. Ramachandran, T. R. Rajakumari, Rajasulochana and G. Varalakshmi. Based on the story of the same name from the Arabic folklore collection, One Thousand and One Nights, it tells the story of a young prince who sets out to the kingdom of Bakavali to find a mysterious flower which is believed to have the power to restore his father's eyesight. The film was released on 29 July 1955 and became a commercial success.

== Plot ==
A king has two wives. He banishes his first wife as an astrologer told him that he would lose his vision because of her son Dasan. The mother and son live in the woods and when he meets his father without knowing his identity, the king loses his sight. When the son gets to know about the sad tale from his mother, he sets out to bring a rare flower from the kingdom of Bakavali, which would restore the king's sight.

To achieve it, Dasan undergoes many adventures — enters into a debate with the queen Bakavali and wins the battle of wits, challenges a woman Lakbesha held captive by a crook Sukur in a fake dice contest, and rescues a slave dancer Mehmoodha of a tribal chief. Dasan wins them all and succeeds in getting the flower along with the three women who turn out to be princesses and siblings. Meanwhile, his stepbrothers try to steal the flower, but are exposed.

== Cast ==
- M. G. Ramachandran as Prince Dasan
- T. R. Rajakumari as Princess Lakbesha
- Rajasulochana as Princess Mehmoodha
- G. Varalakshmi as Queen Bakavali
- K. A. Thangavelu as Sukur
- Chandrababu as Gulam
- E. R. Sahadevan
- A. Karunanidhi as Prince
- E. V. Saroja as Gulzar
- S. D. Subbulakshmi as Dasan's mother

== Production ==
Gulebakavali is the second Tamil film to be based on the story of the same name from the Arabic folklore collection One Thousand and One Nights, following a 1935 film. The film also involved a fight sequence between lead actor M. G. Ramachandran and a lion. Thanjai N. Ramaiah Dass, who wrote the screenplay, also wrote the songs' lyrics.

== Soundtrack ==
The soundtrack was composed by the duo Viswanathan–Ramamoorthy and all lyrics were written by Thanjai N. Ramaiah Dass. The song "Mayakkum Maalai" is one of the earliest film songs to be set in the Carnatic raga named Bageshri. It was originally composed by K. V. Mahadevan for Ramanna's previous film Koondukkili (1954). As that film was getting delayed and the song was yet to be filmed, Ramanna instead used it in Gulebakavali. Viswanathan–Ramamoorthy were credited as the composers instead of Mahadevan.

Track listing
No.	Title	Singers	Length
1.	"Mayakkum Maalai"	Jikki, A. M. Rajah	4:27
2.	"Nayagamae Nabi"	S. C. Krishnan, Nagore E. M. Hanifa	2:51
3.	"Acchu Nimirndha Vandi"	J. P. Chandrababu, A. G. Rathnamala	3:12
4.	"Villendhum Veerarellam"	Thiruchi Loganathan, P. Leela, G. K. Venkatesh	6:33
5.	"Maaya Valayil"	T. M. Soundararajan	1:13
6.	"Vitthara Kalliyellam"	T. M. Soundararajan	1:29
7.	"Kaiyai Thottathum"	T. M. Soundararajan, P. Leela	2:37
8.	"Na Sokka Potta Navabu"	Jikki	3:36
9.	"Aasaiyum Nesamum"	K. Jamuna Rani	3:37
10.	"Bhagavali Naattilae"	T. M. Soundararajan	3:47
11.	"Kannalae Pesum"	Jikki	3:54
12.	"Arivuppoti" (dialogues)	M. G. Ramachandran	3:26
Total length:			40:42

== Release ==
Gulebakavali was released on 29 July 1955, and was distributed by K. S. Pictures in Madras. The film became a commercial success.

== Legacy ==
The 2018 film Gulaebaghavali was named after this film, but with a different spelling. To connect these two films, director Kalyaan devised a "special flashback sequence".
