= Khalil (actor) =

Indian silent and talkie film actor (1903–1941)

- Khalil in Niti Vijay (1932)
- Born: Khalil Ahmed; 1903
- Died: 28 October 1941 (aged 37–38); Calcutta
- Occupation: Actor
- Years active: 1920–1941

Khalil (1903–1941) was an Indian cinema actor of silent and talkie films. He achieved stardom with silent films like Gul-E-Bakavali (1924), Kulin Kanta (1925), and Lanka Ni Laadi (1925) which was a major success commercially. His other successes included Cinema Queen (1925) with Sulochana, Draupadi (1931), and Daily Mail (1930). Khalil is referred to as the "macho hero".

Khalil worked from 1920 to 1941, making a transition to Talkies in 1931 with Draupadi directed by B. P. Mishra, and Daulat Ka Nasha directed by Pesi Karani. Both films were produced by Kohinoor and Imperial Films. He shifted to Calcutta from Bombay in 1934, and immediately "made his mark" with the East India Film Company production Quismat Ki Kasauti (1934), directed by Pesi Karani. He also wrote lyrics for films like Dard-e-Dil (1934).

== Career ==
=== Silent films ===
Khalil's first film was Krishna Sudama (1920), a silent film co-produced by Kohinoor Film Company and Imperial Film Company. He joined the Kohinoor Film Company in 1925, along with other known actors of that time like Raja Sandow, Zubeida and Tara. Some of his notable silent films were Sati Parvati (1920), Mahasati Ansuya (1921), Rukmani Haran (1921), Malti Madhav (1922), Surya Kumari (1922) and Manorama (1924).

In 1924, he acted as a "lecherous Maharaja" in Kulin Kanta. The film was based on a true incident cited as the Bawla murder case, and depicted the story of the Maharaja Tukoji Rao Holkar III of Indore and a dancing girl who wanted to escape from the harem.

In 1925, Khalil acted as a shepherd in love with a princess he saves, in Kohinoor Film Company's fantasy production called Lanka Ni Laadi, also known as Fairy Of Ceylon. The film was directed by Homi Master with story by Mohanlal G. Dave. It co-starred Gohar and Jamna. The film became Gohar's first "major" hit and "grossed more than any other film in 1925".

=== Talkies ===
Khalil joined Indian Talkies 1931, and worked in the two films produced by them, Draupadi and Daulat Ka Nasha. Draupadi, also called The Daughter Of King Drupad, was the story of Draupadi from the epic Mahabharata. It was produced by the Imperial Film Company and directed by Bhagwati Prasad Mishra. Khalil played Lord Krishna with actress Ermiline playing Draupadi. Daulat Ka Nasha was directed by Pesi Karani.

He continued to make his mark with films like Bharat Mata (1932), directed by Pesi Karani, Niti Vijay (1932), directed by Moti Gidwani, Do Rangi Duniya, directed by Pesi Karani and Saubhagya Sundari, directed by Homi Master. All films were produced by Imperial Film Company.

In 1934, Khalil acted in Mazdoor, also known as The Mill, which was directed by Mohan Bhavnani for Ajanta Cinetone. Written by Munshi Premchand, it was one of the first talkies to be banned by British censors in India.

Khalil shifted from Bombay to Calcutta, where he achieved success working again with Karani in East India Films' Kismet Ki Kasauti (1934). With Madan Theatres Ltd. he worked in Miss Manorama (1935) and Bulbul-e-Iran (1936), directed by Faredoon Irani, and in Miss Parivartan, directed by Ezra Mir.

In 1937, Khalil acted in Whose Darling?, also called Kiski Pyari?. He played the second lead to Jal Merchant and Zubeida. The film was written and directed by Akhtar Nawaz. The advertisement in filmindia called it a "Heart-throbbing Rajput story of love, romance and chivalry". The film was produced by Sunrise Film Co. from The Tollywood Studios.

== Personal life and death ==
A Muslim by birth, he performed varied roles in films. His initial acting phase had him playing Hindu Gods in mythology films. He portrayed Krishna and Rama several times. Disenchanted by the communalism arising in the film industry, he made a speech against it at the Indian Motion Pictures Congress on 4 May 1939. A section was quoted in his obituary in the cine-mag Filmindia in 1941:

"I have played all the Gods from Hindu mythology from Lord Krishna to Prabhu Ramchandra. I have worked all my life under Hindu employers. And now when I hear of communalism in our film industry my heart bleeds. I have been liked and loved by Hindus and Muslims alike. We are all devotees of art and art is above any community".

Khalil died on 28 October 1941, in Calcutta, after a short illness. He was thirty-seven years old and left behind "a widow" and "five children".

== Filmography ==
Lists:

=== Silent films ===
Year	Film
1920	Krishna Sudama
1921	Sati Parvati
1921	Mahasati Ansuya
1921	Rukmini Haran
1922	Malti Madhav
1922	Suryakumari
1924	Gul Bakavali
1924	Manorama
1924	Minal Devi
1925	Kulin Kanta
1925	Child Widow
1925	Dream Of Life
1925	Lanka Ni Laadi
1925	Veer Bala
1926	Lakho Vanjaro
1926	Sati Jasama
1926	Shirin Farhad
1926	Thief Of Delhi
1926	Wandering Phantom
1927	Return Of Kala Naag
1927	The Mission Girl
1927	Why Sons Go Astray
1928	Bhai Ki Kasai
1928	Gul Sanobar
1928	Rajnibala
1928	Veerangana
1929	The Lovers
1930	A Woman's Vengeance
1930	Daily Mail
1931	Cavalier Of Love

=== Talkies ===
A partial list:

Year	Film	Director	Studio/Producer
1931	Draupadi	B. P. Mishra	Imperial Film Company
1931	Daulat Ka Nasha	Pesi Karani	Imperial Film Company
1932	Bharati Mata	Pesi Karani	Imperial Film Company
1932	Niti Vijay	Moti Gidwani	Imperial Film Company
1933	Dorangi Duniya	Pesi Karani	Imperial Film Company
1933	Saubhagya Sundari	Homi Master	Imperial Film Company
1934	Kismet Ki Kasauti	Pesi Karani	East India Film Company
1934	Mazdoor a.k.a. Mill	Mohan Bhavnani	Ajanta Cinetone
1935	Gaibi Gola	Vithaldas Panchotia	Tollywood Studio (Madan Theatres)
1935	Miss Manorama	Faredoon Irani	Tollywood Studio (Madan Theatres)
1936	Parivartan	Ezra Mir	Madan Theatres
1936	Shaitan Ka Pash	Ezra Mir	Madan Theatres
1937	Aflatoon	Pesi Karani	Tollywood Studio (Madan Theatres)
1937	Kiski Pyari a.k.a. Whose Love	Akhtar Nawaz	Sunrise Pictures
1938	Karma Veer	Vithaldas Panchotia	Sitaram Cine
1940	Hamara Desh	A. M. Khan	Mohan Pictures
1941	Abla Ki Shanti	Munshi Dil	Radha Films
1941	Merchant Of Venice	J. J. Madan	Radha Films
