= S. N. Patankar =

Sadashiv Narayan Patankar
- Born: Sadashiv Narayan Patankar early 1880s
- Died: 1941
- Occupation(s): Director, cinematographer, producer
- Years active: 1912–1926

Sadashiv Narayan Patankar (?-1941) was an Indian producer, director, and cameraman. Referred to as "one of the early pioneers of Indian Cinema", his influence is stated to be equal to that of Dadasaheb Phalke. He was one of a wide range of people who filmed the historic Delhi Durbar in 1911 held for King George V, Emperor of India. The Durbar was also filmed by Madan and Hiralal Sen, another professional photographer from Bombay.

Patankar initially teamed up with V. P. Divekar and A. P. Karandikar, with the renowned freedom fighter and Nationalist leader, Lokmanya Tilak, helping them in getting finance from Bhagwandas Chaturbhuj and Dharamdas Narayandas, two well-established financiers. Their debut production in 1912, Savitri, directed by Patankar was unsuccessful. The three formed a production company called Patankar Union in 1913. They produced The Death Of Narayanrao Peshwa also called The Murder Of Narayanrao Peshwa in 1915, which has been cited as the first historical film of Indian cinema, as well as the mythological Ram Vanvas (The Exile Of Rama) (1918).

Patankar went on to form Patankar Friends and Company with Dwarkadas Sampat who had joined them in 1917, producing and directing Kach-Devyani (1920). He also worked as an actor in films like Mahashweta Kadambari (1922), Videhi Janak (1923), and Vaman Avatar (1923), which were directed by him. In a career-span of fifteen years covering 1912-1926, he made over forty films.

According to Rajadhyaksha and Willemen, Patankar's "historicals and mythologicals were among the most professionally made films before the studio era (pre-1925)".

== Career ==
Born in the early 1880s, he worked as "a decorator in Chitre's Coronation Cinema in Bombay". His interest in still photography led him to purchase a film camera from H. S. Bhatavdekar, a professional photographer in Bombay. One of his early works along with V.P. Divekar and A.P. Karandikar, using Bhatavdekar 's camera, was filming the famed Delhi Durbar in 1911. This was held in Delhi, India to commemorate the coronation of King George V. They also filmed the funeral of Lokmanya Tilak in 1920.

He formed a partnership with V.P. Divekar, A.P. Karandikar, Ranade and Bhatkhande to set up the production company called Patankar Union. Their initial production Savitri, a "hundred-foot-long film and produced in 1912", was a washout as the film came out blank. In 1915 they produced Murder Of Narayanrao Peshwa, which was directed by Patankar. The film is cited as one of the first historical film made in India. Patankar went on to be the cinematographer as well as the director for all his films.

Patankar's association with Dwarkadas Sampat in 1917, led to the formation of his second production company called Patankar Friends and Company from 1918 to 1920, with scripts written by Mohanlal Dave. Patankar's first film with this company, King Shriyal, was released in 1918. He made Ram Vanvas or Exile of Lord Rama (1918) in four parts, thus making it the first Indian serial. KachDevyani (1920), directed and photographed by Patankar, had a Gujarati milieu, with traditional and folk dances incorporated in the film. Instead of using male actors in female roles as was the norm, Sampat organised two girls from Calcutta to play female lead.

Sampat and Patankar separated soon by 1920, due to disagreements and Patankar started a third studio, National Film (1922), which was financed by Thakurdas Vakil and Harilal. He then set up a fourth production house called Pioneer Films with the help of Vazir Haji, who financed him.

== Filmography ==
List of films:

Year	Title
1912	Savitri
1913	Jaimini
1913	Vyas
1915	The Death of Narayanrao Peshwa
1916	Prahlad Charitra
1917	Bhakta Pralhad
1918	Raja Shriyal
1918	Ram Vanvas a.k.a. Exile Of Rama
1919	Kabir Kamal
1919	Kacha Devayani
1919	Narasinh Avatar
1920	Katorabhar Khoon
1920	Sati Madalasa
1920	Sita Swayamvar
1920	Shakuntala
1920	Vichitra Gutika
1922	Bhakta Bodana
1922	Jadunath
1922	Kalidas
1922	Karna
1922	King Bhartrahari
1922	Mahashweta Kadambari
1922	Sati Anjani
1923	Krishna Satyabhama
1923	Ranakdevi
1923	Sati Veermati
1923	Shri Dnyaneshwar
1923	Shri Krishna Bhakta Peepaji
1923	Vaman Avatar
1923	Vanraj Chavdo
1923	Videhi Janak
1923	Durvas Shaap
1923	Shri Markandeya Avatar
1923	Guru Machhindranath
1924	Karan Ghelo
1926	Abola Rani
1926	Chatra Bakavali
1926	Dorangi Duniya
1926	Kacha Devayani
1926	Manovijaya
1926	Paanch Mahabhoot
1926	Satyavijaya
