= Kohinoor Film Company =

Indian film studio

- Company type: Film production; Film distribution
- Industry: Entertainment
- Genre: Fantasy; mythology
- Founded: 1918–1919
- Founder: Dwarkadas Sampat
- Defunct: 1932
- Headquarters: Mumbai, India
- Products: Mostly silent films

Kohinoor Film Company was an Indian film studio established in 1919 by Dwarkadas Sampat (1884-1958). According to Ashish Rajadhyaksha and Paul Willemen, it was the largest and most influential studio of the Indian silent film era. The studio gained national prominence when its 1921 film Bhakta Vidur, was banned by the British colonial government on the ground that the character Vidur, played by its producer Sampat, was "portrayed as a 'thinly-clad version' of Mahatma Gandhi."

Under Kohinoor, directors such as Kanjibhai Rathod and Homi Master made some of the most popular films of the era. For example, under Rathod's direction, the 1924 film Gul-e-Bakavali is widely regarded as the 'first all-India super hit'. Several stars of the time such as Zubeida, Khalil, and Raja Sandow started their careers at the studio. Film scholar Suresh Chabria, a former director of the National Film Archive of India, argues that Kohinoor Film Company was "perhaps the first Indian studio to decisively move away from the artisanal production practices of D. G. Phalke, S. N. Patankar, and others."

== History ==
Dwarkadas Narendas Sampat (1884–1958) started his career in Indian cinema in 1904, when he brought a projector and began to organise film screenings in Rajkot, Bombay Presidency. He later entered film production and, through a partnership with S. N. Patankar, established Patankar Friends & Co, which, according to Rajadhyaksha and Willemen, 'took off in 1917' with Sampat's entry.

Film historian Amrit Gangar notes that Sampat established the Kohinoor Film Company after differences with Patankar.

The studio also trained such people as Nandlal Jaswantlal and Mohan Bhavnani, and produced artists such as Goharbai, Zebunissa and Rampiyari.

Along with Ranjit Movietone and the Imperial Film Company it was the largest movie studio when Indian talkies began in the 1930s.

== Filmography ==
Film	Year	Director	Notes
Vikram Urvashi	1920	Kanjibhai Rathod	
Mahasati Ansuya	1921	–	
Bhakta Vidur	1921	–	
Sukanya Savitri	1922	–	
Gul-e-Bakavali	1924	–	
Bismi Sadi	1924	Homi Master	
Kala Naag	1924	K. Rathod	
Cinema Ni Rani	1925	Mohan Bhavnani	
Fankdo Fituri	1925	Homi Master	
Kulin Kanta	1925	–	
Lanka Ni Laadi	1925	–	
Mojili Mumbai	1925	Manilal Joshi	
Veer Kunal	1925	–	
Telephone Ni Taruni	1926	Homi Master	
Bhaneli Bhamini	1927	–	
Gunsundari	1927	Chandulal Shah	
Daily Mail	1930	Narayan G. Devare	
