= Kanjibhai Rathod =

Indian film director

- Born: Kanjibhai Rathod; Maroli, Gujarat, India
- Occupation: Film director

Kanjibhai Rathod was an Indian film director.

== Early life ==
Kanjibhai Rathod from Maroli village in Navsari district of south Gujarat, was considered the first successful director in Indian cinema. His rise to fame in an era when most people stayed away from films due to a peculiar stigma attached to the filmdom.

Not much is known about Rathod's personal life. Film historian Virchand Dharamsey writes, "Kanjibhai was coming from a Dalit family and he can be considered the first successful professional director of India."

== Career ==
Rathod began as a still photographer with the Oriental Film Company. His experience earned him a job in Kohinoor Film Company and its owner Dwarkadas Sampat made him a director.

Rathod's Bhakta Vidur, released in 1921, was perhaps the first criticism of the British colonialism in a popular feature film. This mythological allegory directly alluded to political issues, particularly the controversy over the Rowlatt Act. An adaptation from a section of the Mahabharata, this film showed the British as the Kauravas and its protagonist Vidur as Gandhi. Sampat himself played the role donning the Gandhi cap and khadi shirt. The film raised a storm - while a big hit in Bombay, it was banned by the British in Karachi and Madras, write historians.

Rathod was the first film-maker to direct a crime thriller in 1920s on contemporary events. His Kala Naag (1924) was based on famous double murder case in Bombay. Rathod introduced Zubaida to film industry with his Gul-e-bakavali.

By the time he left for Saurashtra Film Company in Rajkot in 1924, Rathod had enough work on his name. At the launch of Krishna Film Company, he returned to Mumbai in 1931, the year of first talkies.

Dharamsey writes in his 'Light of Asia: Indian Silent Cinema 1912–1934' that Rathod directed five talkies out of 17 made in 1931. He remained active in the industry even in 1940s, but he was not as successful directing talkies.

== Filmography ==
=== Director ===
- Shethno Salo (1949)
- Anjaam (1940)
- Sairandhri (1939)
- Ghunghatwali (1938)
- Gul Badan (1937)
- Punjab Ka Sinh (1936)
- Hothal Padmini (1934)
- Iraq Ka Chor (1934)
- Jaan Nissar (1934)
- Sati Anjani (1934)
- Lanka Dahan (1933)
- Bhakta Prahlad (1932)
- Bhasmasur Mohini (1932)
- Chintamani (1931)
- Ghar Ki Lakshmi (1931)
- Harishchandra (1931)
- Laila Majnu (1931)
- Pak Daman (1931)
- Math No Sadhu (1930)
- Nirbhagi Nirmala (1930)
- Rajkumari Ni Rangarjana (1930)
- Tati Talwar (1930)
- Kono Vank (1929)
- Raj Hansa (1929)
- Rukmini Haran (1929)
- Veer Rathod (1929)
- Bodku Mathu (1928)
- Chandrahasa
- Devkanya
- Kal Ratrinu Khuni Khanjar
- Kunji Kishori
- Neelam Manek (1928)
- Kuldeepak (1927)
- Mahasati Ansuya (1927)
- Mardna Gha (1927)
- Bolti Bulbul (1926)
- Burkhawali (1926)
- Khubsoorat Bala (1926)
- Raja Ne Gami Te Rani (1926)
- Veer Kasari (1926)
- Anath Abala (1925)
- Baap Kamai (1925)
- Kamallata (1925)
- Swapna Sundari (1925)
- Gul-e-Bakavali (1924)
- Kala Naag (1924)
- Sadguni Sushila (1924)
- Sati Seeta (1925)
- Shareef Badmash (1924)
- Goswami Tulsidas (1923)
- Karmadevi (1923)
- Minal Devi (1923)
- Sati Narmada (1923)
- Shri Balkrishna (1923)
- Shuk Deo (1923)
- Veer Bhimsen (1923)
- Vratasur Vadha (1923)
- Ajamil (1922)
- Bhakta Ambarish (1922)
- Devi Todi (1922)
- Malati Madhav (1922)
- Parashuram (1922)
- Sati Toral (1922)
- Shri Satyanarayan (1922)
- Sukanya Savitri (1922)
- Surya Kumari (1922)
- Bhakta Vidur (1921)
- Chandrahasa (1921)
- Krishna Maya (1921)
- Mahasati Ansuya (1921)
- Meerabai (1921)
- Pundalik (1921)
- Rukmini Haran (1921)
- Subhadra Haran (1921)
- Vishwamitra Menaka (1921)
- Vikram Urvashi (1920)

=== Production manager ===
- Saranga (1961)
