= Pervez Sajjad =

Pakistani cricketer (born 1942)

Personal information
- Born: 30 August 1942 (age 84); Lahore, Punjab, British India (now Pakistan)
- Batting: Right-handed
- Bowling: Slow left-arm orthodox
- Role: Bowler
- Relatives: Waqar Hasan (brother); Jamila Razzaq (sister-in-law)

International information
- National side: Pakistan (1964–1973)
- Test debut (cap 45): 24 October 1964 v Australia
- Last Test: 16 March 1973 v England

Career statistics
Competition	Tests	First-class
Matches	19	133
Runs scored	123	786
Batting average	13.66	10.48
100s/50s	0/0	0/1
Top score	24	56*
Balls bowled	4,145	27,300
Wickets	59	493
Bowling average	23.89	21.80
5 wickets in innings	3	28
10 wickets in match	0	6
Best bowling	7/74	8/89
Catches/stumpings	9/–	57/–
- Source: ESPNcricinfo, 10 March 2013

Pervez Sajjad Hasan (Urdu: پرویز سجاد حسن; born 30 August 1942, Lahore, Punjab) is a Pakistani former cricketer who played in 19 Tests from 1964 to 1973.

== Family ==
He was one of seven brothers. One of his brothers was the 1950s Pakistani Test cricketer Waqar Hasan, and another was the film director and producer Iqbal Shehzad. His brother Waqar married Jamila Razzaq, the daughter of actress Sultana Razzaq, one of the earliest film actresses from India who acted both in silent movies and later in talkies. Jamila is also the granddaughter of India's first female film director, Fatma Begum and happens to be the great niece of Zubeida (the leading actress of India's first talkie film Alam Ara (1931)), who was the younger sister of her mother Sultana.

== First-class career ==
Pervez Sajjad made his first-class debut in 1961–62 and took 22 wickets for 148 runs in his first two matches. He took 5 for 15 and 4 for 35 in Lahore A's innings victory over Railways in the Quaid-e-Azam Trophy, then took 7 for 33 (all bowled) and 6 for 65 against Combined Services, although Combined Services won.

His best innings and match figures were 7 for 23 and 8 for 89 – 15 for 112 in the match – for Karachi against Khairpur in 1968–69 in a quarter-final of the Quaid-e-Azam Trophy. He played first-class cricket until 1973–74.

== Test career ==
Sajjad played 19 Tests for Pakistan as a cunning left-arm legspinner whose forte was being effective even on unhelpful tracks. In all, he took 59 economical wickets, including five wickets in an innings three times, always against New Zealand. At Auckland in 1964–65 he finished with 5 for 42. In the 1969–70 series, he took 22 wickets at only 15.63, including 5 for 33 at Karachi and his Test-best 7 for 74 at Lahore.

== Later career ==
He worked as an assistant to his brother Iqbal Shehzad on several films. His major career was with Pakistan International Airlines, for whom when he retired he was General Manager in Paris.
