= List of Hindi films of 1927 =

A list of films produced by the Bollywood film industry based in Mumbai in 1927:

== 1927 ==
=== Indian cinema in 1927 ===
- 108 films were produced in 1927. The "Report of the Indian Cinematograph Committee 1927-28", formed in 1927 to study cinema in India, categorised the films in different genres, mainly as "religious, mythological, historical and social dramas".
- Radio broadcast, which had started as private radio clubs in 1923, became organised, and the private Indian Broadcasting Company was formed in 1927.

=== Films ===
- Balidan based on a play by Rabindranath Tagore, was directed by Naval Gandhi for Orient Pictures Corporation. It was a social reformist film, which involved a "progressive, rational king and an orthodox, ritual-bound priest". The film was hailed as "An excellent and truly Indian film" by The Indian Cinematograph Committee, 1927. It has been cited by P. K. Nair as one of the top ten lost films of Indian Cinema.
- Chandidas directed by Jyotish Bannerjee was based on the poet-saint Chandidas, and was one of the early "key" films produced by New Theatres. It was adapted to screen from a play written by Agha Hashar Kashmiri.
- Dil Farosh, also called Merchant Of Hearts, directed by M. Udwadia for Excelsior Film Company. It has been cited by Dionne and Kapadia as the first silent version of a Shakespeare drama adapted from a play of the same name, written by Mehdi Hasan 'Ahsan' in 1900. The play was based on The Merchant of Venice. Credit for bringing Shakespeare to Indian Cinema normally has been given to Sohrab Modi for his Talkie version of Hamlet, Khoon Ka Khoon (1935).
- Durgesh Nandini directed by Priyanath Ganguly and produced by Madan Theatres Ltd, was based on Bankim Chandra Chattopadhyay's novel of the same name. This was one of the three films based on Chattopadhyay's stories that Seeta Devi acted in, the others were Krishnakanta's Will (1927), and Kapalkundala (1929).

== A-C ==
Title	Director	Cast	Genre	Notes Cinematographer
Adbhoot Khoon a.k.a. Horrible Murder				United Pictures Syndicate
A Fair Warrior a.k.a. Shoor Killedarin	Vishnupant Aundhkar	Gangubai, Wamanrao Kulkarni	Historical	United Pictures Syndicate; DOP: Pandurang Talegiri
Alladin and His Wonderful Lamp a.k.a. Alladdin Ane Jadui Fanas	Bhagwati Prasad Mishra	Zebunissa, Yusuf, Elizer	Fantasy	Imperial Film Company
Allah Ka Pyara	K. P. Bhave	Elizer, Zebunissa, Jamshedji, Madanrai Vakil, Indira Devi, Mehboob Khan		Imperial Film Company; DOP: Adi Irani
Alibaba and the Forty Thieves a.k.a. Alibaba Chalis Chor	Bhagwati Prasad Mishra	Sulochana (Ruby Myers, Elizer, Jamshedji Khansaheb, Jilloobai, Madanrai Vakil	Fantasy	Imperial Film Company; DOP: Rustom Irani
Asuri Lalsa	Nanubhai B. Desai	Master Vithal, Janibabu, Kumudini, Malka		Sharda Film Company
At The Clang Of Fetters a.k.a. Janjir Ne Jhankhare	Harshadrai Mehta	Nandram, Gulab, Haidershah, P. R. Joshi, Gangaram, Sultan Alam	Action	Krishna Film Co; DOP: Chimanlal Luhar
Balidan a.k.a. Sacrifice	Naval Gandhi	Sulochana (Ruby Myers), Zubeida, Master Vithal, Jal Khambatta, J. Makhijani	Social Costume	Writers: Jamshed Ratnagar, based on a play by Rabindranath Tagore. Orient Pictures Corporation; DOP: Naval Bhatt
Bansari Bala a.k.a. Fairy Of The Flute	A. P. Kapoor	Master Vithal, Madhuri, Jani Babu, Asha, Meherbanu	Fantasy	Sharda Film Company; DOP: Naval Bhatt
Be Ghadi Mouj a.k.a. Pleasure Mad	Narayan Deware	R. N. Vaidya, Jamuna, Rustomji Patel, Thomas, Rajababu	Social	Kohinoor Film Co Narayan Deware
Bhakta Sudama	Dadasaheb Phalke	Bhaurao Datar, Kshirsagar	Devotional	Hindustan Cinema Film Company, Nasik
Bhaneli Bhamini a.k.a. Educated Wife	Homi Master	Gohar, Raja Sandow P.K., R.N. Vaidya, Master Kishore	Social	Kohinoor Film Company
Bhedi Trishul a.k.a. Hidden Treasure	Nanubhai B. Desai	Master Vithal, Miss Mani, Prabhashankar, Janibabu, Lobo, A. P. Kapoor	Action	Sharda Film Company; DOP: Naval Bhatt
Bhim Sanjivan a.k.a. How Bhim Was Brought Back To Life	G. V. Sane	Bhaurao Datar, Anasuya	Devotional	Hindustan Cinema Film Company, Nasik; DOP: Anna Salunke
Chandidas a.k.a. Shree Krishna's Devotee	Jyotish Bannerjee	Patience Cooper, Jyotsna Devi, Tulsi Bannerjee, Purnima Devi, Nilima Devi, Manorama, Pullanalini	Devotional	
Cultured Criminal a.k.a. Sudheral Shaitan			Social	Saurashtra Film Co., Rajkot

== D-J ==
Title	Director	Cast	Genre	Notes Cinematographer
Daksha Yagna	G. V. Sane	Bhaurao Datar, Anasuya, Bachu Pawar, Gangubai Mohite	Devotional	Hindustan Cinema Film Company, Nasik
Dasavatar	R. S. Prakash		Mythology	
Daya Ni Devi a.k.a. The Nurse	Mohan Dayaram Bhavnani	Sulochana (Ruby Myers), D. Billimoria, Jamshedji	Social	Imperial Film Company
Detective Kumar	K. B. Athavale	K. B. Athavale, Rampyari, Nalini, Salvi	Social	Excelsior Film Co; DOP: D. D. Dabke
Dilfarosh a.k.a. Merchant Of Hearts	M. Udwadia	M. Udwadia, K. B. Athavale, Nargis, Saiyed Umer	Costume Drama	Based on Merchant of Venice. Excelsior Film Co. DOP: D. D. Dabke
Draupadi Vastraharan	Dadasaheb Phalke	Baburao Datar, Gangubai Mohite, Bachoba	Mythology	Hindustan Cinema Film Company, Nasik; DOP: Anna Salunke
Durgesh Nandini	Priyanath Ganguly	Patience Cooper, Seeta Devi, Durgadas Bannerjee, Ahindra Chowdhury, Naresh Mitra, Jainarayan Mukherjee, Indira Devi, Geeta, Kanu Bannerjee, Prabodh Bose, Kanaknarayan Bhup	Romance Legend	Based on Bankim Chandra Chattopadhyay's novel, Durgeshnandini. Madan Theatres Ltd. Dop: Manglu
Eighth Incarnation a.k.a. Krishna Sambhav	N. D. Sarpotdar	Gangubai, Wamanrao Kulkarni	Religious	United Pictures Syndicate; DOP: V. V. Date
E Kon? a.k.a. Who	J. Jhaveri	Blanche Verne		Sri Ram Film Company
Fairy Of Delhi a.k.a. Rangmahal Ni Ramani	Homi Master	Shahzadi, Khalil	Costume	Kohinoor Film Company; DOP: Pandurang S. Naik
Gandharva Kanya a.k.a. The Reunion		Nandram, Leena, Gangaram, durga, Chandra, Nizam	Costume	Krishna Film Company
Glory Of Virtue a.k.a. Sheel Prabhav	Vishnupant Aundhkar		Social	United Pictures Syndicate
Goddess of Love	Fatma Begum	Fatma Begum		
Guarding Angel	K. P. Bhave	Zebunisa, Khansaheb, Jamshedji	Social	
Gulzar a.k.a. The Horrors Of Slavery	Nanubhai Desai	Yakub, Jani Babu, Mallika, Mani	Costume	Sharda Film Company; DOP: Naval Bhatt
Gunsundari a.k.a. Why Husbands Go Astray	Chandulal Shah	Raja Sandow, Gohar, Rampyari, R. N. Vaidya, Jumna	Social	Kohinoor Film Company; DOP: Narayan Deware
Hanuman Janma a.k.a. The Birth Of Hanuman	Dadasaheb Phalke	Bhaurao Datar, Yamuna Gole, Laxman Malusare	Religious	Hindustan Cinema Film Company, Nasik; DOP: Anna Salunke
Jaane-E-Alam Anjumanara	Nanubhai B. Desai	Janibabu, Kumudini, Mallika	Fantasy	Sharda Film Company
Jana	Priyanath Ganguly	Patience Cooper, Dinesh Ranjan Das, Indira Devi, Krishnadan Mukherjee, Tulsi Bannerjee	Mythology	Madan Theatres Ltd.
Jewelled Arrow a.k.a. Poonam No Chand a.k.a. Ratna Baan	Bhagwati Mishra	Zebunissa, Indira Devi, Elizer, Jamshedji	Costume	British India Film Co., Imperial Film Company

== K-N ==
Title	Director	Cast	Genre	Notes Cinematographer
Kailash Kumari a.k.a. Sansar Shatranj	Nanubhai Desai	Miss Mani, Jani Babu, Mallika		Sharda Film Company; DOP: Naval Bhatt
Kala Pahad a.k.a. Masked Teror	A. P. Kapoor	Shanta Kumari, Master Vithal, Kumudini	Costume	Sharda Film Company
Keshavkant B.A. a.k.a. Chastity Versus Unchastity	Harshadrai Mehta	Nandram, Keshavlal, Yakbal, Nizam	Social	Krishna Film Company; DOP: Chimanlal Luhar
Krishnakanta's Will a.k.a. Krishnakanter Will	Priyanath Ganguly	Patience Cooper, Seeta Devi, Durgadas Bannerjee, Ahindra Chowdhury, Naresh Mitra, Jainarayan Mukherjee, Indira Devi, Geeta, Kanu Bannerjee, Prabodh Bose, Kartik Dey	Social	Based on Bankim Chandra Chattopadhyay's. Madan Theatres Ltd. Dop: Charles Creed, Jatin Das
Krishna Sakha	Ahindra Choudhury	Santosh Sinha, Ahindra Choudhury, Saraswati, Brojendra Sirkar, Firozbala, Sushil Ghosh, Saraswati Devi, Tarakbala	Religious	Aurora Film Company, Calcutta; DOP: Debi Ghosh
Kalapani No Kaidi a.k.a. Return Of Kala Naag	Homi Master	Shakuntla, Homi Master, Janki, Khalil	Costume	Kohinoor Film Company; DOP: Pandurang S. Naik
Kicks Of Kismet a.k.a. Naseeb Ni Lila	Mohan Dayaram Bhavnani	Sulochana (Ruby Myers), Madanrai Vakil, Ermeline, Jilloobai	Social	Imperial Film Company
Kimti Aansu a.k.a. Precious Tears	Harshadrai Mehta	Nandram, Yakbal, Nizam, P. R. Joshi, Vishnu	Social	Krishna Film Company; DOP: Chimanlal Luhar
Kul Deepak a.k.a. Born Hero	Kanjibhai Rathod	Gulabbai, Haider Shah, Nandram, Durga, Nizam	Social	Krishna Film Company; DOP: Chimanlal Luhar
Laila Majnu a.k.a. Laila And Majnu	Manilal Joshi	Zubeida, Madanrai Vakil, Shahzadi	Legend Romance	Excelsior Film Company; DOP: D. D. Dabke
Lohika Lilam a.k.a. Soul Of Slave	Manilal Joshi	Heera, Nargis	Costume	Excelsior Film Company; DOP: D. D. Dabke
Madalasa	G.V. Sane	Bhaurao Datar, Anasuya	Devotional	Hindustan Cinema Film Co., Nasik; DOP: Anna Salunke
Mahasati Ansuya	Kanjibhai Rathod	Master Vithal, Sakina	Devotional	Krishna Film Company; DOP: Chaturbhai Patel
Master Stroke a.k.a. Mardna Gha	Kanjibhai Rathod	Haider Shah, Nandram, Gulab, Chandra, Gangaram, Sakina	Social	Krishna Film Company; DOP: Chaturbhai Patel
Mohabbat Ke Musibat a.k.a. Love And Romance	M. M. Vaidya			Saurashtra Film Co., Rajkot
Mohana Rani a.k.a. Rani Mohana a.k.a. Chhelbatao	Dinshaw Jhaveri	Madanrai Vakil, Jilloobai, Putli		Royal Art Studio
Muraliwala	Baburao Painter	V. Shantaram, Madhusudan, Sushila Devi, Lalya Gokhale, Bal Gangar	Religious	Maharashtra Film Company, Kolhapur; DOP: S. Fattelal
Nala Damayanti	Dadasaheb Phalke	Bachchuram, Bhaurao Datar, Gangubai Mohite, Khirsagar Salanki, Gotiram	Mythology	Hindustan Cinema Film Co., Nasik; DOP: Telang
Nanand Bhojai a.k.a. The Victim Of Society	Manilal Joshi	Zubeida, Thatte, Miss Mani, S. Nazir, Nargis, Gangaram, Takle, Rani, Udwadia	Social	Excelsior Film Company; DOP: D. D. Dabke
Naqli Rani a.k.a. Sham Queen	Harshadrai Mehta	Zebunisa, Prabhashankar, Harihar Diwana, Gangaram, Miss Mary, Janibabu	Costume	Sharda Film Company; DOP: Naval Bhatt
Nari Ki Nagan a.k.a. Soul Of A Snake	K. P. Bhave	Madanrai Vakil, Tara, Baburao Sansare, Dinkar, Jilloobai, Dhanji	Fantasy	Imperial Film Company; DOP: Rustom Irani
Netaji Palkar a.k.a. Beloved Leader Palkar	Keshavrao Dhaiber, V. Shantaram	Balasaheb Yadav, Vasantrao Deshpande, Sushila Devi, Zunzharrao Pawar, Anasuya, Ganpat Bakre, Mane, Gulabbai	Historical	Maharashtra Film Company, Kolhapur; DOP: S. Fattelal

== P-S ==
Title	Director	Cast	Genre	Notes Cinematographer
Pandav Rajasuya Yagam			Mythology	Exhibitors Film Service
Parsa Eblis a.k.a. Pavitra Satan	Manilal Joshi	Nargis, Athavale	Social	Excelsior Film Company; DOP: D. D. Dabke
Pita Pooja				Madan Theatres Ltd.
Prem Ni Pratima a.k.a. Lovers	Manilal Joshi	Blanche Verne		Excelsior Film Company; DOP: D. D. Dabke
Princess Laila	Rama Choudhary	Blanche Verne, Elizer, Madanrai Vakil, Jilloobai, La Tosca, Miss Helen	Costume	La Tosca Productions
Punarjanma a.k.a. Incarnation	Jaygopal Pillai	Atul Sen, Funniman, Kedar Chatterjee, Premankur Atorthy, Indira Devi, Artidevi, Bhanu Bannerjee Sr.	Costume	Indian Kinema Arts, Calcutta; DOP: Nitin Bose
Raghunathrao and Sarayubala	Madanrai Vakil	Jilloobai, P. R. Joshi	Semi-historical Romance	Royal Art Studio; DOP: Rustom Irani
Reshmi Sari a.k.a. Follies Of The Rich	Nanubhai Desai	Jani Babu, A. P. Kapoor, Mani, Mary	Social	Sharda Film Company; DOP: Bhogilal Dave
Roop Sundari a.k.a. Ideal Womanhood a.k.a. Adarsha Veerangana	Harshadrai Mehta	Nandram, Gulb, Durga, Chanda	Social	Krishna Film Company; DOP: Chimanlal Luhar
Rukamangada Mohini	Dadsaheb Phalke	Ganpat Shinde, Gangubai Mohite	Devotional	Hindustan Cinema Film Co., Nasik
Sansar a.k.a. A Phase Of Life	V. K. Pattani		Social	Saurashtra Film Co. DOP: Rajkot Champaklal Pattani
Sati Madri a.k.a. Pious Madri	Narayan Deware, Chandulal Shah	Raja Sandow, Gohar	Devotional	Kohinoor Film Company; DOP: Pandurang S. Naik
Sati Savitri a.k.a. Ideal Wife	Baburao Painter	V. Shantaram, Sushila Devi, Zunzharrao Pawar, Nimbalkar, Balasaheb Yadav, Gulabbai	Social	Maharashtra Film Company, Kolhapur; DOP: S. Fattelal
Sati Savitri a.k.a. Savitri Satyavan a.k.a. Ideal Wife	Pandurang Talegiri	Gangubai, Wamanrao Kulkarni, Baburao Gade, Pandurang Varne	Mythology	United Pictures Syndicate; DOP: Y. D. Sarpotdar
Satsang				Aurora Film Company
Savaliya Tandel				South Indian Film Company of Sholapur
Shankaracharya a.k.a. Renaissance Of Hinduism	Kali Prasad Ghose (K. P. Ghose)	Jiban Gangopadhyay, Dhirendranath Ganguly, Leela Mukherjee, Nirmalendu Lahiri, Kartik Dey, Ahi Sanyal, Manmatha Pal	Devotional	Indian Kinema Arts, Calcutta; DOP: Noni Gopal Sanyal, P. Sanyal
Sharad Purnima a.k.a. A Full Moon Night In Spring	Harshadrai Mehta	Gulab, Nandram, Keshavlal, Gangaram	Social	Krishna Film Company; DOP: Chimanlal Luhar
Sheel Prabhav a.k.a. Glory Of Virtue	Vishnupant Aundhkar			United Pictures Syndicate
Shiraz-Ud-Dowla a.k.a. By Sheer Valour	Dhanjibhai K. Desai	Master Vithal, Zebunisa, Tara, Asha, Kumudini, Miss Dwarki, Gangaram	Costume Historical	Ideal Pictures Corp., Sharda Film Company; DOP: Bhogilal Dave
Shri Krishna Nardi	K. P. Bhave	Jamshedji Khansaheb, Putli, Jilloobai	Religious	Imperial Film Company
Shrimati Nalini a.k.a. Mrs. Nalini	Manilal Joshi	Nargis, Yakbal, Takle	Social	Excelsior Film Company; DOP: D. D. Dabke
Sindh Ni Sumari a.k.a. Sumari Of Sind	Chandulal Shah	Gohar, Raja Sandow, Noor Mohammed Charlie, Yakbal, Leena	Costume	Kohinoor Film Company; DOP: Pandurang S. Naik, Narayan Deware
Swadesh Seva a.k.a. My Country	Harshadrai Mehta	Master Vithal, Lobo	Historical	Sharda Film Company

== T-Z ==
Title	Director	Cast	Genre	Notes Cinematographer
Tainted Virtue a.k.a. Karmaili Kali	Rama S. Choudhury	Ermeline, Madanrai Vakil	Social	Imperial Film Company; DOP: Rustom Irani
The Dancing Girl a.k.a. Gutter Nu Gulab	Bhagwati Prasad Mishra	Sulochana (Ruby Myers), Madanrai Vakil, Elizer, Putli, Jamshedji, K. P. Bhave, Sakhu	Social	Imperial Film Company; DOP: Rustom Irani
The Mission Girl a.k.a. Christian Kumari	Homi Master	Raja Sandow, Sulochana (Ruby Myrs), Heera, Khalil, Miss Mani	Social	Kohinoor Film Company; DOP: Pandurang S. Naik
Thoratanchi Kamla a.k.a. Kamla Of The Thorats	N. D. Sarpotdar	Gangubai, Wamanrao Kulkarni, Pandurang Varne, Dattoba Rajwade, Baburao Shinde, Bandopant Sohoni	Historical	United Pictures Syndicate; DOP: Pandurang Talegiri
Trust Your Wife a.k.a. Anun Naam Te Bairi	Mohan Dayaram Bhavnani	Miss Mohini, Jamshedji, Jilloobai	Social	Imperial Film Company; DOP: Rustom Irani
Vadia Dhor a.k.a. Unpractical	Harshadrai Mehta		Social	Krishna Film Company; DOP: Chimanlal Luhar
Vande Mataram Ashram	Bhalji Pendharkar	Yamunadevi, Parshwanath Yeshwant Altekar, Baburao Pendharkar	Social	Vande Mataram Film Company; DOP: D. D. Dabke
Veer Garjana a.k.a. Rewards Of Blind Passion	Nanubhai Desai	Master Vithal, Prabhashankar, Kumudini	Action Costume	Sharda Film Company; DOP: Naval Bhat
Vilasi Kanta a.k.a. Flirting Wife		Aundhkar, Wamanrao Kulkarni, Durga, Hansa, Yamuna Gole, Phatak	Social	Social Pictures Corporation
Wildcat of Bombay a.k.a. Mumbai Ni Biladi	Mohan Dayaram Bhavnani	Jamshedji Khansaheb, Sulochana (Ruby Myers), D. Billimoria	Social	Imperial Film Company
Why Sons Go Astray a.k.a. Surat No Sahukar	Homi Master	Sushila, R. N. Vaidya, Khalil, Noor Mohammed Charlie	Social	Kohinoor Film Company; DOP: Narayan Deware
