= Waqar Hasan =

Pakistani cricketer (1932–2020)

Waqar Hasan وقارحسن

Personal information
- Full name: Waqar Hasan Mir
- Born: 12 September 1932; Amritsar, Punjab, British India
- Died: 10 February 2020 (aged 87); Karachi, Sindh, Pakistan
- Batting: Right-handed
- Bowling: Right-arm
- Relatives: Jamila Razzaq (m. 1963–2020) Pervez Sajjad (brother); Sultana (mother-in-law)

International information
- National side: Pakistan (1952–1959)
- Test debut (cap 11): 16 October 1952 v India
- Last Test: 21 November 1959 v Australia

Career statistics
| Competition | Test | First-class |
|---|---|---|
| Matches | 21 | 99 |
| Runs scored | 1,071 | 4,741 |
| Batting average | 31.50 | 35.64 |
| 100s/50s | 1/6 | 8/27 |
| Top score | 189 | 201* |
| Balls bowled | 6 | 294 |
| Wickets | 0 | 2 |
| Bowling average | – | 86.00 |
| 5 wickets in innings | – | 0 |
| 10 wickets in match | – | 0 |
| Best bowling | – | 1/9 |
| Catches/stumpings | 10/– | 47/– |
- Source: Cricinfo, 10 February 2020

Waqar Hasan Mir (Urdu: وقارحسن; 12 September 1932 – 10 February 2020) was a Pakistani cricketer who played in 21 Test matches from 1952 to 1959, and the last surviving member of Pakistan's inaugural Test team. He scored 1,071 runs in Test cricket, and played in 99 first-class matches.

== Cricket career ==
Waqar Hasan attended Government College, Lahore, where he played for the cricket team. He toured England with the Pakistan Eaglets team of young cricketers in 1951.

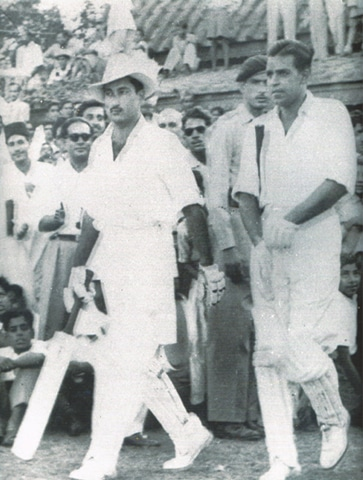
Waqar Hasan (left) and Imtiaz Ahmed come out to bat during the Second Test against New Zealand in 1955.

An "attractive stroke-making right-handed batsman, who was ideal in a crisis", he played in Pakistan's first 18 Tests, including its first five victories. In Pakistan's first Test series, against India in 1952–53, he was the highest scorer on either side, with 357 runs at an average of 44.62, playing several defiant innings when Pakistan were in trouble. He was less successful on the 1954 tour of England, with 103 runs at 14.71, but impressed with his fielding in the covers.

He scored his only Test century against New Zealand in 1955–56 at Lahore, when he made 189 in 430 minutes, adding 309 for the seventh wicket with Imtiaz Ahmed to rescue Pakistan after they had slumped to 111 for 6. His 189 set a new record for Pakistan's highest Test score which lasted only until Ahmed (who made 209) overtook it the next day. Pakistan won the match by 4 wickets. Hasan played five more Tests without reaching 50.

He played first-class cricket in Pakistan from 1949 to 1966, with a highest score of 201 not out for L. W. Cannon's XI against Hasan Mahmood's XI in 1953–54. He captained Karachi Blues to victory in the final of the 1963–64 Quaid-e-Azam Trophy and in his last first-class match he again captained them to victory in the 1964–65 competition.

He served as a national selector several times from the 1960s to the 1980s. He was the chief selector when Pakistan beat India 3–0 at home in 1982–83.

== Personal life ==
Waqar Hasan's family was of Kashmiri descent. He married Jamila Razzaq, the daughter of actress Sultana Razzaq, one of the earliest film actresses from India. Jamila is also the granddaughter of India's first female film director, Fatma Begum, and the niece of Zubeida (the leading actress of India's first talkie film, Alam Ara), who was the younger sister of her mother Sultana.

In 1954 Waqar moved from Lahore to work for the Pakistan Public Works Department in Karachi as a cinema inspector. In the early 1960s he went into business. In 1970, with his partner Abdul Majeed, he took over National Laboratories, a food testing facility, and turned it into the spice-manufacturing company National Foods Limited. In 2002, with the assistance of the cricket journalist Qamar Ahmed, he wrote For Cricket and Country: An Autobiography.

Waqar died aged 87 on 10 February 2020 after suffering from illness for some years. The Pakistan Cricket Board expressed their sorrow, their chairman Ehsan Mani describing Waqar, as "not only an outstanding cricketer but a thorough gentleman who set very high standards".
