= Abdul Karim Muhammad Yakut Khan I =

Nawab of Sachin (1791 – 1802)

Sidi Abdul Karim Muhammad Yakut Khan I (or Balu Mian) was the Nawab of Sachin from 1791 until his death in 1802.

== Biography ==
He was the elder son of Abdul Rahim Khan and the heir to Janjira and other possessions of the Sidis. Following his father's death, he was expelled from Janjira by a younger branch of the family, and Sidi Jauhar Khan seized the throne of Janjira. He then went to the court of Madhavrao II, the Peshwa of the Maratha Confederacy, and presented his grievances to his minister, Nana Fadnavis. He also appealed to the British for assistance. Negotiations were initiated with the objective of securing for him a territory of equal value in another part of the country. On 6 June 1791, an agreement was reached between the parties through the mediation of the British Resident at Pune. The agreement required him to relinquish his claims to Janjira in favour of the Peshwa, to pledge loyalty to the Peshwa, and to refrain from disturbing the districts under British control. In lieu of the land he had ceded to the Peshwa, he was granted a tract of land near Surat, estimated to yield £7,500 annually. Of this land grant, the first installment—comprising 17 villages—was granted to him. However, when it failed to yield the promised revenue, three additional villages were granted to him. Since the Peshwa never managed to claim Janjira, he made no further land grants to Abdul Karim. He initially established his capital at Lajpor on the Mindhola river but later moved it to Sachin. In 1797, he paid nazrana (lit. 'Gift') to Shah Alam II, the Mughal Emperor at Delhi, and obtained the title of Nawab.

He died in 1802, and his son, Ibrahim Muhammad Yakut Khan I, succeeded him as the Nawab of Sachin.
