= Rhea Pillai =

British model (born 1965)

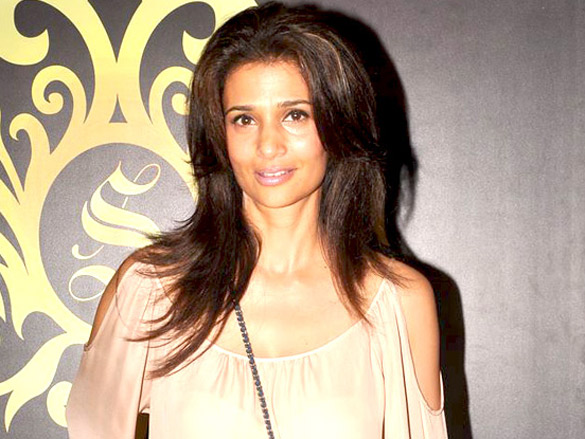
- Born: Rhea Laila Pillai; London, United Kingdom
- Other name: Rhea Dutt
- Occupation: Model
- Spouses: Micheal Vaz (m. 1984; div. 1994) Sanjay Dutt (m. 1998; div. 2008)
- Partner: Leander Paes (2000–2015)
- Children: 1
- Relatives: Fatma Begum (great grandmother); Sidi Ibrahim Muhammad Yakut Khan III (great grandfather); Zubeida (maternal grandmother); Sultana (great aunt); Jamila Razzaq (cousin)

Rhea Laila Pillai is a British model known for her works in television and advertising. In 2003, she was honored as the "Woman of the Year", along with Raveena Tandon, Anoushka Shankar and Ritu Beri, on International Women's Day for social service. In 2006, she had a minor screen role in the Hindi movie Corporate. Pillai is involved in the Art of Living Foundation.

== Early life ==
Pillai was born the daughter of Raymond Pillai and his wife Durr-e-shahwar Dhanrajgir. Both of her parents were of mixed communal heritage, and theirs was also a mixed marriage. Raymond Pillai was the son of a Malayali Hindu father from Kerala and an Anglo-Indian mother, and was raised as a Christian. Durr-e-shahwar Dhanrajgir was the daughter of Maharaja Narsinghraj Dhanrajgir Gyan Bahadur, a Hindu and one of the top noblemen of Hyderabad state, by his consort Zubeida, who hailed from a family of Muslim royals and had acted in the first Indian sound film Alam Ara (1931). She is also the great granddaughter of India's first female film director, Fatma Begum and happens to be the great niece of Sultana, one of the earliest film actresses from India who was the elder sister of her grandmother Zubeida.

== Personal life ==
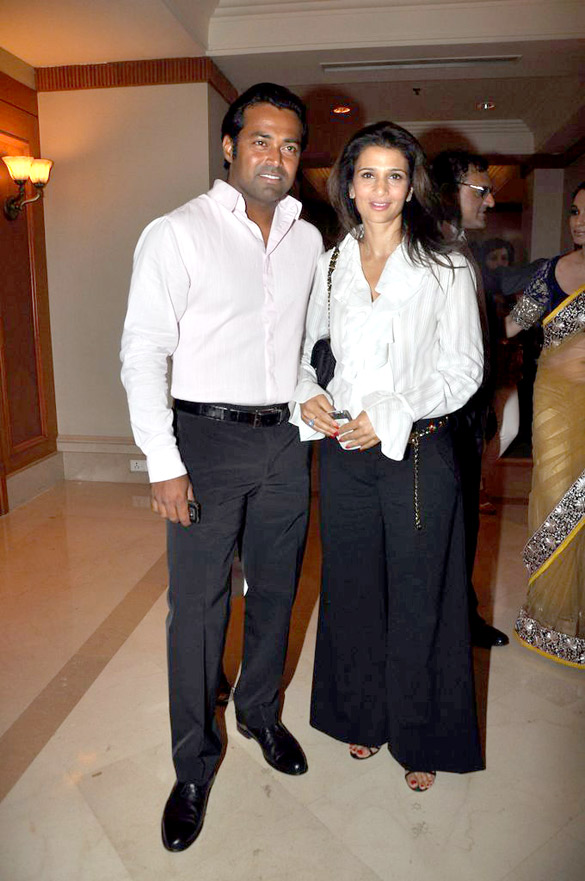
Rhea with Leander Paes, 2012

In 1984, Pillai married a US national named Micheal Vaz. Vaz and Pillai separated in 1988 and got divorced in 1994.

In 1998, Pillai married actor Sanjay Dutt, but they separated after a few years. She stated in 2006 that they remain close friends. After the divorce became official in 2008 and details of the settlement were published by the tabloid MiD DAY, the broadsheet newspaper The Telegraph criticised Pillai for her materialism and her conduct in relation to Dutt.

Pillai had a live-in-relationship with Indian tennis player Leander Paes in the 2000s. The couple has a daughter, Aiyana, born in 2005. She has filed a case against Paes and his father alleging domestic violence in June 2014 at a local metropolitan court. The court found him guilty of various acts of domestic violence in February 2022.

Her daughter, Aiyana Paes is also tennis player who represents Great Britain.
