= Constance Bromley =

British film professional (b. 1882, d. 1939)

- Born: Constance Annie Jubb; 3 July 1882; Leeds
- Died: 19 June 1939 (aged 56); Salisbury
- Known for: Controversial views on Indian film audiences in 1920s

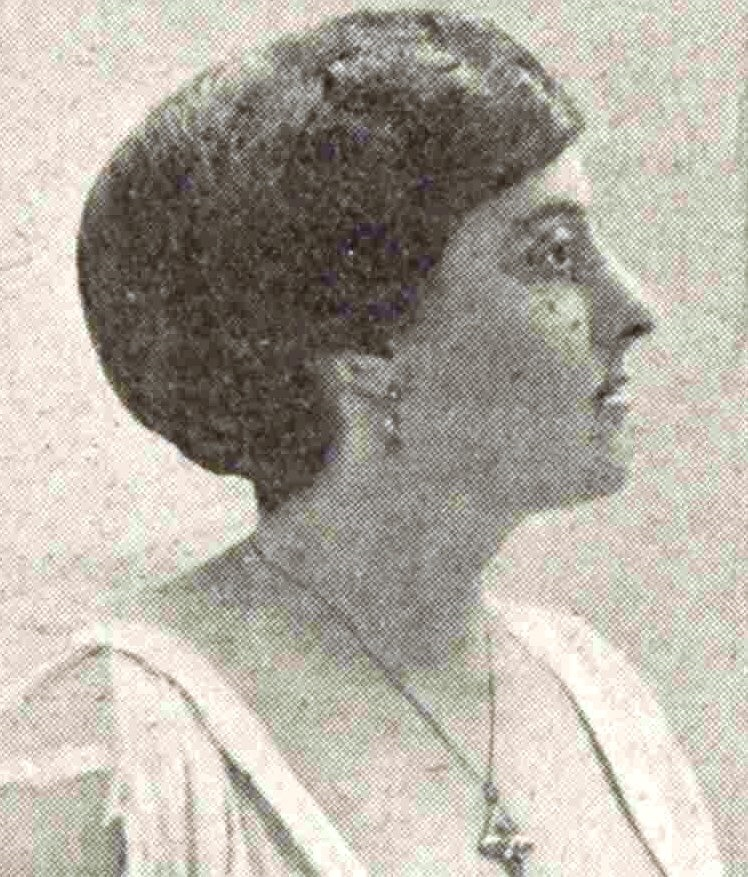
Constance Bromley in 1920

Constance Bromley (1882–1939) was a British actor, writer, magazine editor, cinema manager and film publicist. She is known for controversial articles she wrote in the 1920s about the influence of films on Indian audiences.

== Biography ==
She was born Constance Annie Jubb, in Leeds on 3 July 1882. Professionally she always used the name Constance Bromley (Bromley was her father's middle name). She began her career as an actress, joining the UK touring company of Herbert Beerbohm Tree in 1905. She subsequently joined the touring companies of Charles Frohman, Edward Compton and Frank Benson, for whom played Olivia in Twelfth Night, Emilia in Othello and Gertrude in Hamlet. She also wrote a play, The Ranchman's Romance, produced in Leeds in 1906.

She left acting in 1910 to spend time with friends in India, then with family in Canada. She returned to Britain in 1913, becoming involved in some capacity with Will Barker's epic film Sixty Years a Queen. She may also have written some film scenarios at this time. She joined the Howitt-Phillips touring company as a stage performer in India in 1916. In India she became managing editor of weekly illustrated magazine The Looker-On. She also became secretary-manager of the Grand Opera House in Calcutta, which was converted into a cinema in June 1917.

In 1919 she returned to Britain. There followed a series of interviews and articles in the film trade press and British national newspapers expressing her views about the supposed influence of films from the West on Indian audiences, particularly how 'white women' were portrayed. In an interview she gave to the Daily Mail in July 1919:

"The white woman in India realises that she is receiving less respect from the natives than before, and a great deal of this is due to the indiscriminate showing of films on social and marriage problems...The natives are great film enthusiasts, and there are 14 picture houses in Bombay alone. They will sit right through all the parts of a long serial film from dawn to dusk. The trouble is that most of the audiences are illiterate. The wording on the film is occasionally translated, but even then it is not understood. They, therefore, put any construction they like on the plot of stories, and get their ideas of European women inextricably mixed. They think of their own treatment of women and the rigid customs of law they have to obey. If the women go to the picture theatre they have to sit apart in a well-curtained box. The European women, too, are careful in their conduct, and are not seen in evening dress in public. And then comes the great contrast of the film, where the natives see white women in all sorts of garbs; on one occasion they saw the heroine of a long film, mainly garbed in a bathing costume. They see white wives on the screen in compromising situations, and the result is that they get a low opinion of European morals."

She wrote articles with similar arguments for The Evening News (20 September 1919), the Daily Express (13 January 1921) and The Times (21 February 1922). Bromley wrote at a time of high anxiety among the British Raj at the rise of the independence movement in India, particularly following the Jallianwala Bagh massacre in April 1919. She wanted to see greater film censorship in India and more use of film as British propaganda. Such arguments were largely dismissed by the Indian Cinematograph Committee, formed in 1927 to ""investigate the adequacy of censorship and the supposedly immoral effect of cinematograph films", as lacking any empirical evidence. Her views have been widely cited in modern studies of Indian cinema and imperialism.

Bromley worked in the early 1920s as a film publicist for Trans-Atlantic and Grainger's Exclusives, then operated as an independent publicist until 1925, when she left the film industry. Later she wrote articles and serials for the Leeds Mercury newspaper.

Bromley retired to Salisbury where she died on 19 June 1939.
