= Jamila Razzaq =

Pakistani actress (born 1937)

- Born: Jamila Razzaq Begum; 1937 (age 87–88); Bombay, Maharashtra, British India
- Occupation: Actress
- Years active: 1955–1963
- Spouse: Waqar Hasan (m. 1963; died 2020)
- Children: 3
- Parent(s): Sultana (mother); Seth Razzaq (father)
- Relatives: Fatma Begum (grandmother); Sidi Ibrahim Muhammad Yakut Khan III (grandfather); Zubeida (aunt); Rhea Pillai (cousin); Pervez Sajjad (brother-in-law)

Jamila Razzaq (born 1937) is a Pakistani actress. She is one of the most popular actresses of her time and was one of the most successful actress of 1950s and 1960s. She acted in Urdu films in Pakistani cinema and is known for her roles in the films Naya Dour (1958), Faisala (1959), Aur Bhi Gham Hayn (1960), Gul Bakavli (1961), Inqilab (1962) and Ishq Par Zor Nahin (1963).

== Early life ==
Razzaq was born in 1937 in Bombay at Maharashtra, British India. Her grandmother Fatma Begum was India's first female film director and her grandfather Nawab Sidi Ibrahim Muhammad Yakut Khan III was the ruler of the princely state of Sachin. Her aunts Zubeida and Shahzadi were popular leading actresses during the silent films era, and the former was the leading lady in India's first talkie film Alam Ara (1931).

Razzaq's mother Sultana was a popular actress and one of the earliest film actresses from India, and acted both in silent films and later in the talkies. Sultana moved to Pakistan after Partition in 1947 while her family stayed in India. She remained little active in the Pakistani cinema and produced only one film, Ham Ek Hayn (1961), and later married Seth Razzaq, owner of Adamjee Group of Companies from Karachi.

== Career ==
Razzaq used to perform classical dance and was performing it one day in a private function on her friend's request. At that event, she was spotted by film director Humayun Mirza who offered her a role in his next film, Intekhab (1955). She appeared in the film alongside Masood and Nayyar Sultana.

In 1956, she was cast in the lead role in Fankar alongside Khursheed Bano. The same year, film journalist and director Attaullah Hashmi was looking for a new actress for his film Naya Daur. He was impressed by her talent after seeing her performance in Intekhab and approached her for the film. She appeared in the film with Aslam Pervaiz, Neelo and Yousuf Khan. The film became a box office hit and Razzaq rose to prominence with this film.

In 1959, she played a lead role in Faisala alongside Shamim Ara, Lehri, Deeba and Yousuf Khan. The film was directed by Jafar Bukhari and was a hit film at the box office.

In 1960, she worked in Yeh Dunya with Agha Talish and Lehri which was directed by Nazir Sufi. The same year, she appeared in Aur Bhi Gham Hayn with Talish, Nirala and Lehri which was directed by A.H. Siddiqui. The same year, she was cast in Gul Bakavli, directed by Munshi Dil and starring Sudhir. It was the first film of Pakistani cinema with some scenes in color. The film was a hit at the box office and it further boosted her career.

In 1961, Razzaq appeared in her mother's production Ham Ek Hayn, which was directed by the famous scriptwriter and lyricist Fayyaz Hashmi with A. Hameed as music composer. She starred in the film with Aslam Pervaiz. The film didn't do well initially at the box office but later the film became popular among the audience. Then it received critical acclaim for its script and performances. The film's reputation had shifted over the following years, and many critics now consider the film to be a masterpiece and one of the best films of the 1960s. The following year in 1962, she played the lead role in Inqilab along with Shamim Ara and Habib in lead roles.

In 1963, she was cast by Ilyas Kashmiri in his home production Ishq Par Zor Nahin with Aslam Pervaiz, Neelo, Lehri and Bibbo. The film was directed by Sharif Nayyar and was a super hit at the box office.

== Personal life ==
Jamila married cricketer Waqar Hasan in 1963 and she has three children including one son and two daughters with him.

== Filmography ==
=== Film ===
Year	Film	Language
1955	Intekhab	Urdu
1956	Funkar	Urdu
1958	Neya Dour	Urdu
1959	Faisala	Urdu
1960	Yeh Dunya	Urdu
1960	Aur Bhi Gham Hayn	Urdu
1961	Gul Bakavli	Urdu
1961	Ham Ek Hayn	Urdu
1962	Inqilab	Urdu
1963	Ishq Par Zor Nahin	Urdu
