= Dil Farosh =

1927 film

- Directed by: M. Udvadia
- Written by: Mehdi Hasan 'Ahsan' (adaptation)
- Based on: The Merchant of Venice
- Produced by: Excelsior Film Company
- Starring: M. Udvadia; Nargis
- Cinematography: D. D. Dabke
- Production company: Excelsior Film Company
- Release date: 1927
- Country: India

Dil Farosh also called Merchant Of Hearts, is a 1927 Indian cinema's silent film directed by M. Udvadia. Produced by Excelsior Film Company it has been cited as one of the earliest adaptations of a Shakespeare play into an Indian film. Based on The Merchant of Venice, it was written for the Parsi theatre by Mehdi Hasan 'Ahsan' in 1900, and called Merchant of Hearts. The stage adaptation by the New Alfred Company had Sorabji Ogra as Shylock and "achieved great popularity" at the beginning of the twentieth century. The film's cast included the director Udwadia with Nargis, K. B. Athavale and Saiyed Umer.

== Cast ==
- K. B. Athvale
- Nargis
- M. Udwadia
- Saiyed Umer
