= Sidi Abdul Kadir Khan =

Nawab of Sachin (1873 - 1887)

Abdul Kadir Khan
- Mubariz-ud-Daula; Muzaffar-ul-Mulk; Nusrat Jang

Nawab of Sachin
- Reign: c. 1873 – c. 1887
- Predecessor: Ibrahim Muhammad Yakut Khan II
- Successor: Ibrahim Muhammad Yakut Khan III
- Died: December 1896
- House: Sachin
- Dynasty: Sidi
- Father: Ibrahim Muhammad Yakut Khan II

Sidi Abdul Kadir Khan was the Nawab of Sachin from 1873 until his abdication in 1887.

== Biography ==
Upon the death of his father, Ibrahim Muhammad Yakut Khan II, in 1873, he succeeded him as the Nawab of Sachin. Owing to his minority at the time of accession, the affairs of the state were placed under the supervision of the Agent to the Governor-General of India. Upon attaining majority in July 1886, he was invested with administrative powers. However, within the next six months, he proved to be unfit to rule and was asked to abdicate in favour of his eldest son, Ibrahim Muhammad Yakut Khan III, in 1887. In 1907, when his son was invested with full administrative powers, the kharita he received from the Governor-General of India stated that he had succeeded his grandfather—not him.

He died in December 1896.
