= Sachin State =

Princely state of India

Coordinates: 21.08°N 72.88°E

Sachin State સચીન રિયાસત سچن ریاست
- Princely State of British India
- 1791–1948
- Flag

- Sachin State (pink) within Surat Agency
- Capital: Sachin
- Area
  - 1931: 127 km^{2} (49 sq mi)
- Population
  - 1931: 22,107
- History
  - Established: 1791
  - Independence of India: 1948
| Succeeded by |
| India |
- Today part of: Surat district, Gujarat State

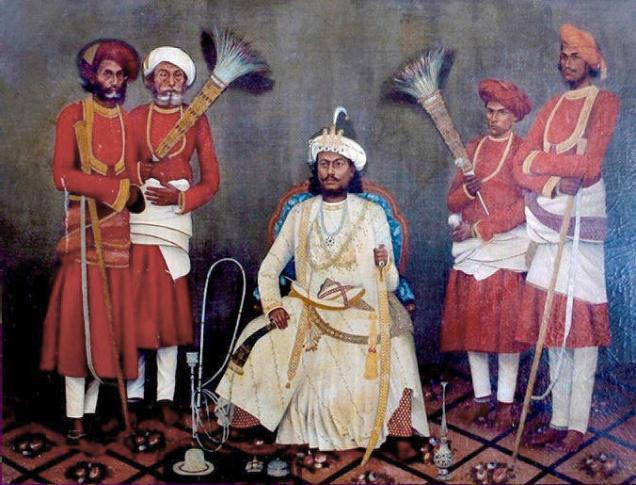
Nawab Ibrahim Mohammad Yakut Khan II of Sachin (1833–1873)

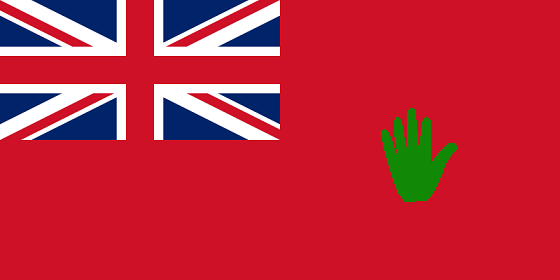
Sachin State Merchant Flag

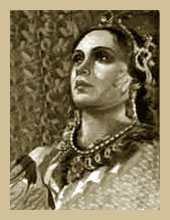
Nawab of Sachin Ibrahim Mohammad Yakut Khan III was married to Fatma Begum. Their marriage ended in a divorce after the Nawab expressed disapproval of her pursuing a career in acting, which was not considered a respectable profession for women from aristocratic families.

The Sachin State (Gujarati: સચીન રિયાસત; Urdu: سچن ریاست) was a princely state belonging to the Surat Agency, former Khandesh Agency, of the Bombay Presidency during the era of the British Raj. Its capital was in Sachin, the southernmost town of present-day Surat district of Gujarat State.

== History ==
Maharaja of Parmar Rajputs had established the State of Sachin. Sachin state was invaded on 6 June 1791. Though over 85% of the subjects were Hindu, the state was ruled by Sunni Muslims of the Siddi dynasty of Danda-Rajpuri and Janjira State. The Siddi dynasty is of Abyssinian (Habesha) origin.

Sachin State was under the protection of the Maratha Peshwa until it became a British protectorate. It had its own cavalry, currency, and stamped paper, as well as a state band that included Africans.

Fatma Begum (1892–1983), one of the early superstars of Hindi cinema and India's first female film director, was married to Nawab Sidi Ibrahim Muhammad Yakut Khan III of Sachin State later she divorced him when she started acting as the Nawab did not approve of her choice to pursue a career in acting and stage dramas, as it was not considered a respectable profession for women from affluent families at that time. In response to his disapproval, she divorced him and took custody of her three daughters, whom she later introduced to the film industry. Sultana, the daughter of Fatima Begum, became a leading figure in early Indian movies. Zubeida, leading actress of India's first talkie film Alam Ara (1931), was her younger sister.

Nawab Sidi Ibrahim Muhammad Yakut Khan III, Sachin State's last ruler, signed the accession to join the Indian Union on 8 March 1948. The state then became part of Surat district in Bombay Province.

After the Partition of India, Zubaida stayed in India, while her sister Sultana moved to Pakistan where she married and had a daughter, Jamila Razzaq, who became a prominent Pakistani actress in the decade between the mid-1950s and the mid-1960s.

== Rulers ==
The rulers of Sachin State bore the title 'Nawab' and were granted the right of a 9 gun salute by the British authorities.

=== Nawabs ===
- 6 Jun 1791 – 9 July 1802 Abdul Karim Mohammad Yakut Khan I (b. 17.. – d. 1802)
- 9 July 1802 – 25 March 1853 Ibrahim Mohammad Yakut Khan I (d. 1853)
- 25 Mar 1853 – 1 December 1868 Abdul Karim Mohammad Yakut Khan II (b. 1802 – d. 1868)
- 1 December 1868 – 4 March 1873 Ibrahim Mohammad Yakut Khan II (b. 1833 – d. 1873)
- 4 March 1873 – 7 January 1887 Abdul Kadir Khan (b. 1865 – d. 1896)
- 4 March 1873 – Jul 1886 .... -Regent
- 7 February 1887 – 19 November 1930 Ibrahim Mohammad Yakut Khan III (b. 1886 – d. 1930)
- 7 February 1887 – 4 May 1907 .... -Regent
- 19 Nov 1930 – 15 August 1947 Muhammad Haider Khan (b. 1909 – d. 1970)

== See also ==
- Siddis of Gujarat
- Surat Agency
- Political integration of India
