= Balidan =

1927 film

- Directed by: Naval Gandhi
- Written by: Rabindranath Tagore; Jamshed Ratnagar (screenplay)
- Based on: Bisarjan (play)
- Produced by: Orient Pictures Corporation
- Starring: Master Vithal; Sulochana; Zubeida; Sultana
- Cinematography: Naval Bhatt
- Production company: Orient Pictures Corporation
- Release date: 1927
- Country: India
- Language: Silent film

Balidan, also called Sacrifice, is a 1927 Indian silent film directed by Naval Gandhi and based on a play by Rabindranath Tagore. It was produced by Orient Pictures Corporation. Balidan is cited as one of the top ten lost films of Indian Cinema by P. K. Nair. Hailed as "an excellent and truly Indian film" by The Indian Cinematograph Committee, 1927–28, Balidan was used by them as one of the films to "show how 'serious' Indian cinema could match Western standards".

The film starred the then popular cast of Master Vithal, Sulochana, Zubeida, Sultana, Jal Khambata and Jani Babu.

A social-reformist costume drama film, written by Tagore in 1887, Balidan was set in the fictional kingdom of Tippera, and involved clashes between a progressive-minded King and a "tradition-bound priest". The film was stated to be commercially successful.

== Cast ==
- Master Vithal
- Sulochana (Ruby Myers)
- Zubeida as Aparna
- Sultana
- Jal Khambata
- Jani Babu
- J. Makhijani
