= Dhanraj Mahal =

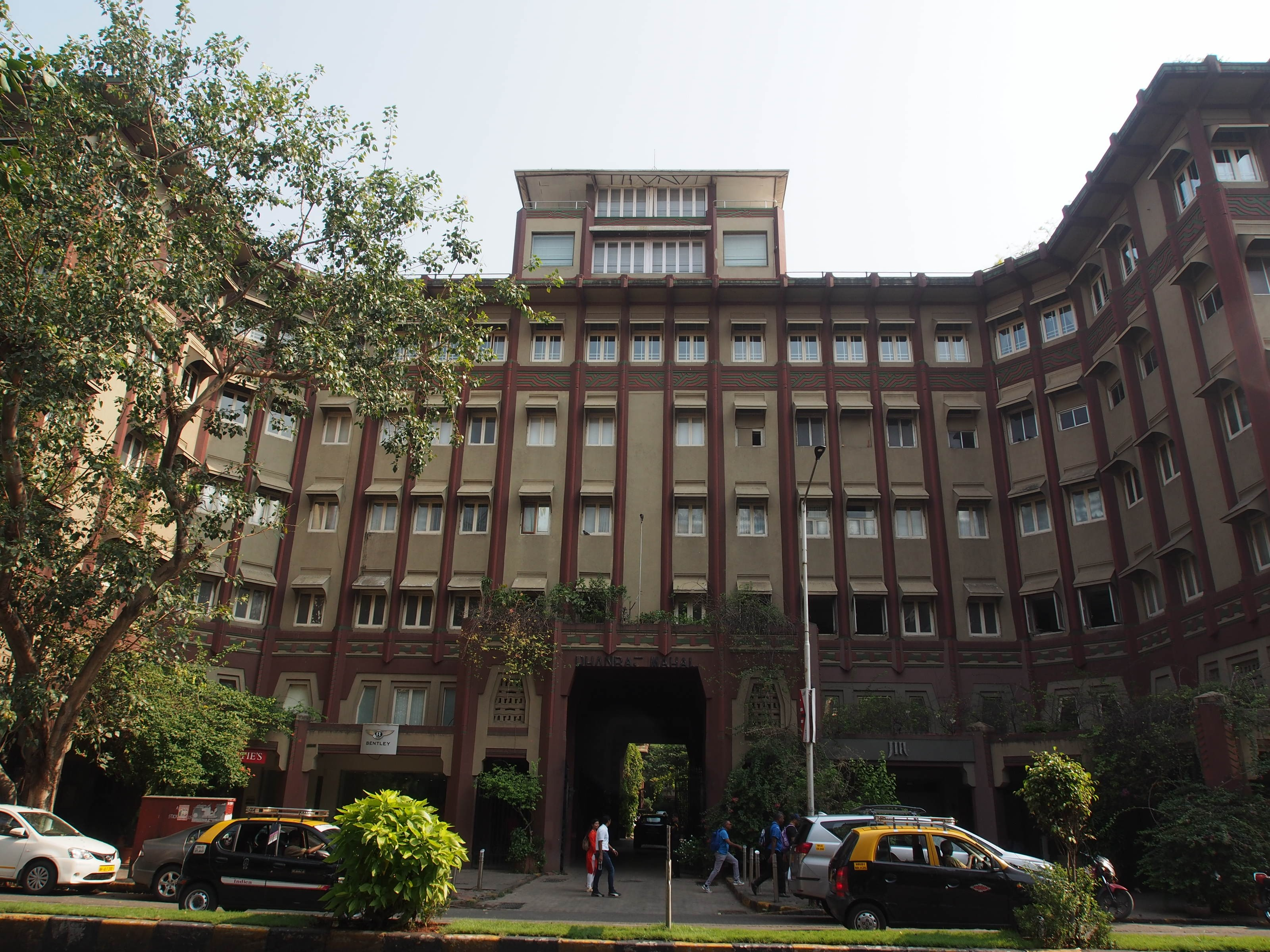
- Façade of Dhanraj Mahal
- Interactive map of the Dhanraj Mahal area
- Former names: Narsingir Mansion

General information
- Type: Residential and Commercial
- Architectural style: Art Deco
- Location: Apollo Bandar, Mumbai, India
- Coordinates: 18.9242°N 72.8336°E

Design and construction
- Architecture firm: Gregson, Batley and King

Other information
- Public transit: Chhatrapati Shivaji Terminus; Churchgate

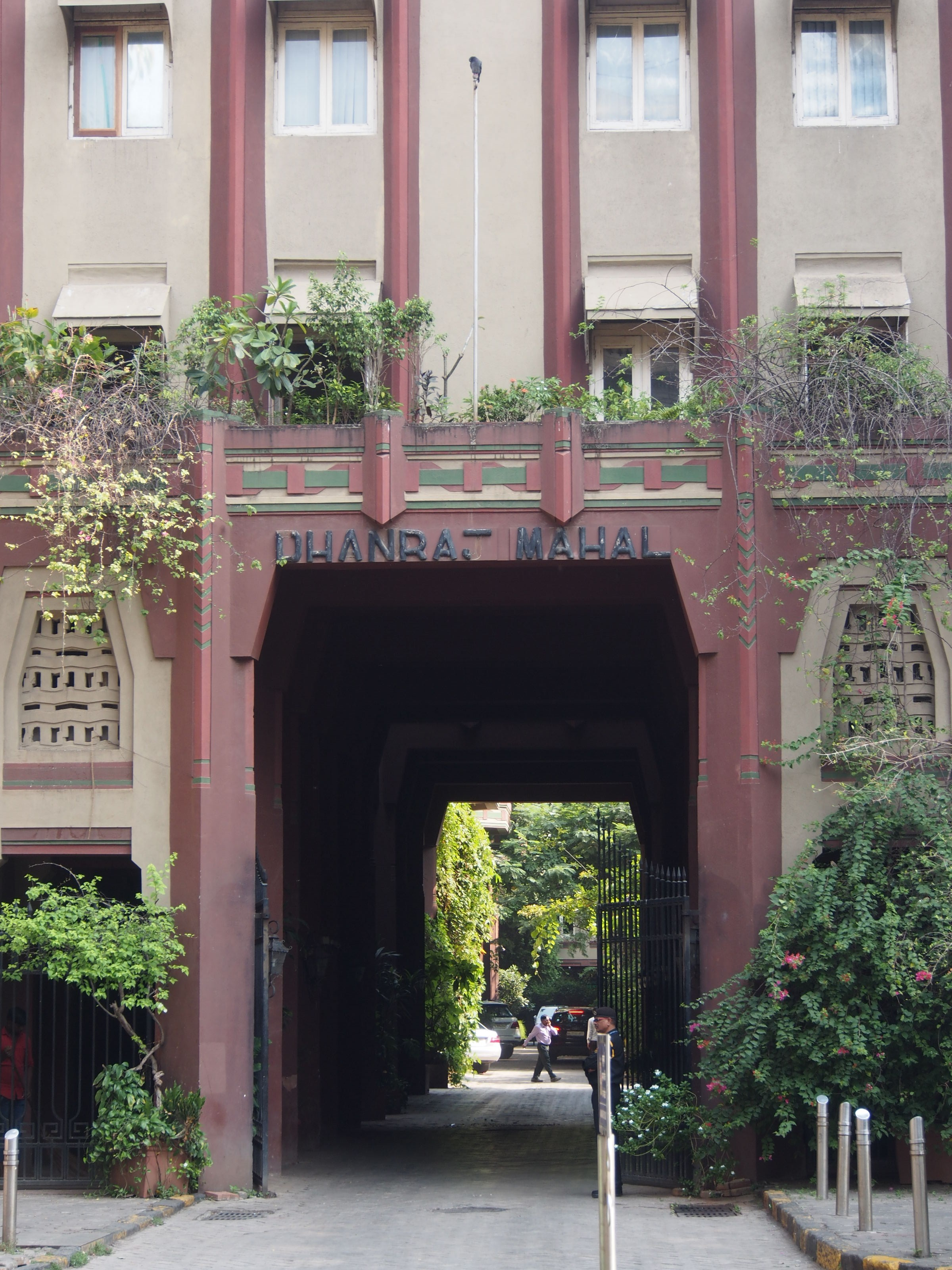
Dhanraj Mahal Entry Gate

The Dhanraj Mahal is a historic Art Deco building located in the Colaba district of Mumbai, India, near the Gateway of India. It was constructed in the mid-1930s as the city palace for Maharaja Narsingir Dhanrajgir Gyan Bahadur of Hyderabad. It was the residence of the actress Zubeida. The princely Dhanrajgir family commissioned the renowned British architectural firm Gregson, Batley & King to design the building. At the time of its completion (1935–1938) it was reportedly the largest and most expensive private residence in Bombay. Dhanraj Mahal’s design draws on early-20th-century Parisian Art Deco. Its façade is clad in a distinctive pale pink sandstone and features sweeping curved forms and geometric ornamentation. The structure has been officially designated a Grade III heritage structure under the Mumbai Municipal Corporation’s conservation regulations.

== History ==
Dhanraj Mahal was built between 1935 and 1938 by Raja Narsingir Dhanrajgir Gyan Bahadur from Hyderabad. The Dhanrajgirs were a wealthy noble family of Hyderabad State who had made their fortune as traders and financiers of the Nizam’s court. Contemporary accounts describe the palace as a symbol of their cosmopolitan taste and wealth. During World War II, the British colonial government requisitioned Dhanraj Mahal for use by the Indian military. After the war the property was returned to the Dhanrajgir family. In the decades following Indian independence (1947), much of the building remained in the family’s hands, although changing economic circumstances led to its conversion into multiple tenancies. By the late 20th century, several portions of Dhanraj Mahal had been leased to commercial enterprises or subdivided into apartments. For example, the first-floor wing was leased as an educational centre in the early 2000s, a tenancy that later led to a publicized legal dispute. Despite these changes, the Dhanrajgir family retained significant ownership. The building’s historical and architectural importance has been recognized by the city. It is classified as a Grade III heritage structure by the Mumbai Municipal Corporation, which means it is legally protected and must be conserved.

In early 2010s, a branch of the Belgian café chain Le Pain Quotidien opened in Dhanraj Mahal, taking advantage of the building’s spacious lobby area and original façade elements. In 2018 a luxury fitness operator, Soleus by Neville Wadia opened a studio within the palace, converting part of the structure’s upper floors into a gym and Pilates studio.

== Architecture ==
The Dhanraj Mahal is an Art Deco style building, adapted for the tropical climate of Mumbai. The building’s massing is arranged around a large central open-air courtyard, with a grand multi-storey entrance and colonnaded balconies on each floor. Its walls are faced with a distinctive pink Jodhpur sandstone, and the design includes long horizontal bands and stylized ornamental panels typical of 1930s Deco. According to architectural commentators, it "displays early 20th-century Parisian design style in a distinctive pink stone". Interior spaces were originally spacious and elegantly detailed, the main staircase and lounges featured streamlined plaster moldings and decorative metalwork consistent with Art Deco motifs. Many of these original features remain visible today, although some rooms have been subdivided for offices or flats. The facade incorporates decorative concrete "scrim" screens on either side of the entrance, with a geometric grillwork that filters light and air. The overall impression is one of the high-style Indo-Deco that was popular among Bombay’s elite in the 1930s.

== Notable residents ==
The primary occupants of Dhanraj Mahal have always been the Dhanrajgir family themselves. Maharaja Narsingir Dhanrajgir and his wife, the celebrated early Indian film actress Zubeida (1911–1988), lived in the palace after their marriage in 1949. Zubeida, star of India’s first talkie Alam Ara (1931), spent her later years at Dhanraj Mahal, which was then known as the family’s Bombay palace. Their children and descendants also resided here, Zubeida’s son, Humayun Dhanrajgir, later became a prominent industrialist and lived in part of the mansion. Into the present day, some apartments in Dhanraj Mahal remain occupied by members of the Dhanrajgir lineage. Outside tenants have also lived or worked in the building, for instance, the educational institute mentioned above occupied a large first-floor suite (approximately 2,700 sq ft) starting in 2002, before eventually vacating in 2010.
