= Prithvi Vallabh (1924 film) =

- Directed by: Manilal Joshi
- Written by: K. M. Munshi, D. S. Shirur
- Starring: P. Y. Altekar; Wagle Sandow; Fatma Begum; Zubeida; Sultana; Bhalji Pendharkar
- Cinematography: V. B. Joshi
- Edited by: R. G. Torne
- Production company: Ashoka Pictures
- Release date: 1924
- Country: India
- Language: Silent film

Prithvi Vallabh (English: The Lord of Love and Power) was a 1924 Indian historical drama film directed by Manilal Joshi. It was based on the 1921 Gujarati novel Prithivivallabh by K. M. Munshi.

== Plot ==
Munj, the king of Avanti who is a great warrior and patron of arts, is captured by his opponent Tailap with help from Bhillam, king of Dharavati. Tailap orders an execution of Munj but is stopped by Mrinalvati, Tailap's sister, who wants to break Munj's spirit. But she fall in love with Munj and they decide to escape together. When Tailap come to know about the plan, he has Munj executed by elephants.

== Cast ==
Cast is as follows:

- P. Y. Altekar as Bhillam
- Wagle Sandow as Munj
- Fatma Begum as Mrinalvati, Tailap's sister
- Zubeida as Vilasvati
- Sultana as Jakkala Devi
- Miss Jaina
- Bhalji Pendharkar

== Production ==
The script was written by D. S. Shirur based on the 1921 Gujarati novel Prithivivallabh by K. M. Munshi which was serialised in Vismi Sadi, a Gujarati journal. The film was directed by Manilal Joshi while shot by V. B. Joshi. The film reel was 7456 feet long. It was in black and white and silent.

It was the first and major film produced by the Ashoka Pictures. It was shot mainly around the Makarpura Palace in Vadodara and the sets were designed by R. S. Choudhury. The climax featured the elephant stampede which had created a sensation then. It is notable for costumes too.

== Release ==
The film was released on 19 July 1924 at the Majestic Cinema in Bombay.

== Remake ==
The film was remade in 1943 Hindi film Prithvi Vallabh directed by Sohrab Modi.
