= Sultana (actress) =

One of the earliest film actresses from India (1910–1990)

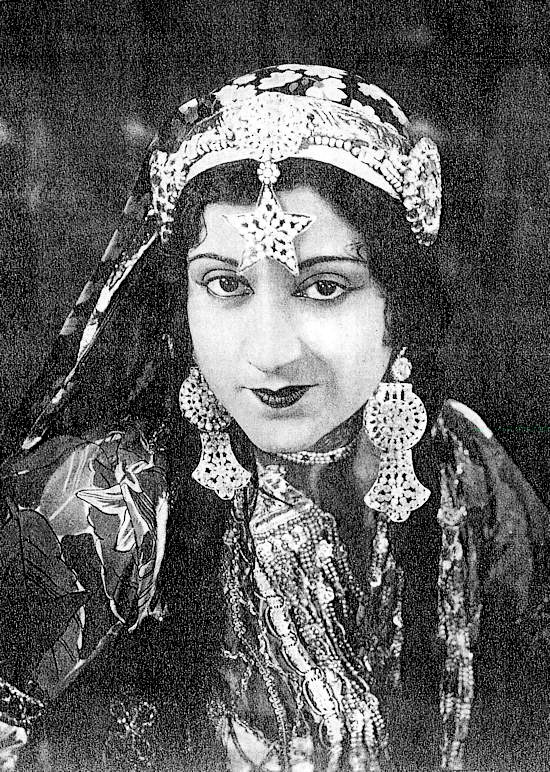
- Sultana Begum
- Born: Sultana Begum; 10 February 1910; Surat, Bombay Presidency, British India
- Died: 19 September 1990 (aged 80); Karachi, Sindh, Pakistan
- Occupations: Actress; Producer
- Years active: 1922 – 1962
- Spouse: Seth Razzaq (husband)
- Children: Jamila Razzaq (daughter)
- Parent(s): Fatma Begum (mother); Nawab Sidi Ibrahim Muhammad Yakut Khan III (father)
- Relatives: Waqar Hasan (son-in-law); Zubeida (sister); Rhea Pillai (great-niece)

Sultana (10 February 1910 - 19 September 1990), also known as Sultana Razzaq, was one of the earliest film actresses from India who acted both in silent films and later in sound films. She was one of the most popular actress during 1920s, 1930s and 1940s in Indian Cinema in both silent films and later in the talkies. She was the daughter of India's first female film director, Fatma Begum. She was the elder sister of Zubeida a leading actress of India's first talkie film Alam Ara in 1931.

== Early life ==
Born in 1910 at Surat city of Gujarat in western British India, Sultana was the daughter of Nawab Sidi Ibrahim Muhammad Yakut Khan III of Sachin State and Fatma Begum. She had two sisters, Zubeida and Shehzadi, both actresses. She was among the few girls who entered films at a tender age during a time when it was not considered an appropriate profession for girls from respectable families.

== Career ==
Sultana was a popular actress in the silent movie era, usually cast in romantic roles. She started her career as actress in film Veer Abhimanyu (1922) and later performed in several silent films. Later, she also acted in talkie movies. When India was partitioned in 1947, she migrated to Pakistan with her husband, a wealthy man named Seth Razzaq. Her daughter, Jamila Razzaq, also became an actress with her encouragement. She produced a film in Pakistan, named Hum Ek Hain (1961), written by famous scriptwriter, Fayyaz Hashmi. The film was partly shot in colour, which was rare those days, but it failed miserably and Sultana stopped producing any films afterwards but later the film became popular among the audience the film received critical acclaim for its script and performances. Its reputation has shifted over the following years, and many critics now consider the film to be a masterpiece and one of the best films of the 1960s.

She continued to remain active and worked as a producer in some films and then as her daughter's dress-designer when Jamila started working in films.

== Personal life ==
She married businessman Seth Razzaq and together they had a daughter named Jamila, a popular actress during 1950s and 1960s in the cinema of Pakistan. Jamila married the well known Pakistani cricketer Waqar Hasan, who is the brother of filmmaker Iqbal Shehzad. He runs a business under the name National Foods at Karachi.

== Death ==
Sultana died in 1990 at her family's home in Karachi, Pakistan and was laid to rest in a Karachi graveyard.

== Filmography ==
=== Silent Movies ===
Year	Title	Producer	Role	Notes
1922	Veer Abhimaniyu	Star Films	Uttari	Debut Movie
1924	Gul Bakavali	Kohinoor & Imperial		
1924	Kalyan Khajina	Kohinoor & Imperial	A Fair Maiden	
1924	Kala Naag	Kohinoor & Imperial		
1924	Manorama	Kohinoor & Imperial		
1924	Prithvi Vallabh	Ashoka Pictures	Jakkala Devi	
1924	Sati Sardarba	Saraswati Film Company		
1925	Indra Sabha	Kohinoor & Imperial		
1926	Bulbul-e-Paristan	Fatma Films Company		
1927	Balidan	Orient Pictures Corporation		
1928	Chandravali	Victoria Fatima Film Company		
1929	Kanak Tara	Fatima Film Company		
1929	Young India	Indulal Yagnik		
1930	Brand Of Fate	Imperial Film Company		
1930	Glory Of India	Ranjit Film Company		
1930	Revence	Imperial Film Company		
1930	The Comet	Surya F. Co.		
1931	Wages of Sin	Sharda Mysore Pictures Corporation		

=== Talkie Movies ===
Year	Title	Producer	Role	Notes
1931	Milkmaid	Ranjit Film Company		First Indian Talkie Movie of Sultana
1931	Kamar-Al-Zaman	Imperial Film Company	Maimoonah	
1932	Balwant Bhatt	Balwant Bhatt		
1933	Intekam	Amar Mullick		
1933	Shan-e-Subhan	Brahma Film Company		
1934	Afghan Abla	Kumar M.		
1934	Amirzadi	Kumar M.		
1934	Saubhagya Laxmi	Kumar M.		
1935	Behan Ka Prem	Prosperity Films		
1935	Bidrohee	East India Film Company		
1935	Kamroo Desh Ki Kamini	Kumar M.		
1935	Maut Ka Toofan	All India Movie		
1935	Step Mother	East India Film Company		
1936	Hoor-E-Samundar	Vishnu Cine		
1936	Sagar Ki Kanya	Vijay Pictures		
1936	Devdas	Pramathesh Barua	Parvati	
1938	Talwar Ka Dhani			
1939	Indramalati			
1940	Usha Haran	Popular Pictures		
1949	Girdhar Gopal Ki Mira			

=== Producer ===
Year	Title	Notes
1961	Hum Ek Hain	Pakistani Movie
