= Sidi Muhammad Haider Khan =

Nawab of Sachin (1930 - 1970)

Muhammad Haider Khan
- Mubariz-ud-Daula; Muzaffar-ul-Mulk; Nusrat Jang

Nawab of Sachin
- Reign: 19 November 1930 – 13 May 1970
- Predecessor: Ibrahim Muhammad Yakut Khan III
- Successor: Muhammad Suroor Yakut Khan
- Born: 11 September 1909
- Died: 31 May 1970 (aged 60)
- Wives: Nusrat Zamani Begum (m. 1930); Yakut Zamani Begum (m. 1937); Massarat Zamani Begum (m. 1938)
Names
- Sidi Muhammad Haider Khan
- House: Sachin
- Dynasty: Siddi
- Father: Ibrahim Muhammad Yakut Khan III
- Mother: Fatima Sultan Jahan

Sidi Muhammad Haider Khan also known as was the Nawab of Sachin from 1930 until his death in 1970. He belonged the lineal descendants of the Sidi Habshi or Abbyssinian rulers of Janjira descended from Nawab Bahadur Sidi Abdul Karim Muhammad Yakut Khan I

== Biography ==
He was born on 11 September 1909 as the eldest son of Ibrahim Muhammad Yakut Khan III and his wife Fatima Sultan Jahan. He was initially homeschooled and later completed his formal education at the Rajkumar College, Rajkot.

Upon the death of his father on 19 November 1930, he succeeded him as the Nawab of Sachin. He was invested with ruling powers on 5 February 1931 by the Political Agent on two conditions: firstly, that for a period of two years, his Diwan would be appointed with the approval of the Government; and secondly, that in all important matters of State policy, he would abide by the advice of the Political Agent. He acceded Sachin to the Dominion of India in August 1947.

His summer capital was located in the seaside town of Dumas, on the Western Coast of Gujarat just 10 miles from Surat. It was the only such town on the Western Coast reportedly having well road connectivity with the Grand Trunk Road and also equipped with telephone lines and other communications.

He married three times. His first marriage was to Arjumand Bano Sarkar-i-Aliya Nawab Nusrat Zamani Begum, the eldest sister of the Nawab of Loharu, on 7 July 1930. His second marriage took place on 23 July 1937 to Alimamma Sultan Nur Mahal Nawab Yakut Zamani Begum. His third marriage was on 10 May 1938 to Manzar Sultan Mumtaz Mahal Nawab Massarat Zamani Begum.

He died on 31 May 1970.

== Titles and styles ==
His titles were:

- 11 September 1909 – 19 November 1930: Nawabzada Sidi Muhammad Haider Khan Bahadur, Wali Ahad Sahib of Sachin.
- 19 November 1930 – 31 May 1970: His Highness Mubariz-ud-Daula Muzaffar-ul-Mulk Nawab Sidi Muhammad Haider Khan Bahadur, Nusrat Jang, Nawab Sahib of Sachin.
