= Abdul Karim Muhammad Yakut Khan II =

Nawab of Sachin (1853 - 1868)

Abdul Karim Muhammad Yakut Khan
- Mubariz-ud-Daula; Muzaffar-ul-Mulk; Nusrat Jang

Nawab of Sachin
- Reign: c. 1853 – c. 1868
- Predecessor: Ibrahim Muhammad Yakut Khan I
- Successor: Ibrahim Muhammad Yakut Khan II
- Died: c. 1868
- House: Sachin
- Dynasty: Sidi

Sidi Abdul Karim Muhammad Yakut Khan II was the Nawab of Sachin from 1853 until his death in 1868.

== Biography ==
Upon the death of his father, Ibrahim Muhammad Yakut Khan I, in 1853, he succeeded him as the Nawab of Sachin. Owing to his father's extravagance, the administration of the state of Sachin was transferred to the British Government in 1829. Upon his accession, he continued repaying the debt, and by 1859, when it had fallen to £78,581, the attachment was withdrawn. As the revenue had declined to £7,891, the Government agreed to hand over the entire state to him, on the condition that he pay, each year before 1 June, a sum of £3,500 until the outstanding amount of £54,242 was fully cleared. The East India Company had offered to purchase Dumas and its dependencies to ease the Nawab’s financial condition and to liquidate his father’s debts, but he declined. The Company then offered him an advance of Rs 2.5 lakhs against the villages of Dumas and Bhimpore provided he agreed to transfer these villages to them for a period of 20 years. However, he did not accept the offer. The state was restored to him in 1864.

He died in 1868 and was succeeded by his son Ibrahim Muhammad Yakut Khan II.
