= Ruby Myers =

Indian actress (1907–1983)

Sulochana
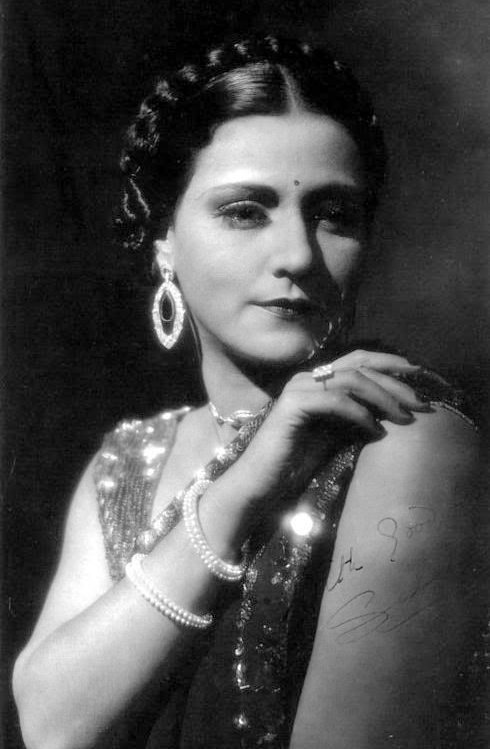
- Sulochana in the 1920s
- Born: Ruby Myers; 1907; Poona, Bombay Presidency, British India
- Died: 10 October 1983 (aged 75–76); Bombay, Maharashtra, India
- Occupation: Actress
- Years active: 1925–1983

Ruby Myers (1907 – 10 October 1983), better known by her stage name Sulochana, was an Indian silent and later Hindi film actress. In her heyday she was one of the highest paid actresses of her time, when she was paired with Dinshaw Billimoria in Imperial Studios films. In the mid-1930s she opened Rubi Pics, a film production house. Myers was awarded the 1973 Dada Saheb Phalke Award, India's highest award in cinema for lifetime achievement.

== Early life ==
Ruby Myers was born in 1907 in Poona, British India into a Baghdadi Jewish family.

== Film career ==
Myers in Indira M.A. (1934)

The self-named Sulochana was among the early female stars of Indian cinema.

She was working as a telephone operator when she was approached by Mohan Bhavnani of Kohinoor Film Company to work in films. She initially turned him down as acting was regarded as quite a dubious profession for women those days. However Bhavnani persisted and she finally agreed, despite having no knowledge of acting. She became a star under Bhavnani's direction at Kohinoor before moving on to the Imperial Film Company where she became the highest paid movie star in the country.

Among her popular films were Typist Girl (1926), Balidaan (1927) and Wildcat of Bombay (1927).

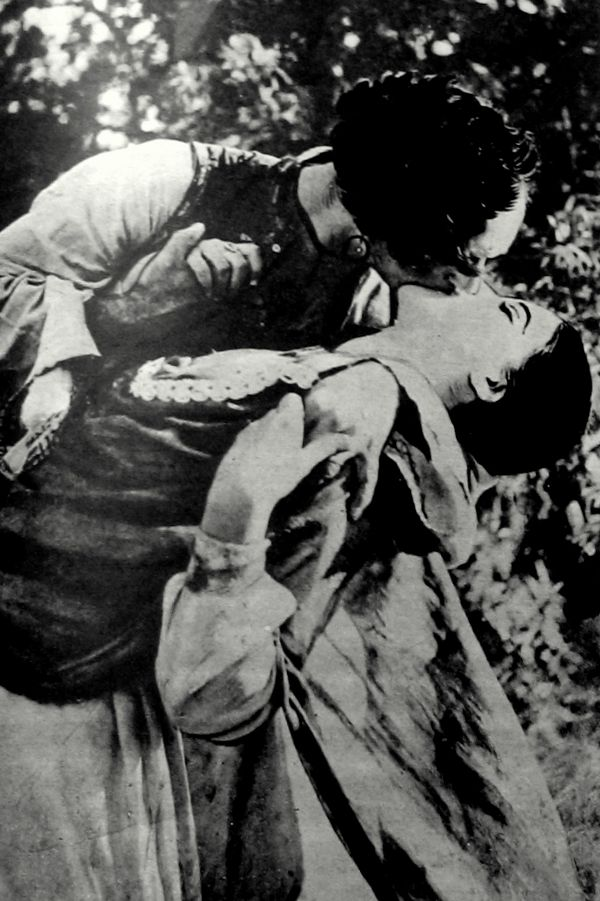
Sulochana with D. Billimoria in Heer Ranjah (1929)

Three romantic films in 1928-29 with director R.S. Chaudhari - Madhuri (1928), Anarkali (1928) and Indira B.A. (1929) saw her at her peak of fame in the silent film era. When a short film on Mahatma Gandhi inaugurating a khadi exhibition was shown, alongside it was added a popular dance of Sulochana's from Madhuri, synchronised with sound effects.

With the coming of sound, Sulochana found a lull in her career, as it now required an actor to be proficient in Hindustani. Taking a year off to learn the language, she made a comeback with the talkie version of Madhuri (1932).

Further talkie versions of her silent hits followed, with Indira [now an] M.A. (1934), Anarkali (1935) and Bombay Ki Billi (1936). Sulochana was back with a bang. She was drawing a salary of Rs. 5000 per month, she had the sleekest of cars (Chevrolet 1935) and one of the biggest heroes of the silent era, D. Billimoria, as her lover with whom she worked exclusively between 1933 and 1939. They were an extremely popular pair - his John Barrymore-style opposite her Oriental 'Queen of Romance'. But once their love story ended so did their careers. Sulochana left Imperial to find few offers forthcoming. She tried making a comeback with character roles but even these were few. Sulochana established her own film studio, Rubi Pics, in the mid-1930s.

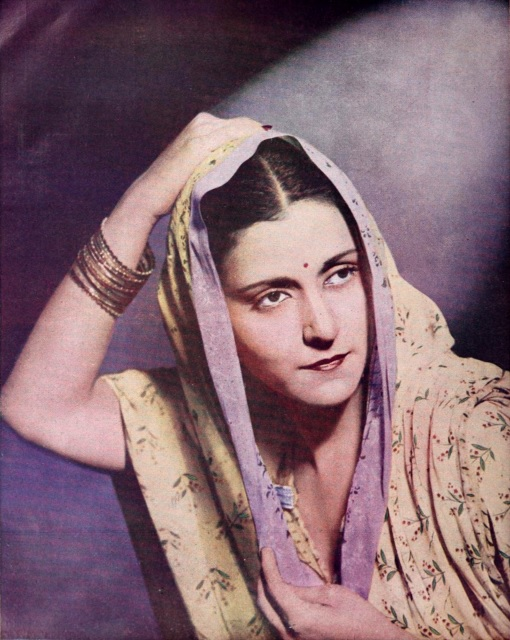
Sulochana in a publicity still from Prem Ki Jyot (1939)

In 1947, Morarji Desai banned Jugnu, because it showed the "morally reprehensible" act of an aging fellow professor falling for Sulochana's vintage charms. In 1953, she acted in her third Anarkali, but this time in a supporting role as Salim's mother.

== Later life and death ==
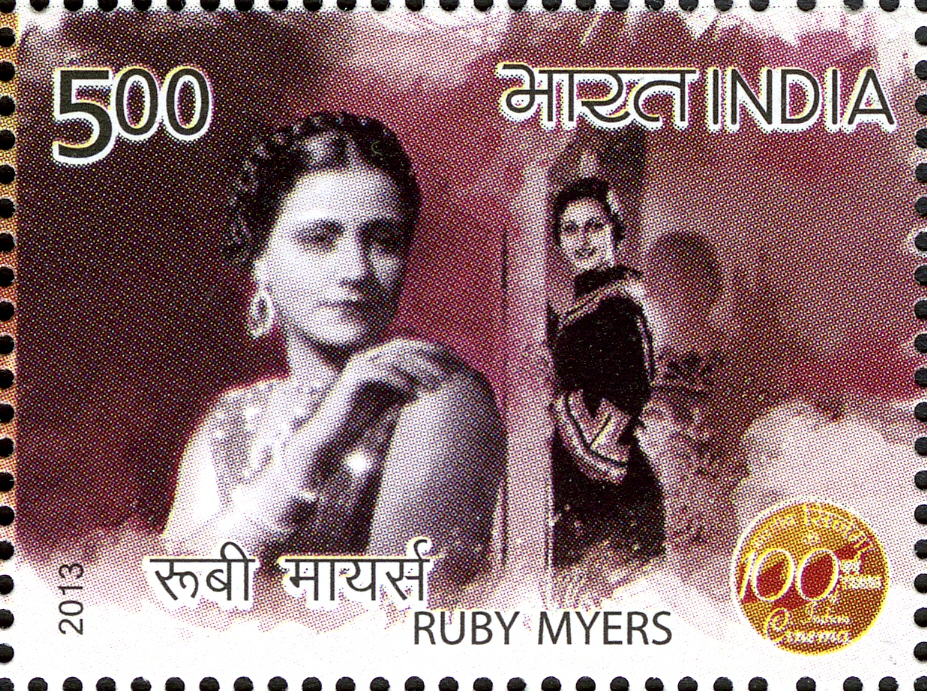
Ruby Myers in 2013 stamp of India

She received the Dada Saheb Phalke Award in 1973 for her lifetime contribution to Indian cinema. Ismail Merchant paid homage to her in Mahatma and the Bad Boy (1974). She adopted a girl and named her Sarah Myers who after marriage was called Vijaylaxmi Shreshtha. Myers died in her flat Mumbai in 1983.

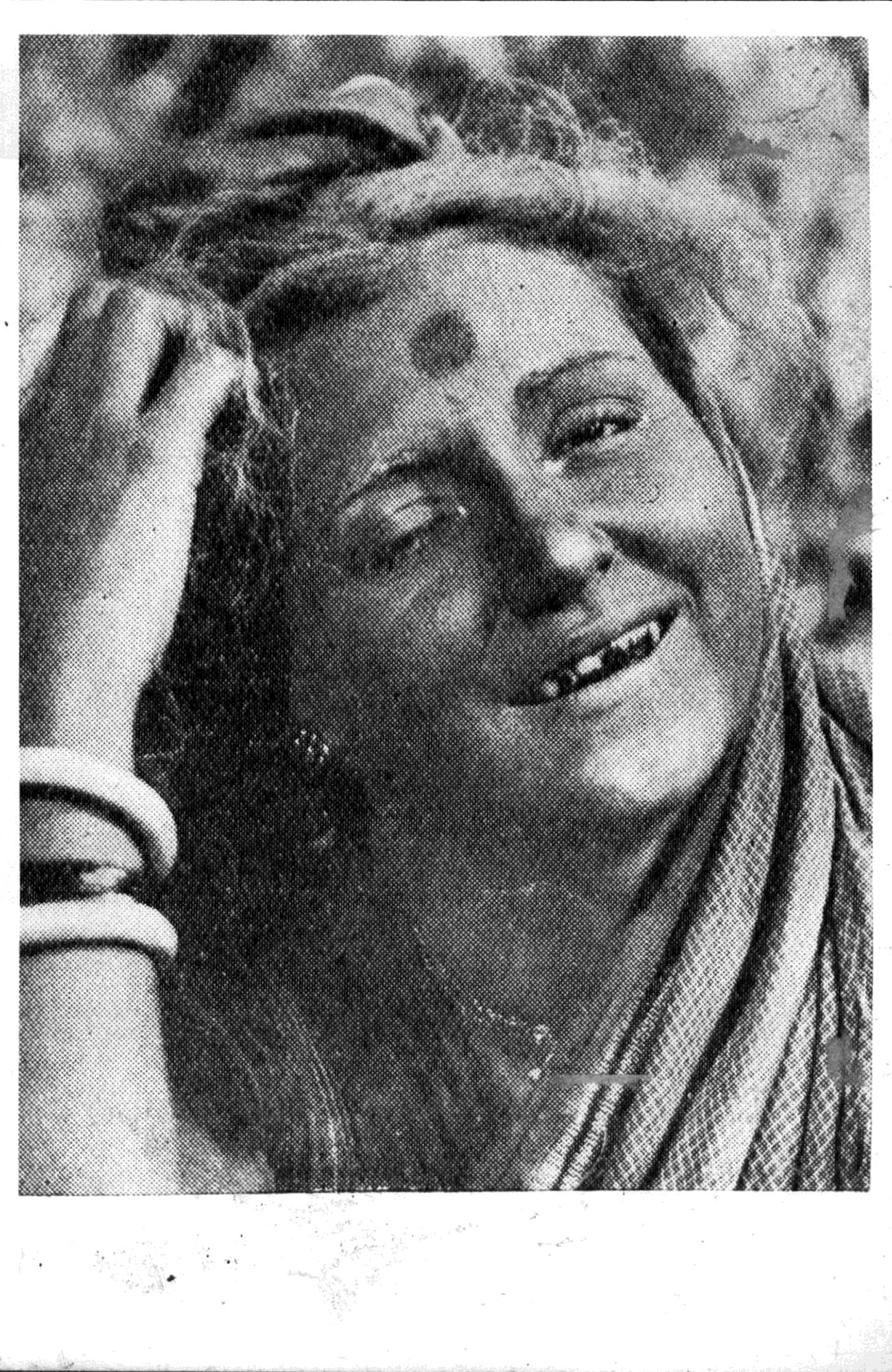
Still from the Wildcat of Bombay (1927)

== Selected filmography ==
Her films include Cinema Queen (1926), Typist Girl (1926), Balidaan (1927), Wildcat of Bombay (1927) in which she played eight different characters, which was remade as Bombay Ki Billi (1936); Madhuri (1928), which was re-released with sound in 1932; Anarkali (1928), remade in 1945; Indira B.A (1929); Heer Ranjah (1929), and many others, such as Baaz (1953).

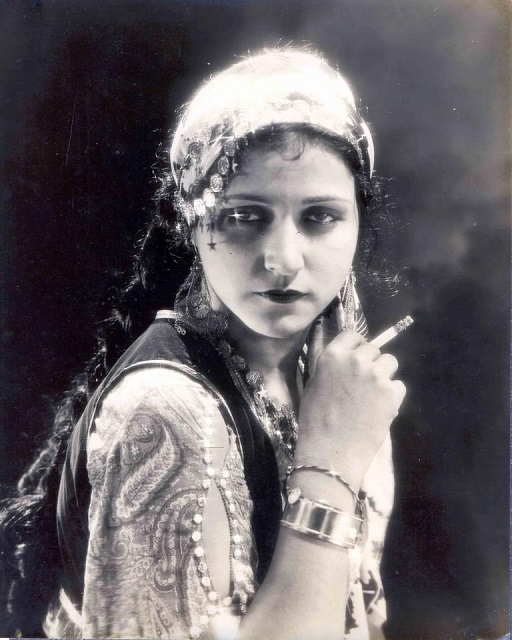
In Daku Ki Ladki (1933)

- Cinema Queen (1926)
- Typist Girl (1926)
- Balidan (1927)
- Wildcat of Bombay (1927)
- Anarkali (1928)
- Heer Ranjah (1929)
- Indira BA (1929)
- Noor-E-Alam / Queen of Love (1931)
- Daku Ki Ladki (1933)
- Saubhagya Sundari (1933)
- Sulochana (1933)
- Gul Sanobar (1934)
- Indira M.A (1934)
- Prem Ki Jyot (1939)
- Shair (1949)
- The Jungle (1952)
- Baaz (1953)
- Kadu Makrani (1960, Gujarati)
- Amrapali (1966)
- Neel Kamal (1968)
- Mere Humdum Mere Dost (1968)
- Julie (1975)
- Khatta Meetha (1978)

== See also ==
- List of Indian film actresses
- List of Indian Jews
