= Zubeida =

Indian actress (1911–1988)

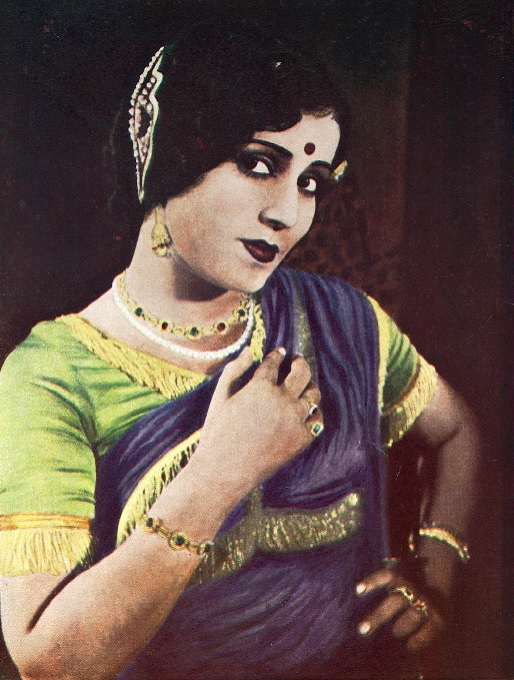
- Zubeida in Seva Sadan (1934)
- Born: Zubeida Begum; 1911; Surat, Bombay Presidency, British India
- Died: 21 September 1988 (aged 76–77); Bombay, Maharashtra, India
- Occupation: Actress
- Years active: 1922–1953
- Spouse: Maharaj Narsingir Dhanrajgir Gyan Bahadur
- Children: 2
- Parent(s): Fatma Begum (mother); Sidi Ibrahim Muhammad Yakut Khan III (father)
- Relatives: Sultana (sister); Rhea Pillai (granddaughter); Jamila Razzaq (niece)

Zubeida Begum Dhanrajgir (1911 – 21 September 1988) was an Indian actress. Early in her career, she starred in a number of silent films, which were followed by a breakthrough in the first Indian talkie Alam Ara (1931). Her other notable works include Sagar Movietone's Meri Jaan (1931) and Devdas (1937).

== Early life ==
Born in 1911 in Surat city of Gujarat in western India, Zubeida was the daughter of Nawab Sidi Ibrahim Muhammad Yakut Khan III of Sachin State and Fatma Begum. She had two sisters, Sultana and Shehzadi, both actresses. She was among the few girls who entered films as a teenager during a time when it was not considered a honourable profession for girls from respectable families.

== Career ==
Zubeida was only 12 when she made her debut in Kohinoor, which was a silent film at the time. Through the 1920s she made infrequent appearances on screen along with Sultana who, by then, had become one of Indian cinema's loveliest and popular leading ladies. One of the films to star the two sisters was Kalyan Khajina in 1924. They had also shared the screen in Zubeida's first blockbuster, Veer Abhimanyu released two years earlier in 1922, that also had their mother, Fatma Begum, playing an important role.

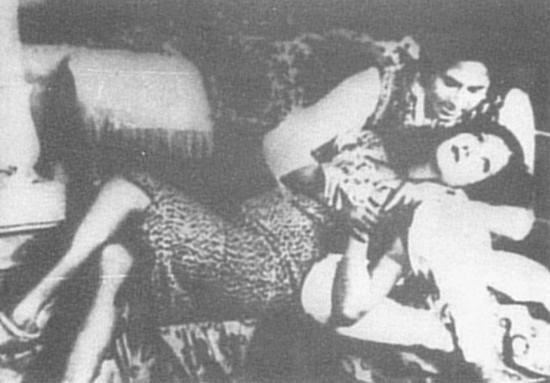
Zubeida with Master Vithal, in Alam Ara (1931)

In 1925, Zubeida had nine releases, amongst them Kala Chor, Devdasi and Desh Ka Dushman. A year later she starred in her mother's film, Bulbul-e-Paristan. In 1927, she acted in Laila Majnu, Nanand Bhojai and Naval Gandhi's Sacrifice which were very successful movies at the time. The latter, based on Rabindranath Tagore's 'Balidan', also starred Sulochana Devi, Master Vithal and Jal Khambatta. It condemned the age-old custom of animal sacrifice in certain Kali temples in Bengal, India. Members of the Indian Cinematograph Committee were wowed by this "excellent and truly Indian film". Its European members recommended that it be sent abroad for screening. She also worked in many silent films.

Zubeida starred in a string of silent films before Alam Ara proved to be the turning point in her career and was her biggest hit. She suddenly was highly in demand and got wages high above the standards for a woman in the film industry at that time.

Through the '30s and early '40s she made a hit team with Jal Merchant and starred in several successful historical epic films playing characters like Subhadra, Uttara and Draupadi. She was also successful in portraying emotions with films such as Ezra Mir's Zarina, and Shatir which had her playing a vibrant, volatile circus girl whose kisses scorched the screen and sparked heated debates on censorship. Zubeida was one of the few actresses to make a successful transition from the silent era to the talkies and natak.

In 1934 she set up Mahalakshmi Movietone with Nanubhai Vakil and had box-office bonanzas in Gul-e-Sonobar and Rasik-e-Laila. She continued to appear in one or two films a year from 1949 to 1953. Nirdosh Abla was her last film.

== Personal life ==
Born in a Muslim family, Zubeida converted to Hinduism to marry Maharaj Narsingir Dhanrajgir Gyan Bahadur of Hyderabad. Their son was Humayun Dhanrajgir (died 2024), the former managing director of GlaxoSmithKline Pharmaceuticals, while their daughter was Dur-e-shahwar Dhanrajgir. Their grand children include model Rhea Pillai, and Nikhil and Ashok Dhanrajgir (Humayun's sons).

== Death ==
Zubeida spent her last years at the family's Bombay palace in 1987, Dhanraj Mahal. She died on 21 September 1988, aged 76 or 77, in Bombay and was laid to rest at Chhatrapathi Shivaji Maharaj Marg, Apollo Bunder, Colaba, south Mumbai.

== Filmography ==
- Gul-e-Bakavali (1924)
- Manorama (1924)
- Prithvi Vallabh (1924)
- Sati Sardarba (1924)
- Ram Sarovar (1924)
- Kala Chor (1925)
- Devadasi (1925)
- Indrasabha (1925)
- Ra Navghan (1925)
- Rambha of Rajnagar (1925)
- Deshna Dushman (1925)
- Yashodevi (1925)
- Khandani Khavis (1925)
- Sati Simantini (1925)
- Bulbule Paristan (1926)
- Kashmeera (1926)
- Raja Bhoj (1926)
- Gulezaar (1926)
- Indrajal (1926)
- Sati Menadevi (1926)
- Laila Majnu (1927)
- Nanand Bhojai (1927)
- Balidan (1927)
- Chamakti Chanda (1928)
- Samrat Ashok (1928)
- Golden Gang (1928)
- Heer Ranjha (1928)
- Kanakatara (1929)
- Mahasundar (1929)
- Milan Dinar (1929)
- Shahi Chor (1929)
- Jai Bharati (1929)
- Devadasi (1930)
- Garva Khandan (1930)
- Joban Na Jadu (1930)
- Veer Rajput (1930)
- Sinh No Panja (1930)
- Meethi Churi (1931)
- Diwani Duniya (1931)
- Roop Sundari (1931)
- Hoor-E-Misar (1931)
- Karmano Kaher (1931)
- Nadira (1931)
- Alam Ara (1931)
- Meri Jaan (1931)
- Veer Abhimanyu (1931)
- Meerabai (1932)
- Subhadra Haran (1932)
- Zarina (1932)
- Harijan (1933)
- Bulbule Punjab (1933)
- Pandav Kaurav (1933)
- Mahabharat (1933)
- Gul Sanobar (1934)
- Nanand Bhojai (1934)
- Radha Mohan/Nand Ke Lala (1934)
- Rasik-e-Laila (1934)
- Seva Sadan (1934)
- Birbal Ki Beti (1935)
- Gulshane Alam (1935)
- Mr. and Mrs. Bombay (1936)
- Aurat Ki Zindagi (1937)
- Kiski Pyari (1937)
- Devdas (1937)
- Nirdosh Abla (1949)
- Awāra (1951): Young Rita
