= Lajpor =

Lajpur
- Neighbourhood
- Interactive map of Lajpur
- Coordinates: 21°3′40″N 72°54′0″E
- Country: India
- State: Gujarat
- District: Surat
- Established: more than300 years

Government
  - Body: Surat Municipal Corporation

Languages
  - Official: Gujarati, Hindi
- Time zone: UTC+5:30 (IST)
- PIN: 394235
- Telephone code: 91261-XXX-XXXX
- Vehicle registration: GJ5xxxxx
- Lok Sabha constituency: Surat
- Civic agency: Surat Municipal Corporation
- Website: gujaratindia.com lajpur.com

Lajpur is biggest village in Choryasi Taluka of Surat District located 20 km South of Surat on Surat-Navsari road Surat, India.

== Notable people ==
Mufti Sayyed Abur Rahim Lajpuri

== See also ==
- List of tourist attractions in Surat
