= Fatma Begum =

Indian actress and director (1892–1983)

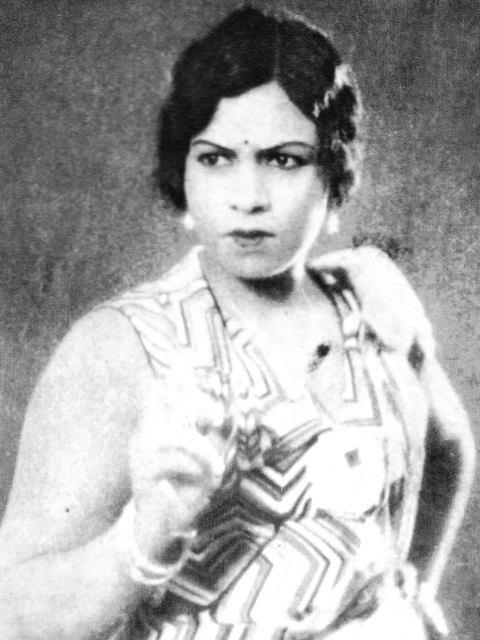
- Born: Fatma Bai; 1892; Gujarat, Surat district, British Raj, British India
- Died: 1983 (aged 90–91); Gujarat, India
- Other name: First Female Film Director of Indian Cinema
- Occupations: Actress; director; screenwriter; producer
- Years active: 1922–1940
- Spouse: Nawab Sidi Ibrahim Muhammad Yakut Khan III (divorced)
- Children: 3, including Zubeida and Sultana
- Relatives: Jamila Razzaq (granddaughter); Rhea Pillai (great-granddaughter)

Fatma Begum (1892 – 1983) was an Indian actress, director, producer and screenwriter. She is known as The First Female Film Director in Indian Cinema.

Within four years, she went on to write, produce and direct many films. She launched her own production house, Fatma Films, which later became Victoria-Fatma Films, and directed her first film, Bulbul-e-Paristan, in 1926.

== Early life ==
Fatma Begum was born into an Urdu-speaking Muslim family in India and came from a background in the Urdu language theater, her family of Muslim background having spoken that tongue. She was trained in theater and mostly acted in Urdu and Hindi plays.

== Career ==
She began her career on the Urdu stage. She later shifted to films and debuted in Ardeshir Irani's silent film, Veer Abhimanyu (1922). It was common practice for men to play women in plays and movies, so she became a huge woman superstar. Fatma Begum was fair skinned and wore dark make-up that suited the sepia/black & white images on the screen. Most of the roles required wigs for the heroes as well as the heroines.

In 1926, she established Fatma Films which later became known as Victoria-Fatima Films in 1928. She became a pioneer for fantasy cinema where she used trick photography to have early special effects. She was an actress at Kohinoor Studios and Imperial Studios, while writing, directing, producing, and acting in her own films at Fatma Films.

Begum became the first female director of Indian cinema with her 1926 film, Bulbul-e-Paristan. The film was a high budget production has been described as a fantasy film featuring many special effects and her daughters Sultana, Zubeida also Shehzadi worked in the film. The film places Begum among early pioneers of fantasy cinema such as George Melies. She directed many other films, her last being the Goddess of Luck in 1929. While continuing to produce and appear in her own work, Fatma worked for Kohinoor Studios and Imperial Studios in the film Duniya Kya Hai? in 1937.

She worked in her last film Diamond Queen as Faima in 1940.

== Personal life ==
She was married to Nawab Sidi Ibrahim Muhammad Yakut Khan III of Sachin State. Her husband didn't approve of her acting career, as it was not then considered an appropriate profession for girls from respectable families. In response, she divorced him and took custody of her daughter. She was the mother of silent superstars Zubeida, Sultana and Shahzadi. She was also the grandmother of Humayun Dhanrajgir and Durreshahwar Dhanrajgir, son and daughter of Zubeida and Maharaja Narsingir Dhanrajgir of Hyderabad and Jamila Razzaq daughter of Sultana and Seth Razaaq, a prominent businessman of Karachi. She also happened to be the great-grandmother of model turned actress Rhea Pillai who is the daughter of her grand daughter Durreshahwar Dhanrajgir.

== Death ==
She died in 1983 at the age of 91.

== Filmography ==
=== Silent Movies ===
Year	Film	Role	Notes
1922	Veer Abhimanyu	Subhadra	Debuted in Ardeshir Irani's silent film
1924	Prithvi Vallabh	Mrinalwati	Silent film
1924	Kala Naag		Silent film
1924	Sati Sardarba		Silent film
1924	Gul-e-Bakavali		Silent film
1924	Raja Harishchandra		Silent film
1925	Social Pirates	Mohini	Silent film
1925	Nahar Singh		Silent film
1925	Gaud Bangal		Silent film
1925	Devdasi		Based on Novel
1925	Naharsingh Daku		Silent film
1925	The Magician of Bengal		Silent film
1926	Indrajal		Silent film
1926	Khubsurat Bala	Actress	Silent film
1926	Bulbul-e-Paristan	Actress	First female director of Indian cinema
1926	Swarga Kankan		Silent film
1927	Mumbai Ni Biladi		Silent film
1927	Kul Dipak		Silent film
1928	Rup Basant		Silent film
1929	Maha Sunder		Silent film
1929	Mahasundar		Silent film
1929	Nasib Ni Devi		Silent film
1930	Am Rande Der Sahara		Silent film
1930	Zalim Zulekha	Zulekha	Silent film

=== Talkie Movies ===
Year	Film	Role	Notes
1931	Discarded Love	Actress	
1933	Satan's Victim	Actress	
1934	Seva Sadan	Actress	
1934	Sant Tulsidas	Actress	
1934	Neki Ka Taj	Actress	Starred with Noor Jehan
1938	Duniya Kya Hai?	Actress	
1939	Romancero Marroquí	Actress	
1940	Jai Swadesh	Actress	
1940	Diamond Queen	Faima	

=== Writer ===
Year	Film	Role	Notes
1926	Bulbul-e-Paristan	Writer	Screenplay
1928	Heer Ranjha	Writer	Screenplay
1929	Wonderful Prince	Writer	Screenplay

=== Director ===
Year	Film	Role	Notes
1926	Bulbul-e-Paristan	Director	First female director of Indian cinema; Used own production house 'Fatma Films'
1927	Goddess of Love	Director	
1928	Chandravali	Director	
1928	Heer Ranjha	Director	Director and writer
1929	Goddess of Luck	Director	Director
1929	Kanakatara	Director	
1929	Milan Dinar	Director	
1929	Shakuntala	Director	
1929	Kanak Tara	Director	
1929	Nasib Ni Devi	Director	She also acted in the film

=== Producer ===
Year	Film	Role	Notes
1928	Heer Ranjha	Producer	Producer, director and writer

== Legacy ==
Her legacy was carried on by her daughters Sultana, Shahzadi and Zubeida acted in India's first ever talkie, Alam Ara, in addition to being a silent film star.
