= Indian Cinematograph Committee =

The Indian Cinematograph Committee was established by British Raj in 1927 to "investigate the adequacy of censorship and the supposedly immoral effect of cinematograph films", and subsequently the Indian Cinematograph Committee Evidence and Report 1927-1928 was published in the following year.

== Background ==
In the 1920s, just as the early twilight of the British Empire was approaching, a slightly familiar battle was fought, in a slightly unusual terrain, Cinema. The American film industry had by the twenties already started to dominate the global film market, with American films eclipsing English films in most parts of the British Empire. In response to a number of demands being made by the British film industry for the setting up of quotas in favour of Empire films in the colonies, and as a result of increasing anxiety about the spread of the new technology of cinema in the colonies, the colonial government put together the Indian Cinematograph Committee (“ICC”) to enquire into the working of cinema and censorship in India. The report, and the evidence of the ICC was compiled into five volumes, and contains many oral and written testimonies. However, these documents have been ignored in most debates on film censorship.

At the British Imperial conference held in England in 1926, a number of the delegates raised questions about the adequacy of film censorship to deal with the problems posed by the exhibition of American films. They were, in part, responding to the complaints registered by the Federation of British Industries to the board of trade about what they considered to be a virtual monopoly enjoyed by American films within the empire. This trade organization had represented their case not merely as a matter of protecting British business interests, but also because American films were "detrimental to British prestige and prejudicial to the interests of the empire, especially in the dominions which contains large colored populations". In connection to these concerns, the imperial conference passed a resolution recommending that appropriate action be taken to combat the dominance of Hollywood's films by encouraging their production within the empire. In a very significant report prior to the ICC, it was advocated that “Great Britain owes a duty to the dominions; the dominions to Great Britain and to each other; and India owes a duty first to herself....The film can as well display the ancient dignity of the Mahabharata as teach the Indian peasant the elements of hygiene and sanitation"

It is important to remember that the nationalist movement which was on the rise, spurred on by a series of events including the formation of the Home Rule League, agitations against the Jalianwala Bagh massacre, etc. helped to create the conditions under which the British empire found itself in a slightly precarious and vulnerable phase, needing ways to retain the symbolic fiction of the might of empire. It is in this context, that claims were made of American films tarnishing the prestige of the Empire by portraying scenes of immorality, vice and violence. More particularly, because of the inability of the native to distinguish between different classes of white people, they tended to think of all of the portrayal as endemic to life in the west, and this degraded the image of white women in the eyes of the lustful native men. This is also a period marked by the uncertainty of the effect of cinema, and according to the British social Hygiene delegation that visited India between 1926-27 (just prior to the setting up of the ICC), cinema was the root cause of a large number of evils in India, They said that “in every province that we visited the evil influence of cinema was cited by educationists and representative citizens as one of the major factors in lowering the standards of sex conduct and thereby tending to increase the dissemination of disease"

An article published in The Westminster Gazette in 1921 was widely circulated amongst the provincial governments, and the article claimed that "one of the reasons for the hardly veiled contempt of the native Indian for us maybe found in the introduction and development of moving pictures in India ...imagine the effect of such films on the oriental mind. Like us, the Indian goes to see the movies, but he is not only impressed by the story of the film, but by the difference in dress, in customs and in morals. He sees our woman in the films in scanty garb. He marvels at our heavy infantile humour - his own is on a higher and more intellectual level; he forms his own opinions of our morals during the mighty unrolled dramas of unfaithful wives and unmoral husbands, our lightly broken promises, our dishonored laws. It is soaking into him all the time, and we cannot be surprised at the outwards expression of this absorption. It is difficult for the Britisher in India to keep up his dignity, and to extol, or to enforce moral laws which the natives sees lightly disregarded by the Britons themselves in the picture palace" Similarly, a 1920 report in Bioscope claimed that the main motivation of these regulations was "the fact that there have been numerous complaints that the films were being imported into India which hold up Europeans to ridicule and lowered the native estimation of the white woman" Similarly, Sir Hasketh Bell, a former colonial governor warned that “The success of our government of subject races depends almost entirely on the degree of respect that we can inspire”

The demands for the establishment of a Committee that would look into the ways in which censorship, and other protective measures that could be taken up to prevent the tarnishing of the might of the empire. The economic context, namely the trade rivalry that the British film industry was engaged through 1920s in a competitive film market, with film producers from the United States was always understated. The argument of the cultural invasion and corrosion by Hollywood, was linked centrally to the attempt by the British film industry to bolster what they saw as their national markets including the colonies. Priya Jaikumar terms this as the “imagined audience” of Empire films, a project of both economic consolidation, as well as cultural hegemony.

The ICC was established by an order of the Home department and it was directed to examine the following issues:

1. to examine the organization and principles of methods of the censorship of Cinematograph films in India 2. to survey the organization of Cinematograph films in the film producing industry in India 3. to consider whether it is desirable that steps should be taken to encourage the exhibition of films produced within the British empire generally and the production and exhibition of Indian films in particular and to make recommendations

The Colonial authorities strategically ensured that there was adequate local representation, and made B.T. Rangachariah, a highly respected lawyer from Madras, the chairman of the Committee. They prepared a meticulous set of questions (which we shall consider in a bit), and sent 4325 copies of the questionnaire to a wide range of people, from the film industry, from government, education officials, various police officials, health officials, members of the censor boards, electricity officials and prominent public personalities including Mahatma Gandhi, Lala Lajpat Rai, Dadasaheb Phalke etc. In other words, the colonial governmental machinery was put into motion to ensure that the study was comprehensive and thorough, covering all parts of the then British India from Lahore to Rangoon to Chennai to Delhi. They received 320 written testimonies and interviewed 353 witnessed, and of course with colonial anthropological precision the witnesses are divided into the communities that they represent (114 Europeans, 239 natives, 157 Hindus, 38 Muslims, 25 Parsis, 16 Burmese, 2 Sikhs, and 1 Christian). This question of the representation of communities is a very significant one, which we shall return to in the end, via Madhava Prasad’s work on the ICC report.

In many ways, the ICC report was the first of its kind anywhere in the world, and certainly the most comprehensive study of the material conditions under which early cinema existed in India. The importance of the study, apart from its historical value in documenting cinema up to and during the twenties in India lies in the fact that this was an attempt by the state apparatus to actually create cinema as an object of colonial knowledge, to understand the way it worked, to classify its audience, to name the publicness of the institution, and finally to attempt to render it intelligible within a log of regulation. Priya Jaikumar states that “Perhaps more than any other event in the 1920s the ICC helped to establish persistent themes in ways that the cinema and its audiences in India have been understood, evaluated, criticized and described ever since” . An estimate of the success of the ICC report in setting the terms of the public and regulatory discourse around cinema is the fact that the definition of the cinematic effect that is relied on in K.A.Abbas’s case relies heavily on the account provided in the ICC report. The ICC report, along with another significant study of the era, Film in National Life also contributed towards the making of institutions like the British Film Institute.

Ironically, in purely instrumental terms, the ICC report could be considered a failure since nothing came out of the recommendations of the study, and it ended up as yet another colonial report (apparently doomed for a nondescript existence in dusty shelves). Priya Jaikumar however argues that “the fact that the ICC interviews and final report ended up on a dusty government shelf might be a testimony to the ICC’s success. Its proposals went against the state’s initial intentions, thus forcing the state to consign the document to its filing system. While the interviews deal with the specific conditions of India’s film industry in the 1920s, they have a larger import that has not been realized in their limited analysis so far. Regulatory documents are an invaluable archival source because they give us insight into the dynamic nature of cultural change and power relations. Instead of limiting ourselves to a study of policy effects, a study of the debates and discourses surrounding policy allows us to reconceptualize it as a process of communication and contest, where representatives of a state and film industry arbitrate over their positions”

Her argument is that in our reading of policy, we cannot treat policy processes as reactive to social context but as an intrinsic part of it, and “thus consider regulatory discourses to be open to the kinds of analysis that postcolonial cultural critics have brought to bear on cinematic narratives and images”. One of the reasons for the instrumental failure of the ICC was the fact that its dual agenda of staging a moral panic around the bodies of white women, to set in place a system that would ensure economic quotas for Empire films etc. just did not work out as planned. This plan was dependent on the construction of an idea of native audiences, and their vulnerability to the new technology of cinema, but the committee constantly encountered an intelligibility problem of another sort while collecting their data. The resistance offered by the nascent film industry in India, the nationalist contempt for the crude contrivance of the colonial state, and an emerging confident claim by the colonial subjects upon the experience of modernity constantly frustrated the official plans of the ICC.

While in one sense the ICC can be seen as yet another component of the colonial logic of governmentality, where it exercised power through a complex mode of rendering it into a process of knowledge by means of data collection, historiography, documentation, certification, and representation. Priya Jaikumar says that “It is tempting to see the ICC interviews as part of a process where an industry was studied with the intention of transforming it into a field of state regulation. However, the attempt to collect information on the Indian film industry was disrupted by an internally discordant state agency and a resistant film industry. My account traces these challenges to the imperial state as a series of fractures between the British Indian state and the Indian film industry. Each disruption resulted in a reformulation of the state’s agenda as the government attempted to reauthorize the state’s role in relation to the Indian film industry on the grounds of morality”

It would however be a terrible mistake, both historically and in terms of its relevance to the present for us to see the ICC report merely in terms of a prohibition. As argued in the introduction, the prohibition model yields little in terms of unraveling the complex dynamics of power. Instead we need to understand the ways in which the ICC set in place a system of regulation, which exists in different register, though inter connected. On the one hand, it looked at the question of the regulation of content, and this is the most straight forward censorship question, where the state determines what can or cannot be seen. This of course depends on a second order justification based on the alleged harm caused by certain images. In the case of the ICC, it was the tarnishing of the prestige of the empire. The content of what could or not be seen is also supplemented by the conditions under which acts of public spectatorship are rendered possible. This is made possible through detailed regulations about the spatial conditions of cinema, safety guidelines, electricity norms to be followed etc. Secondly it sets into place a system of regulating the entire industry itself as a whole, through taxation norms, through reformist agendas and policies to improve cinema etc., and finally through the staging of the pedagogic function of censorship, where censorship is not merely about prohibiting a particular view, but since the native actually does not know how to see, or what to see, censorship is also tied to the task of teaching the natives to see properly. This reformist agenda is described by Ashish Rajadhyaksha as the process of “creating a better cinema and worthy of incarnating the citizen as the filmgoing subject”

The interlinked ideas of regulation, reform and education establishes the normative function of cinema and of censorship, and one of the challenges lies in ways in which we can read them not as they traditionally have been in isolated modes, but in a way that renders them a part of a larger project of mobilizing (to borrow from Saeed Mirza) a certain kind of cinema for a certain kind of state.
