= Sidi Ibrahim Muhammad Yakut Khan III =

Nawab of Sachin (1887 - 1930)

Ibrahim Muhammad Yakut Khan
- Mubariz-ud-Daula; Muzaffar-ul-Mulk; Nusrat Jang

Nawab of Sachin
- Reign: 7 February 1887 – 19 November 1930
- Investiture: 4 May 1907
- Predecessor: Abdul Kadir Khan
- Successor: Muhammad Haider Khan
- Born: Najaf Ali Khan; 23 December 1886
- Died: 19 November 1930 (aged 43)
Names
- Sidi Ibrahim Muhammad Yakut Khan III
- House: Sachin
- Dynasty: Sidi
- Father: Abdul Kadir Khan
- Education: Rajkumar College; Mayo College; Imperial Cadet Corps
- Military career
- Allegiance: United Kingdom
- Branch: British Army
- Service years: 1909–1930
- Rank: See list
- Conflicts: World War I; East African campaign; Battle of Tanga

Major Sidi Ibrahim Muhammad Yakut Khan III (Urdu: ابراہیم محمد یاقوت خان; or Najaf Ali Khan) was the Nawab of Sachin from 1887 until his death in 1930.

== Biography ==
He was born on 23 December 1886 to Abdul Kadir Khan. In January 1887, his father abdicated as the Nawab of Sachin in his favour, and he succeeded him on 7 February 1887. Due to his minority, the affairs of Sachin were placed under the administration of the British Government.

He was brought up in infancy by a European lady Miss Rix. At the age of eleven, he was sent to Rajkumar College in Rajkot, where he remained until 1902, after which he was sent to Mayo College in Ajmer. In 1904, he entered the Imperial Cadet Corps and, after completing his course with a good conduct certificate in 1906, left the institution. Afterward, he became involved in the administration of Sachin to gain a clearer understanding of how the state's affairs were managed. He was invested with full administrative powers on 4 May 1907. On the same day, he was also presented with the key to the state treasury. On 23 June 1909, at the Council Hall, Pune, a sword of honour was presented to him. He was also granted a personal salute of eleven guns which entitled him to the style of His Highness. He attended the Delhi Durbar of 1911. On the occasion, he wore the uniform of the Imperial Cadet Corps and paid homage to George V by laying his sword at his feet, bowing three times with folded hands, and repeated the same ceremony before the Mary. He introduced free primary education in all villages of his state. He was selected by the Viceroy and Governor-General of India for active service during World War I. He accompanied the Indian contingent to France. He served with distinction in the East African Campaign during the war. He was present at the battle of Tanga and was twice mentioned in dispatches for gallantry in action. During the war, he offered two seven-seater touring-body motor vehicles for ambulance work or other purposes. They were equipped with tools, spares, and lamps. He founded the Nishan-i-Sardari and Tamgha-i-Liaqat-i-Khidmat in August 1918.

He died on 19 November 1930 and was succeeded by his son Muhammad Haider Khan.

== Titles, styles, and honours ==
=== Titles and styles ===
During his father’s lifetime, he was styled Nawabzada Wali Ahad Sahib. He was styled His Highness the Nawab of Sachin from the day he succeeded his father and held various titles and honorary military positions throughout his reign.

His full styles and titles were: His Highness Mubariz-ud-Daula Muzaffar-ul-Mulk Nawab Sidi Ibrahim Muhammad Yakut Khan III Bahadur, Nusrat Jang, Nawab of Sachin.

=== Military ranks ===
- (British Raj) 1904: Lieutenant, Imperial Cadet Corps
- (United Kingdom) 1909: Honorary Captain, British Army
- (United Kingdom) 1921 – 1930: Honorary Major, British Army

=== Appointments ===
- 1906 – 1910: Honorary Aide-de-Camp to the Governors of Bombay including Lord Lamington and Lord Sydenham.
