= Katyar Kaljat Ghusali (soundtrack) =

Soundtrack album by Shankar–Ehsaan–Loy and Jitendra Abhisheki
- Released: 16 October 2015
- Genre: Feature film soundtrack
- Length: 56:43
- Language: Marathi
- Label: Zee Music Company

Shankar–Ehsaan–Loy chronology
Katti Batti (2015)	Katyar Kaljat Ghusali (2015)	Ghayal: Once Again (2016)

Katyar Kaljat Ghusali is the soundtrack to the 2015 Marathi film of the same name directed by Subodh Bhave based on the 1967 stage play by Purushottam Darvhekar. The film features 17 songs—which included original songs composed by Shankar–Ehsaan–Loy (in their Marathi debut) and the recreations of original music from the play composed by Jitendra Abhisheki and written by Darvhekar. The original songs had lyrics written by Sameer Samant, Mangesh Kangane, Mandar Cholkar and Prakash Kapadia. The soundtrack was released by Zee Music Company on 16 October 2015.

== Background ==
Shankar Mahadevan felt it challenging on creating an original classical soundtrack, as well as retaining the flavour of the play. He did not want to tamper the sanctity of Abhisheki's music as "it is the DNA of every Maharashtrian" but had an opportunity to compose several genres which includes, Bandish, qawwali, bhajan and semi-classical music given his chance to widen his musical scope since the past 30 years. Ehsaan Noorani felt it as a learning experience on being influenced with classical music, who praised Mahadevan as a maestro in that genre.

== Track listing ==
No.	Title	Lyrics	Music	Singer(s)	Length
1.	"Yaar Illahi (Qawwali)"	Sameer Samant	Shankar–Ehsaan–Loy	Arshad Muhammad, Divya Kumar, Arijit Singh	6:00
2.	"Sur Niragas Ho"	Mangesh Kangane	Shankar–Ehsaan–Loy	Shankar Mahadevan, Aanandi Joshi, and Chorus	5:39
3.	"Dil Ki Tapish"	Sameer Samant	Shankar–Ehsaan–Loy	Rahul Deshpande, Ankita Joshi	2:36
4.	"Aruni Kirani"	Sameer Samant	Shankar–Ehsaan–Loy	Mahesh Kale	3:59
5.	"Bhola Bhandari"	Mangesh Kangane	Shankar–Ehsaan–Loy	Arijit Singh, Shivam Mahadevan	3:30
6.	"Din Gele"	Purushottam Darvhekar	Jitendra Abhisheki	Shankar Mahadevan	1:06
7.	"Ghei Chhand Makarand I"	Purushottam Darvhekar	Jitendra Abhisheki	Shankar Mahadevan	3:20
8.	"Ghei Chhand Makarand II"	Purushottam Darvhekar	Jitendra Abhisheki	Rahul Deshpande	2:54
9.	"Katyar Kaljat Ghusali (Theme)"	—	Shankar–Ehsaan–Loy	Instrumental	3:09
10.	"Lagi Karejwa Katar"	Purushottam Darvhekar	Jitendra Abhisheki	Jitendra Abhisheki	4:31
11.	"Man Mandira I"	Mandar Cholkar	Shankar–Ehsaan–Loy	Shankar Mahadevan	4:39
12.	"Man Mandira II"	Mandar Cholkar	Shankar–Ehsaan–Loy	Shivam Mahadevan	2:42
13.	"Muralidhar Shyam"	Purushottam Darvhekar	Jitendra Abhisheki	Shankar Mahadevan	0:43
14.	"Sur Se Saji"	Prakash Kapadia, Sameer Samant	Shankar–Ehsaan–Loy	Rahul Deshpande	2:45
15.	"Surat Piya Ki"	Purushottam Darvhekar	Jitendra Abhisheki	Rahul Deshpande, Mahesh Kale	3:16
16.	"Tarana"	—	Shankar–Ehsaan–Loy	Mahesh Kale, Savani Shende	1:32
17.	"Tejonidhi Lohagol"	Purushottam Darvhekar	Jitendra Abhisheki	Shankar Mahadevan	4:22
Total length:					56:43

== Critical reception ==
Vipin Nair of Music Aloud gave 9 out of 10, saying "First time that Shankar Ehsaan Loy get to do an all-out classical album, and they produce one of their best ever works" and called it as a "classy Marathi debut from the trio". Karthik Srinivasan of Milliblog called it as a "stunning Marathi debut by the trio, that aligns more with Shankar’s musical sensibilities." Preethi Kulkarni of BollywoodLife wrote "The soulful notes of classical music will echo in your ears amidst today's commercial masala tracks". Subhash K. Jha's analysis on Firstpost over bringing classical music back to Bollywood, described the film "as an effective instrument of change whereby the flourishing annihilation of indigenous sounds in our cinema is stunned and reversed". He said that the music transported the audience to "a world of unhampered tonal ripeness" plucked from Indian classical instruments to contemporary audience with sincerity and passion.

== Industry response ==
Katyar Kaljat Ghusali's success was heavily attributed to the film's classical music, as the predominant factor. Actor-director Mahesh Manjrekar also opined that "Music is the hero of Katyar [Kaljat Ghusali]. There are many people like me who have not heard the originals sung by Hindustani classical vocalist Vasantrao Deshpande." Shashi Vyas, founder of the classical music event company, Pancham Nishad said that: "In an age of multiple musical styles and platforms, it is a tedious process to get people inclined towards classical music. But I must say that KKG has broken that bottleneck [...] The centrality of this movie is music, which is pulling all kinds of music aficionados to the theatres [...] If out of one lakh people going to watch KKG, even 1,000 are converted to follow classical music, it is a good beginning."

== Accolades ==
In addition to the following awards, the film's music was considered for the UNESCO's Fellini medal for Outstanding Achievement in Music.

Award	Category	Recipient	Result
Filmfare Awards Marathi	Best Music Director	Shankar–Ehsaan–Loy	Won
Filmfare Awards Marathi	Best Lyricist	Mangesh Kangane – ("Sur Niragas Ho")	Won
Filmfare Awards Marathi	Best Playback Singer – Male	Shankar Mahadevan – ("Sur Niragas Ho")	Won
Filmfare Awards Marathi	Best Background Score	Santosh Mulekar	Won
Maharashtra State Film Awards	Best Music Director	Shankar–Ehsaan–Loy	Won
Maharashtra State Film Awards	Best Lyricist	Sameer Samant – ("Aruni Kirani")	Nominated
Maharashtra State Film Awards	Best Male Playback Singer	Mahesh Kale – ("Aruni Kirani")	Won
Maharashtracha Favourite Kon?	Favourite Song	"Sur Niragas Ho"	Nominated
Maharashtracha Favourite Kon?	Favourite Singer – Male	Shankar Mahadevan – ("Sur Niragas Ho")	Nominated
Maharashtracha Favourite Kon?	Favourite Singer – Male	Mahesh Kale – ("Aruni Kirani")	Nominated
Maharashtracha Favourite Kon?	Favourite Singer – Female	Anandi Joshi – ("Sur Niragas Ho")	Nominated
National Film Awards	Best Male Playback Singer	Mahesh Kale	Won
Sanskruti Kala Darpan Awards	Best Music	Jitendra Abhisheki and Shankar-Ehsaan-Loy	Nominated
Sanskruti Kala Darpan Awards	Best Playback Singer (Male)	Shankar Mahadevan – ("Sur Niragas Ho")	Nominated
Sanskruti Kala Darpan Awards	Best Playback Singer (Male)	Rahul Deshpande and Mahesh Kale – ("Surat Piya Ki")	Won
Sanskruti Kala Darpan Awards	Best Lyricist	Purushottam Darvhekar	Won
Zee Chitra Gaurav Puraskar	Best Music	Shankar-Ehsaan-Loy	Won
Zee Chitra Gaurav Puraskar	Best Playback Singer – Male	Shankar Mahadevan – ("Sur Niragas Ho")	Won
Zee Chitra Gaurav Puraskar	Best Lyricist	Mangesh Kangane – ("Sur Niragas Ho")	Won
Zee Chitra Gaurav Puraskar	Special Jury Award Best Singers	Rahul Deshpande and Mahesh Kale – ("Surat Piya Ki")	Won
Zee Chitra Gaurav Puraskar	Best Background Music	Santosh Mulekar	Won
