= Katyar Kaljat Ghusali =

Katyar Kaljat Ghusali (lit. 'A dagger through the heart' in Marathi) may refer to:

- Katyar Kaljat Ghusali (play), 1967 play by Indian writer Purushottam Darvhekar
- Katyar Kaljat Ghusali (film), 2015 Indian film adaptation by Subodh Bhave
  - Katyar Kaljat Ghusali (soundtrack), by Shankar–Ehsaan–Loy and Jitendra Abhisheki
