= Faiyaz Shaikh =

Indian actress and singer

Faiyaz
- Born: Faiyaz Shaikh; Poona, Bombay Province, India
- Occupations: Actress, singer
- Years active: 1965–present

Faiyaz Shaikh, also known mononymously as Faiyaz, is an Indian actress and singer who is best known for her work in the Marathi theatre.

== Biography ==
Faiyaz Shaikh was born in Poona in a Marathi Muslim family. She was brought up and did her schooling in Solapur, where her family moved while she was an infant. Having initially performing minor roles in plays organised by local groups in Solapur, Faiyaz acted in an amateur production of P. L. Deshpande's play Tujhe Aahe Tujpashi by the Central Railway Dramatic Club, alongside Jabbar Patel. While in school, she initially wished to complete college education and become a lecturer.

In 1965, Faiyaz moved to Bombay after completing her matriculation, and began her career as a professional actor with a role in Sumatibai Dhanavate's play Geet Gaile Aasavani, which failed commercially. Though Faiyaz's role in the play drew attention in Bombay's theatre circles, she thereafter struggled for some time to get roles in other plays. She contemplated returning to Solapur, but remained in Mumbai, and soon was chosen for the small role of Neelam in a production of Vasant Kanetkar's play Ashroonchi Zhali Phule by the Marathi theatre company Natyasampada. Before long she took up the major role of Sumitra in the play, and thereafter collaborated with Natyasampada as an actress in several other plays.

Faiyaz's role as Zarina in Purushottam Darvhekar's musical Katyar Kaljat Ghusali (1967) was a milestone in her career; both the play and its songs, including "Lagi Karejwa Katar", which was sung by Faiyaz in the play, became popular. Faiyaz played Zarina in the play for several years, alongside first Vasantrao Deshpande, who played Khansaheb, and later Deshpande's successor in the role Chandrakant Limaye. Another milestone in her career was V. V. Shirwadkar's play Veej Mhanali Dhartila, in which she played the character Julekha and performed several songs. After learning lavani singing from Tukaram Shinde, she worked as a lavani singer in Dada Kondke's folk play Viccha Majhi Puri Kara. She went on to perform songs in over 750 performances of Viccha Majhi Puri Kara. She has sung some songs and voiced the dialogues of Jijabai in Babasaheb Purandare's epic play Janata Raja.

Overall, Faiyaz has been a part of over 4,500 play performances in Marathi; she has acted in several genres of plays, including musicals, comedies, social plays, mythological plays and history plays. Besides her theatre roles, Faiyaz has worked as a film and television actress and as a playback singer in some films. She has acted in television shows that appeared on DD Sahyadri and Zee Marathi, while her role in the Marathi film Mahananda (1984) was praised by critics. As a playback singer, Faiyaz has worked with several music composers, such as R. D. Burman, C. Ramchandra, Madan Mohan and Jaidev.

Faiyaz has received several awards and honours, including the Annasaheb Kirloskar Theatre Lifetime Achievement Award, the Vidhyadhar Gokhale Memorial Award in 2015 and the Vishnudas Bhave Award. She was unanimously elected at the president of the 95th Akhil Bharatiya Marathi Natya Sammelan, which was held in Belgaum from February 6–8, 2015.

== Acting credits ==
=== Theatre ===
Title	Role
Ashroonchi Zhali Phule	Neelam, Sumitra
Katyar Kaljat Ghusali	Zarina
Veej Mhanali Dhartila	Julekha
To Mee Navhech	Chanakka, Sunanda Datar
Panditraj Jagannath	Lavangika
Guntata Hriday He	Kalyani
Matsyagandha	Satyavati
Viccha Majhi Puri Kara	Lavani singer
Janata Raja	Jijabai (voice only)

=== Films ===
Year	Title	Role
1984	Mahananda	Maanu

=== Television ===
Year	Title	Role	Channel
2005	Ya Sukhano Ya	Vrinda Mavshi	Zee Marathi
2009	Anubandha	Rama Aatya	Zee Marathi

== External lines ==
- Faiyaz Shaikh at IMDb
