= 7th Filmfare Awards Marathi =

Indian film awards

7th Filmfare Marathi Awards
- Presented on: 30 March 2023
- Site: Mahakavi Kalidas Natyamandir, Mumbai
- Hosted by: Siddhartha Jadhav, Amey Wagh
- Organized by: Planet Marathi

Highlights
- Best Film: Godavari
- Best Critic: Me Vasantrao
- Most awards: Me Vasantrao (7)
- Most nominations: Panghrun (16)

Television coverage
- Network: Zee Marathi

The 7th Filmfare Marathi Awards is a ceremony, presented by Planet Marathi, honored the best Indian Marathi-language films of 2022.

Panghrun led the ceremony with 16 nominations, followed by Me Vasantrao with 15 nominations, Ved with 13 nominations, and Chandramukhi and Godavari with 12 nominations each.

Me Vasantrao won the most awards, with 7, including Best Supporting Actress and Best Film (Critics). Godavari was the runner-up of the ceremony with 5 awards, including Best Film, Best Director and Best Actor (Critics).

Director Pravin Tarde received dual nominations in the Best Director category for Dharmaveer and Sarsenapati Hambirrao, but lost to Nikhil Mahajan who won the award for Godavari. Sai Tamhankar earned dual nominations for Best Actress and Best Actress (Critics) for her performance in Pondicherry, winning for latter, while Amruta Khanvikar received dual nominations for Best actress and Best Supporting Actress for her performance in Chandramukhi and Pondicherry respectively.

== Ceremony ==
It was held at Mahakavi Kalidas Natyamandir, the 7th Filmfare Marathi Awards honored the films released in 2022. At a press conference, the editor of Filmfare magazine revealed Planet Marathi as the title sponsor. Actors Amey Wagh and Siddhartha Jadhav were announced as the co-hosts, while singer Usha Uthup and actor Sonali Kulkarni, Amruta Khanvilkar, Vaidehi Parashurami, Sanskruti Balgude, Sonalee Kulkarni, Pushkar Jog and Shreyas Talpade were announced to be performing during the event. It took place on 27 March 2023, and was broadcast on 31 March 2023 on Zee Marathi.

== Winners and nominees ==
The nominations were announced by Filmfare on 18 February 2023.

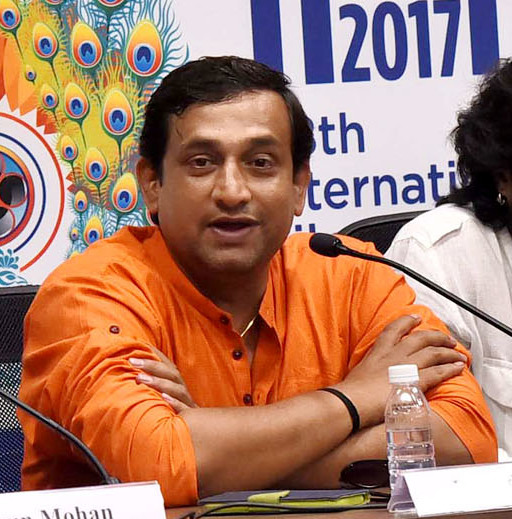
Prasad Oak – Best Actor winner for Dharmaveer

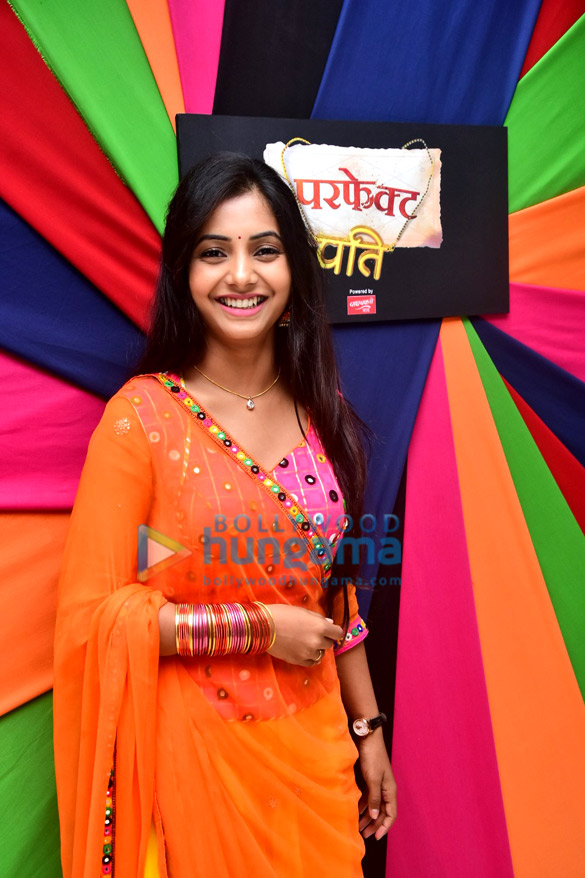
Sayali Sanjeev – Best Actress winner for Goshta Eka Paithanichi

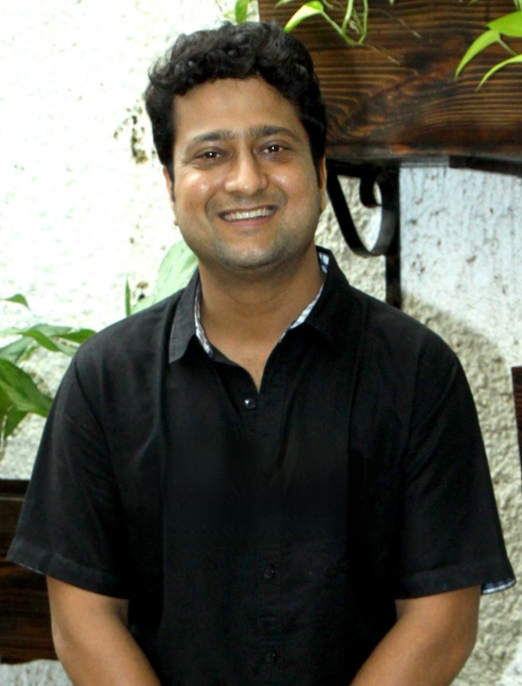
Jitendra Joshi – Best Actor Critics winner for Godavari

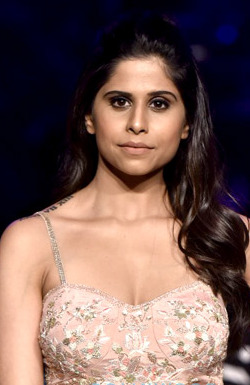
Sai Tamhankar – Best Actress Critics winner for Pondicherry

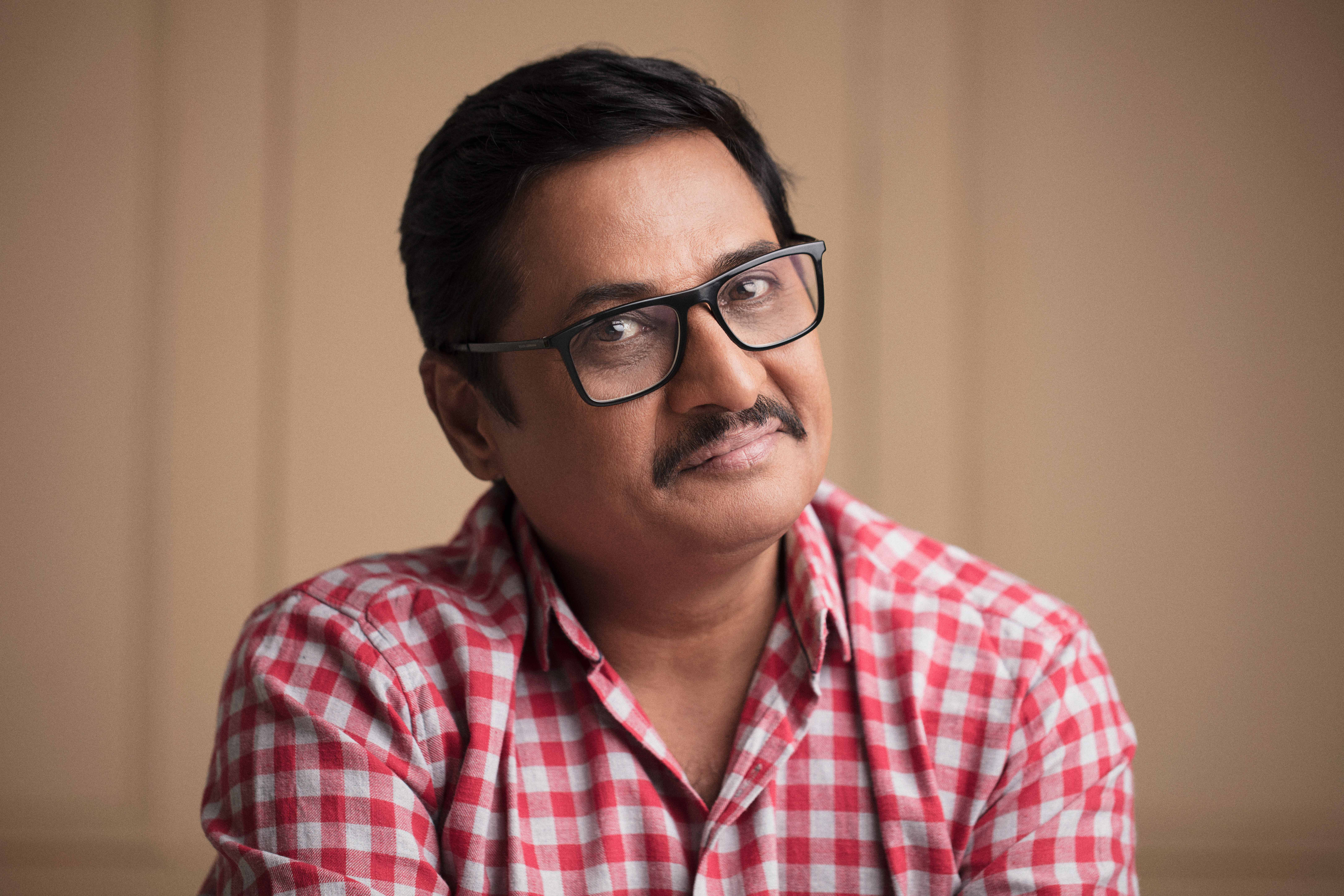
Nandu Madhav – Best Supporting Actor winner for Y

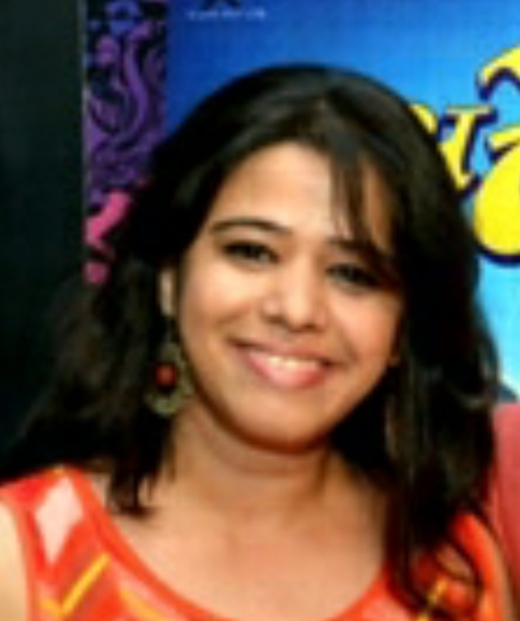
Anita Date-Kelkar – Best Supporting Actress winner for Me Vasantrao

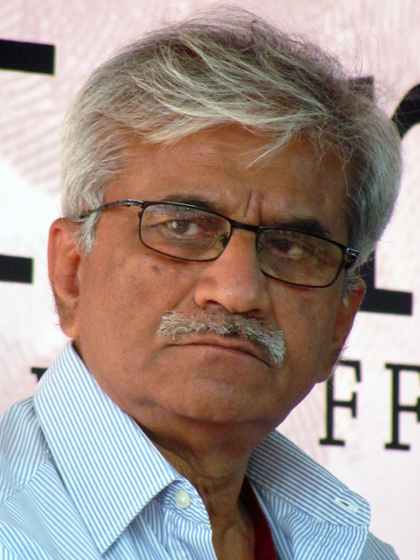
Jabbar Patel – Lifetime Achievement Awardee

Best Film	Best Director
Godavari; Chandramukhi; Dharmaveer; Me Vasantrao; Panghrun; Pawankhind; Sarsenapati Hambirrao	Nikhil Mahajan – Godavari; Digpal Lanjekar – Pawankhind; Mahesh Manjrekar – Panghrun; Nipun Dharmadhikari – Me Vasantrao; Prasad Oak – Chandramukhi; Pravin Tarde – Dharmaveer; Pravin Tarde – Sarsenapati Hambirrao
Best Actor	Best Actress
Prasad Oak – Dharmaveer as Anand Dighe; Adinath Kothare – Chandramukhi as Daulatrao Deshmane; Ankush Chaudhari – Daagadi Chawl 2 as Suryakant Shinde (Surya); Jitendra Joshi – Godavari as Nishikant Deshmukh; Lalit Prabhakar – Sunny as Sunny; Riteish Deshmukh – Ved as Satya Jadhav; Sharad Kelkar – Har Har Mahadev as Baji Prabhu Deshpande	Sayali Sanjeev – Goshta Eka Paithanichi as Indrayani; Amruta Khanvilkar – Chandramukhi as Chandramukhi Umajirao Junnarkar (Chandra); Genelia Deshmukh – Ved as Shravani Jadhav; Mukta Barve – Y as Dr. Aarti Deshmukh; Sai Tamhankar – Pondicherry as Nikita; Sonalee Kulkarni – Tamasha Live as Shefali
Best Supporting Actor	Best Supporting Actress
Nandu Madhav – Y as Dr. Purshottam; Ajay Purkar – Pawankhind as Baji Prabhu Deshpande; Ashok Saraf – Ved as Dinkar Jadhav; Gashmeer Mahajani – Sarsenapati Hambirrao as Chhatrapati Shivaji Maharaj / Chhatrapati Sambhaji Maharaj; Priyadarshan Jadhav – Godavari as Keshav; Rohit Phalke – Panghrun as Madhav	Anita Date-Kelkar – Me Vasantrao as Vasantrao's Mother; Amruta Khanvilkar – Pondicherry as Manasi; Kshitee Jog – Sunny; Mrinal Kulkarni – Sher Shivraj as Rajmata Jijabai; Neena Kulkarni – Medium Spicy as Nissim' mother; Veena Jamkar – Mann Kasturi Re as Siddhant's mother
Best Director Debut	Best Female Debut
Ajit Wadikar – Y; Trushant Ingle – Zollywood; Pratap Phad – Ananya; Riteish Deshmukh – Ved; Sanket Mane – Mann Kasturi Re	Gauri Ingawale – Panghrun as Laxmi; Hruta Durgule – Ananya as Ananya; Jiya Shankar – Ved as Nisha Katkar; Tejasswi Prakash – Mann Kasturi Re as Shruti Sarnaik
Best Music Director	Best Lyricist
Ajay Atul – Chandramukhi; Ajay Atul – Ved; Amitraj, Pankaj Padghan – Tamasha Live; Hitesh Modak, Saleel Kulkarni, Pawandeep Rajan, Ajit Parab – Panghrun; Rahul Deshpande – Me Vasantrao; Souumil-Siddharth – Sunny	Vaibhav Joshi – "Kaivalyagaan" – Me Vasantrao; Ajay-Atul – "Sukh Kalale" – Ved; Ajay-Atul, Guru Thakur – "Bai Ga" – Chandramukhi; Jitendra Joshi " Khal Khal Goda" – Godavari; Mangesh Kangane – "Anand Harapla" – Dharmaveer; Vaibhav Joshi – "Hee Anokhi Gaath" – Panghrun
Best Playback Singer – Male	Best Playback Singer – Female
Rahul Deshpande – "Kaivalyagaan" – Me Vasantrao; Ajay Gogavale – "Kanha" – Chandramukhi; Ajay Gogavale – "Ved Tujha"– Ved; Anand Bhate, Prathamesh Laghate – "Ilusa Ha Deh" – Panghrun; Avadhoot Gupte " Raja Aala" – Pawankhind; Rahul Deshpande – "Khal Khal Goda" – Godavari; Saurabh Salunke – "Anand Harpla" – Dharmaveer	Aarya Ambekar – "Bai Ga" – Chandramukhi; Shreya Ghoshal – "Chandra" – Chandramukhi; Shreya Ghoshal – "Sukh Kalale" – Ved; Shreya Ghoshal – "Ram Ram" – Me Vasantrao; Priyanka Barve – "Bindiya Le Gayi" – Me Vasantrao; Anandi Joshi – "Rang Lagala" – Tamasha Live

Critics' awards

Best Film
Nipun Dharmadhikari – Me Vasantrao; Ajit Wadikar – Y; Mahesh Manjrekar – Panghrun; Nikhil Mahajan – Godavari; Sachin Kundalkar – Pondicherry; Shantanu Ganesh Rode – Goshta Eka Paithanichi; Trushant Ingle – Zollywood
Best Actor	Best Actress
Jitendra Joshi – Godavari as Nishikant Deshmukh; Prasad Oak – Dharmaveer as Anand Dighe; Rahul Deshpande – Me Vasantrao as Vasantrao Deshpande; Siddharth Jadhav – Baalbhaarti as Rahul Desai; Sumeet Raghavan – Ekda Kaay Zala as Kiran	Sai Tamhankar – Pondicherry as Nikita; Gauri Ingawle – Panghrun as Laxmi; Hruta Durgule – Ananya as Ananya; Mukta Barve – Y as Dr. Aarti Deshmukh; Sayali Sanjeev – Goshta Eka Paithanichi as Indrayani

Technical Awards

Best Story	Best Screenplay
Shantanu Ganesh Rode – Goshta Eka Paithanichi; B. B. Borkar – Panghrun; Salil Kulkarni – Ekda Kaay Zala; Hemant Dhome – Sunny; Nikhil Mahajan, Prajakt Deshmukh – Godavari; Tejas Modak, Sachin Kundalkar – Pondicherry	Nikhil Mahajan, Prajakt Deshmukh – Godavari; Ajit Wadikar, Swapneel Sojwal, Sandeep Dandwate - Y; Irawati Karnik – Sunny; Mahesh Manjrekar, Ganesh Matkari – Panghrun; Trushant Ingle – Zollywood; Nipun Dharmadhikari – Me Vasantrao
Best Dialogue	Best Editing
Pravin Tarde – Dharmaveer; Digpal Lanjekar – Pawankhind; Irawati Karnik – Medium Spicy; Prajakt Deshmukh – Godavari; Chinmay Mandlekar – Chandramukhi; Shantanu Ganesh Rode – Goshta Eka Paithanichi; Upendra Sidhaye, Nipun Dharmadhikari – Me Vasantrao	Jayant Jathar – Y; Faisal-Imran – Daagadi Chawl 2; Chandan Arora – Ved; Pramod Kahar – Pawankhind; Sagar Shinde, Vinay Shinde, Ninad Kaskhedikar – Sher Shivraj; Vaibhav Dabhade – Zollywood
Best Choreography	Best Cinematography
Deepali Vichare – "Chandra" – Chandramukhi; Ashish Patil – "Bai Ga" – Chandramukhi; Kiran Borkar – "Raja Aala" – Pawankhind; Ranju Varghese – "Angaat Aalaya" – Zombivli; Ranju Varghese – "Ved Lavlay" – Ved; Umesh Jadhav – "Ashatami" – Dharmaveer	Mahesh Limaye – Sarsenapati Hambirrao; Bhushankumar Jain – Ved; Karan B Ravat – Panghrun; Abhimanyu Dange – Me Vasantrao; Milind Jog – Pondicherry; Shamin Kulkarni – Godavari
Best Production Design	Best Sound Design
Ashok Lokare, A. Rucha – Me Vasantrao; Ashish Mehta – Medium Spicy; Divya Goswami – Pondicherry; Madan Mane – Sarsenapati Hambirrao; Prashant Rane – Panghrun; Pratik Redij – Sher Shivraj	Anmol Bhave – Me Vasantrao; Anita Kushwaha – Pondicherry; Anita Kushwaha – Medium Spicy; Baylon Fonseca – Godavari; Lochan Kanvinde – Zombivli; Sunil Agarwal – Panghrun
Best Background Score	Best Costume Design
AV Prafullchandra – Godavari; Debarpito Saha – Pondicherry; Hitesh Modak – Panghrun; Parag Chhabra – Y; Sarang Kulkarni, Saurabh Bhalerao – Me Vasantrao; Saurabh Bhalerao – Medium Spicy	Sachin Lovalekar – Me Vasantrao; Laxman Gollar – Panghrun; Manasi Attarde – Sarsenapati Hambirrao; Nachiket Barve – Har Har Mahadev; Purnima Oak – Sher Shivraj; Amit Divekar – Pondicherry

Special awards

Lifetime Achievement Award
- Jabbar Patel
Best Child Artist
- Aryan Menghji – Baalbhaarti
- Khushi Hajare – Ved as Khushi

== Superlatives ==
Multiple nominations
Nominations	Film
16	Panghrun
15	Me Vasantrao
13	Ved
12	Chandramukhi
12	Godavari
10	Pondicherry
8	Y
8	Dharmaveer
7	Pawankhind
6	Sarsenapati Hambirrao

Multiple wins
Awards	Film
7	Me Vasantrao
5	Godavari
3	Chandramukhi
3	Y
2	Dharmaveer
2	Goshta Eka Paithanichi
2	Sarsenapati Hambirrao
