= Prasad Sawkar =

Indian vocalist (1928–2026)

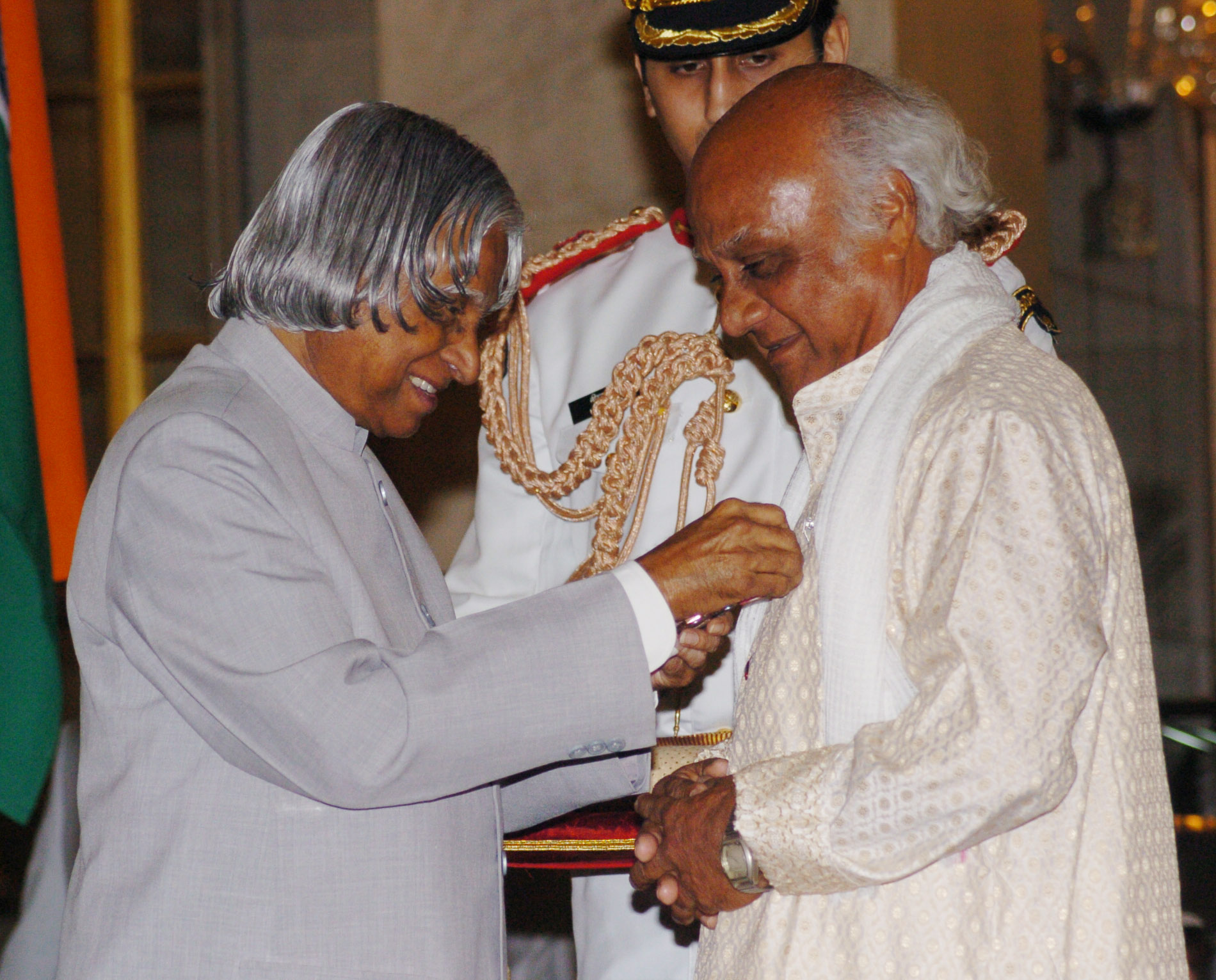
- Sawkar in 2006

Background information
- Also known as: Prasad Sawkar
- Born: Sambaprasad; 14 December 1928; Baroda, Baroda State, British India
- Died: 17 June 2026 (aged 97) Caranzalem, Goa, India
- Genres: Classical, semi-classical, devotional, musical theatre
- Occupations: Singer, composer, music teacher

Pandit Prasad Sawkar (14 December 1928 – 17 June 2026) was an Indian vocalist and scholar of Indian classical, semi-classical, and devotional music. He received prestigious Padma Shri award in the year 2006 for his work in music and Sangeet Natak.

== Early life and background ==
Sambaprasad Raghuvir Sawkar was born in Baroda, Gujarat, in a family of musicians and actors hailing from Goa. His father, Raghuvir Sawkar, was a singer and actor who was famous for acting a ladies character in the play who was known as Rangdevta. He took his formal education in music and acting from his father. Later he came under the influence of great musicians such as Jitendra Abhisheki and Nivruttibuwa Sarnaik.

== Career ==
Sawkar acted as child artist in the play Jinjihun Sutka (जिंजीहून सुटका) as Bal Shivaji at the start of career in Marathi theatre. Later he went to his uncle Dattaram Sawkar for school education at Mhapsa who was also a harmonium player. Sawkar continued getting training of music over there. He played a role of 'Kruttika' in the play "Sanshay Kallol". He also made a record by playing four characters in the same play namely Kruttika, Sadhu, Singer and Vaishakh Sheth. Later he played in plays like Soubhadra, Mruchchakatik, Vidyharan, Manapman with "Kala Mandir" organization.

He played important roles with the organization "Natyniketan" in the plays like Rambha, Kulvadhu, Kone eke kali, Ek hota Mhatara, Lagnachi Bedi etc.

Sawkar also made career in Marathi Cinema which includes Pedgaoche Shahane, Gora Kumbhar.

The period between 1960 and 1972 is known for the revival of Sangeet natak (play) in the industry. Sawkar played a major role in this. He was instrumental by acting in "Panditrao Jagannath" and "Suvarnatula" which got wide popularity. He started getting recognized by popular singer cum actor on the stage with this. In the year 1967, he played the role of "Sadashiv" in the play Katyar kaljat ghusli and worked closely with Purushottam Darvhekar, Jitendra Abhisheki and Vasantrao Deshpande. The song Ghei chand makarand is known as a milestone in the musical plays.

He travelled to United States with his wife in 1972 and played small roles in his plays over there which also became very popular.

== Death ==
Sawkar died on 17 June 2026, at the age of 97.

== Plays ==
- Jinjihun Sutka जिंजीहून सुटका
- Sanshay Kallol संशयकल्लोळ
- Soubhadra सौभद्र
- Mruchchakatik मृच्छकटिक
- Vidyharan विद्याहरण
- Manapman मानापमान
- Rambha रंभा (१९५२)
- Kulvadhu कुलवधू
- Kone eke kali कोणे एके काळी
- Lagnachi Bedi एक होता म्हातारा
- Panditrao Jagannath पंडितराज जगन्नाथ 1960
- Suvarnatula सुवर्णतुला 1960
- Mandarmala मंदारमाला 1963
- Jai Jai Gourishankar जय जय गौरीशंकर 1966
- Katyar kaljat ghusli कट्यार काळजात घुसली 1967
- Ghanshyam nayani aala घनश्याम नयनी आला 1968
- To Rajhans Ek तो राजहंस एक 1975
- Amrut mohini अमृत मोहिनी
- Avagha rang ekachi rang अवघा रंग एकचि रंग

== Film ==
- Pedgaoche Shahane पेडगावचे शहाणे
- Gora Kumbhar गोरा कुंभार

== Popular songs ==
1. Ghei Chand Makarand घेई छंद मकरंद
2. Jai Gange Bhagirathi जय गंगे भागिरथी
3. Narayana Ramaramana नारायणा रमारमणा
4. Sapt Sur Zankarit Bole सप्त सूर झंकारीत होते
5. Utha Pandharichya Raja ऊठ पंढरीच्या राजा
6. Jay Gange Bhagirathi जय गंगे भागीरथी
7. Tare Nahi Ye To Raat Ko तारे नहीं ये तो रात को
8. Narayana Rama Ramana नारायणा रमा रमणा
9. Patit Pavan Naam Aikuni पतित पावन नाम ऐकुनी
10. Priya Na Kavan Tuj प्रिय न कवण तुज
11. Basant Ki Bahar Aayi बसंत की बहार आयी
12. Bujhavo Deep A Sajani बुझावो दीप ए सजनी
13. Bhare Manat Sundara भरे मनात सुंदरा
14. Bhagya Surya Nashuni भाग्यसूर्य नाशुनि तिमिरा
15. Muralidhar Shyam He मुरलीधर श्याम हे नंदलाल
16. Yogi Pavan Manacha योगी पावन मनाचा
17. Ratihun Sundar Madan रतिहुन सुंदर मदनमंजिरी
18. Ragini Mukhachandrama रागिणी-मुखचंद्रमा
19. SaptSur Jhankarit Bole सप्‍तसूर झंकारित बोले
20. Sab Gunijan Mil Gavo सब गुनिजन मिल गावो
21. Savan Ghan Garaje Bajaye सावन घन गरजे बजाये
22. Sukhavito Madhumas Ha सुखवितो मधुमास हा
23. Hi Kanakangi Kon Lalana ही कनकांगी कोण ललना

== Awards and recognitions ==
- Master Deenanath Mangeshkar Smruti award
- Jeevan Gourav Award from Maharashtra State Government
- Panchratna Award
- Padma Shri
