= Maharashtra State Film Award for Best Male Playback Singer =

Indian film award

Maharashtra State Film Awards for Best Male Playback Singer
- Awarded for: Best Male Playback Singer
- Country: India
- Presented by: Government of Maharashtra
- First award: Talat Mahmood, Putra Vhava Aisa (1962)

The Maharashtra State Film Award for Best Playback Singer Male was instituted in 1962, and has been presented at the Maharashtra State Film Awards for best male playback singer in Marathi cinema.

The first recipient of the award was Talat Mahmood who was honoured for his song "Yash Hain Amrut Zale" for the film Putra Vhava Aisa in 1962. Suresh Wadkar is the most frequent winner, having won eleven awards. Ravindra Sathe has won it ten times. Sudhir Phadke has won it five times whereas Ajay Gogavale has won it three times. Hridaynath Mangeshkar, Jaywant Kulkarni, Rahul Deshpande and Shankar Mahadevan have won the award twice each.

== Winners ==
| Year | Photos of Winners | Recipient | Song | Film | Ref |
|---|---|---|---|---|---|
| 1962 | | Talat Mahmood | "Yash He Amrut Zale" | Putra Vhava Aisa | |
| 1963 | – | Chhota Gandharva | "Shura Me Vandile" | Rangalya Ratri Asha | |
| 1964 | Not awarded | | | | |
| 1965 | – | Balakram | "Shravan Bala Pani Aan" | Vavtal | |
| 1966 | Not awarded | | | | |
| 1967 | | Sudhir Phadke | "Santh Wahate Krushnamai" | Santh Wahate Krushnamai | |
| 1968 | | Sudhir Phadke | "Dehachi Tijori" | Aamhi Jato Amuchya Gava | |
| 1969 | – | Mahendra Kapoor | "Sang Kadhi Kalnar Tula" | Aparadh | |
| 1970 | | Sudhir Phadke | "Dhundi Kalyanna, Dhundi Phulanna" | Dhakti Bahin | |
| 1971 | | Manna Dey | "Number Fifty Four" | Gharkul | |
| 1972-73 | – | Jaywant Kulkarni | "Mansa Paris Mendhra Bari" | Ekta Jeev Sadashiv | |
| 1974 | | Sudhir Phadke | "Aga Ithala" | Kartiki | |
| 1975 | – | Jaywant Kulkarni | "Hi Duniya Haay Ek Jatra" | Jyotibacha Navas | |
| 1976 | | Sudhir Phadke | "Ya Sukhano Ya" | Ya Sukhano Ya | |
| 1977 | – | Chandrashekhar Gadgil | "Jagane Vikat Ghetali Preet" | Mansa Paris Mendhra Bari | |
| 1978 | | Ravindra Sathe | "Pik Karpala" | Jait Re Jait | |
| 1979 | | Suresh Wadkar | "Jhan Jhananana Chhedilya Tara" | Haldi Kunku | |
| 1980 | | Suresh Wadkar | "Dayaghana" | Sansar | |
| 1981 | | Suresh Wadkar | "Kalya Matit Matit" | Are Sansar Sansar | |
| 1982 | – | Shrikant Pargaonkar | "Tuch Maay Baap Bandhu" | Ek Daav Bhutacha | |
| 1983 | | Suresh Wadkar | "Mansa Daiva Kunala Kalale" | Sansar Pakhrancha | |
| 1984 | | Suresh Wadkar | "Jeevanachi Ghadi" | Rath Jagannathacha | |
| 1985 | – | Shrikant Pargaonkar | "Chunuk Chunuk Taal Vaajvi" | Fukat Chambu Baburao | |
| 1986 | | Suresh Wadkar | "Aalo Sharan Tula Bhagwanta" | Purna Satya | |
| 1987 | | Suresh Wadkar | "Vahini Saheb" | Vahini Saheb | |
| 1988 | | Ajit Kadkade | "Alaukik Dattatray Avatar" | Aai Pahije | |
| 1989 | | Hridaynath Mangeshkar | "Tu Tevha Tashi" | Nivdung | |
| 1990 | | Suresh Wadkar | "Ubhe Abhagi Jeevan Gane" | Aaghat | |
| 1991 | | Ravindra Sathe | "Survya Ala Ho Ala" | Pashchatap | |
| 1992 | | Ravindra Sathe | "Mee Gatana Geet" | Ek Hota Vidushak | |
| 1993 | | Ravindra Sathe | "Saubhagya Kankan" | Saubhagya Kankan | |
| 1994 | | Shridhar Phadke | "Dukh Bandhanacha Nahi" | Vishwavinayak | |
| 1995 | | Hridaynath Mangeshkar | "He Geet Jivanache" | He Geet Jivanache | |
| 1996 | | Ravindra Sathe | "Valnavar Bhetatat Kshan Saare" | Rao Saheb | |
| 1997 | – | Achyut Thakur | "Jivan Ha Sagara" | Paij Lagnachi | |
| 1998 | | Ravindra Sathe | "Jal Dahulale Bimb Harapale" | Tu Tithe Mee | |
| 1999 | | Shankar Mahadevan | "Sakhi Majhi" | Sakhi Majhi | |
| 2000 | – | Sangeet Haldipur | "Hya Mothya Mansancha Kahi Khara Nahi" | Raju | |
| 2001 | | Suresh Wadkar | "Ek Hoti Vaadi" | Ek Hoti Vaadi | |
| 2002 | – | Ajit Parab | "Pawsachya Thembasathi" | Krishnakathchi Tara | |
| 2003 | | Suresh Wadkar | "Bhetichi Aavadi Utavil Mann" | Vitthal Vitthal | |
| 2004 | | Suresh Wadkar | "Raja Pandharicha" | Raja Pandharicha | |
| 2005 | – | Yash Narvekar | "Pak Pak Pakaak" | Pak Pak Pakaak | |
| 2006 | – | Swapnil Bandodkar | "Fulani Rusave" | Kshan | |
| 2007 | | Ajay-Atul | "Changbhal Ra Deva Changbhal Ra" | Tujhya Majhya Sansarala Ani Kay Hava | |
| 2008 | – | Achyut Thakur | "Prachivari Ye Bhaskar" | Marmabandh | |
| 2009 | | Ajay Gogavale | "Khel Mandala" | Natarang | |
| 2010 | – | Rajesh Datar | "Naman Natwara" | Samudra | |
| 2011 | | Anand Bhate | "Chinmay Sakal Hridaya" | Balgandharva | |
| 2012 | – | Dnyaneshwar Meshram | "Jagnyacha Paaya" | Tukaram | |
| 2013 | – | Prasenjit Kosambi | "Daha Dishatun" | Waghi | |
| 2014 | | Rohit Raut | "Sehar" | Candle March | |
| 2015 | | Mahesh Kale | "Aruni Kirani" | Katyar Kaljat Ghusali | |
| 2016 | – | Swapnil Bandodkar | "Jagnyache Deva" | Dashakriya | |
| 2017 | | Ajay Gogavale | "Devak Kalji Re" | Redu | |
| 2018 | – | Hrishikesh Ranade | "Tujhya Athvaninche" | Whatsup Lagna | |
| 2019 | | Sonu Nigam | "Yeshil Tu" | Miss U Mister | |
| 2020 | | Rahul Deshpande | "Vitthala Darshan Deun Jaa" | Me Vasantrao | |
| 2021 | | Rahul Deshpande | "Khal Khal Goda" | Godavari | |
| 2022 | – | Manish Rajgire | "Bhetla Vitthal Maza" | Dharmaveer | |
| 2023 | | Mohit Chauhan | "Ghar Banduk Biryani" | Ghar Banduk Biryani | |
| 2024 | | Adarsh Shinde | "Ghaav Lagla" | Lagna Kallol | |

== Multiple wins ==
Individuals with two or more Best Male playback singer awards:

| Wins | Recipients |
|---|---|
| 11 | Suresh Wadkar |
| 7 | Ravindra Sathe |
| 5 | Sudhir Phadke |
| 4 | Ajay Gogavale |
| 2 | Hridaynath Mangeshkar; Rahul Deshpande; Swapnil Bandodkar; Jaywant Kulkarni; Shrikant Pargaonkar |
