= Vasantotsav =

Music festival in Pune, India

- Dates: Traditionally in December/ January
- Locations: New English School, Ramanbaug, Pune, Maharashtra, India
- Years active: 1985 – present
- Founders: Rahul Deshpande, Dr Vasantrao Deshpande Pratishthan
- Website: www.vasantotsav.com

Vasantotsav is an annual Indian Classical music, semi classical, folk and light music festival held in Pune. The festival is organized by Dr. Vasantrao Deshpande Pratisthan, Pune, in the memory of the late Dr. Vasantrao Deshpande by inviting respected artists to perform at this event. Nana Patekar is the pillar supporting this entire event.

== History ==
The festival was started in the year 1985 on a small scale in Mumbai with the support of Nana Patekar. The festival played a key role in the development of Indian music. Later, the festival was conducted in Pune.

== Growth ==
Many artists have performed in the festival, such as Ustad Amjad Ali Khan, Ustad Zakir Hussain, Shankar Mahadevan, Abida Parveen, Mukul Shivputra, Niladri Kumar, Aman Ali Khan, Ayaan Ali Khan, Swapan Choudary, Roop Kumar Rathod, Ustad Rashid Khan, Ustad Shahid Parvez, Hariharan, Vikku Vinayakram, Kaushiki Chakrabarty, Shiva Mani, Shantanu Moitra, Swanand Kirkire, Pt. Rajan Mishra, Pt. Sajan Mishra, Suresh Wadkar, Daler Mehendi, Teejan Bai and Rahul Deshpande.

The newest artists who performed in 2016 include the Wadali Brothers, Mahesh Kale and George Brooks, among others.

The 2016 Vasantotsav was the 10th year of the event. This year, the event was kept free for the 14000 viewers. The event also consists of 100th show of Katyar Kaljat Ghusali (play). The play (Sangeet Natak)was done by Opera style with complete background of set of Katyar on the big stage. The play run for more than 3 hours with the standing ovation of viewers.

As per the plan, from the year 2016, Vasantotsav would be conducted all over Maharashtra so that people from other cities would also participate in the event. This would be done by Nasik and Nagpur. During Vasantotsav, the viewers donated money which was further given to Naam Foundation of Nana Patekar and Makarand Anaspure who are closely working and supporting farmers of Maharashtra.

== Annual awards ==
The ‘Vasantrao Deshpande Smruti Sanman’ and ‘Vasantrao Deshpande budding artist’ awards are presented to three artists in the categories of senior guru, music researcher, and talented young musician.

== 2016 Vasantotsav, Pune ==
Following artists performed in 2016 Vasantotsav held in Pune.

- Satish Vyas : Instrumental (Santoor) - Classical.
- Mahesh Kale : Vocal - Classical
- Wadali Brothers : Vocal - Sufi
- Meera Prasad: Instrumental (Sitar) - Classical
- Prahlad Tipaniya: Vocal - Folk
- Kumar Bose : Instrumental (Tabla) - Classical
- George Brooks and Rahul Deshpande : Fusion - Saxophone and Vocal

2016 Vasantotsav, Nasik is planned on 19th Feb.

== See also ==
- List of Indian classical music festivals
- Vasantrao Deshpande
- Rahul Deshpande
