= Me Vasantrao =

2022 Indian Marathi-language film

- Theatrical release poster
- Directed by: Nipun Dharmadhikari
- Written by: Nipun Dharmadhikari; Upendra Sidhaye
- Produced by: Darshan Desai; Mugdha Desai; Chandrashekhar Gokhale; Mrinal Gokhale; Ranjit Gugle; Niranjan Kirloskar
- Starring: Rahul Deshpande; Anita Date; Alok Rajwade
- Cinematography: Abhimanyu Dange
- Edited by: Faisal Mahadik; Imran Mahadik
- Music by: Rahul Deshpande
- Production company: Jio Studios
- Release date: 1 April 2022
- Running time: 178 minutes
- Country: India
- Language: Marathi

Me Vasantrao (transl. I am Vasantrao) is a 2022 Indian Marathi-language biographical film based on the life of the Indian classical musician Vasantrao Deshpande. The film is written by Nipun Dharmadhikari, Upendra Sidhaye and directed by Nipun Dharmadhikari. The film stars Rahul Deshpande, Vasantrao Deshpande's grandson, in the lead role. Me Vasantrao became the part of the eligibility list for the prestigious Academy Awards on 10 January 2023, which was a rare feat for Marathi cinema. The music of the film was released globally on 8 March 2022 under the music label OnClick Music which is a flagship music label of Movietone Digital Entertainment Pvt Ltd.

== Plot ==
The biographical film is based and portrays the story of Vasantrao Deshpande an Indian classical musician. He was known for his contribution towards Natya Sangeet.

== Cast ==
- Rahul Deshpande as Vasantrao Deshpande
- Anita Date-Kelkar as Vasantrao's Mother
- Pushkaraj Chirputkar as Purushottam Laxman Deshpande
- Durga Jasraj as Begum Akhtar
- Kaumudi Walokar
- Amey Wagh as Deenanath Mangeshkar
- Sarang Sathaye
- Alok Rajwade as Vasantrao's Mama
- Kumud Mishra as Ustaad
- Yatin Karyekar as Vasantrao's father

== Music ==
Music for this film is composed by Rahul Deshpande.

Me Vasantrao
No.	Title	Lyrics	Singer(s)	Length
1.	"Sur Sangat"		Vijay Koparkar, Anjali Gaikwad, Saurabh Kadgaonkar	6:17
2.	"Tere Dar Se"		Himani Kapoor, Rahul Deshpande	4:15
3.	"Punav Raticha"		Rahul Deshpande, Urmila Dhangar	5:36
4.	"Kaivalya Gaan"		Rahul Deshpande	5:47
5.	"Ram Ram Lori" (Male Version)	Mangesh Kangane	Rahul Deshpande	3:49
6.	"Lalana"		Rahul Deshpande	3:31
7.	"Sakali Uthu"		Shreya Ghoshal	1:14
8.	"Marwa"		Ustad Rashid Khan, Saurabh Kadgaonkar	4:02
9.	"Vitthala Darshan Deun Jaa"	Mangesh Kangane	Rahul Deshpande	4:34
10.	"Mai Patiya"		Rahul Deshpande	3:25
11.	"Bindiya Le Gayi"		Priyanka Barve	5:29
12.	"Pavan Chalat"		Rahul Deshpande	3:11
13.	"Le Chali Taqdeer"		Rahul Deshpande	3:38
14.	"Radhadhar Madhu Milind"		Rahul Deshpande	2:48
15.	"Aaj Sugandha"		Rahul Deshpande	4:19
16.	"Ghei Chand Makarand"		Rahul Deshpande	5:44
17.	"Ram Ram Lori - Female"	Mangesh Kangane	Shreya Ghoshal	4:15
18.	"Paravashta Pash Daive"		Anand Bhate	1:39
19.	"Vitari Prakhar"		Anand Bhate	1:33
20.	"Yuvati Mana"		Anand Bhate	1:52
21.	"Malini Kanwahi"		Rahul Deshpande	2:05
22.	"Jan Saare Majla"		Rahul Deshpande	1:43
Total length:				1:20:46

== Reception ==
=== Critical reception ===
Kalpeshraj Kubal of The Times of India gave the film 4.5 out of five stars saying, "An unmissable journey of a legend".

== Awards ==
At 68th National Film Awards, Rahul Deshpande was awarded as the Best Male Playback Singer

The film also won the National Film Award for Best Audiography (Sound Designer) for Anmol Bhave.

At the 7th Filmfare Awards Marathi, Me Vasantrao had 15 nominations and won the most awards of the night including 7 Awards.

Best Film Critics - Nipun Dharmadhikari.

Best Playback Singer – Male - Rahul Deshpande.

Best Supporting Actress - Anita Date Kelkar.

Best Lyricist Vaibhav Joshi for "Kaivalyagaan" – Me Vasantrao

- 58th Maharashtra state film awards

Best actor: Rahul Deshpande - winner

Best music: Rahul Deshpande - winner

Best playback singer male: Rahul Deshpande - winner

At the Sakal Premier Awards Nipun Dharmadhikari Won best Director award.
