= Chandrakant Limaye =

Hindustani classical singer

- Born: 19 August 1950
- Died: 31 May 2026 (aged 75)
- Citizenship: Indian
- Occupation: Hindustani Classical Vocalist
- Years active: 1970s-2026

Pandit Chandrakant Limaye (चंद्रकांत लिमये) (19 August 1950 - 31 May 2026) was a Hindustani Classical Singer from India, and the successor disciple of the well known vocalist Late Dr.Vasantrao Deshpande.

Chandrakant Limaye was also famous for his participation in Marathi Musical Plays.

- Katyar Kaljat Ghusali of Natyasampada, Bombay. This became an extremely popular play where, after Pt Vasantrao Deshpande, Limaye used to play the lead role.
- Vardanof Sharayu Theatre.
- Sant Gora Kumbhar of Vaishali Theatre and Natya Sampada.
- Sangeet Saubhadra of Rang Sharada.
- To Mi Nawhech of Natya Sampada.
- Sangeet Sanshayakallol of Sahakari Manoranjan.He played the lead role and his character was named as Ashwin Sheth in the play which was earlier played by chhote Gandharva
- Pat Gele Ga Kathewadi of Natya Sampada.
- Makhamali He Swapna Maze of Ranjan Kala Mandir.

Limaye used to perform the lead role in a Marathi musical play Katyar Kaljat Ghusli written by Purushottam Darvhekar since April 1997. The same role was earlier performed by his Guru Late Pt. Vasantrao Deshpande.

In 2003, Maharashtra Kala Niketan honoured Chandrakant Limaye by giving the Maharashtra Vaibhav award for performing in the lead role in Katyar Kaljat Ghusali produced by Natyasampada Mumbai, that belongs to Prabhakar Panshikar.

Vasantrao Deshpande Sangeet Sabha, a charitable trust was founded by Chandrakant Limaye in August 2000. On behalf of Vasantrao Deshpande Sangeet Sabha, he started several theme-based programmes such as Hori Ke Rang, Shrutirang Varsha ke, Natyarang Sangeetache, Haweli Sangeet, and Gharanon Ki Khasiyatein.
