= Vitthala Shappath =

- Vitthala Shappath Official Poster
- Directed by: Chandrakant Pawar
- Screenplay by: Chandrakant Pawar
- Story by: Chandrakant Pawar
- Produced by: Gurudarshan Films, Pahal Productions LLP
- Starring: Vijay Sairaj; Krutika Gaikwad; Mangesh Desai; Anuradha Rajadhyaksha; Sanjay Khapre; Vidyadhar Joshi; Uday Sabnis; Anshuman Vichare; Ketan Pawar; Rajesh Bhosale; Pranav Raorane
- Cinematography: Sandy
- Edited by: Ashish Mhatre, Apurva Motiwale Sahai
- Music by: Chinar-Mahesh
- Release date: 15 September 2017
- Country: India
- Language: Marathi

Vitthala Shappath (Marathi: विठ्ठला शप्पथ) is a 2017 film about the love story of a young boy named "Krishna", who is from a middle class family living in a rural area. Vitthala Shappath is about promise and commitment. The film is releasing on 15 September 2017.

== Plot ==
Krishna is the son of his parents but he forgets the main object of life. He enjoys his own way by disobeying the guidelines of his parents, who are devotees of Lord Vitthala. Krishna goes on the wrong path and as a result, he faces a drastic problem and after realizing his mistakes, he overcomes his bad nature. He started to fulfill the motive of his father and Naina helps him in his work. During the period, Krishna and Naina fall in love with each other. At one instance, a situation came before him that he has to choose one out of two things, one is motive of his father and second is Naina's love. What he will choose? Vijay is the hero.

== Track listing ==
No.	Title	Lyrics	Music	Singer(s)	Length
01	"Tunna Tunna"	Kshitij Patwardhan	Chinar - Mahesh	Swapnil Bandodkar & Anandi Joshi	3:04
02	"Jhakkas Chokra"	Mangesh Kangane	Chinar - Mahesh	Pravin Kunwar	3:11
03	"Thai Thai Majhi Vithai"	Mangesh Kangane	Chinar - Mahesh	Rahul Deshpande	3:58
04	Dev Kondala	Mangesh Kangane	Chinar - Mahesh	Adarsh Shinde	3:01
