= Charudatta Aphale =

Indian kirtan performer

- Born: 3 June 1967 (age 59); India
- Occupations: Kirtan, Natya Artist
- Known for: Gandhi, Sawarkar Kirtan, Sangit Nataka's
- Parent: Govindswami Aphale
- Website: https://www.charudattaaphale.com

Charudatta Aphale (born early 1960s) is a kirtan performer, son of kirtan performer Govindswami Aphale. Govindswami was often referred to Aphale-buwa when he was active. And now Charudatta is referred to as Aphale-buwa, with Buwa being an honorific term. Aphale took his kirtan lessons from his parents and Pt. Sharad Gokhale, Pt. Padmakar Kulkarni, Mukundbuva Gokhale, Agashe Buva, Madhukar Khadilkar, Pt. Vijay Bakshi

== Career as actor in Sangeet Natak ==
He started acting in Marathi Sangit Nataks (musical plays) right from his school days. He has acted in several plays like Katyar Kaljat Ghusali, Shakuntal, Saubhadra, Sanshay Kallol, Matsyagandha, Lavani Bhulali Abhangala, Atun Kirtan varun Tamasha, Ithe Oshalala Mrutyu, To Mi Navhech etc.

== Family of Keertan-kaar-s ==
Charudatta Aphale completed B.A. with Marathi language as the principal subject; later he chose music as the main subject for his M.A. Charudatta Aphale's father, Govindswami Aphale, was among the foremost keertankaars of his day from 1950s to 1980s. Aphale has carried forward his family's tradition of Kirtan (a form of narration which combines spiritual and social messages with music). He has performed more than 5000 kirtans in 25 years. His kirtan performances have taken place not only in Maharashtra, but also in other states of India and even in U.S.A., Canada and Australia etc. He has also performed on several television and channels. His sister, Krantigeeta Mahabal, is also a noted keertan performer.

Charudatta Aphale's kirtans include topics like freedom fighters, religious kirtans, and kirtans on saints. This includes, Vasudev Balwant Phadke, Chaphekar Brothers, Rani Laxmibai, Netaji Subhashchandra Bose, Bhagat Singh, Shivaji, Sambhaji, Bajirao I etc.

Aphale also educates young students about historic tales and especially anecdotes from the lives of Marathi saints.

== Plays ==
Plays - सादर केलेली नाटके	Character - भूमिका
Katyar kaljat Ghusali कट्यार काळजात घुसली	Young Sadashiv/Chand/ Sadashiv, Khan Saheb छोटा सदाशिव/ चांद/ सदाशिव/ खा साहेब
Shakuntal शाकुंतल	King Dushyant राजा दुष्यंत
Soubhadra सौभद्र	Narad/Arjun/Krishna नारद/ अर्जुन/ कृष्ण
Sanshaykallol संशयकल्लोळ	Ashwin Seth अश्विन शेट
Manapman मानापमान	Dhairyadhar धैर्यधर
Kanhopatra कान्होपात्रा	Sant Chokhamela संत चोखामेळा
Vidyaharan विद्याहरण	Devguru Kach देवगुरु कच
Machygandha मत्स्यगंधा	Parashar पराशर
Lavani Bhulali Abhangala लावणी भुलली अभंगाला	Sant Nilobaray संत निळोबाराय
Aatun kirtan varun tamasha आतून कीर्तन वरून तमाशा	Haridasbuva हरिदासबुवा
Ithe Oshalala Mrutyu ईथे ओशाळला मृत्यू	Santaji संताजी
TO Mi Navhech तो मी नव्हेच	Gayak Buva गायक बुवा

== Awards ==
He has been honoured with many awards, these include

1. Patankar award of Pune Marathi Granthalay
2. Gold Medal of Goa Mashel group
3. Paluskar award of Akhil Bharatiya Natya Parishad
4. Pune Ki Asha award 2002
5. Dinanath Mangeshkar award 2003, received at the hands of the chief minister of Maharashtra.
6. Balgandarv Gungaurav Puraskar
