= Rahul Deshpande =

Indian classical singer (born 1979)

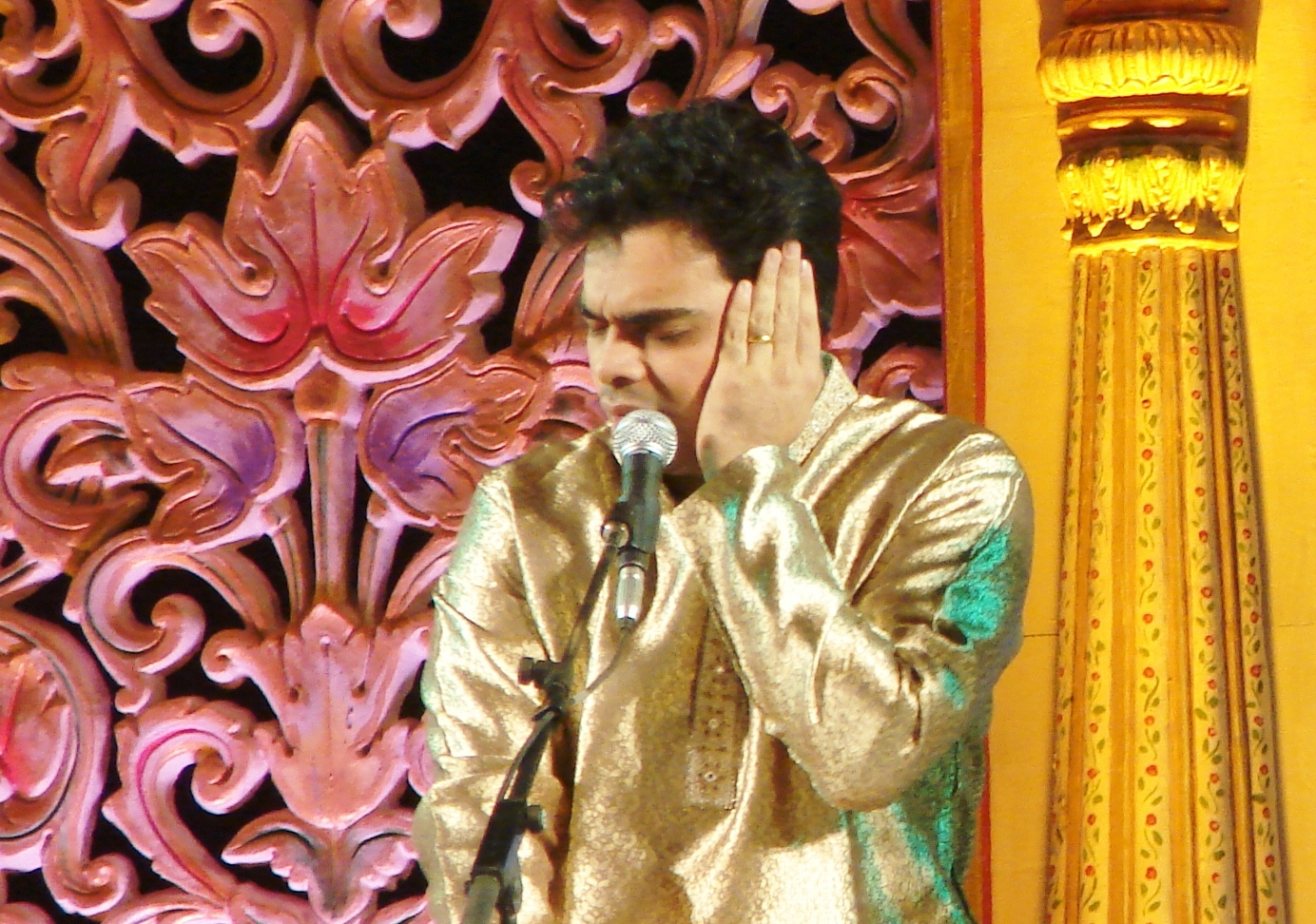
- Deshpande singing in Vasantotsav in 2010

Background information
- Born: 10 October 1979 (age 47); Pune, Maharashtra, India
- Genre: Hindustani classical music
- Occupations: Singer
- Years active: 1984–present
- Spouse: Neha (2007-div. 2024)
- Website: www.rahuldeshpande.com

Rahul Deshpande (born 10 October 1979) is an Indian classical music singer and actor. He is the recipient of a National Film Award, Filmfare Awards Marathi And Maharashtra State Film Awards for his work in Me Vasantrao. He is the grandson of Vasantrao Deshpande.

== Early life ==
Rahul Deshpande was born on 10 October 1979 in Pune, Maharashtra.

== Education and career ==
Rahul developed his interest in vocal music by studying the music of Kumar Gandharva. Initially, he sought guidance of Pandit Gangadharbuva Pimpalkhare and Dr. Madhusudhan Patwardhan. He further learnt under the tutelage of Smt. Ushatai Chipalkatti and Pandit Mukul Shivputra. He also learned the tabla from Pandit Suresh Samant. His repertoire includes khayal, tap khayal, dhruvpad, Thumri, kajri, hori, Tappa, Ghazal, Abhang, Bhajan, Natak Sangeet and bhavgeet. Rahul has judged Zee Marathi's popular reality TV show "Sa Re Ga Ma Pa Marathi Li'l Champs" and Zee Yuva's "Sangeet Samrat". His work in the re-opening of the musical play which originally starred his grandfather Katyar Kaljat Ghusali was tremendous. He was the playback singer for the songs of "Khansaheb Aftab Hussain Bareliwale", played by Sachin Pilgaonkar in the film. The role was played by Rahul himself in the play Katyar Kaljat Ghusali.

Every year he arranges "Vasantotsav" in the memory of his late grandfather Vasantrao Deshpande.

A revised version of Kakasaheb Khadilkar's Sangeet Maanapmaan played in Maharashtra in 2011 and 2012, the centenary year of the play's first performance. It has been revised by Rahul Deshpande. "Originally, the play has five parts with around 52 classical songs. Deshpande's version will have two parts and 22 classical songs."

== Personal life ==
In September 2024, Rahul and his wife Neha legally separated after 17 years of marriage. They have a daughter, Renuka, and continue to co-parent her while maintaining a respectful relationship.

=== Stage appearances ===
- Katyar Kaljat Ghusali
- Sangeet Sanshaykallol
- "Sangeet Manapman"
- "Sangeet Saubhadra"

== Discography ==
Year	Film	Song	Composer	Notes
2011	Balgandharva	"Ravi Mi"	Govindrao Tembe	
2011	Morya	"Dev Chorla Slow Version"	Avadhoot Gupte	
2012	Satrangi Re	"Door Rahile Gaav"	Ajay Naik	
2015	Katyar Kaljat Ghusali	"Dil Ki Tapish"	Shankar–Ehsaan–Loy	
2015	Katyar Kaljat Ghusali	"Ghei Chhand Makarand"	Shankar–Ehsaan–Loy	
2015	Katyar Kaljat Ghusali	"Sur Se Saji"	Shankar–Ehsaan–Loy	
2015	Katyar Kaljat Ghusali	"Surat Piya Ki"	Shankar–Ehsaan–Loy	
2017	Vitthala Shappath	"Thai Thai Majhi Vithai"	Chinar-Mahesh	
2017	Hampi	"Apanehi Rang Mein"	Narendra Bhide	
2018	Pushpak Vimaan	"Deh Pandurang"	Narendra Bhide	
2018	Pushpak Vimaan	"Anandache Dohi"	Narendra Bhide	
2019	Bhai: Vyakti Ki Valli	"Kanada Raja Pandharicha"	Ajit Parab	
2019	Bhai: Vyakti Ki Valli 2	"Kumar Savare"	Ajit Parab	
2019	Anandi Gopal	"Tu Aahes Na"	Jasraj-Saurabh-Rishikesh	
2021	Free Hit Danka	"Ha Rang Chadhu De"	Baban Adgale & Ashok Kamble	
2021	Tamasha Live	"Chitrapatachi Nandi"	Pankaj Padghan	
2021	Godavari	"Khal Khal Goda"	AV Prafullachandra	Maharashtra State Film Award for Best Male Playback Singer
2022	Me Vasantrao	"Kaivalyagaan"	Rahul Deshpande	National Film Award for Best Male Playback Singer
2022	Me Vasantrao	"Tere Dar Se"	Rahul Deshpande	
2022	Me Vasantrao	"Punav Raticha"	Rahul Deshpande	
2022	Me Vasantrao	"Ram Ram Lori"	Rahul Deshpande	
2022	Me Vasantrao	"Vitthala Darshan Deun Ja"	Rahul Deshpande	Maharashtra State Film Award for Best Male Playback Singer
2022	Me Vasantrao	"Main Patiya"	Rahul Deshpande	
2022	Me Vasantrao	"Lalan"	Rahul Deshpande	
2022	Me Vasantrao	"Pavan Chalat"	Rahul Deshpande	
2022	Me Vasantrao	"Le Chali Taqdeer"	Rahul Deshpande	
2022	Me Vasantrao	"Radhadhar Madhu Milind"	Rahul Deshpande	
2022	Me Vasantrao	"Aaj Sugandha"	Rahul Deshpande	
2022	Me Vasantrao	"Ghei Chhand Makarand"	Rahul Deshpande	
2022	Me Vasantrao	"Malini Kanwahi"	Rahul Deshpande	
2022	Me Vasantrao	"Jan Saare Majla"	Rahul Deshpande	
2024	Amaltash	"You Liberate Me"	Rahul Deshpande	
2024	Phullwanti	"Hey Sharade"	Avinash–Vishwajeet	
2024	Phullwanti	"Bho Shambho"	Avinash–Vishwajeet	
2024	Gulabi	"Safar"	Sai-Piyush	
2025	Sangeet Manapmaan	"Vandan Ho"	Shankar–Ehsaan–Loy	
2026	Tula Pahata	"Tula Pahta Title Track - Male Version"	Rohan-Rohan	
2026	Aadi Anant	"Digambara Digambara"	Avinash–Vishwajeet	

== Achievements and recognition ==
- Rasikagrani Dattopant Deshpande Award, presented to him at the Sawai Gandharva Bhimsen Festival.
- Master Dinanath Mangeshkar Award by Lata Mangeshkar. (2012)
- Kothrud Bhushan Award by then Chief Minister of Maharashtra, Devendra Fadnavis.
- Sudhir Phadke Award for his outstanding achievements at a young age.
- Special Jury Award Best Singers in Zee Chitr Gaurav 2016.
- National Film Award for Best Male Playback Singer for Me Vasantrao (2022)
- Fakt Marathi Cine Sanman for Best Music Director for "Punav Raticha" – Me Vasantrao (2022)
- Pravah Picture Awards for Best Male Playback Singer for the song "Khal Khal Goda" from Godavari (2022)
- Mata Sanman for Best Male Playback Singer for Me Vasantrao (2023)
- Zee Chitra Gaurav Puraskar for Best Male Playback Singer for the song "Khal Khal Goda" from Godavari (2023)
- Filmfare Awards Marathi for Best Male Playback Singer for the song "Kaivalyagaan" from Me Vasantrao (2023)
- Sakal Premier Awards for Best Music Direction for Me Vasantrao (2023)
- Navarashtra Planet Marathi Film & OTT Awards for Best Male Playback Singer for the song "Kaivalyagaan" from Me Vasantrao (2023)
- 68th Maharashtra State Film Awards for Best Actor for Me Vasantrao (2024)
- 68th Maharashtra State Film Awards for Best Music Director for the song "Vitthala Darshan Deun Jaa" from Me Vasantrao (2024)
- 68th Maharashtra State Film Awards for Best Male Playback Singer for the song "Vitthala Darshan Deun Jaa" from Me Vasantrao (2024)
- 69th Maharashtra State Film Awards for Best Male Playback Singer for the song "Khal Khal Goda" from Godavari (2024)
- Zee Chitra Gaurav Puraskar for Best Playback Singer – Male for Amaltash (2025)
