= Vijay Koparkar =

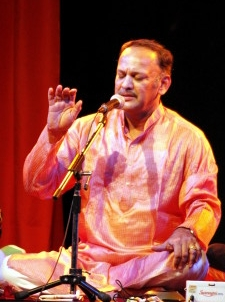

Background information
- Born: Vidyadhar Koparkar
- Origin: Pune, Maharashtra, India
- Genres: Hindustani classical music, Thumri, Natya Sangeet
- Occupation: Indian Classical Vocalist

Vidyadhar Koparkar (born 1962) is a Hindustani classical singer. He himself is a guru and is a disciple of Pt. Dr. Vasantrao Deshpande and Pt. Jitendra Abhisheki. He sings khyal, tarana, thumri, tappa, dadra, bhajan, abhang and natyageet among other genres.

== Early life and education ==
Vijay Koparkar hails from Pune. His father, Gangadharbuwa Koparkar was a renowned Kirtankar. He had a brother who was a successful dermatologist. Koparkar attended the Maharashtra education societies, Perugate Bhave school. Later he obtained a master's degree in Engineering (Metallurgy) from the College of Engineering, Pune and runs a small-scale manufacturing plant.

He started his musical training at the age of eight. His first musical Guru (teacher) for eight years was Madhusudan Patwardhan and Sudhatai Patwardhan. This was followed by training under renowned artist of yesteryear, Vasantrao Deshpande for five years and then under Pandit Jitendra Abhisheki for seven years. He has learnt from other vocalists, such as Balasaheb Poochwale.

== Career ==
Vijay Koparkar has been trained by gurus belonging to different gharanas (schools of music), and it reflects in his singing. He has received several honors including a scholarship given by Master Sudhir Phadke Through ‘Surashree Pratishthan’ for six years from 1983 to 1990 and the ‘Pandit Ramkrishna Vaze Puraskar’ by Gandharva Mahamandal.

Vijay Koparkar has performed all over the world, including the US, Canada, the Middle East, Paris and UK. He performed four times at the prestigious ‘Sawai Gandharva Music Festival’ held in Pune, India every year.

He is a graded artist at All India Radio and Indian Television.

He is most often accompanied by Shri Rahul Gole on harmonium and Shri Vivek Bhalerao on Tabla. His son Tejas and disciple Mandar Gadgil are often seen accompanying him on tanpura.

== Students ==
Vijay Koparkar has been imparting music lessons for many years. Among his students are vocalists, Senior Disciples Saurabh Deshpande, Lalit Deshpande, Ishwar Ghorpade, Mandar Gadgil, Mandar Phatak, Hrishikesh Ranade, Prajakta Ranade, Preeti Tamhankar and Shruti Bujarburuah son Tejas and daughter Shruti.

== Discography ==
Alurkar Music House, Pune has released 5 cassettes of Pandit Vijay Koparkar. His albums have been released, including Jog Do Din Ka Mela, in which Kaushiki Chakraborty and Vijay Koparkar have sung 8 songs in total. It is available on Spotify and other music streaming platforms.

In the Vi.Vi.Da. Smruti Sangeet Samaroh 2018 held at Gandharva Mahavidyalaya, Pune, he stated that he has never sung on television and had turned down a few offers for the same.

He has expertise in Khyal form of vocalization, especially jod-ragas (ragas that are a mixture of independently existing ragas) like Jogkauns, Basant Mukhari and Rageshree-Kauns to name a few.

He has impeccable command over forms of semi-classical music like thumri, dadra and especially tappa.

He greatly enjoys singing Raga Kirwani.

He has exceptional command over Raga Bhairavi among others and sings many bandishes including rare bandishes like 'Udho Hi Jaa' in Taal Jhumra, and other bandishes including bhajans (Shiv Ke Man Sharan Ho), thumri, dadra and tappa (Najar di bahar).

His renditions of various ragas are available on his YouTube Channel, and Tablist Vivek Bhalerao's YouTube Channel.
