= Godavari (2021 film) =

Indian Marathi-language drama film

- VIFF premiere poster
- Directed by: Nikhil Mahajan
- Written by: Prajakt Deshmukh; Nikhil Mahajan
- Produced by: Jitendra Joshi; Mitali Joshi; Pavan Malu; Nikhil Mahajan
- Starring: Neena Kulkarni; Jitendra Joshi; Vikram Gokhale
- Cinematography: Shamin Kulkarni
- Edited by: Hrishikesh Petwe
- Music by: AV Prafullachandra
- Production companies: Blue Drop Films; Jitendra Joshi Pictures
- Distributed by: Jio Studios
- Release dates: 4 October 2021 (VIFF); 11 November 2022 (India)
- Running time: 169 min
- Country: India
- Language: Marathi

Godavari is an Indian Marathi-language drama film directed by Nikhil Mahajan and produced by Jitendra Joshi, Mitali Joshi, Pavan Malu and Nikhil Mahajan under the banner of Blue Drop Films. Starring Jitendra Joshi in lead role along with Neena Kulkarni, Sanjay Mone, Vikram Gokhale and Gauri Nalawade in pivotal roles. The film tells a story of a family living on the banks of river Godavari in Nashik.

It had its world premiere at 2021 Vancouver International Film Festival on 4 October 2021, and was released theatrically on 11 November 2022. The film received positive reviews from critics and audiences upon release. At the 69th National Film Awards, Godavari won an award for Best Direction. At 7th Filmfare Awards Marathi, the film received a 12 nominations, Best Actor (Joshi) and Best Supporting Actor (Jadhav), and won a leading 5 awards, including Best Film, Best Director (Mahajan) and Best Actor Critics (Joshi).

== Cast ==
- Neena Kulkarni as Nishikant's mother
- Jitendra Joshi as Nishikant Deshmukh
- Sanjay Mone as Nishikant's father
- Vikram Gokhale as Nishikant's grandfather
- Gauri Nalawade as Gautami, Nishikant's wife
- Saniya Bhandare as Sarita, Nishikant's daughter
- Priyadarshan Jadhav as Keshav
- Ameet Dograa
- Pavan Malu
- Sakhi Gokhale as Nishikant's Sister
- Mohit Takalkar as The Balloon Man

== Release ==
Godavari was initially slated to release on May 1, 2021, commemorating Maharashtra Day, but was postponed due to COVID-19 pandemic. It was invited at 2021 Vancouver International Film Festival in 'Contemporary World Cinema' section of festival program. It had its world premiere on 4 October 2021, and its theatrical release in India was scheduled on 3 December 2021.

The film was also invited at the New Zealand International Film Festival for its Wellington edition to be screened on 10 November 2021, and at 52nd International Film Festival of India in the film category of 'Indian Panorama' section for screening in November. It was also selected for Golden Peacock Awards category. Later in March 2022, it was screened at Pune International Film Festival, where it won Best Director award, Best Cinematography award and Best Music Special Jury Prize. The film was also selected as opening film at 22nd edition of New York Indian Film Festival screened on 7 May 2022. The film was also screened at Cannes Film Festival in Marché du Film held along 2022 edition of the festival on 19 May at Palais des Festivals. It was released theatrically on 11 November 2022 after delays.

== Reception ==
Charlie Smith of The Georgia Straight reviewing the film at VIFF praised the music saying "Indian songs, amplify the misery of Nishikant's existence", and cinematography, writing, "Imaginative camera work also does its magic." Smith also appreciated the performances of cast and said, "The acting in Godavari is first-rate". He praised the acting of Jitendra Joshi for his portrayal of "fiery-eyed the troubled Nishikant", Priyadarshan Jadhav for his "pensive and plaintive performance", and Neena Kulkarni for her "subtle and authentic acting". He concluded, "This is Marathi arthouse cinema at its best."

Mihir Bhange, writing for The Times of India, praised the movie stating that "It’s an audio-visual experience fit for the big screen". He also called it, "one of the finest films to have been made in Marathi cinema in recent times".

== Awards and nominations ==
Year	Award ceremony	Category	Recipient/ Nominee(s)	Result	Ref.
2021	52nd International Film Festival of India	IFFI Best Actor Award (Male)	Jitendra Joshi	Won	
2021	52nd International Film Festival of India	Special Jury Award	Nikhil Mahajan	Won	
2022	Pune International Film Festival	Best Director	Nikhil Mahajan	Won	
2022	Pune International Film Festival	Best Cinematography	Shamin Kulkarni	Won	
2022	Pune International Film Festival	Best Music Special Jury Prize	AV Prafullachandra	Won	
2022	New York Indian Film Festival	Best Actor	Jitendra Joshi	Won	
2022	Pravah Picture Awards	Best Supporting Actor	Priyadarshan Jadhav	Won	
2022	Pravah Picture Awards	Best Playback Singer – Male	Rahul Deshpande – "Khal Khal Goda"	Won	
2022	Pravah Picture Awards	Best Story	Nikhil Mahajan, Prajakt Deshmukh	Won	
2022	Pravah Picture Awards	Best Sound Designer	Baylon Fonseca	Won	
2022	Pravah Picture Awards	Best Background Score	AV Prafullachandra	Won	
2023	Zee Chitra Gaurav Puraskar	Best Film	Godavari	Nominated	
2023	Zee Chitra Gaurav Puraskar	Best Director	Nikhil Mahajan	Nominated	
2023	Zee Chitra Gaurav Puraskar	Best Actor	Jitendra Joshi	Nominated	
2023	Zee Chitra Gaurav Puraskar	Best Supporting Actor	Sanjay Mone	Nominated	
2023	Zee Chitra Gaurav Puraskar	Best Supporting Actress	Gauri Nalawade	Won	
2023	Zee Chitra Gaurav Puraskar	Best Child Actor	Saniya Bhandare	Nominated	
2023	Zee Chitra Gaurav Puraskar	Best Playback Singer – Male	Rahul Deshpande – "Khal Khal Goda"	Won	
2023	Zee Chitra Gaurav Puraskar	Best Lyricist	Jitendra Joshi – "Khal Khal Goda"	Won	
2023	Zee Chitra Gaurav Puraskar	Best Story	Nikhil Mahajan, Prajakt Deshmukh	Nominated	
2023	Zee Chitra Gaurav Puraskar	Best Screenplay	Nikhil Mahajan, Prajakt Deshmukh	Nominated	
2023	Zee Chitra Gaurav Puraskar	Best Dialogue	Prajakt Deshmukh	Won	
2023	Zee Chitra Gaurav Puraskar	Best Sound Recording	Baylon Fonseca	Nominated	
2023	Zee Chitra Gaurav Puraskar	Best Background Score	AV Prafullachandra	Won	
2023	Zee Chitra Gaurav Puraskar	Best Art Director	Amit Waghchaure	Nominated	
2023	Zee Chitra Gaurav Puraskar	Best Cinematography	Shamin Kulkarni	Won	
2023	National Film Awards	Best Direction	Nikhil Mahajan	Won	
2023	Filmfare Marathi Awards	Best Film	Godavari	Won	
2023	Filmfare Marathi Awards	Best Film Critics	Nikhil Mahajan	Nominated	
2023	Filmfare Marathi Awards	Best Director	Nikhil Mahajan	Won	
2023	Filmfare Marathi Awards	Best Actor	Jitendra Joshi	Nominated	
2023	Filmfare Marathi Awards	Best Actor Critics	Jitendra Joshi	Won	
2023	Filmfare Marathi Awards	Best Supporting Actor	Priyadarshan Jadhav	Nominated	
2023	Filmfare Marathi Awards	Best Lyricist	Jitendra Joshi – "Khal Khal Goda"	Nominated	
2023	Filmfare Marathi Awards	Best Playback Singer – Male	Rahul Deshpande – "Khal Khal Goda"	Nominated	
2023	Filmfare Marathi Awards	Best Story	Nikhil Mahajan, Prajakt Deshmukh	Nominated	
2023	Filmfare Marathi Awards	Best Screenplay	Nikhil Mahajan, Prajakt Deshmukh	Won	
2023	Filmfare Marathi Awards	Best Dialogue	Prajakt Deshmukh	Nominated	
2023	Filmfare Marathi Awards	Best Cinematography	Shamin Kulkarni	Nominated	
2023	Filmfare Marathi Awards	Best Sound Design	Baylon Fonseca	Nominated	
2023	Filmfare Marathi Awards	Best Background Score	A V Prafullchandra	Won	
2023	Fakt Marathi Cine Sanman	Best Playback Singer Male	Shreyas Puranik – "Kojagiri"	Nominated	
2023	Fakt Marathi Cine Sanman	Best Lyricist	Jitendra Joshi – "Khal Khal Goda"	Nominated	
2023	Fakt Marathi Cine Sanman	Special Award – National Film Awards winner for Best Direction	Nikhil Mahajan	Won	
2023	TV9 Aapla Bioscope Awards	Best Film	Godavari	Nominated	
2023	TV9 Aapla Bioscope Awards	Best Director	Nikhil Mahajan	Nominated	
2023	TV9 Aapla Bioscope Awards	Best Director (Jury)	Nikhil Mahajan	Won	
2023	TV9 Aapla Bioscope Awards	Best Actor in a Lead Role	Jitendra Joshi	Nominated	
2023	TV9 Aapla Bioscope Awards	Best Actor in a Lead Role (Jury)	Jitendra Joshi	Won	
2023	TV9 Aapla Bioscope Awards	Best Actor in a Supporting Role	Priyadarshan Jadhav	Nominated	
