= Ranju Varghese =

Indian choreographer and director (born 1984)

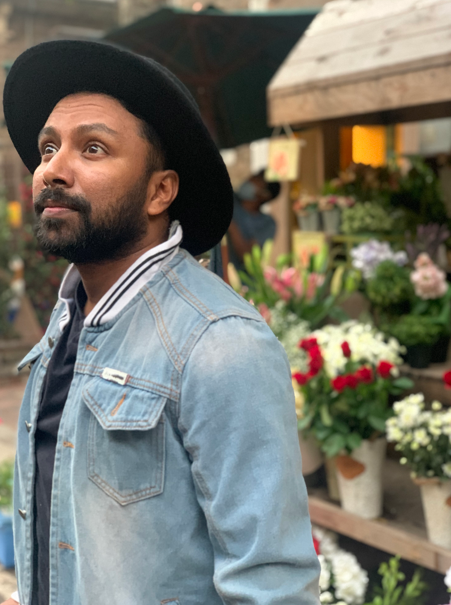
- Born: 1 January 1984 (age 42); Mumbai, Maharashtra
- Occupations: Choreographer, Director
- Spouse: Kadambari Ranju Varghese
- Children: Diorr Varghese

Ranju Varghese (born 1 January 1984) is an Indian song director and choreographer based in Bollywood. He is known for directing, designing, conceptualizing, and choreographing over 200 projects, including songs for movies, music videos, and ad films.

== Career ==
Before establishing himself as an independent choreographer and director, Varghese served as a chief assistant choreographer for the renowned choreographer duo Bosco and Caesar for a decade. He has since directed, designed, conceptualized, and choreographed numerous songs for Bollywood movies such as Adipurush, Tanhaji: The Unsung Warrior, Kisi Ka Bhai Kisi Ki Jaan, Total Dhamaal, and many more.

== Works and filmography ==
Film Songs
[I] Film
Raid 2
Maa
Sajna
Dashmi
Kisi ka Bhai Kisi ki Jaan
Aadipurush
Three Cheers - Maka Naka
Zombivli
Dhokha
Coolie No.1 [Tujhe apna maanu]
The Big Bull
Jai Mummy Di
Tanhaji The unsung Warrior
Total Dhamaal
Blank: Ali Ali Song
Helicopter Eela [All Songs]
Mauli
One day
Body: Aaina
Bypass Road
Bablu Bachelor
Meri pyaari Bindu (Maana - the film version & Meri Pyaari Bindu - Proposal sequence) (YRF films)
Kya Kool Hain Hum 3
Fuddu (promotional track with Sunny Leone and Sharman Joshi)
Firrkiee:
Jack n Dill
3 DEV
Yaar Bandooka (for Eros)
Sangharsh (Gheun tak)
Bhutaacha Honeymoon
Married to America (Rabba Re)
Officer

== Music videos and promos ==
Music Videos & Promos
Title	Role
Tere Ho Jaaye [Zee Music]	DIRECTOR & PRODUCER
Dua Kijiye [Tips Music]	DIRECTOR & PRODUCER
Apne Pyar Ke Sapne	DIRECTOR & PRODUCER
Ishq Ka Asar	DIRECTOR & PRODUCER
Bohot Pyaar Karte hai	DIRECTOR & PRODUCER
Teri Bewafai [Zee Music]	DIRECTOR & PRODUCER
Teri Yaadein	DIRECTOR & PRODUCER
Tu Mujhse Juda [Zee Music]	DIRECTOR & PRODUCER
Har Haal mein [Zee Music]	DIRECTOR & PRODUCER
Blockbuster	DIRECTOR
Hisaab [Zee Music]	DIRECTOR & PRODUCER
Kaale Kaale Chashmein [Zee Music]	DIRECTOR & PRODUCER
Mubarak [Zee Music]	DIRECTOR & PRODUCER
Dheere Dheere tumse [Zee Music]	DIRECTOR
Aashik hoon [Zee Music]	DIRECTOR
Dil Se Mere Utar Gaye (Directed & Choreographed) [Zee Music]	DIRECTOR
Jaa Rahe Ho (Directed & Choreographed) for Sa Re Ga Ma Music	DIRECTOR & PRODUCER
Buhebaariya (Directed & Choreographed) for Sa Re Ga Ma Music	DIRECTOR & PRODUCER
Tu baithe mere saamne (Directed & Choreographed) [Zee Music]	DIRECTOR
Devotional music videos (Directed & Choreographed) [Zee Music]	DIRECTOR
Humko toh Pyaar Ho Gaya (Directed & Choreographed)	DIRECTOR
Aankhon ki Taalim (Directed & Choreographed) (*ing Rajneeish Duggal)	DIRECTOR & PRODUCER
Neendo se Breakup (Directed & Choreographed) for Meet Bros.	DIRECTOR
Celebrate India (Directed & Choreographed)	DIRECTOR & PRODUCER
Saiyyoni tere pyaar mein [Tips Music]	CHOREOGRAPHER
Sazaa [for Tips Music]	CHOREOGRAPHER
Tere Do Naina	CHOREOGRAPHER
Yeh galiyan yeh choubara	CHOREOGRAPHER
Get Dirty	CHOREOGRAPHER
Zaroori Hai	DIRECTOR
Zaroori Hai feat Papon	DIRECTOR
Teri Maa	CHOREOGRAPHER
Neel Samandar	CHOREOGRAPHER
Music Video for JBL speakers	CHOREOGRAPHER
Music Video For All of Me Baarish	CHOREOGRAPHER
Music Video for Mr. Sonu Nigam [Aa bhio jaa tu]	CHOREOGRAPHER
Music Video for Colgate Maxfresh	CHOREOGRAPHER
Ek vaari: T series music video (feat Aayushmaan Khurana)	CHOREOGRAPHER
Halka HaLka : T series music video (feat Raahat Fateh Ali Khan)	CHOREOGRAPHER
Music Video for Galiyaan	CHOREOGRAPHER
National Anthem for Mardaani	CHOREOGRAPHER
Music Video for MTV for Actor Diljit Dosanjh 'Singh is Stylish'	CHOREOGRAPHER
Music Video for International Pop Artist 'Mumzy Stranger' & 'Tasha tah' [Kurbaan]	DIRECTOR
Music Video Challa for Mtv nokia music factory	CHOREOGRAPHER
Promotional Video for MTV show called 'Kaisi Yeh Yaariyan'	CHOREOGRAPHER
Campus Diaries anthem ( feat Raftaar and Manj)	CHOREOGRAPHER
Promos for Bipasha Basu's 'Unleash' & 'Breakfree' DVD's	CHOREOGRAPHER
Tera Intezaar for Director Vishal Chaturvedi	CHOREOGRAPHER
Magnet	CHOREOGRAPHER
Punjabiya de Gall	CHOREOGRAPHER
Humsafar	CHOREOGRAPHER

== Ad films ==
Ad Films
Title	Role
Ghadi detergent (2023)	CHOREOGRAPHER
Ghadi Detergent holi (Directed)	DIRECTOR
ad for dada diya n all	CHOREOGRAPHER
Ghadi Detergent	CHOREOGRAPHER
Glori Handwash [CO - Directed with Dir Pradeep Sarkar]	ASSOCIATE DIRECTOR
Nestle Ceregrow : Badhna jaari hai [Lockdown Commercial]	ASSOCIATE DIRECTOR
Glory soap	CHOREOGRAPHER
Corona warrior ko salaam	CHOREOGRAPHER
Gold loan commercial with Amit ji [Muthooth]	CHOREOGRAPHER
Ad films with Paritosh [Ujjeevan]	CHOREOGRAPHER
Jio Football Campaign	CHOREOGRAPHER
IPL Jio Dhan Dhana Dhan Campaign	CHOREOGRAPHER
Coca-Cola commercial	CHOREOGRAPHER
Muthoot Finance 1	CHOREOGRAPHER
Muthoot Finance 2	CHOREOGRAPHER
Dish Savaar Hai (Dish Avatar)	CHOREOGRAPHER
Sahara Commercial	CHOREOGRAPHER
Sahara insurance commercial	CHOREOGRAPHER
Celebrate Goodness (Directed and Choreographed for Govt of India)	CHOREOGRAPHER
Snapdeal.com Commercial	CHOREOGRAPHER
Idea – Ullu banaaving series	CHOREOGRAPHER
Dabur Vatika Shampoo – Hair Dance	CHOREOGRAPHER
Wee Store'	CHOREOGRAPHER
Arise TV	CHOREOGRAPHER
Tata Shakti	CHOREOGRAPHER
Dabur Vaatika Commercial	CHOREOGRAPHER
Colgate Maxfresh 2	CHOREOGRAPHER
Yippee Noodles -Slurp Muahh (For Director Pradeep Sarkar)	CHOREOGRAPHER
Provogue Deodorants (For MTV-Viacom 18)	CHOREOGRAPHER
Book My Show Coomercial – Mood Kiya, Book Kiya	CHOREOGRAPHER
7 Up Musical Commercial (I Feel Up)	CHOREOGRAPHER
Royal Stag Commercial	CHOREOGRAPHER
Eleen Hair Product	CHOREOGRAPHER
Himgange Hair Oil	CHOREOGRAPHER
Colgate maxfresh commercial	CHOREOGRAPHER
Knorr soup	CHOREOGRAPHER
Farmlite biscuits	CHOREOGRAPHER
Polycab wires. (carnival theme commercial)	CHOREOGRAPHER
Nirma Advance :Jo Chahiya Woh Chahiya	CHOREOGRAPHER
Pahal Yojna Commercial (Govt of India	CHOREOGRAPHER
Fiama Di Wills Commercial	CHOREOGRAPHER
Patanjali Noodles Commercial	CHOREOGRAPHER
Patanjali Aloeamla Commercial	CHOREOGRAPHER
Just Buy Live Commercial series	CHOREOGRAPHER
Tops pickles	CHOREOGRAPHER
Kutchina kitchen appliances	CHOREOGRAPHER
Kutchina kitchen appliances 2	CHOREOGRAPHER

== Web series ==
Web Series
Title	Role
Cold Lassi aur Chicken Masala	CHOREOGRAPHER
