= Katyar Kaljat Ghusali (film) =

2015 Marathi film directed by Subodh Bhave

Katyar Kaljat Ghusli
- Katyar Kaljat Ghusli poster
- Marathi: कट्यार काळजात घुसली
- Directed by: Subodh Bhave
- Screenplay by: Prakash Kapadia
- Story by: Purushottam Darvhekar
- Based on: Katyar Kaljat Ghusali
- Produced by: Nitin Keni; Nikhil Sane; Sunil Phadtare
- Starring: Sachin Pilgaonkar; Shankar Mahadevan; Subodh Bhave
- Cinematography: Sudheer Palsane
- Edited by: Ashish Mhatre; Apurva Motiwale
- Music by: Shankar–Ehsaan–Loy; Jitendra Abhisheki
- Production companies: Essel Vision Productions; Ganesh Films; Nitin Keni Creations
- Distributed by: Zee Studios; Shree Ganesh Marketing & Films
- Release date: 12 November 2015
- Running time: 162 minutes
- Country: India
- Languages: Marathi; Urdu
- Budget: ₹8 crore (US$830,000)
- Box office: est. ₹40 crore (US$4.2 million)

Katyar Kaljat Ghusali (transl. A dagger through the heart) is a 2015 Indian Marathi-language epic musical drama film based on a play by the same name. Directed by Subodh Bhave, the film stars Sachin Pilgaonkar, Shankar Mahadevan, Subodh Bhave, Amruta Khanvilkar and Mrunmayee Deshpande in lead roles. The film marks the directorial debut for Bhave, and the theatrical acting debut for Shankar Mahadevan. The original play, written by Purushottam Darvhekar, premiered in 1967 in Mumbai, where Hindustani classical vocalist Vasantrao Deshpande played one of the protagonists. In 2010, the play was relaunched with protagonists essayed by Rahul Deshpande, grandson of Vasantrao Deshpande and singer Mahesh Kale. The film's music is composed by Shankar–Ehsaan–Loy, and retained some of the songs from the original play composed by Jitendra Abhisheki.

The film is selected as one of the 26 films to be screened in Goa at 46th International Film Festival of India. The movie was also considered for the United Nations Educational, Scientific and Cultural Organisation's (UNESCO) Fellini medal.

== Plot ==
Set during the British Raj era, Pandit Bhanu Shankar Shastri (Shankar Mahadevan) is an Indian classical singer living in the princely state of Vishrampur with his daughter Uma Shastri (Mrunmayee Deshpande). During one of his shows at Miraj, Shastri meets another classical singer Khansaheb Aftab Hussain Bareliwale (Sachin Pilgaonkar) and requests him to visit Vishrampur. On Dasara festival, the Maharaja of the state arranges an annual singing competition with the winner to be given the status of royal singer, Haveli (Mansion), and a "Katyar" (dagger). The Maharaja proclaims that the state would pardon one murder if committed by the royal singer with this dagger in self-defense. Shastri is challenged by Khansaheb but wins the competition.

Unable to defeat Shastri for fourteen consecutive years, Khansaheb is often humiliated by his wife Nabila (Sakshi Tanwar) and villagers. He survives a suicide attempt but confronts his hatred towards Bhanu Shankar Shastri. Then Nabila (Sakshi Tanwar) gives poison to Shastri which makes him unable to sing, but he can talk. In the following annual competition, Shastri leaves the stage without singing thus making Khansaheb the winner and the royal singer. Khansaheb moves to the haveli with his daughter Zareena (Amruta Khanvilkar) and Shastri leaves the village without informing anyone.

One of Shastri's pupils, Sadashiv (Subodh Bhave), arrives at the haveli to learn music but is disappointed with Shastri's disappearance. Sadashiv meets Khansaheb who, on listening Sadashiv's Shastri-like singing, throws him out of the haveli. Sadashiv, with the help of Zareena, locates Uma and learns the truth about Shastri's renunciation of music and Nabila's attempt to poison Shastri to enable Khansaheb win the competition. Sadashiv attempts to murder Khansaheb but Zarena dissuades him and requests him to challenge Khansaheb in the annual competition. Sadashiv then starts learning music from Uma through Shastri's book and Gramophone records. Later, Sadashiv and Uma locate Shastri in another village and bring him home. Shastri asks Sadashiv to learn from Khansaheb, but knowing Sadashiv's Shastri-like singing style, Khansaheb rejects him as a pupil. Sadashiv then starts learning from Khansaheb in disguise, but gets caught. Sadashiv, when challenged by Khansaheb to out-do him, loses and becomes Khansaheb's slave. As Khansaheb's slave, he cannot sing without Khansaheb's permission. Zareena sees the unfairness in this arrangement and blackmails Khansaab into returning Sadashiv's voice by threatening to expose him in the court. Khansaheb thus releases Sadashiv from his services.

In the following annual competition, Sadashiv challenges Khansaheb. In Jugalbandi (duet), Khansaheb notices that Sadashiv has learnt his singing style, he accuses Sadashiv of stealing his music. He also requests the Maharaja to let him use the dagger in self-defense as he thinks Sadashiv is a threat to his music. The Maharaja agrees but Sadashiv asks for a final performance. He also requests Khansaheb to accept him as a pupil if Khansaheb likes his singing. Sadashiv performs with Shastri's and Khansaheb's singing style. Khansaheb forgives Sadashiv but declines to accept him as a pupil as he thinks he has put himself down with all his earlier deeds with Sadashiv.

== Cast ==
- Sachin Pilgaonkar as Khansaheb Aftab Hussain Bareliwale
- Shankar Mahadevan as Pandit Bhanu Shankar Shastri
- Subodh Bhave as Sadashiv Gurav, Panditji's student
- Amruta Khanvilkar as Zareena, Khansaheb's daughter
- Mrunmayee Deshpande as Uma, Panditji's daughter
- Swapnil Rajshekhar as Maharaja of Vishrampur, King Vishnuraj
- Asmita Chinchalkar as Queen of Vishrampur
- Pushkar Shrotri as Banke Bihari, the royal poet
- Sakshi Tanwar as Nabila, Khansaheb's wife
- Sahil Koparde as Diwanji, secretary of Vishrampur
- Reema Lagoo as voice of the Katyar

== Production ==
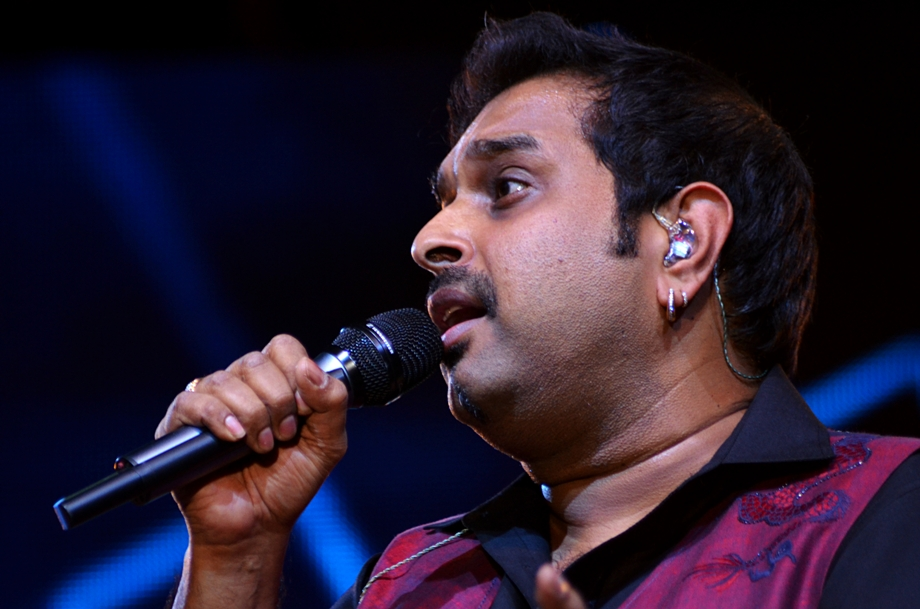
Shankar Mahadevan, who made his acting debut in the film

The film is based on a play by the same name, released in 1967. The original play had Hindustani classical singer Vasantrao Deshpande playing the role of Khansaheb. The play was revived in 2010 and the protagonists were played by Subodh Bhave as Sadashiv and actor Sachin as Khansaheb with Rahul Deshpande singing for Khansaheb. The classical singer Rahul Deshpande is a grandson of Vasantrao Deshpande. The actor Subodh Bhave who performed the role of Sadashiv, was associated with the revived play and decided to make the film representation. Pushkar Shrotri also played the small role of Banke Bihari, the royal poet in the play.

Bhave approached trio Shankar–Ehsaan–Loy to compose the music for the film. He also requested Shankar Mahadevan to play the role of Pandit Bhanu Shankar Shastri, to which singer–composer agreed. Mahadevan acted, sung, and composed for the film. The film marks acting debut for Mahadevan and directorial debut for Bhave. The film has retained some of the songs from the play, composed by Jitendra Abhisheki. Sachin Pilgaonkar was approached to play the role of Khansaheb. Despite being a Marathi language film, all of Pilgaonkar's dialogue are in Urdu. Other actors include Amruta Khanvilkar as Zarina, Mrunmayee Deshpande as Uma, Swapnil Rajshekhar as Maharaja of Vishrampur, King Vishnuraj and Sakshi Tanwar as Nabila (Khansaheb's wife). Vikram Gaikwad has worked as a make-up artist for the film. Prakash Kapadia who had written the screenplay for Bollywood films like Devdas (2002), Black (2005), and Saawariya (2007) has written the screenplay for the film and this is his first association with Marathi cinema.

The film had a budget of about ₹8 crore (US$830,000), which included production as well as marketing costs.

== Soundtrack ==
The film uses various songs from the original play, where the music has been recreated by the musician trio Shankar-Ehsaan-Loy. Some new songs Sur Niragas Ho, Shiv Bhola Bhandari have also been created to feature in the film. The song "Dil Ki Tapish" is based on the Keeravani raga.

== Release and reception ==
The film was released in the Indian states of Maharashtra, Karnataka, Telangana, Goa, Gujarat, and Madhya Pradesh, and internationally in cities including San Francisco, Dallas, and New Jersey, on 12 November, as well as Orlando on 13 December. The film had English subtitles, and was shown on 220 screens showing 3,500 shows. After continued positive responses in the 2nd week, the number of screenings was increased to 300, showing 3,900 shows across India. The film is distributed by Essel Vision. The film was released in Dubai as a special screening on 18 December 2015 and received tremendous response from UAE public. It also became the first ever Marathi movie to release in Bahrain, Australia and Japan as a special screening on 8 January 2016, 31 January 2016 and 5 March 2016, and received very good response from the viewers. The film was screened in Australia in all the major cities including Melbourne, Brisbane, Adelaide, Perth and Canberra. It was screened in Japan at Aeon Cinema in the Tokyo suburb of Myoden. The film was a major success in the United States and was screened in over 50 cities through San Francisco Bay Area-based non-profit Indian Classical Music and Arts (ICMA) Foundation.

ABP Majha gave 4 out of 5 stars and declared the film "a rich masterpiece". Pune Mirror gave 4 out of 5 stars and calling it "a well-packaged and culturally significant entertainment for the new generation". The Maharashtra Times rated it 4 out of 5. The Times of India gave 4 out of 5 stars.

== Box office ==
The film collected over ₹80 million (US$830,000) in the first week of its release. The positive reviews led the movie to gross around ₹400 million (US$4.2 million) at the box office making it one of the highest-grossing Marathi films of all time.

== Accolades ==
Year	Award	Category	Recipient	Result
2015	International Film Festival of India	ICFT-UNESCO Fellini Award	Subodh Bhave	Nominated
2015	Filmfare Awards Marathi	Best Film	Subodh Bhave	Won
2015	Filmfare Awards Marathi	Best Director	Subodh Bhave	Won
2015	Filmfare Awards Marathi	Best Actor	Sachin Pilgaonkar	Won
2015	Filmfare Awards Marathi	Best Supporting Actress	Amruta Khanvilkar	Nominated
2015	Filmfare Awards Marathi	Best Music Director	Shankar-Ehsaan-Loy	Won
2015	Filmfare Awards Marathi	Best Lyricist	Mangesh Kangane (Sur Niragas Ho)	Won
2015	Filmfare Awards Marathi	Best Playback Singer – Male	Shankar Mahadevan (Sur Niragas Ho)	Won
2015	Filmfare Awards Marathi	Best Production Design	Santosh Phutane	Won
2015	Filmfare Awards Marathi	Best Background Score	Santosh Mulekar	Won
2016	Maharashtra State Film Awards	Best Actor	Sachin Pilgaonkar	Nominated
2016	Maharashtra State Film Awards	Best Supporting Actress	Amruta Khanvilkar	Nominated
2016	Maharashtra State Film Awards	Best Music Director	Shankar–Ehsaan–Loy	Won
2016	Maharashtra State Film Awards	Best Singer – Male	Mahesh Kale	Won
2016	Maharashtracha Favourite Kon?	Favourite Film	Katyar Kaljat Ghusali	Nominated
2016	Maharashtracha Favourite Kon?	Favourite Director	Subodh Bhave	Nominated
2016	Maharashtracha Favourite Kon?	Favourite Actor	Subodh Bhave	Nominated
2016	Maharashtracha Favourite Kon?	Favourite Actress	Amruta Khanvilkar	Nominated
2016	Maharashtracha Favourite Kon?	Favourite Actress	Mrunmayee Deshpande	Nominated
2016	Maharashtracha Favourite Kon?	Favourite Supporting Actress	Sakshi Tanwar	Nominated
2016	Maharashtracha Favourite Kon?	Favourite Villain	Sachin Pilgaonkar	Won
2016	Maharashtracha Favourite Kon?	Favourite Singer – Male	Shankar Mahadevan (Sur Niragas Ho)	Nominated
2016	Maharashtracha Favourite Kon?	Favourite Singer – Male	Mahesh Kale (Aruni Kirani)	Nominated
2016	Maharashtracha Favourite Kon?	Favourite Singer – Female	Anandi Joshi (Sur Niragas Ho)	Nominated
2021	Maharashtracha Favourite Kon? Suvarnadasak Sohla	Favourite Villain	Sachin Pilgaonkar	Nominated
2016	National Film Awards	Best Male Playback Singer	Mahesh Kale	Won
2016	Sanskruti Kala Darpan Awards	Best Film	Shree Ganesh Marketing and Films	Won
2016	Sanskruti Kala Darpan Awards	Best Director	Subodh Bhave	Won
2016	Sanskruti Kala Darpan Awards	Best Supporting Actor	Shankar Mahadevan	Nominated
2016	Sanskruti Kala Darpan Awards	Best Supporting Actress	Mrunmayee Deshpande	Nominated
2016	Sanskruti Kala Darpan Awards	Manacha Mujra Award	Sachin Pilgaonkar	Won
2016	Sanskruti Kala Darpan Awards	Best Music	Pandit Jitendra Abhisheki, Shankar-Ehsan-Loy	Nominated
2016	Sanskruti Kala Darpan Awards	Best Playback Singer (Male)	Shankar Mahadevan (Sur Niragas Ho)	Nominated
2016	Sanskruti Kala Darpan Awards	Best Playback Singer (Male)	Rahul Deshpande, Mahesh Kale (Surat Piya Ki)	Won
2016	Sanskruti Kala Darpan Awards	Best Lyricist	Mangesh Kangane (Sur Niragas Ho)	Won
2016	Sanskruti Kala Darpan Awards	Best Dialogues	Prakash Kapadia	Nominated
2016	Sanskruti Kala Darpan Awards	Best Screenplay	Prakash Kapadia	Nominated
2016	Sanskruti Kala Darpan Awards	Best Cinematography	SudhirPalsane	Won
2016	Sanskruti Kala Darpan Awards	Best Editing	Ashish Mhatre, Apurva Motiwali-Sahay	Nominated
2016	Sanskruti Kala Darpan Awards	Best Production Design	Santosh Phutane	Won
2016	Sanskruti Kala Darpan Awards	Best Make-Up	Vikram Gaikwad	Nominated
2016	Zee Chitra Gaurav Puraskar	Best Film	Katyar Kaljat Ghusali	Won
2016	Zee Chitra Gaurav Puraskar	Best Director	Subodh Bhave	Nominated
2016	Zee Chitra Gaurav Puraskar	Special Jury Award Best Director Entry	Subodh Bhave	Won
2016	Zee Chitra Gaurav Puraskar	Best Supporting Actor	Subodh Bhave	Nominated
2016	Zee Chitra Gaurav Puraskar	Special Jury Award Best Actor	Sachin Pilgaonkar	Won
2016	Zee Chitra Gaurav Puraskar	Best Supporting Actress	Amruta Khanvilkar	Nominated
2016	Zee Chitra Gaurav Puraskar	Garnier Natural Performer Of The Year	Amruta Khanvilkar	Won
2016	Zee Chitra Gaurav Puraskar	Best Screenplay	Prakash Kapadiya	Won
2016	Zee Chitra Gaurav Puraskar	Best Dialogue	Prakash Kapadiya	Won
2016	Zee Chitra Gaurav Puraskar	Best Music	Shankar-Ehsaan-Loy	Won
2016	Zee Chitra Gaurav Puraskar	Best Playback Singer-Male	Shankar Mahadevan (Sur Niragas Ho)	Won
2016	Zee Chitra Gaurav Puraskar	Best Lyricists	Mangesh Kangane (Sur Niragas Ho)	Won
2016	Zee Chitra Gaurav Puraskar	Special Jury Award Best Singers	Rahul Deshpande, Mahesh Kale	Won
2016	Zee Chitra Gaurav Puraskar	Best Background Music	Santosh Mulekar	Won
2016	Zee Chitra Gaurav Puraskar	Best Sound Design	Anmol Bhave	Won
2016	Zee Chitra Gaurav Puraskar	Best Editor	Ashish Mhatre and Apoorva Motiwale	Nominated
2016	Zee Chitra Gaurav Puraskar	Best Cinematography	Sudhir Palsane	Won
2016	Zee Chitra Gaurav Puraskar	Best Make-up Artist	Vikram Gaikwad	Nominated
2016	Zee Chitra Gaurav Puraskar	Best Costumes	Nachiket Barve and Pournima Oak	Won
2022	Zee Maha Gaurav Puraskar	Best Film (2016)	Katyar Kaljat Ghusali	Won
2022	Zee Maha Gaurav Puraskar	Best Villain	Sachin Pilgaonkar	Won
2022	Zee Maha Gaurav Puraskar	Best Actor	Subodh Bhave	Won

== See also ==
- Highest grossing Marathi films
