= Nachiket Barve =

Indian fashion designer of Mumbai, India

- Born: Mumbai, Maharashtra, India
- Education: Narsee Monjee College of Commerce and Economics; National Institute of Design; ENSAD
- Occupation: Fashion designer
- Known for: Indo western couture
- Spouse: Surabhi Barve
- Children: 1
- Awards: Fashion Entrepreneur of the Year

Nachiket Barve is an Indian fashion designer of Mumbai, India. His eponymous fashion label was launched at the Gen Next show at the Lakme Fashion Week in Mumbai. In 2010, Barve received the British Fashion Council and Elle Magazine "Young Fashion Entrepreneur of the Year" award.

== Early life and education ==
Barve was born and grew up in Mumbai. He completed a Bachelor degree in commerce at the Narsee Monjee College of Commerce and Economics. He then studied apparel and accessory design at the National Institute of Design (NID) in Ahmedabad. Barve was awarded a French government scholarship to study at the École Nationale Supérieure des Arts Décoratifs (E.N.S.A.D). There, he worked with haute couture ateliers learning handmade flower making, pleating, and working with feathers, leather and accessories. Barve completed his final project with mentors Abu Jani and Sandeep Khosla and he was an intern at Celine (a subsidiary of Louis Vuitton Moet Hennessy LVMH) and with the textile designer, Neeru Kumar.

== Career ==
In March 2007, Nachiket launched his label at Lakme Fashion Week in Mumbai. Fashion critics such as Suzy Menkes and Carine Roitfeld have written about his work Barve's designs were included in the book, Contemporary Indian Design. Barve has been invited to show his designs at BAFWEEK (Buenos Aires Fashion Week) in Argentina and at the twice yearly fashion show, Coterie in New York City.

In 2010, Nachiket won the British Fashion Council and Elle "Fashion Entrepreneur of the Year" award where he represented India. In 2011, Barve spoke at an Italian government entrepreneurs' conference representing India's young fashion designers. In 2012, the British Fashion Council invited Barve to showcase a collection at the annual Alchemy festival, South Bank, London. He was also part of the Blenders Pride tour promoting the Indian whisky

In 2011, Nachiket designed costumes for a television commercial advertising Tanishq jewellery during the Diwali festival. It starred the actor Amitabh Bachchan and actress, Jaya Bachchan.

In 2012, Nachiket collaborated with Pooja Dhingra, a pastry chef. Dhingra was the owner of the Le 15 Patisserie in Mumbai. Together, they produced a special edition range of macaroons and packaging inspired by Nachiket's Caravan collection. The collection had been presented at Wills India Lifestyle Fashion Week.

The Barve Nachiket label was a part of Caravan 2014, an initiative to showcase and retail Indian fashion. It was a curated collection of designer brands at the Harvey Nichols store in Riyadh.

== Designs ==
Nachiket produces bespoke fashions and Indianwear. The Barve Nachiket label has been sold in India, the US, Singapore and Nigeria. The label has also been sold at the Pernia pop-up shop, and the Rent the Runway internet shop.

Nachiket's designs are inspired by his travels, science, nature and functionality. For instance, his 2014 collection took inspiration from Maori culture.

Nachiket experiments with fabrics, the joyous use of colour and intricate surface detail. Nachiket's philosophy is to challenge pre-existing norms and make fashion relevant to women no matter race, age, size or body type.
