= Mahesh Kale =

Indian vocalist and singer (born 1976)

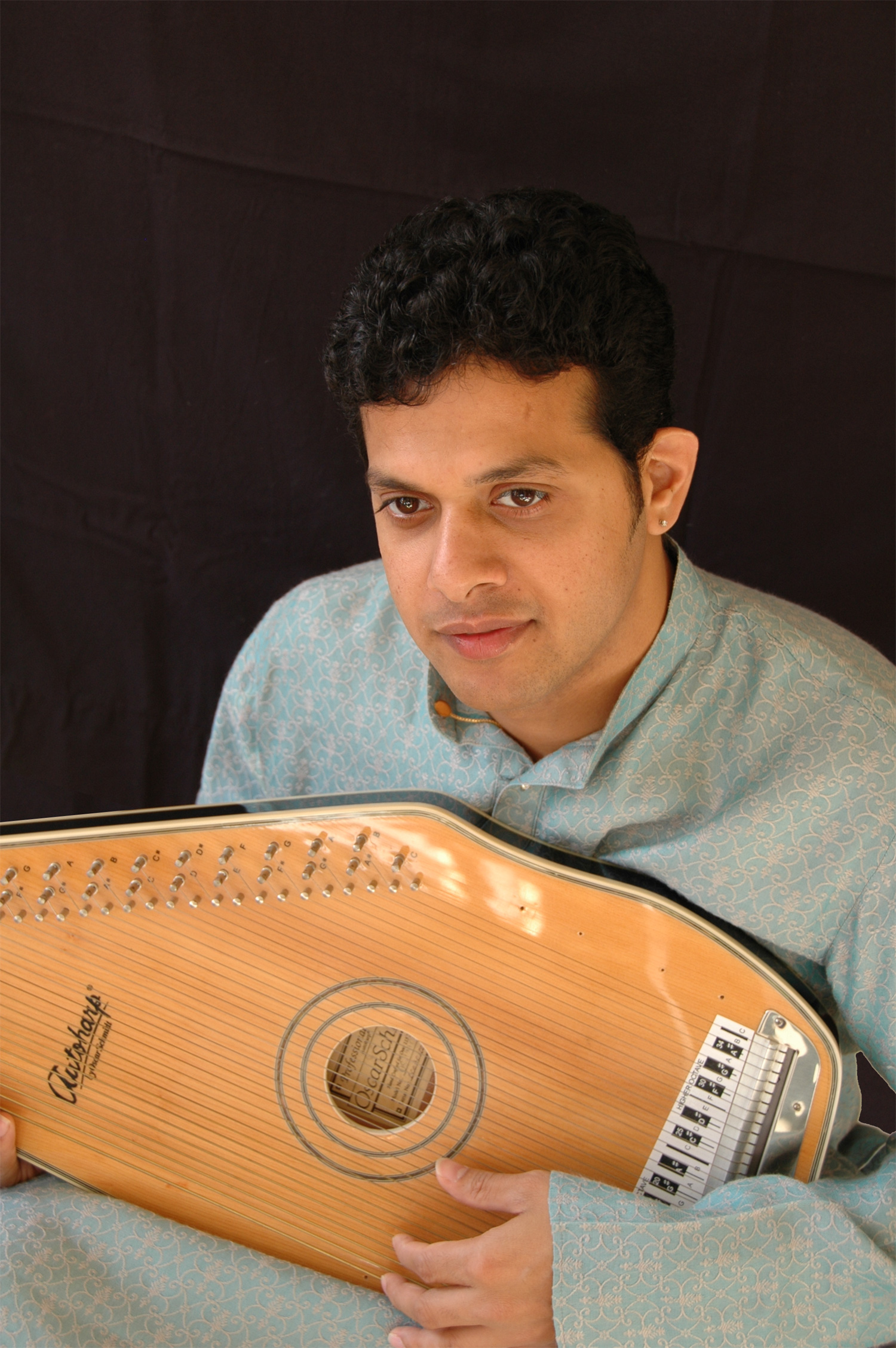
- Mahesh Kale in 2009

Background information
- Born: Mahesh Kale; 12 January 1976 (age 50); Pune, Maharashtra, India
- Genres: Indian Classical Music, Hindustani Classical Music, Semi-Classical, Devotional, Natya Sangeet
- Occupations: Singer Performer, Composer, Educator
- Instrument: Voice
- Website: www.maheshkale.com

Mahesh Kale (Born 12 January 1976) is an Indian classical vocalist and playback singer renowned for his specialization in Indian Classical (Hindustani), Semi-Classical, Devotional music including Natya Sangeet. Mahesh Kale won India's 63rd National Film Award as the Best Playback Singer, for the song Aruni Kirani in the film Katyar Kaljat Ghusli from the President of India. He is a disciple of Pandit Jitendra Abhisheki a prominent singer from Agra gharana. He was ranked nineteenth in The Times of India's Top 20 Most Desirable Men of Maharashtra in 2017. He has played a key role in bringing Hindustani Classical Music into the mainstream with a touch of modern glamor and is one of the most prominent Indian Classical musicians of the new generation.

== Early life and background ==
Mahesh was born and raised in a musical family in Pune, Maharashtra, India. He began his early music education under the guidance of his mother Smt. Meenal Kale. She had a master's degree in Indian Classical Music and was a disciple of Veena Sahasrabuddhe.

Mahesh gave his first solo performance at the age of 3 at Gondavale, with the rendition of a devotional song he mesmerized an audience of over 5000. At the age of 6, he started learning music formally from his mother Smt. Meenal Kale. Later he learned from Shri Purushottam Gangurde. Despite his young age, Mahesh was chosen as the disciple of legendary Pandit Jitendra Abhisheki in 1991. Under his tutelage in a gurukul-like setting, Mahesh was extensively trained in classical and semi-classical forms like thumri, dadra, tappa, bhajans, and marathi natya sangeet for over 8 years. During that time, he accompanied his guru Pt. Jitendra Abhisheki as a vocal support in concerts all across India and also received vocal guidance from Shri Shounak Abhisheki (son of Pt. Jitendra Abhisheki).

Mahesh holds a Bachelors in Electronics Engineering from Vishwakarma Institute of Technology affiliated to Savitribai Phule Pune University (India) and a master's degree in Engineering Management from Santa Clara University (United States). Mahesh is married to Purva Gujar-Kale (m. 2005) and they run non-profit Indian Classical Music and Arts Foundation together in San Francisco Bay Area.

== Career ==
Mahesh has performed extensively across India, US, UAE, UK, Australia, Europe, and Southeast Asia for concerts of Indian Classical and Semi-classical Music.

Since early 2010, Mahesh has been playing the central character in Katyar Kaljat Ghusli, the evergreen Sangeet Natak (musical). The 100th show of Katyar Kaljat Ghusali was performed in Vasantotsav 2016 at Pune recently. Mahesh debuted at the Sawai Gandharva Bhimsen Festival in 2011 which received generous appreciation.

He has performed in Indian Classical as well as fusion concerts with world-famous percussionists like Ustad Zakir Hussain, Sivamani and Trilok Gurtu, and instrumentalists like Pedro Eustache and Frank Martin and in Jazz concerts with well known composer and saxophonist George Brooks and groove-master bassist Kai Eckhardt. Mahesh has also performed at non-traditional avenues like the NH7 Weekender, Pune (2018), 26/11 Stories of Strength tribute concert at the Gateway of India (2018, 2019).

He has given lecture-demonstrations in various US universities including Stanford and Harvard University and at institutions like Commonwealth Club and INKTalks.

Kale is passionate about classical music education and firmly believes that quality education should be affordable and globally accessible. He is the founder of MKSM (Mahesh Kale School of Music), headquartered in the San Francisco Bay Area, which imparts education to over a thousand students worldwide. He has also voiced the songs sung by the character of "Sadashiv" (portrayed by Subodh Bhave) in the movie Katyar Kaljat Ghusali which released on 12 November 2015 and received National Film Award for Best Playback Singer (Male) 2015.

He is also a popular judge on the TV show Sur Nava Dhyas Nava on Colors Marathi TV channel which scouts for the singing talent in Maharashtra.

== Awards ==
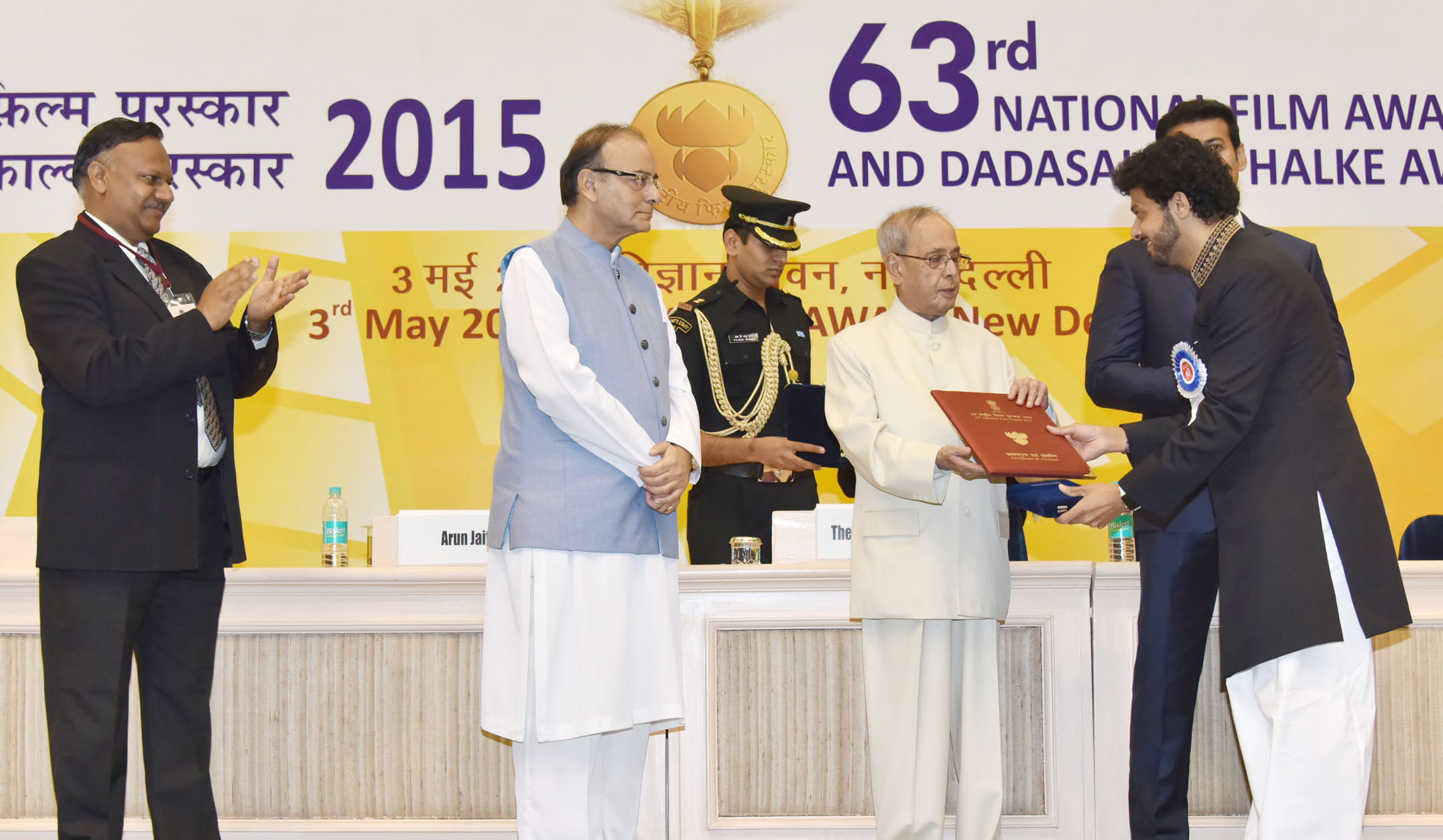
Mahesh Kale receiving the National Film Award for Best Male Playback Singer for Katyar Kaljat Ghusli, at the 63rd National Film Awards Function, in New Delhi, 2016

- "National Film Award for Best Playback Singer (Male)" for the film Katyar Kaljat Ghusali at 63rd National Film Awards 2015
- "Majha Sanman Award" by ABP Majha 2016
- "Pride of India Award" WCRC 2016
- "Pravah Ratna" award by Star Pravah 2016
- "Sanskruti Kaladarpan Award" – Best Singer 2016
- "Manik Verma Puraskar" – 2016
- "Radio Mirchi Music Award" – Best Song 2016
- "Radio Mirchi Music Award" – Best Upcoming Vocalist (Male) 2016
- "Radio Mirchi Music Award" – Best Album Katyar Kaljat Ghusli 2016
- "Zee Cine Gaurav Puraskar" – Special Jury Award 2016
- Akhil Bharatiya Marathi Natya Parishad Award for his role in musical Katyar Kaljat Ghusali (2015)
- "ICC Inspire Award" of India Community Center San Francisco Bay Area (2019)
- Best Music Influencer Award - Lokmat Digital Influencer Awards (2021)
- United States House of Representatives - Proclamation (2023)
- Suryadatta National Award (2024)
- Mata Youth Icon (2024)
- Bal Gandharva Gungaurav Award (2024)

== Discography ==
- Prarambh, the beginning
- NatyaSaurabh
- Adhvan
- Introducing Mahesh Kale (by SaReGaMa Records)
- NatyaBhaktiRang (by SaReGaMa Records)
- Sukhache je sukh (by SaReGaMa Records)
- Dharti Ma - A Tribute to Earth (by Earth Day Network - India)
- We For Love in collaboration with Amaan Ali Bangash and Ayaan Ali Bangash - Justice For Every Child campaign by Kailash Satyarthi Children’s Foundation (KSCF)
