= Katyar Kaljat Ghusali (play) =

1967 play by Purushottam Darvhekar

Katyar Kaljat Ghusli
- Original language: Marathi
- Written by: Purushottam Darvhekar
- Music by: Jitendra Abhisheki
- Genre: Sangeet Natak

Katyar Kaljat Ghusali is a Marathi musical play (Sangeet Natak), originally released in 1967. The play gained such popularity that more than 1,000 shows were staged in a very short period. The play was written by Purushottam Darvhekar. The story depicts clash of two gharanas (schools) of Indian classical music. Pt. Jeetendra Abhisheki composed the padas (songs performed live during play).

== Cast ==
- Vasantrao Deshpande as Khansaheb Aftab Hussain Bareliwale
- Prasad Sawkar as Sadashiv, Panditji's student
- Bhargavram Acharekar as Pandit Bhanu Shankar Shastri
- Faiyaz Shaikh as Zareena, Khansaheb's daughter
- Bakul Pandit as Uma, Panditji's daughter

== Plot ==
The story is based on an Indian classical vocalist, Khansaheb who is extremely proud about his musical gharana, unwilling to reveal the style of his gharana to anyone else.

The play starts with Uma, daughter of Pandit Bhanushankar Shastri alias Panditji, the ex-royal singer (Rajagayak) of the princely state of Vishrampur, making preparations to leave the Haweli as her father's successor, the new Rajagayak is about to arrive. The new Rajagayak, Aftab Hussain Bareliwale alias Khansaheb has won due to the Pandit's sudden exit from the singing contest in the court the previous day without singing. Uma is hurt as well as astonished by this. After a brief encounter with Khansaheb following his entry, Uma leaves the house in tears. The diwan presents to Khansaheb the Katar/Katyar for self-defense of the royal singer, one murder by using which shall be pardoned.

A while later when Khansaheb is having a chat with Banke Bihari, the royal poet, a tired young man enters, talking about how this was the very place he was wanting to come. Before anyone can even ask his name, he falls into a swoon. On gaining consciousness, he reveals that he is Sadashiv Gurav, a boy from Miraj, whom Panditji had met and taught twelve years ago. At that time, he was not able to learn much, but had now come to seek Panditji and his guidance. Within a few minutes, he was told all that had befallen. He expressed his disappointment, also requesting Khansaheb to teach him instead. Khansaheb asks him to sing so that he may judge his voice. After a while, he asks Sadashiv to stop and refuses to teach him saying that the boy's style is very much like Panditji's, and cannot be changed to suit him. Sadashiv goes away with disappointment.

However, Sadashiv is determined to learn from Khansaheb and accepts him as his teacher on his own. He attends Khansaheb's concerts, moves about in the haveli in disguise, all to satisfy his thirst for knowledge. Sadashiv also hides in the haweli with the support of Zarina to learn music. Khansaheb catches him twice, and although he is saved by Panditji's sudden entry the first time, Khansaheb makes sure no one can bail him out the second time. Then he prepares to kill Sadashiv with the Katyar, but Sadashiv begs for an opportunity to sing before him for the last time. Sadashiv asks for a final performance. He also requests Khansaheb to accept him as a pupil if Khansaheb likes his singing. Sadashiv performs with both Shastri's and Khansaheb's singing style. Khansaheb forgives Sadashiv but declines to accept him as a pupil as he thinks he has put himself down with all his earlier deeds with Sadashiv. What follows makes the title, "Katyar Kaljat Ghusali", totally relevant.

== List of songs ==
Track	Song	In Devanagari	Performer
01	"Muralidhar Shyam"	मुरलीधर श्याम	Pt. Prasad Sawkar
02	"Ghei Chand Makarand (Raag Salagwarali)"	घेई छंद मकरंद	Pt. Jitendra Abhisheki
03	"Lagi Kalejava Katar"	लागी करजवाँ कट्यार	Pt. Jitendra Abhisheki
04	"Surat Piya Ki"	सुरत पिया की	Dr. Vasantrao Deshpande
05	"Din Gele Bhajanavin Sare"	दिन गेले भजनाविण सारे	Pt. Bhargavram Acharekar
06	"Tejonidhi Loh gol"	तेजोनिधी लोहगोल	Dr. Vasantrao Deshpande
07	"Ghei Chand Makarand (Raag Dhaani)"	घेई छंद मकरंद	Dr. Vasantrao Deshpande
08	"Hya Bhavanatil Geet Purane"	ह्या भवनातील गीत पुराणे	Dr. Vasantrao Deshpande

== Plays performed by other groups ==
This play has been performed by many groups later on. The main character of Khan Saheb in the play has been done by many actors after Vasantrao Deshpande including Pt. Padmakar Kulkarni, Dr. Ravindra Ghangurde, Chandrakant Limaye, Charudatta Aphale and Rahul Deshpande.

=== Bharat Natya Sanshodhan Mandir ===
The play was revived by Bharat Natya Sanshodhan Mandir, Pune in the year 2001. The team was as follows:

Director: Ravindra Khare

- Charudatta Aphale as Khansaheb Aftab Hussain Bareliwale
- Sanjeev Mehendale as Sadashiv, Panditji's student
- Gautam Murudeshwar as Pandit Bhanushankar Shastri
- Kavita Tikekar as Zareena, Khansaheb's daughter
- Swarpriya Behere as Uma, Panditji's daughter
- Ram Sathye as Kaviraj Banke Bihari, the royal poet
- Ravindra khare as Diwanji
- Avinash Phatak as Chand
- Hrishikesh Badve as Usman
- Tushar Deshpande as Young Sadashiv
- Abhay Jabade as Badri

This group crossed more than 100 shows.

=== Vasantrao Deshpande Sangeet Sabha ===
The play was revived in 1997 by Pandit Chandrakant Limaye again with a new cast including Pandit Chandrakant Limaye, Amol Bawdekar, Raghunandan Panshikar, Deepashri Kale, Suvarna Kagal.

=== Dr Vasantrao Deshpande Pratishthan ===
The play was revived in 2010 again with a new cast including Rahul Deshpande, grandson of Pt Vasantrao Deshpande, Mahesh Kale and Subodh Bhave. This play completed 100 shows in total recently. The 100th show was performed in Vasantotsav 2016 at Ramanbag, Pune on 16 Jan. 2016.

Director: Subodh Bhave

- Rahul Deshpande as Khansaheb Aftab Hussain Bareliwale
- Mahesh Kale as Sadashiv, Panditji's student, now also done by Chaitanya Kulkarni
- Dipti Mate as Zareena, Khansaheb's daughter
- Vedashree Oke as Uma, Panditji's daughter, now done by Asmita Chinchalkar
- Subodh Bhave as Kaviraj Banke Bihari, the royal poet
- Ravindra Bapat as Diwanji
- Amey Wagh as Chand, Khansaheb's nephew now done by Saurabh Kadgaonlkar
- Saurabh Kadgaonkar as Usman, Khansaheb's nephew
- Prashant Tapaswi as Badriprasad

== Films based on the Play ==
The film has been made into a Marathi feature film of the same name in 2016, directed by Subodh Bhave. The film story is not exactly same as the original play but it is just based on the play. Few changes have been made in the story, characters and few new songs added in the film.
