= Vasantrao Deshpande =

Indian classical singer

Doctor Vasantrao Deshpande वसंतराव देशपांडे
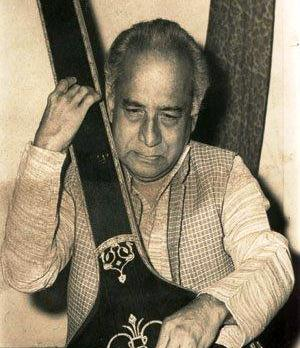

Background information
- Born: 2 May 1920; Sawalapur, Tal. Murtijapur, Akola district, Maharashtra
- Died: 30 July 1983 (aged 63) Pune, Maharashtra, India
- Genres: Hindustani classical music (which included Khayal, Natya Sangeet, Thumri, Ghazal, Tappa)
- Occupations: Singer, actor, musician
- Instrument: Vocals
- Years active: 1928–1983
- Website: vasantraodeshpande.com

Dr. Vasantrao Deshpande (2 May 1920 – 30 July 1983) was a Hindustani classical vocalist renowned for his contribution to Sangeet Natak. Deshpande notably starred in Purushottam Darvhekar's popular play Katyar Kaljat Ghusli.

== Early life ==
Dr. Vasantrao Deshpande was born into a Deshastha Brahmin family in Murtizapur, Akola District, in the Vidarbha region of Maharashtra in India. At the age of eight, Vasantrao Deshpande's ability was observed by Bhalji Pendharkar, who cast him in the role of Krishna in the Hindi movie Kaliya Mardan (1935). He obtained his PhD in Music.

== Training ==
Dr. Vasantrao Deshpande got trained under several gurus, in various different schools of singing. He began his musical training with Mstr. Shankarrao Sapre of Gwalior, a disciple of V. D. Paluskar, in Nagpur. His training was alongside C. Ramchandra under their Guru Master Shankarrao Sapre. After this, he studied under several musicians including Sureshbabu Mane (son of Ustad Abdul Karim Khan) of Kirana gharana, Asad Ali Khan of Patiala gharana, Aman Ali Khan and Anjanibai Malpekar of Bhendibazaar gharana, and Ramkrishnabuwa Vaze (Vazebuwa) of the Gwalior gharana. Dinanath Mangeshkar, a direct disciple of Vazebuwa, had a particularly strong influence over Deshpande, who is regarded as Mangeshkar's musical heir, having adopted his signature mercurial and dramatic style of singing.

== Career ==
Dr. Deshpande performed classical and semi-classical music, appearing in movies including Kaliya Mardan, Dudh Bhaat, and Ashtavinayak. He issued several commercial releases under his name, and created raga Raj Kalyan, a variant of Yaman without pancham.

Deshpande's students included Chandrakant Limaye, Vijay Koparkar and Pt Padmakar Kulkarni.

== Family ==
His grandson, Rahul Deshpande, is also a singer, and has also reprised some of his roles on stage and screen, such as Khansaheb in Katyar Kaljat Ghusali. Rahul Deshpande has portrayed Vasantrao in a film entitled Me Vasantrao, that is based on Deshpande's life.

== Legacy ==
A foundation, the Dr. Vasantrao Deshpande Pratishthan, organizes Vasantotsav, an annual music festival at Pune in his memory. The annual festival is held over three days during January. During the festival, two awards, the "Vasantotsav Youth Award" for Promising Artists and the "Vasantotsav Award" for veteran artists, are given out.

In 2011, a three-day music and dance festival in Nagpur was organized by the Indian government's South-Central Zone Cultural Centre (SCZCC) in Deshpande's memory.

A film entitled Me Vasantrao, based on Deshpande's life, was scheduled to be released on 1 May 2020, but was postponed due to the COVID-19 pandemic. Later it was released on 1 April 2022.

== Awards ==
- 1982 – Sangeet Natak Akademi Award

== Filmography ==
=== Theatre ===
Year	Production	Role	Producer	Notes
1967	Katyar Kaljat Ghusli	Khansaheb	Purushottam Darvhekar	Over 1000 performances by 1976.

== Bibliography ==
- "Vasantrao Deshpande: Marathi Stage Phenomenon". Bhavan's Journal. Bharatiya Vidya Bhavan. 1983. pp. 25–28.
