= Purushottam Darvhekar =

Indian writer (1926–1999)

Purushottam Darwhekar
- Born: June 1, 1926
- Died: September 21, 1999 (aged 73)
- Occupation: writer
- Family: Grandson Avishkar Darwhekar

Purushottam Darwhekar (1 June 1926 – 21 September 1999) was an Indian writer and producer of Indian classical and semi-classical musical plays and radio and television programs. He is credited with a revival of the Marathi musical theater (sangeet natya) in the 1960s.

== Early life in Nagpur ==
Purushottam Darwhekar studied in Nilcity High School, Nagpur. After B. Sc. B. T., he completed M. A. LL.B. with Gold Medal. He was a teacher at Kurve’s New Model High School, Hadas High School, and at Sule High School in Nagpur. He joined Balvihar (Akashvani radio, Nagpur) and thereafter became Script Writer and then Assistant Producer.

== Career in Broadcasting and Drama ==
Darwhekar was Assistant Producer at Delhi Doordarshan from 1961 to 1963, before moving to Mumbai All India Radio (Akashwani) as Producer. He worked as a member of the Stage Review Committee from 1974 to 1980.

In 1977, he was appointed Special Executive Magistrate. He was also the President of Films, Drama and Cultural Development Board in the same year. He was made the President of Baroda Marathi Sahitya Mandal. He also served as the President of 58th Drama Conference at Pune and by then he was an honorable personality of Marathi Theatre.

He was appointed as Producer in Mumbai Doordrashan in 1986. By the time he retired, he had produced 700 scripts in Hawamahal, Balvihar, and Doordarshan serials, including serials on Pandit Nehru and the China War. After retirement he returned to Nagpur and was appointed as ‘Producer Emeritus’ in the M.F.A. Department of Nagpur University.

== Marathi Theater ==
Darwhekar's theatre work began while living in the Mahal area of Nagpur around 1947–1948. He wrote his first children's play, a musical titled Sampacha Vaar, for the Ganapati Festival. He selected twelve-year-old Vimal Fulay from Morone's Gaayan Shala for the lead role. The play ran for fifteen days at various venues. The following year, he wrote another musical, Swargatil Kala Bazaar, featuring the same lead. He wrote scripts, lyrics, and music, and also directed his plays, occasionally performing in them when actors were absent.

On 14 October 1950, Darwhekar established the drama company Ranjan Kala Mandir and presented his first play ‘Atombomb Va Adkitta’. Ranjan Kala Mandir became an institution, spreading to Nagpur, because of his efforts. Through this institution, he contributed to the progress of Marathi Theatre. As a Director he helped start the careers of many actors.

The Child Plays of Mr. Purushottam Darwhekar:

- Upashi Rakshas
- Kabuli Vala
- Paryancha Mahal
- Morucha Mama
- Naradachi Shendi
- Abra-Ki-Dabra

Darwhekar settled in Mumbai in 1973 and expanded the scope of his drama company. His entry in the Maharashtra State Drama Festival, Chandra Nabhicha Dhalala, bagged his company first prize.

Darwhekar is remembered now for a musical play he wrote, "Katyar Kaljat Ghusali". The play ran during the 1960s, was revived later in 2011, and was optioned for a film. In 2015, the Marathi film "Katyar Kaljat Ghusali" was made by adapting his play.

He was also the director of Vasant Kanetkar's historical play "Ithe Oshalala Mrityu" and V.V Shirwadkar's "Natasamrat"
