= Harishchandrachi Factory =

- Theatrical release poster
- Directed by: Paresh Mokashi
- Written by: Paresh Mokashi
- Produced by: Ronnie Screwvala; Smiti Kanodia; Paresh Mokashi
- Starring: Nandu Madhav; Vibhavari Deshpande
- Cinematography: Amalendu Chaudhary
- Edited by: Amit Pawar
- Music by: Anand Modak
- Production companies: Paprika Media; Mayasabha
- Distributed by: UTV Motion Pictures
- Release dates: July 2009 (Osian's Cinefan); 29 January 2010 (India)
- Running time: 96 minutes
- Country: India
- Language: Marathi

Harishchandrachi Factory (transl. Harishchandra's Factory) is a 2009 Indian Marathi-language biographical film written and directed by Paresh Mokashi. It is about Dadasaheb Phalke, who made the first Indian feature film Raja Harishchandra (1913), and starring Nandu Madhav as him and Vibhavari Deshpande as his wife Saraswati. Harishchandrachi Factory focuses on the struggle Phalke faced during its production.

The film is the directorial debut of Paresh Mokashi who won the Best Director award at Pune International Film Festival, where the film was shown. In September 2009, it was selected as India's official entry to Academy Award in the Best Foreign Language Film Category, making it the second film, after Shwaas (2004), in Marathi cinema to receive this honour.

== Plot ==
The film opens in 1911, with Dhundiraj Govind Phalke, known as Dadasaheb Phalke (Nandu Madhav), working as a printer and photographer in Bombay. He lives with his wife Saraswati Bai (Vibhavari Deshpande) and their children. Phalke's work at the printing press is interrupted by disagreements with his business partners, and he eventually leaves the printing business.

Phalke later watches a screening of a foreign silent film about Jesus Christ. Fascinated by the medium, he becomes determined to make films in India. He begins experimenting with filmmaking and photography at home, much to the curiosity and concern of his family. Saraswati Bai supports his interest despite the financial uncertainty it creates for the household. He studies available material about filmmaking and experiments with a camera and film equipment. He decides that he needs to learn the technical aspects of cinema and travels to London. Before leaving, he explains his plans to Saraswati Bai, who agrees to support him. In London, he meets filmmaker Cecil Hepworth and learns about filmmaking equipment and techniques. He returns to India with a motion-picture camera and begins preparing to make an Indian film.

Back in Bombay, Phalke starts experimenting with the camera and film stock. He conducts various tests, including filming a growing plant over several days to demonstrate the possibilities of time-lapse photography. He gradually assembles a team of assistants and begins searching for actors. He decides to make a film based on the story of King Harishchandra from Hindu mythology. He names the project Raja Harishchandra. Finding actors willing to work in films proves difficult, particularly for the female roles, as acting is regarded as socially unacceptable. He searches for suitable performers and eventually casts Anna Salunke (Mayur Khandge) a man who works as a cook, as Taramati.

As preparations continue, Saraswati Bai becomes closely involved in the production. She prepares costumes, helps with makeup and assists with the practical work required for the shoot. The family also becomes part of Phalke's filmmaking activities, with his children participating in the production. He and his team construct sets and begin shooting Raja Harishchandra. Because the actors and technicians have little experience with cinema, Phalke has to explain how scenes are to be performed for the camera. The production is repeatedly interrupted by technical and practical difficulties. He continues shooting despite these problems and the financial pressure caused by the production. At one point, Phalke's continued investment in filmmaking creates concern within his family. Saraswati Bai nevertheless remains supportive of his efforts. Phalke also faces difficulty feeding and maintaining his growing group of workers, while the production requires increasingly more money and resources.

After completing the shooting, Phalke processes and assembles the film. He prepares Raja Harishchandra for its first public screening. The film is screened at the Coronation Cinema in Bombay on 3 May 1913. The screening attracts an audience and establishes Phalke as the maker of India's first full-length Indian feature film.

Following the success of the screening, Phalke and his family celebrate the achievement. The film concludes with Phalke continuing his work in filmmaking, while his efforts have established the foundation for the growth of Indian cinema.

== Cast ==
- Nandu Madhav as Dadasaheb Phalke
- Vibhavari Deshpande as Saraswati Phalke
- Sandeep Pathak as Trymbak B. Telang
- Atharva Karve as Mahadev Phalke
- Mohit Gokhale as Bhalchandra Phalke
- Bhalchandra Kadam as Deaf and dumb actor
- Vaibhav Mangle as Gajabhau
- Mayur Khandge as Anna Salunke
- Ambarish Deshpande as Sane
- Satish Alekar as Lawyer (Special Appearance)
- Jitendra Joshi as Parsi in theatre in beginning of movie (Special Appearance)
- Ketaki Thatte as Parsi lady
- Hrishikesh Joshi as School Teacher in beginning of Movie (Special Appearance)
- Pravin Tarde as Shankar Carpenter
- Madhugandha Kulkarni as Laila
- Vishakha Subhedar as Prostitute's mother
- Justin MacRae as British sea captain
- Amey Wagh as Handbill boy
- Nipun Dharmadhikari as Toy seller
- Kaluram Dhobale as Parsi Baba
- Ganesh Mayekar as Ganu
- Aastad Kale as 1st Streeparti
- Aniruddha Joshi as 2nd Streeparti
- Abhay Mahajan as 3rd Streeparti
- Mangesh Bhide as Abdulla
- Hemu Adhikari as Saraswati's father
- Pratibha Date as Saraswati's mother
- Hrishikesh Joshi as Pahila Bandhu
- Uday Lagoo as Dusra Bandhu
- Shrirang Godbole as Pahila Sanatani
- Dharmakirti Sumant as Dusra Sanatani
- Ketan Karande as Mr. Deshmukh
- Sandeep Mehta as Parikh
- Lee Macsween as British Inspector
- Siddharth Beninger as English Projectionist
- Dilip Joglekar as Mr. Barve
- Anil Bhagwat as Tatya
- Sachin Deshpande as Dr. Prabhakar
- Vivek Gore as D. D. Dabke
- Dheeresh Joshi as Mr. Nadkarni
- Gary Tantony as Capebourn
- Gary Richardson as Hepworth
- Pradeep Joshi as Joshi Petiwale
- Suhas Shirsat as Painter
- Chinmay Patwardhan as Nath
- Ashish Bende as Eunuch
- Smita Tambe as Prostitute
- Ketaki Saraf as 2nd Prostitute
- Shripad Amle as Mr. Chitre

== Critical reception ==
The film was officially released in India on 29 January 2010 and received critical appreciation.

== Awards and honours ==
Year	Award	Category	Recipient(s)	Result	Ref.
2008	56th National Film Awards	Best Feature Film in Marathi	Harishchandrachi Factory	Won	
2008	SIGNS: John Abraham Awards	Best Feature Film	Harishchandrachi Factory	Won	
2009	Ahmedabad International Film Festival	Best Feature Film	Harishchandrachi Factory	Won	
2009	18th Aravindan Puraskaram	Best Debutant Director	Paresh Mokashi	Won	
2009	Balasaheb Sarpotdar Award	Best Feature Film	Harishchandrachi Factory	Won	
2009	Gollapudi Srinivas Award	Best Debutant Director	Paresh Mokashi	Won	
2009	14th International Film Festival of Kerala	Hassan Kutty Award for Best Debut Indian Film	Harishchandrachi Factory	Won	
2009	India's Official entry	Academy Award for Best Foreign Language Film	Harishchandrachi Factory	Nominated	
2009	1st International Film Festival Kolhapur	Public Choice Award	Harishchandrachi Factory	Won	
2009	46th Maharashtra State Film Awards	Best Feature Film	Harishchandrachi Factory	Won	
2009	46th Maharashtra State Film Awards	Best Director	Paresh Mokashi	Won	
2009	46th Maharashtra State Film Awards	Best Art Direction	Nitin Chandrakant Desai	Won	
2009	Marathi International Film and Theatre Awards	Best Screenplay	Paresh Mokashi	Won	
2009	Pune International Film Festival	Best Director (Marathi Section)	Paresh Mokashi	Won	
2010	Indian Film Festival of Los Angeles	Audience Choice Awards	Harishchandrachi Factory	Won	
