= History of cinema of India =

The history of cinema in India extends to the beginning of the film era. Following the screening of the Lumière and Robert Paul moving pictures in London in 1896, commercial cinematography became a worldwide sensation and these films were shown in Bombay (now Mumbai) that same year.

== Silent era (1890s–1920s) ==
In 1897, a film presentation by filmmaker Professor Stevenson featured a stage show at Calcutta's Star Theatre. With Stevenson's camera and encouragement, Indian photographer Hiralal Sen filmed scenes from that show, exhibited as The Flower of Persia (1898). The Wrestlers (1899), by H. S. Bhatavdekar, showing a wrestling match at the Hanging Gardens in Bombay, was the first film to be shot by an Indian and the first Indian documentary film. From 1913 to 1931, all the movies made in India were silent films, which had no sound and had intertitles.

History of Indian cinema

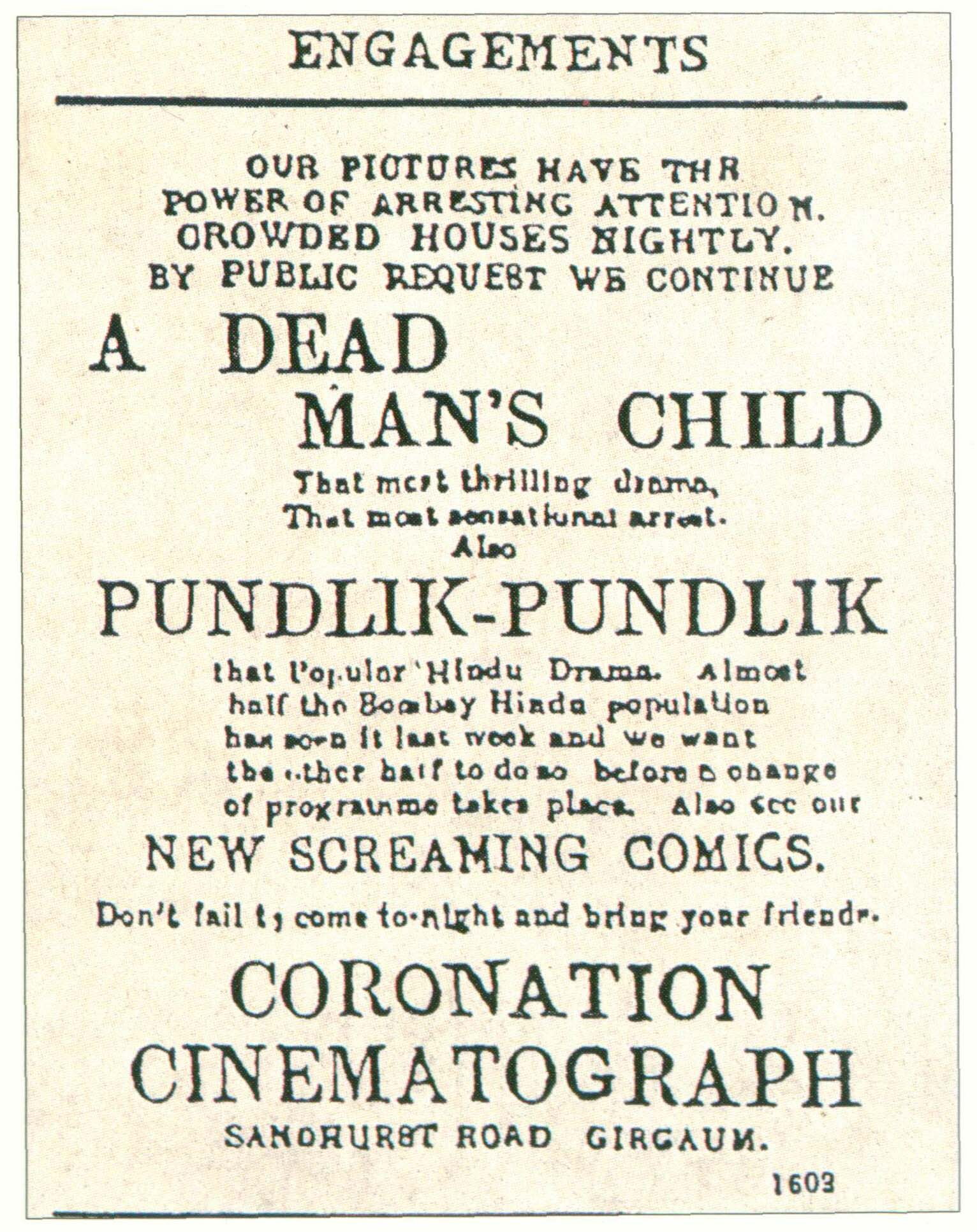
Newspaper ad for Shree Pundalik

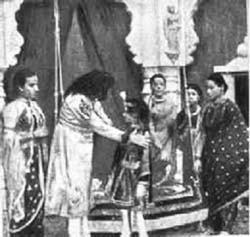
A scene from Raja Harishchandra

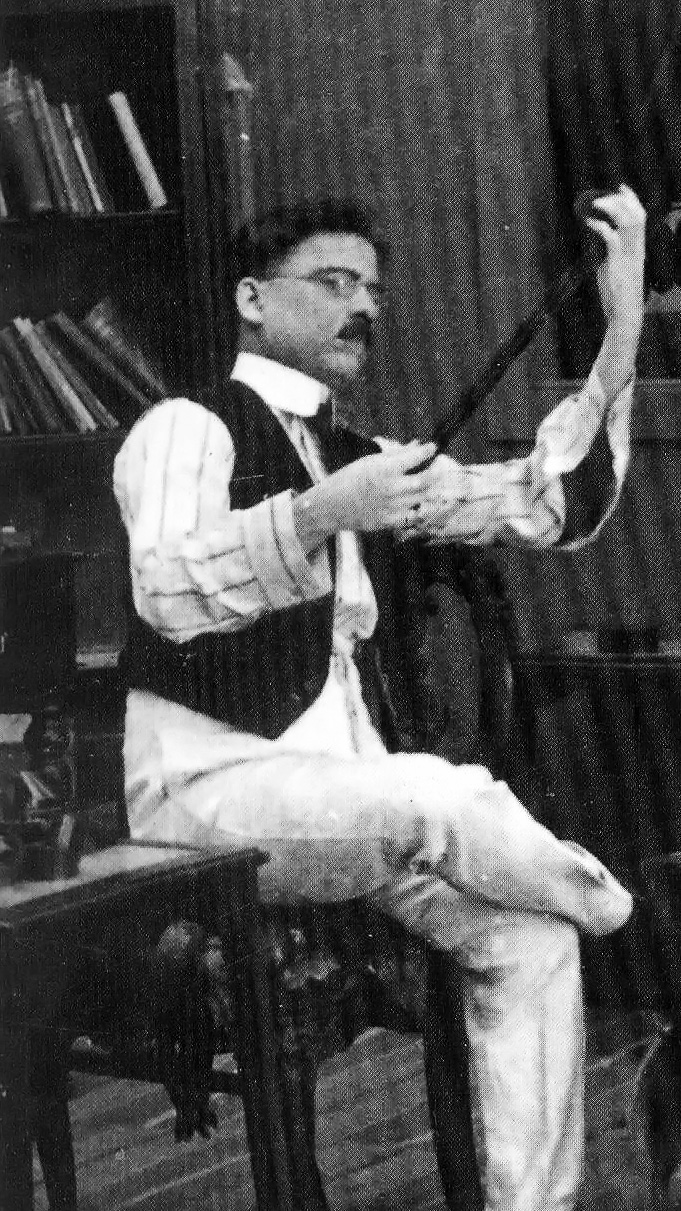
Dadasaheb Phalke, c. 1930s

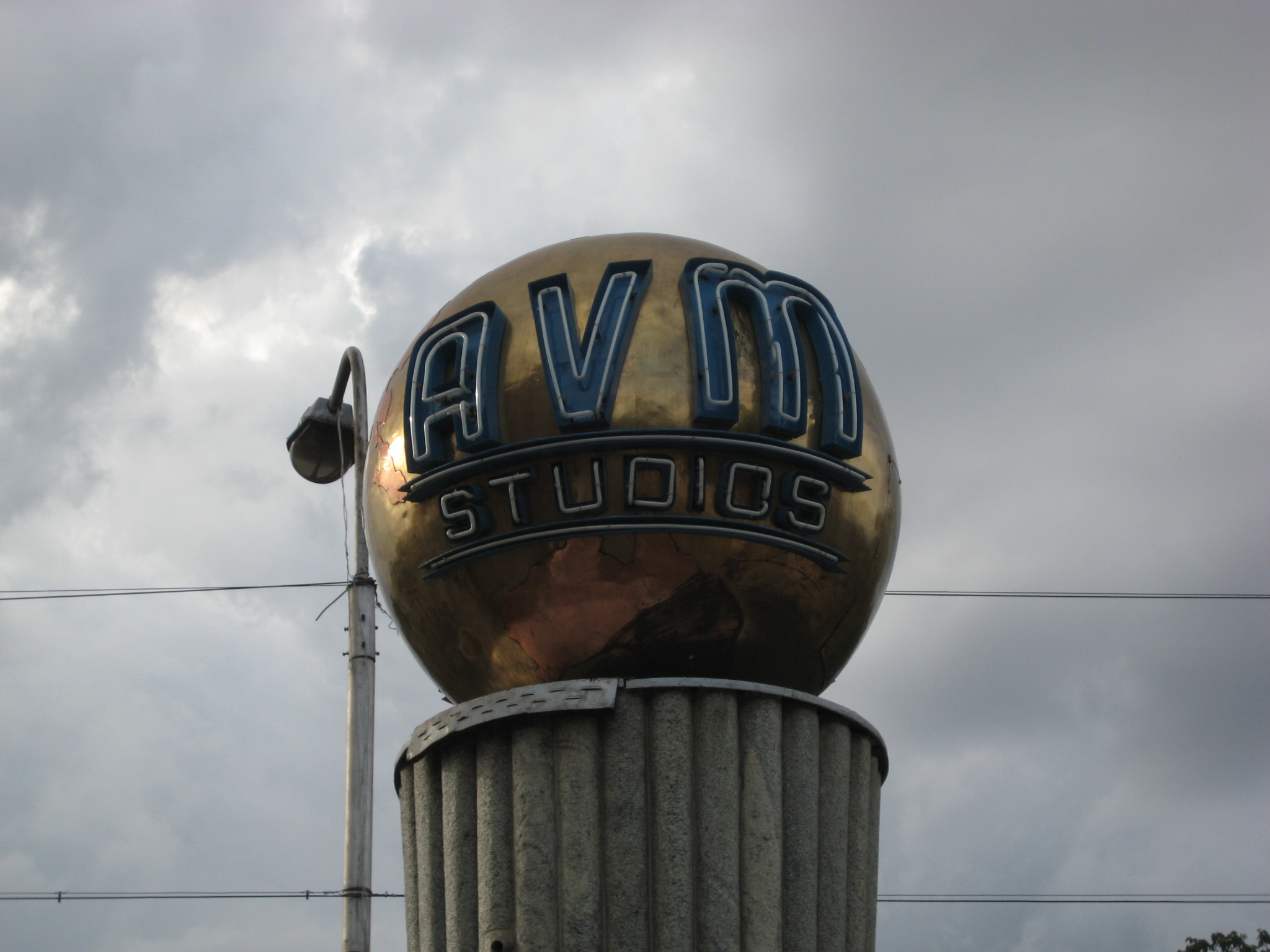
AVM Studios globe

In 1913, Dadasaheb Phalke released Raja Harishchandra (1913) in Bombay, the first film made in India. It was a silent film incorporating English, Marathi, and Hindi intertitles. It was premiered in Coronation cinema in Girgaon.

Although some claim Shree Pundalik (1912) of Dadasaheb Torne as the first film ever made in India, some film scholars have argued that Pundalik was not a true Indian film because it was simply a recording of a stage play, filmed by a British cameraman and it was processed in London. Raja Harishchandra of Phalke had a story based on Hindu Sanskrit legend of Harishchandra, a truthful King and its success led many to consider him a pioneer of Indian cinema. Phalke used an all Indian crew including actors Anna Salunke and D. D. Dabke. He directed, edited, processed the film himself. Phalke saw The Life of Christ (1906) by the French director Alice Guy-Blaché, While watching Jesus on the screen, Phalke envisioned Hindu deities Rama and Krishna instead and decided to start in the business of "moving pictures".

In South India, film pioneer Raghupathi Venkaiah Naidu, credited as the father of Telugu cinema, built the first cinemas in Madras (now Chennai), and a film studio was established in the city by Nataraja Mudaliar. In 1921, Naidu produced the silent film, Bhishma Pratigna, generally considered to be the first Telugu feature film.

The first Tamil and Malayalam films, also silent films, were Keechaka Vadham (1917–1918, R. Nataraja Mudaliar) and Vigathakumaran (1928, J. C. Daniel Nadar). The latter was the first Indian social drama film and featured the first Dalit-caste film actress.

The first chain of Indian cinemas, Madan Theatre, was owned by Parsi entrepreneur Jamshedji Framji Madan, who oversaw the production and distribution of films for the chain. These included film adaptations from Bengal's popular literature and Satyawadi Raja Harishchandra (1917), a remake of Phalke's influential film.

Films steadily gained popularity across India as affordable entertainment for the masses (admission as low as an anna [one-sixteenth of a rupee] in Bombay). Young producers began to incorporate elements of Indian social life and culture into cinema, others brought new ideas from across the world. Global audiences and markets soon became aware of India's film industry.

In 1927, the British government, to promote the market in India for British films over American ones, formed the Indian Cinematograph Enquiry Committee. The ICC consisted of three British and three Indians, led by T. Rangachari, a Madras lawyer. This committee failed to bolster the desired recommendations of supporting British Film, instead recommending support for the fledgling Indian film industry, and their suggestions were set aside.

== Sound era ==
The first Indian sound film was Alam Ara (1931) made by Ardeshir Irani. Ayodhyecha Raja (1932) was the first sound film of Marathi cinema. Irani also produced South India's first sound film, the Tamil–Telugu bilingual talking picture Kalidas (1931, H. M. Reddy).

The first Telugu film with audible dialogue, Bhakta Prahlada (1932), was directed by H. M. Reddy, who directed the first bilingual (Telugu and Tamil) talkie Kalidas (1931). East India Film Company produced its first Telugu film, Savitri (1933, C. Pullayya), adapted from a stage play by Mylavaram Bala Bharathi Samajam. The film received an honorary diploma at the 2nd Venice International Film Festival. Chittoor Nagayya was one of the first multilingual filmmakers in India.

Jumai Shasthi was the first Bengali short film as a talkie.

Jyoti Prasad Agarwala made his first film Joymoti (1935) in Assamese, and later made Indramalati. The first film studio in South India, Durga Cinetone, was built in 1936 by Nidamarthi Surayya in Rajahmundry, Andhra Pradesh. The advent of sound to Indian cinema launched musicals such as Indra Sabha and Devi Devyani, marking the beginning of song-and-dance in Indian films. By 1935, studios emerged in major cities such as Madras, Calcutta and Bombay as filmmaking became an established industry, exemplified by the success of Devdas (1935). The first colour film made in India was Kisan Kanya (1937, Moti B). Viswa Mohini (1940) was the first Indian film to depict the Indian movie-making world.

Swamikannu Vincent, who had built the first cinema of South India in Coimbatore, introduced the concept of "tent cinema" in which a tent was erected on a stretch of open land to screen films. The first of its kind was in Madras and called Edison's Grand Cinema Megaphone. This was due to the fact that electric carbons were used for motion picture projectors. Bombay Talkies opened in 1934 and Prabhat Studios in Pune began production of Marathi films. Sant Tukaram (1936) was the first Indian film to be screened at an international film festival, at the 1937 edition of the Venice Film Festival. The film was judged one of the three best films of the year. However, while Indian filmmakers sought to tell important stories, the British Raj banned Wrath (1930) and Raithu Bidda (1938) for broaching the subject of the Indian independence movement.

The Indian Masala film—a term used for mixed-genre films that combined song, dance, romance, etc.—arose following the Second World War. During the 1940s, cinema in South India accounted for nearly half of India's cinema halls, and cinema came to be viewed as an instrument of cultural revival. The Indian People's Theatre Association (IPTA), an art movement with a communist inclination, began to take shape through the 1940s and the 1950s. IPTA plays, such as Nabanna (1944), prepared the ground for realism in Indian cinema, exemplified by Khwaja Ahmad Abbas's Dharti Ke Lal (Children of the Earth, 1946). The IPTA movement continued to emphasise realism in films Mother India (1957) and Pyaasa (1957), among India's most recognisable cinematic productions.

Following independence, the 1947 partition of India divided the nation's assets and a number of studios moved to Pakistan. Partition became an enduring film subject thereafter. The Indian government had established a Films Division by 1948, which eventually became one of the world's largest documentary film producers with an annual production of over 200 short documentaries, each released in 18 languages with 9,000 prints for permanent film theatres across the country.

== Golden Age (late 1940s–1960s) ==
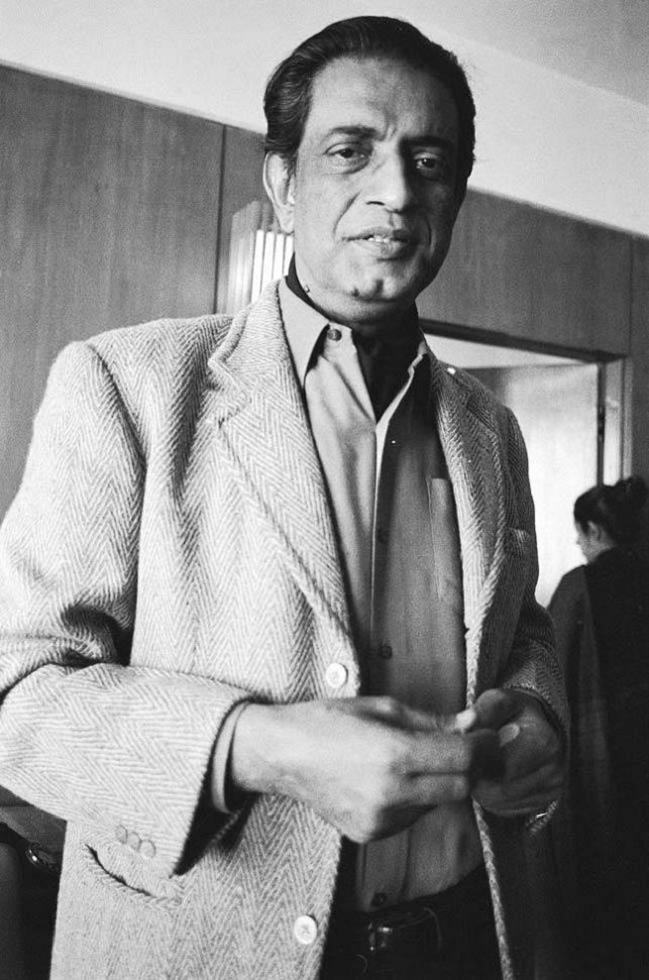
Satyajit Ray is recognised as one of the greatest filmmakers of the 20th century.

The period from the late 1940s to the early 1960s is regarded by film historians as the Golden Age of Indian cinema. This period saw the emergence of the parallel cinema movement, which emphasised social realism. Mainly led by Bengalis, early examples include Dharti Ke Lal (1946, Khwaja Ahmad Abbas), Neecha Nagar (1946, Chetan Anand), Nagarik (1952, Ritwik Ghatak) and Do Bigha Zamin (1953, Bimal Roy), laying the foundations for Indian neorealism

The Apu Trilogy (1955–1959, Satyajit Ray) won prizes at several major international film festivals and firmly established the parallel cinema movement. It was influential on world cinema and led to a rush of coming-of-age films in art house theatres. Cinematographer Subrata Mitra developed the technique of bounce lighting, to recreate the effect of daylight on sets, during the second film of the trilogy and later pioneered other effects such as the photo-negative flashbacks and X-ray digressions.

During the 1950s, Indian cinema reportedly became the world's second largest film industry, earning a gross annual income of ₹250 million (equivalent to ₹26 billion or US$270 million in 2023) in 1953. The government created the Film Finance Corporation (FFC) in 1960 to provide financial support to filmmakers. While serving as Information and Broadcasting Minister of India in the 1960s, Indira Gandhi supported the production of off-beat cinema through the FFC.

Baburao Patel of Filmindia called B. N. Reddy's Malliswari (1951) an "inspiring motion picture" which would "save us the blush when compared with the best of motion pictures of the world". Film historian Randor Guy called Malliswari scripted by Devulapalli Krishnasastri a "poem in celluloid, told with rare artistic finesse, which lingers long in the memory".

Commercial Hindi cinema began thriving, including acclaimed films Pyaasa (1957) and Kaagaz Ke Phool (1959, Guru Dutt) Awaara (1951) and Shree 420 (1955, Raj Kapoor). These films expressed social themes mainly dealing with working-class urban life in India; Awaara presented Bombay as both a nightmare and a dream, while Pyaasa critiqued the unreality of city life.

Epic film Mother India (1957, Mehboob Khan) was the first Indian film to be nominated for the US-based Academy of Motion Picture Arts and Sciences' Academy Award for Best Foreign Language Film and defined the conventions of Hindi cinema for decades. It spawned a new genre of dacoit films. Gunga Jumna (1961, Dilip Kumar) was a dacoit crime drama about two brothers on opposite sides of the law, a theme that became common in Indian films in the 1970s. Madhumati (1958, Bimal Roy) popularised the theme of reincarnation in Western popular culture.

Actor Dilip Kumar rose to fame in the 1950s, and was the biggest Indian movie star of the time. He was a pioneer of method acting, predating Hollywood method actors such as Marlon Brando. Much like Brando's influence on New Hollywood actors, Kumar inspired Hindi actors, including Amitabh Bachchan, Naseeruddin Shah, Shah Rukh Khan and Nawazuddin Siddiqui.

Neecha Nagar (1946) won the Palme d'Or at Cannes and Indian films competed for the award most years in the 1950s and early 1960s. Ray is regarded as one of the greatest auteurs of 20th century cinema, along with his contemporaries Dutt and Ghatak. In 1992, the Sight & Sound Critics' Poll ranked Ray at No. 7 in its list of Top 10 Directors of all time. Multiple films from this era are included among the greatest films of all time in various critics' and directors' polls, including The Apu Trilogy, Jalsaghar, Charulata Aranyer Din Ratri, Pyaasa, Kaagaz Ke Phool, Meghe Dhaka Tara, Komal Gandhar, Awaara, Baiju Bawra, Mother India, Mughal-e-Azam and Subarnarekha (also tied at No. 11).

Sivaji Ganesan became India's first actor to receive an international award when he won the Best Actor award at the Afro-Asian film festival in 1960 and was awarded the title of Chevalier in the Legion of Honour by the French Government in 1995. Tamil cinema is influenced by Dravidian politics, with prominent film personalities C N Annadurai, M G Ramachandran, M Karunanidhi and Jayalalithaa becoming Chief Ministers of Tamil Nadu.
