= Satyavadi Raja Harishchandra =

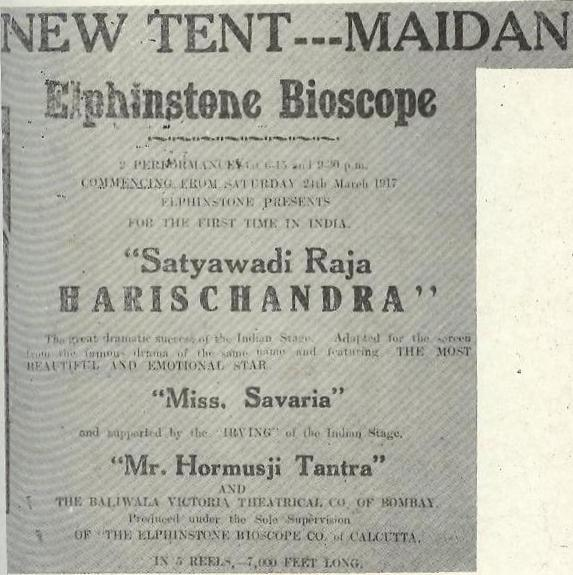
- Poster of Satyawadi Raja Harishchandra. It is credited as the first Bengali feature film. This movie released in March 24, 1917 at Cornwallis Theatre in Calcutta.
- Directed by: Dhundiraj Govind Phalke
- Written by: Dhundiraj Govind Phalke
- Story by: Ranchhodbai Udayram
- Starring: D. D. Dabke, Bhalachandra D. Phalke, Anna Salunke
- Cinematography: Dhundiraj Govind Phalke, Trymbak B. Telang
- Release date: 1917
- Running time: 16 minutes
- Country: India
- Languages: Silent film Marathi intertitles

Satyavadi Raja Harishchandra (Marathi: सत्यवादी राजा हरिश्चंद्र; English: Truthful King Harishchandra) is a 1917 silent black and white Indian short film directed and produced by Dhundiraj Govind Phalke. The film is a shorter version of the first Indian feature film, Raja Harishchandra (1913), also directed and produced by Phalke. The intertitles used in the film were in Marathi language as the film was a silent film. The film is based on the mythological story of a Hindu King Harishchandra, the 36th king of the Solar Dynasty, who donated his entire kingdom and sold himself and his family to keep the promise given to the sage Vishvamitra in the dream.

== Plot ==
The film depicts the story of a Hindu King Harishchandra, the 36th king of the Solar Dynasty. The Hindu sage Vishwamitra reminds Harishchandra of his promise of donating his kingdom, given to the sage in his dream. Known for keeping his promises, Harishchandra donates as desired by sage. Vishwamitra demands that in order to complete the act of donation, an additional amount as "Dakshina" (honorarium) should be paid. Being empty handed now, Harishchandra sells his wife Taramati, son Rohitashwa and himself to get the required amount. The king leaves for Varanasi as after donating his kingdom, it becomes the only place outside the influence of the sage.

King, now taking the form of a commoner, gets tested for his morals at several incidents but pleased with his virtue; the gods and the sage restore king's former glory, and further offers heavenly abode to the king, the queen and all their subjects.

== Cast ==
D. D. Dabke, a Marathi stage actor played the lead role of Harischandra. The female lead role of Taramati, Harischandra's wife was played by a male actor Anna Salunke. Phalke's son Bhalachandra was the child artist who donned the role of Rohitash, son of Harischandra. Sage Vishwamitra's role was played by G. V. Sane. The story was an adaptation from the Hindu mythology and was scripted by Ranchhodbai Udayram and Dada Saheb Phalke. Other artists in the film were:

- Dattatreya Kshirsagar
- Dattatreya Telang
- Ganpat G. Shinde
- Vishnu Hari Aundhkar
- Nath T. Telang

== Production ==
Dhundiraj Govind Phalke, popularly addressed as a mark of respect as Dada Saheb Phalke, who eventually came to don the title "father of Indian Cinema", was the director, script writer and producer of the film. He started a studio in Dadar Main Road. He wrote the screen play, and created the sets for the film and started shooting the film himself. The film was Dada's first feature film venture of full length of the film of 3700 ft (in four reels) and it took seven months 21 days to complete the film. The film was screened at the Coronation Cinema in 1917 before invited audience of the representatives of the press and guests. The film received wide acclaim and was a commercial success. Phalke followed it up by making films such as Satyavan Savithri, Lanka Dhahan (1917), Sri Krisna Janma (1918), and Kalia Mardan (1919).

Some historians believe that the presumed available prints of India's first feature film Raja Harishchandra (1913) are actually of Satyavadi Raja Harishchandra.

== Bibliography ==
- Rao, Haludodderi Narasinga Narahari (2006). The most memorable films of the world: from the diaries of the film societies. Sibina Services. p. 244.
- Banker, Ashok (2002). Bollywood. University of Michigan Press. p. 132. ISBN 9780143028352.
- Vasudev, Aruna (1995). Frames of mind: reflections on Indian cinema. University of Michigan Press. p. 324. ISBN 9788174760531.
- Gulzar; Nihalani, Govind; Chatterjee, Saibal (2003). Encyclopaedia Of Hindi Cinema. Popular Prakashan. p. 659. ISBN 9788179910665.
- Dawar, Ramesh (2006). Bollywood Yesterday Today and Tomorrow. Star Publications. p. 144. ISBN 978-1-905863-01-3.
