= Satyawadi Raja Harishchandra =

1917 film by Rustomji Dhotiwala

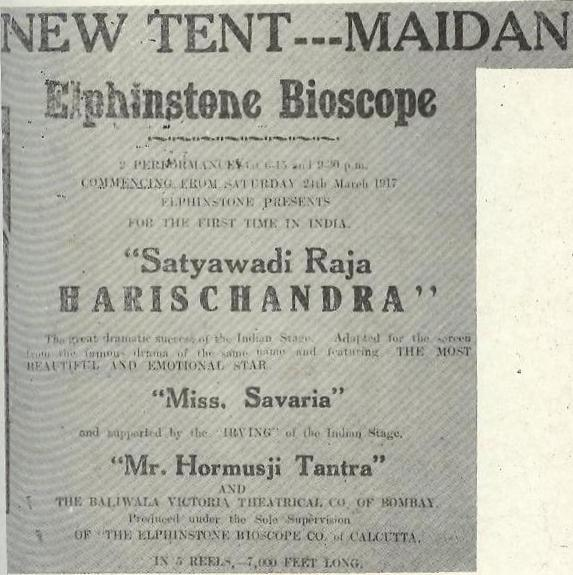
- A poster of the film released in the newspaper
- Directed by: Rustomji Dhotiwala
- Written by: Nityabodha Bidyaratna
- Produced by: Elphinstone Bioscope
- Starring: Hormusji Tantra, Savaria, Gaharjan, Behramshaw
- Cinematography: Jyotish Sarkar
- Distributed by: Madan Theatre
- Release date: 24 March 1917
- Running time: 120 minutes
- Country: India
- Languages: Silent film Bengali inter-titles

Satyawadi Raja Harishchandra (Bengali: সত্যবাদী রাজা হরিশচন্দ্র; English: Truthful King Harishchandra) is a 1917 silent black and white Indian film based on Hindu mythology, directed by Rustomji Dhotiwala. It was produced by J. F. Madan's Elphinstone Bioscope. Credited as the first remake in Indian cinema, the film is a remake of the first Indian feature film, Raja Harishchandra (1913) and was also inspired by an Urdu language drama, Harishchandra. The film is based on the mythological story of a Hindu King Harishchandra, the 36th king of the Solar Dynasty, who donated his entire kingdom and sold himself and his family to keep the promise given to the sage Vishvamitra in the dream. It is also the first feature film made in Calcutta. The intertitles used in the film were in Bengali language as the film was a silent film. The film was released on 24 March 1917 at New Tent Maidan, Calcutta.

== Plot ==
The Hindu sage Vishwamitra approaches king Harishchandra and informs him of a promise made by the king in the sage's dream to donate his entire kingdom. Being virtuous, Harishchandra immediately donates his entire kingdom to the sage and walks away with his wife Saibya and son Rohitashwa. As the entire world came under the control of the sage, after Harishchandra donated his kingdom, the king had to go to Varanasi, a holy town dedicated to Lord Shiva which was the only place outside the influence of the sage. As a part of donation, the sage claims an additional amount as "Dakshina" (honorarium) to be paid to complete the act of donation. As Harishchandra does not have anything left for himself, he sells his wife and son to a Brahmin family to pay for the Dakshina. However, the money collected was insufficient for sage and then Harishchandra sells himself to the guard at the cremation ground.

While working as a servant for the Brahmin family, Harishchandra's son gets bitten by a snake while plucking the flowers for his master's prayer, he then dies. Taramati takes his body to the cremation grounds where Harishchandra is working. She does not have sufficient money to pay to perform the rites and Harishchandra does not recognize his wife and son. He advises Taramati to sell off her Mangalsutra, a symbolism of marriage in India, to pay the amount for cremation. Having been granted the boon that only her husband can see her mangalsutra, Taramati recognizes Harishchandra and makes him aware of the happenings. Dutiful Harishchandra requests Taramati to pay the amount to finish the cremation and declines to accept mangalsutra as amount. Taramati then offers her only possession, a saree – her lone dress, a part of which was used to cover the dead body of her son.

Harishchandra accepts the offering but before he could start the cremation, the lord Vishnu (the supreme God in Hinduism), Indra (the lord of heaven in Hinduism) and several Hindu deities along with the sage Vishwamitra manifest themselves and praise Harishchandra for his perseverance and steadfastness. They bring Harishchandra's son back to life. They also offer the king and his wife instant places in heaven. Harishchandra refuses it stating that he is still bound to his master, the guard at the cremation ground. The sage Vishwamitra then reveals that the guard is Yama (the god of death in Hinduism) and Yama allows Harishchandra to accept the offer from Vishwamitra.

Being Kshatriya (the ruling and military elite of the Vedic-Hindu social system) Harishchandra still declines the offer saying that he cannot leave behind his subjects and requests heaven for all of them. The gods declines his offer to which Harishchandra suggests to pass on all his good virtues to his people so that they can rightfully accompany him to heaven. Pleased with Harishchandra, gods accepts his offer and offers heavenly abode to the king, the queen and all their subjects.

== Production ==
After the release of first Indian feature film Raja Harishchandra by Dadasaheb Phalke in 1913, no other production attempts were made in Indian cinema for the next four years. Phalke, however, made several short films and documentaries like Scenes of the River Godavari and Ahmadabad Congress, and also the feature film Mohini Bhasmasur in 1913 and Satyavan Savitri in 1914. J. F. Madan, who had formed two production companies in the beginning of the 1900s, decided to make a film. His first company, Elphinstone Bioscope, was a leading producer and distributor of foreign films in permanent and travelling cinema in India, whereas his second company, Madan Theaters Limited, was mainly involved in exhibition, distribution and production of Indian films during the silent era of film industry. Madan Theaters Limited eventually became India's largest film production-distribution-exhibition company and was also a noted importer of American films after World War I.

The film was inspired by an Urdu language drama, Harishchandra (written by Narain Prasad Betab). It was advertised as a "Photographed Play" with male lead Hormusji Tantra as "the 'Irving' of the Indian stage" and female lead Savaria, as "the most beautiful and emotional [sic] star".^{[Note]} The film also starred Italian artists Signor and Signora Manelli. Other members of the film were recruited from Baliwala Victoria Theatrical Company, a Parsi theater company based in Mumbai. The film was released on 24 March 1917 at New Tent Maidan, Calcutta. The film's running time was two hours. It was the longest Indian feature film made till 1931. The film had 5 reels having length of 7000 feet and was a 35 mm film. Pt. Nityabodha Bidyaratna wrote the screen play. The film was produced by J. F. Madan's Elphinstone Bioscope and was distributed by his another company, Madan Theaters Limited.
