= National Film Archive of India =

Public film archive in Pune, India

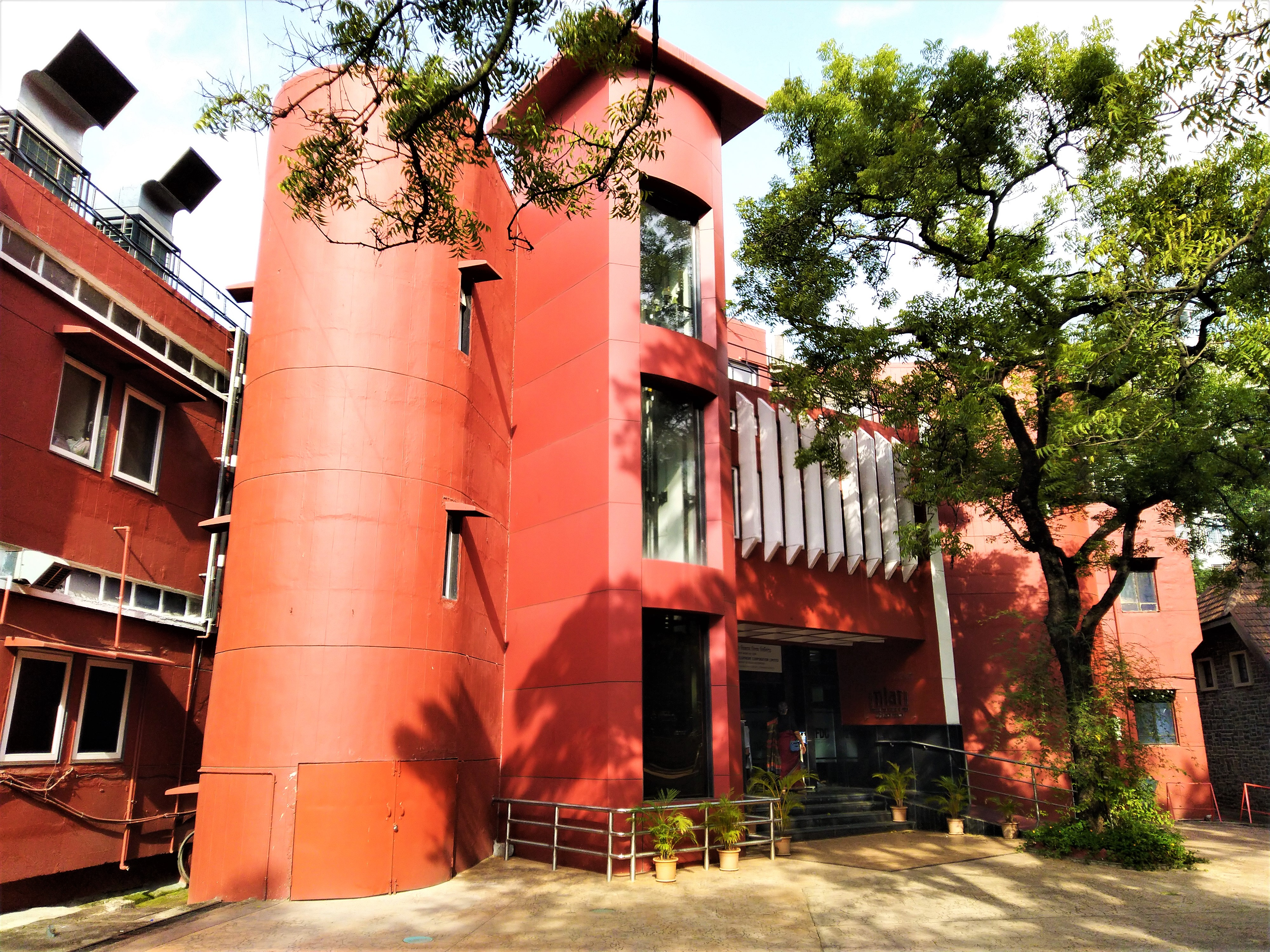
- NFAI building
- Established: February 1964
- Location: Law College Rd, Deccan Gymkhana, Pune, Maharashtra 411004, India
- Website: https://nfai.nfdcindia.com/

The National Film Archive of India (NFAI) was established as a media unit of the Ministry of Information and Broadcasting in February 1964. It was a member of the International Federation of Film Archives.

In March 2022, it was merged with the National Film Development Corporation.

== Objectives ==
Its three principal objectives are: to trace, acquire and preserve for posterity the heritage of Indian cinema; to classify, document data and undertake research relating to films; to act as a centre for the dissemination of film culture.

== Organization ==
With headquarters at Pune, Maharashtra, NFAI had three regional offices at Bangalore, Calcutta and Thiruvananthapuram. Developed from scratch by P. K. Nair, NFAI's activities related to the dissemination of film culture were manifold. Its distribution library consists of about 25 active members throughout the country and it also organizes joint screening programmes on a weekly, fortnightly and monthly basis in six important centres. The archive contains over 10,000 films, over 10,000 books, over 10,000 film scripts, and over 50,000 photographs. Another important programme conducted by the archive is the film teaching scheme comprising long and short-term film appreciation courses conducted in collaboration with the Film and Television Institute of India (FTII) and other educational and cultural institutions. At the international level, NFAI has supplied several Indian classics for major screening programmes.

The NFAI's archive keeps a stock of films, video cassettes, DVDs, books, posters, stills, press clippings, slides, audio CDs, and disc records of Indian cinema dating back to the 1910s.

== State of preservation ==
On 8 January 2003, a large fire caused a massive destruction in the vault of NFAI housed in the Prabhat Studio complex of FTII in Pune, in which unduplicated irreplaceable films with a nitrate base were destroyed. Ravi Shankar Prasad the then Minister of State, Ministry of Information and Broadcasting, Government of India announced in the Rajya Sabha that 607 films in 5,097 reels were lost in the fire. Among the greatest loss were films by Dadasaheb Phalke including: Raja Harishchandra (1913), Lanka Dahan (1917) and Kaliya Mardan (1919). Important films produced by Prabhat Film Company, Wadia Movietone, Bombay Talkies and New Theatres, were also gutted, namely: Bhakta Prahlada (1932), Amar Jyoti (1936), Manoos (1939), Aage Badho (1947) and others.

In March 2019, the Comptroller and Auditor General of India reported that 31,000 reels at the NFAI were reported lost or destroyed, when it audited the records between 1 May 2015, and 30 September 2017.
