= List of silent Indian Bengali films =

List of films produced in Silent Film in Bengali film industry in the Bengali language.

== 1917–1920 ==
Title	Director	Cast	Genre	Notes
1917
Satyawadi Raja Harishchandra	Rustomji Dhotiwala	Ms. Savaria, Mr. Hurmusjee Tantra, Ms. Gaharjan, Behramshaw	Drama	First Silent Bengali film. Released on March 24, 1917 at New Tent Maidan, Calcutta
1919
Billwamangal	Rustomji Dhotiwala	Ms. Kayoum Mamajiwala Gahar	Drama	
1920
Mahabharat	Rustomji Dhotiwala		Drama	B&W 8 Reel 35mm. Released on January 13, 1920 at Cornwallis

== 1921 in film ==
Title	Director	Cast	Genre	Notes
1921
Balika Badhu	Pandit Tulsidutt Saida	Pandit Tulsidutt Saida, Tarak Bagchi, Ms. Ali	Family film	B&W. Length 9 reels. 35mm. Released on April 11, 1921 at Cornwallis.
Bilat Ferat	Nitish Lahiri	Dhirendranath Gangopadhyay (D. G.), Manmatha Pal, Kunjalal Chakraborty, Sushila Mukhopadhyay, Nripen Bose, Nitish Lahiri, Sishubala	Family film	B&W. 6 Reels, 35mm. Released on February 26, 1921 at Russa Theatre.
Bishnu Abatar	Jyotish Bandyopadhyay	Patience Cooper	Drama	B&W. 4 Reels, 35mm. Released on June 4, 1921 at Cornwallis.
Dabbur Kelenkari	Debi Ghosh	Chani Dutta		B&W. 2 Reels, 35mm. Released on August 13, 1921 at Russa Theatre.
Dhruba Charitra	Jyotish Bandyopadhyay; Eugenio de Liguoro	Patience Cooper, Master Mohan, Signora Dorros, James Magarth, Master Manilal, Dadibhai Sarkari, Aga Hashr Kashmiri, Mrs. Manelli, P. Manelli, Master Surajram, Khorshedji Bilimoria, Jashodna Singh, Cawasji Golla, Isaac Simon, Ardeshir Sanjana		B&W. 8 Reels, 35mm. Released on April 16, 1921 at Cornwallis.
Maa Durga	Jyotish Bandyopadhyay			B&W. 7 Reels, 35mm. Released on October 15, 1921 at Cornwallis.
Nal Damayanti	Jyotish Bandyopadhyay; Eugenio de Liguoro	Patience Cooper, Keki Adajania, Dadibhai Sarkari, Signor Manelli, Master Mohan, Khorshedji Bilimoria, Manchersha Chapgar, Eugenio de Liguoro, Signorina Manelli		
Ratnakar	Surendranarayan Ray	Chunilal Deb, Sashimukhi, Sushibala		
Shibaratri	Priyanath Gangopadhyay	Prabodh Bose, Gopal Das, Kusumkumari, Basantakumari, Signor P. Mannelli, Signorina F. Mannelli		

== 1922 in film ==
Title	Director	Cast	Genre	Notes
1922
Aandhare Alo			Drama films	
Bhagirath Ganga			Drama films	
Bhishma (1922 film)			Drama films	
Bidyasundar			Drama films	
Bishabriksha (1922 film)			Drama films	
Barer Bazar			Drama films	
Lady Teacher			Drama films	
Jashodanandan			Drama films	
Laila Majnu (1922 film)			Drama films	
Mohini (1922 film)			Drama films	
Nartaki Tara				
Ramayan (1922 film) (Serial in four parts)			Drama films	
Ratnabali			Drama films	
Sadhu Ki Shaitan			Drama films	
Soul of a Slave			Drama films	

== 1923 in film ==
Title	Director	Cast	Genre	Notes
1923
Bimata			Drama films	
Khokababu			Drama films	
Manbhanjan				
Matrisneha			Drama films	
Noorjahan			Drama films	

== 1924 in film ==
Title	Director	Cast	Genre	Notes
1924
Basantaprabha			Drama films	
Chandranath			Drama films	
Kamaie Kamini			Drama films	
Nabin Bharat			Drama films	
Paper Parinam			Drama films	
Patni Pratap (Serial)			Drama films	
Premanjali			Drama films	

== 1925 in film ==
Title	Director	Cast	Genre	Notes
1925
Misharrani			Drama films	
Sati Lakshmi			Drama films	

== 1926 in film ==
Title	Director	Cast	Genre	Notes
1926
Dharmapatni				
Jeler Meye				
Joydeb				
Krishnakanter Will				
Prafulla				

== 1927 in film ==
Title	Director	Cast	Genre	Notes
1927
Chandidas				
Durgeshnandini				
Jana				
Krishnasakha				
Punarjanma				
Shankaracharya				

== 1928 in film ==
Title	Director	Cast	Genre	Notes
1928
Bhranti				
Kelor Kirti				
Nishiddha Phal				
Sarala				
Shasti Ki Shanti				

== 1929 in film ==
Title	Director	Cast	Genre	Notes
1929
Apahrita				
Bangabala				
Bicharak (1929 film)				
Debdas (1929 film)				
Indira (1929 film)				
Jugalanguriya				
Kapalkundala (1929 film)				
Rajani				

== 1930 in film ==
Title	Director	Cast	Genre	Notes
1930
Srikanta (1930 film)	Tarakumar Bhaduri	Kanti Bandyopadhyay, Molina Devi		
Radharani (1930 film)	Jyotish Bandyopadhyay			
Mrinalini (1930 film)	Jyotish Bandyopadhyay			

== 1931 in film ==
Title	Director	Cast	Genre	Notes
1931
The Last Kiss	Ambuj Gupta	Lolita, Charubala Devi, Khaza Azmal, Khaza Nasrullah		

== 1932 in film ==
Title	Director	Cast	Genre	Notes
1932

== 1934 in film ==
Title	Director	Cast	Genre	Notes
1934
Niyoti	Jogesh Chowdhury	Sailen Chowdhury, Ajit Bhattacharya, Nripesh Ray, Kanti Bandyopadhyay, Sishubala, Hena Debi, Kamala Debi, Santoshil Goswami, Umashankar Mukhopadhyay		

== Gallery ==
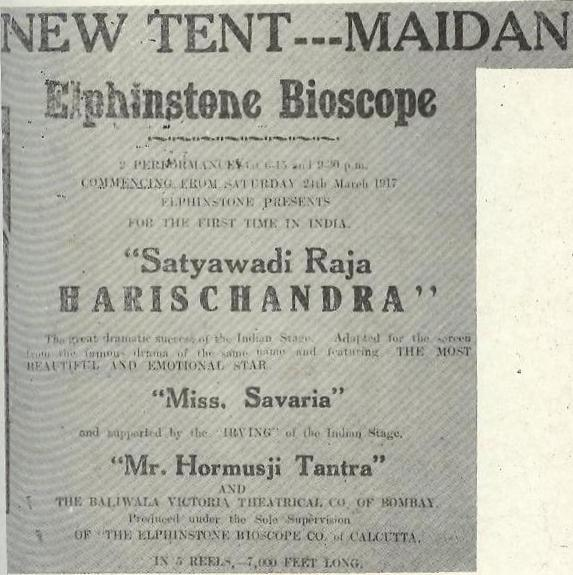
A poster of Satyawadi Raja Harishchandra

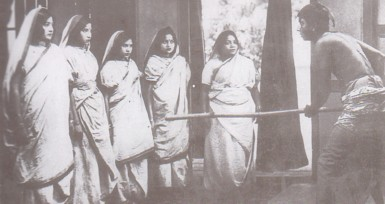
A scene from Dena Paona, 1931 - first Bengali talkie

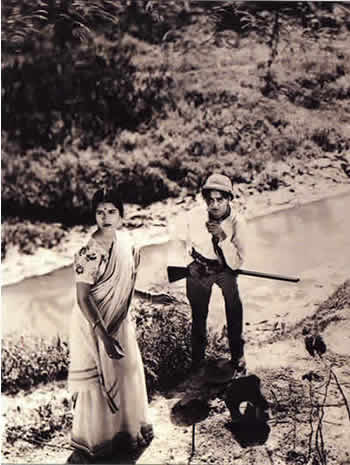

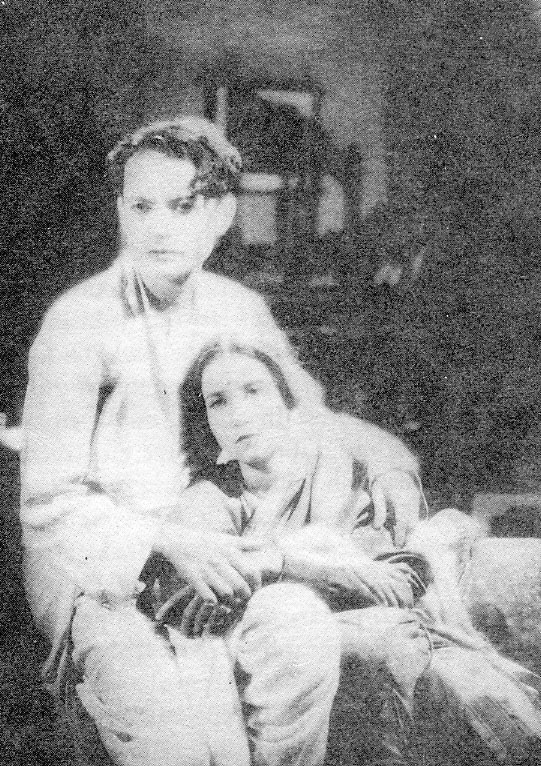

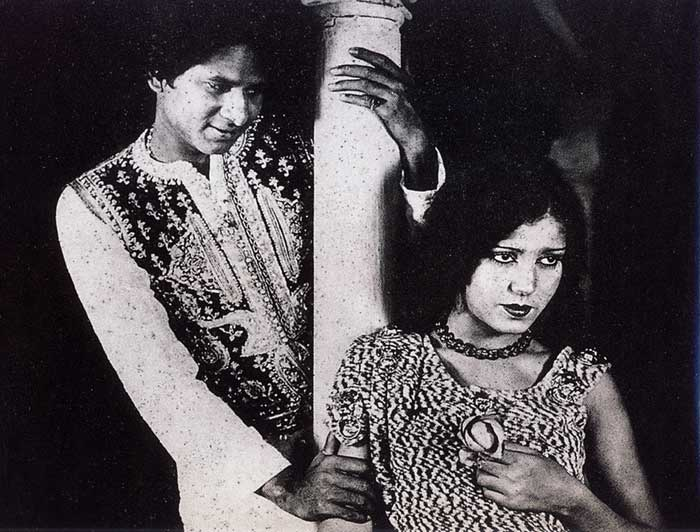

== See also ==
- Bengali Film Directory
