= Trymbak B. Telang =

Indian cinematographer

Trymbak B. Telang was an early Indian cinematographer. He was trained in the operation of the Williamson camera. He shot for films such as Raja Harishchandra (1913), Indian first full-length feature film and Satyavadi Raja Harishchandra and Lanka Dahan (1917).
