= Anna Salunke =

Indian film actor

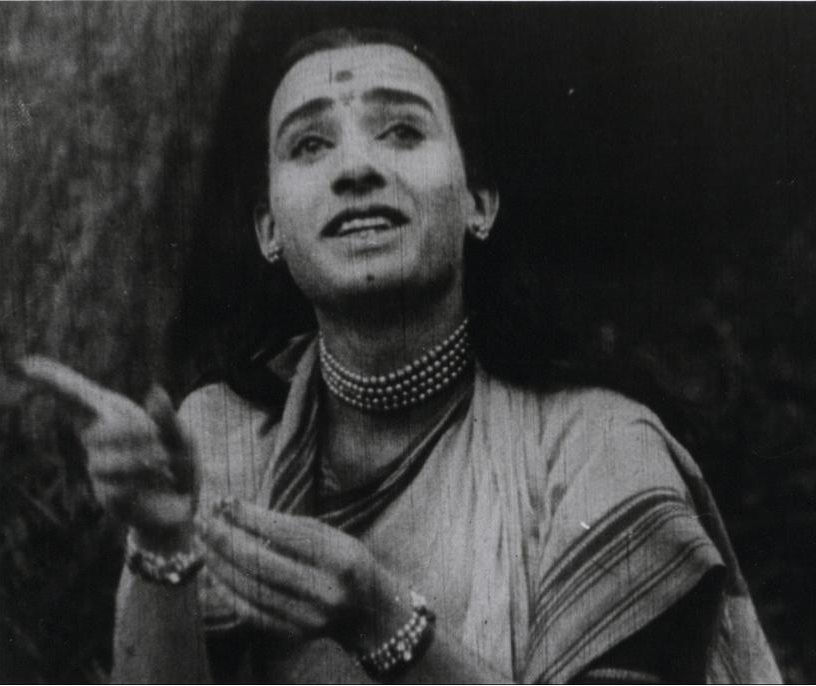
- Salunke as Sita in Lanka Dahan
- Born: c. 1897
- Died: 1944
- Occupations: Actor, cinematographer

Anna Hari Salunke (c. 1897-1944), also known as A. Salunke and Annasaheb Saluke, was an Indian actor who performed female roles in very early Indian cinema and also a cinematographer. He is the first person to perform as a heroine in Indian cinema, playing the role of Queen Taramati in Dada Saheb Phalke's first full-length film, Raja Harishchandra (1913). In 1917, Salunke became the first to play a double role in Indian cinema, by playing the roles of both the hero and heroine in Lanka Dahan.

== Career ==
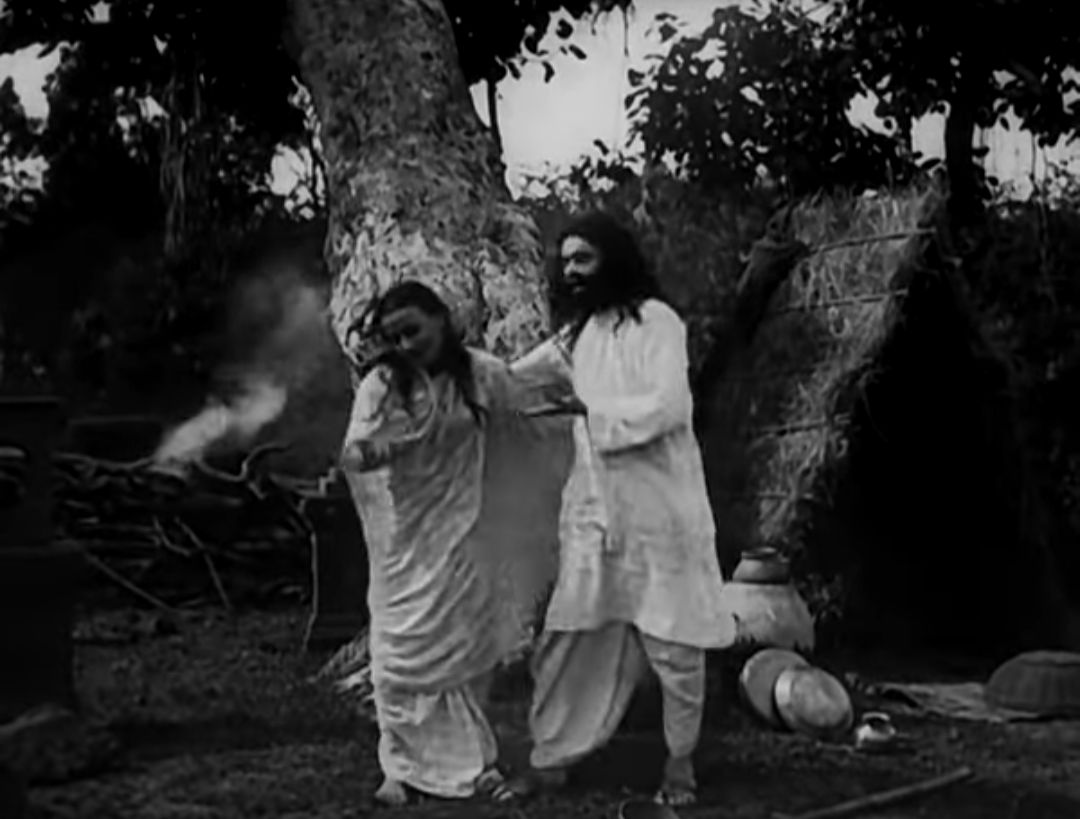
A scene from Raja Harishchandra (1913) depicting Anna Salunke as Taramati and Dattatraya Damodar Dabke as Harishchandra

Salunke portrayed the heroine in Raja Harishchandra (1913), the first full-length Indian feature film. He played the role of Queen Taramati, the consort of king Harishchandra, whose tale is told in Hindu mythology. Salunke worked as a cook or waiter in a restaurant on Grant Road, Mumbai, frequented by Dhundiraj Govind Phalke (Dadasaheb Phalke), the director and producer of the film. Phalke could not find a woman who agreed to act in the film; even prostitutes and dancing girls refused. Phalke saw Salunke, who had an effeminate figure and slender hands, and convinced him to play a female role. While Salunke was working for a monthly salary of 10 rupees, Phalke offered him 15 and Salunke agreed.

Salunke also acted in Phalke's Lanka Dahan (1917), played in the Hindu epic Ramayana. Salunke played the first double role in Indian cinema, by playing both the male role of the hero Rama and the female role of his wife Sita, the heroine. However, Salunke had developed a more muscular physique by then, and the audience could see his biceps even as he played the goddess Sita.

Salunke also acted in Satyanarayan (1922) directed by V.S. Nirantar and Phalke's Buddha Dev (1923). He was also the cinematographer on both films. Later, Salunke abandoned his acting career and fully concentrated on cinematography. Besides Nirantar and Phalke, he worked with G. V. Sane (who acted with Salunke in Raja Harishchandra) and Ganpat G. Shinde (co-starred with Salunke in Lanka Dahan) as directors. The last of his films as cinematographer were in 1931.

== Films ==
Salunke, during his film career spanning 18 years from 1913 to 1931, acted in various films including five in the female role, most of them were on Hindu mythological themes. He was also a cinematographer in a few films.

=== Selected filmography ===
In female roles

- Raja Harishchandra (1913)
- Satyavadi Raja Harishchandra (1917) as Taramati
- Lanka Dahan (1922) in a double role as Rama and Sita
- Satyanarayan (1922)
- Buddha Dev (1923), his last movie as an actress

In several roles

- Ahiravan Mahiravan Vadh (1922)
- Haritalika (1922)
- Pandav Vanavas (1922)
- Satyanarayan (1922)
- Shishupala Vadh (1922)
- Wandering Soul (1923)
- Buddha Dev (1923)
- Gora Kumbhar (1923)
- Guru Dronacharya (1923)
- Jarasandha Vadha (1923)
- Kanya Vikraya (1923)
- Jayadratha Vadh (1924)
- Kanya Vikraya (1924)
- Ram Ravan Yuddha (1924)
- Shivajichi Agryahun Sutaka (1924)
- Sundopasund (1924)
- Anant Vrat (1925)
- Kakashebanchya Dolyat Jhanjhanit Anjan (1925)
- Satyabhama (1925)
- Simantak Mani (1925)
- Datta Janma (1925)
- Bhakta Pralhad (1926)
- Bhim Sanjeevan (1926)
- Keechaka Vadh (1926)
- Sant Eknath (1926)
- Bhakta Sudama (1927)
- Draupadi Vastraharan (1927)
- Hanuman Janma (1927)
- Madalasa (1927)
- Vasantsena (1929)
- Khuda Parasta (1930)
- Amir Khan (1931)
