= Coronation Cinematograph and Variety Hall =

Coordinates: 18.953°N 72.813°E

Coronation Cinematograph and Variety Hall was a hall in the Girgaon area of south Mumbai, India, used for variety entertainment shows, dramas and to screen movies.

The first full-length Indian feature film, Raja Harischandra, was screened here, thus heralding the birth of the Indian film industry.

== Location and ownership ==
Coronation cinema, built in 1912 was located at Narayan chawl at the junctions of Sandhurst road and Khetwadi road in the Girgaum area of Mumbai. It was one of the so-called "Sandhurst road cinemas" of the 1910-1917 Bombay cinema era, during which this area hosted a number of cinema houses including Coronation, the American-India, the Olympia and the New Alhambra. The theatre was managed by Narayan Govind Chitre, a friend of the film maker Dadasaheb Torne.

== The screening of Raja Harischandra ==
Further information : Raja Harischandra (Movie)

On 3 May 1913 Raja Harishchandra (राजा हरिश्चंद्र), a silent Indian film directed and produced by Dadasaheb Phalke, was screened at Coronation cinema. The film was based on the legend of King Harishchandra, recounted in Ramayana and Mahabharata and was the first Indigenous Indian film.

== Other screenings and purposes of Coronation Cinema ==
Coronation cinema was also used for other variety entertainment shows such as dances (by Miss Irene Delmar), comical sketches like "The McClements", jugglery shows by Alexandroff, other Indian movies like Pundlik (made by Dadasaheb Torne) and dramas (A dead man's child).

== Current status ==
The theatre is no longer in existence. The area housed Majestic cinema for a few decades, which was replaced by an office complex.
