= Raja Harishchandra =

1913 film by Dadasaheb Phalke

Raja Harischandra
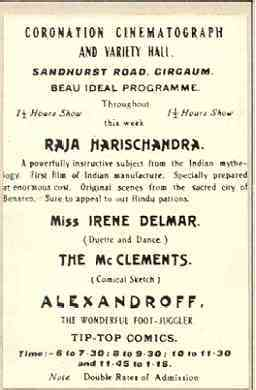
- Publicity poster for film show at the Coronation Cinematograph and Variety Hall, Girgaon
- Directed by: Dadasaheb Phalke
- Screenplay by: Dadasaheb Phalke
- Produced by: Dadasaheb Phalke
- Starring: Dattatraya Dabke; Anna Salunke; Bhalchandra Phalke; Gajanan Sane
- Cinematography: Trymbak B. Telang
- Edited by: Dadasaheb Phalke
- Production company: Phalke Films Company
- Release date: 21 April 1913
- Running time: 40 minutes
- Country: India
- Language: Silent

Raja Harishchandra (transl. King Harishchandra) is a 1913 Indian silent film directed and produced by Dadasaheb Phalke. It is often considered the first full-length Indian feature film. Raja Harishchandra features Dattatraya Damodar Dabke, Anna Salunke, Bhalchandra Phalke and Gajanan Vasudev Sane. It is based on the legend of Harishchandra, with Dabke portraying the title character. The film, being silent, had English, Marathi, and Hindi-language intertitles.

Phalke decided to make a feature film after watching The Life of Christ (1906) at a theatre in Bombay in April 1911. In February 1912, he went to London for two weeks to learn filmmaking techniques and upon return founded Phalke Films Company. He imported the hardware required for filmmaking and exhibition from England, France, Germany, and the United States. Phalke shot a short film Ankurachi Wadh (Growth of a Pea Plant) to attract investors for his venture. He published advertisements in various newspapers calling for the cast and crew. As no women were available to play female roles, male actors performed the female roles. Phalke was in charge of scriptment, direction, production design, make-up, film editing, along with film processing. Trymbak B. Telang handled the camera. Phalke completed filming in six months and 27 days producing a film of 3,700 feet (1,100 m), about four reels.

The film premiered at the Olympia Theatre, Bombay, on 21 April 1913, and had its theatrical release on 3 May 1913 at the Coronation Cinematograph and Variety Hall, Girgaon. It was a commercial success and laid the foundation for the film industry in the country. The film is partially lost; only the first and last reels of the film are preserved at the National Film Archive of India. Some film historians believe these belong to a 1917 remake of the film by Phalke titled Satyavadi Raja Harishchandra.

The status of Raja Harishchandra as the first full-length Indian feature film has been debated. Some film historians consider Dadasaheb Torne's silent film Shree Pundalik, released on 18 May 1912, the maiden Indian film. The Government of India, however, recognises Raja Harishchandra as the first Indian feature film.

== Plot ==
Raja Harishchandra

King Harishchandra is shown teaching his son, Rohitashva, how to shoot with a bow and arrow in the presence of Queen Taramati. His citizens ask him to go on a hunting expedition. While on the hunt, Harishchandra hears the cries of some women. He reaches a place where the sage Vishvamitra is performing a yajna to get help from Triguna Shakti (three powers) against their will. (Note: As per the Samkhya hindu philosophy, Prakṛti is one of two eternal principles. It is composed of three gunas (prime qualities): sattva, rajas, and tamas.) Harishchandra unwittingly interrupts Vishvamitra in the midst of his yajna by releasing the three powers. To appease Vishvamitra's wrath, Harishchandra offers his kingdom. Returning to the royal palace, he informs Taramati of the happenings. Vishvamitra sends Harishchandra, Taramati, and Rohitashva into exile and asks them to arrange for dakshina. While in exile, Rohitashva dies and Harishchandra sends Taramati to ask the Dom king for arranging a free cremation. While Taramati is on her way to meet the Dom king, Vishvamitra frames her for the murder of the prince of Kashi. Taramati faces trial, pleads guilty and is ordered to be beheaded by Harishchandra. As he raises his sword to complete his task, a pleased Lord Shiva appears. Vishvamitra reveals that he was examining Harishchandra's integrity, returns the crown to him and brings Rohitashva back to life.

== Cast ==
- Dattatraya Damodar Dabke as Harishchandra
- Anna Salunke as Taramati, Harishchandra's wife
- Bhalchandra Phalke as Rohitashva, son of Harishchandra and Taramati
- Gajanan Vasudev Sane as Vishvamitra

Other artists in the film were Dattatreya Kshirsagar, Dattatreya Telang, Ganpat G. Shinde, Vishnu Hari Aundhkar, and Nath T. Telang.

== Production ==
=== Development ===
"While The Life of Christ was rolling fast before my physical eyes, I was mentally visualising the Gods, Shri Krishna, Shri Ramachandra, their Gokul and their Ayodhya. I was gripped by a strange spell. I bought another ticket and saw the film again. This time I felt my imagination taking shape on the screen. Could this really happen? Could we, the sons of India, ever be able to see the Indian images on the screen?"

— Phalke on watching Jesus on the screen

On 14 April 1911, Dadasaheb Phalke with his elder son Bhalchandra went to see a film, Amazing Animals, at the America India Picture Palace, Girgaon. Surprised at seeing animals on the screen, Bhalchandra informed his mother, Saraswatibai, about his experience. None of the family members believed them, so Phalke took his family to see the film the next day. As it was Easter, the theatre screened a film about Jesus, The Life of Christ (1906) by the French director Alice Guy-Blaché. (Note: In one of the interviews, Phalke mentioned the day as Christmas of 1910. But, the issue of The Times of India of 14 April 1911 contains an advertisement of The Life of Christ.) While watching Jesus on the screen, Phalke envisioned Hindu deities Rama and Krishna instead and decided to start in the business of "moving pictures". After completing his two-week trip to London to learn filmmaking techniques, he founded Phalke Films Company on 1 April 1912.

During his London trip, Phalke had placed an order for a Williamson camera and Kodak raw films and a perforator which reached Bombay (now Mumbai) in May 1912. He set up a processing room and taught his family to perforate and develop the film. Though Phalke was certain of his idea of filmmaking, he could not find any investors. So, he decided to make a short film to demonstrate the techniques. He planted some peas in a pot, placed a camera in front of it, and shot one frame a day for over a month. This resulted in a film, lasting just over a minute, of the seed growing, sprouting, and changing into a climber. Phalke titled this short film Ankurachi Wadh (Growth of a Pea Plant) and showed it to selected individuals. Some of them, including Yashwantrao Nadkarni and Narayanrao Devhare, offered Phalke a loan.

=== Story ===
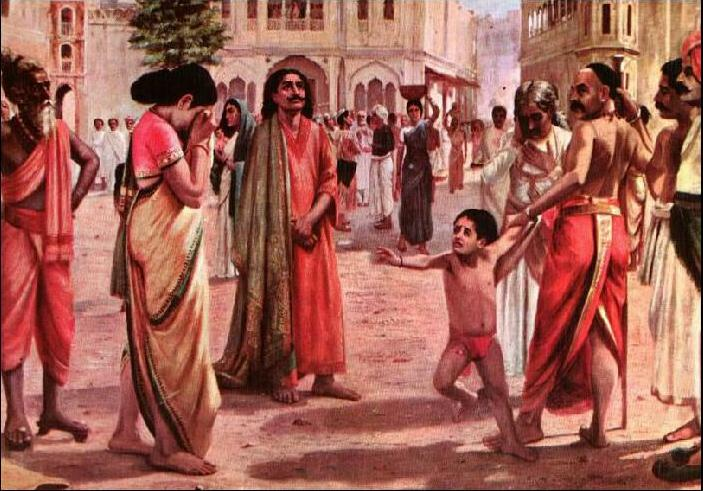
Painting by Raja Ravi Varma, depicting Harishchandra parting with his wife and son

In his Marathi language magazine Suvarnamala, Phalke had published a story Surabaichi Kahani (A Tale of Sura). The story, which depicted the ill effects of alcoholism, was the first he considered for filming. After watching several American films screened in Bombay, he observed that they included mystery and romance, which the audiences liked. His family members suggested that the storyline should appeal to middle-class people and women and it should also highlight Indian culture.

After considering various stories depicted in Hindu mythology, Phalke's family shortlisted the legends of Krishna, Savitri and Satyavan, and Harishchandra. At the time, a play based on the legends of Harishchandra was popular on Marathi and Urdu stages. Friends and neighbours had often called Phalke "Harishchandra" for having sold all his belongings, except his wife's mangala sutra, to fulfil his filmmaking dream. Thus, Phalke decided on the legends of Harishchandra and wrote the script for his feature film.

=== Casting ===
"Wanted actors, carpenters, washermen, barbers and painters. Bipeds who are drunkards, loafers or ugly should not bother to apply for actor. It would do if those who are handsome and without physical defect are dumb. Artistes must be good actors. Those who are given to immoral living or have ungainly looks or manners should not take pains to visit."

— Casting call published in various newspapers

Phalke published advertisements in various newspapers like Induprakash calling for the cast and crew required for the film. It was well-received and huge number of applicants came in for the auditions. (Note: Since Phalke was making a silent film, he also allowed mute artists to audition.) Despite a growing response to the advertisement, he was not satisfied with the performers' skills. He discontinued the advertisements and decided to scout for the artists through theatre companies.

Padurang Gadhadhar Sane and Gajanan Vasudev Sane were among the first artists to join Phalke Films Company. The former was playing female roles in the Natyakala theatre company; the latter was performing in Urdu plays. Both joined for a salary of ₹40 per month. Gajanan Sane introduced his acquaintance Dattatraya Damodar Dabke. Phalke was impressed with his physique and personality and offered him the lead role of Harishchandra.

In response to the advertisement, four prostitutes auditioned for the role of Taramati. Phalke rejected them for not having satisfactory looks and revised the advertisement to read: "Only good-looking women should come for interview." Two more prostitutes auditioned but left after two days. A young lady, who was a mistress, auditioned and Phalke selected her for the female lead. She rehearsed for four days. However, on the fifth day, her master objected to her working in the film and took her away. In despair, Phalke also visited Bombay's red-light area on Grant Road in Kamathipura. He was asked either to pay a high salary or to marry the woman. One day, while having tea at a restaurant on Grant Road, Phalke noticed Krishna Hari alias Anna Salunke, an effeminate young man with slender features and hands. Salunke was working as a cook or waiter at the restaurant on a monthly salary of ₹10. He agreed to work in films when Phalke offered him a raise of five rupees. (Note: Salunke later reprised the same role in Phalke's 1917 film Satyavadi Raja Harishchandra. Later, he also became the first actor to play the double role in Indian cinema by portraying the male lead Rama and his wife Sita, in Phalke's 1917 film Lanka Dahan.)

Phalke auditioned many boys for the role of Rohitashva, son of Harishchandra and Taramati, but none of the parents would allow their children to work in the film as the character would have to live in the forests and was to die. Finally, Phalke's elder son Bhalchandra was assigned the role, becoming the first child actor in Indian cinema.

=== Pre-production ===
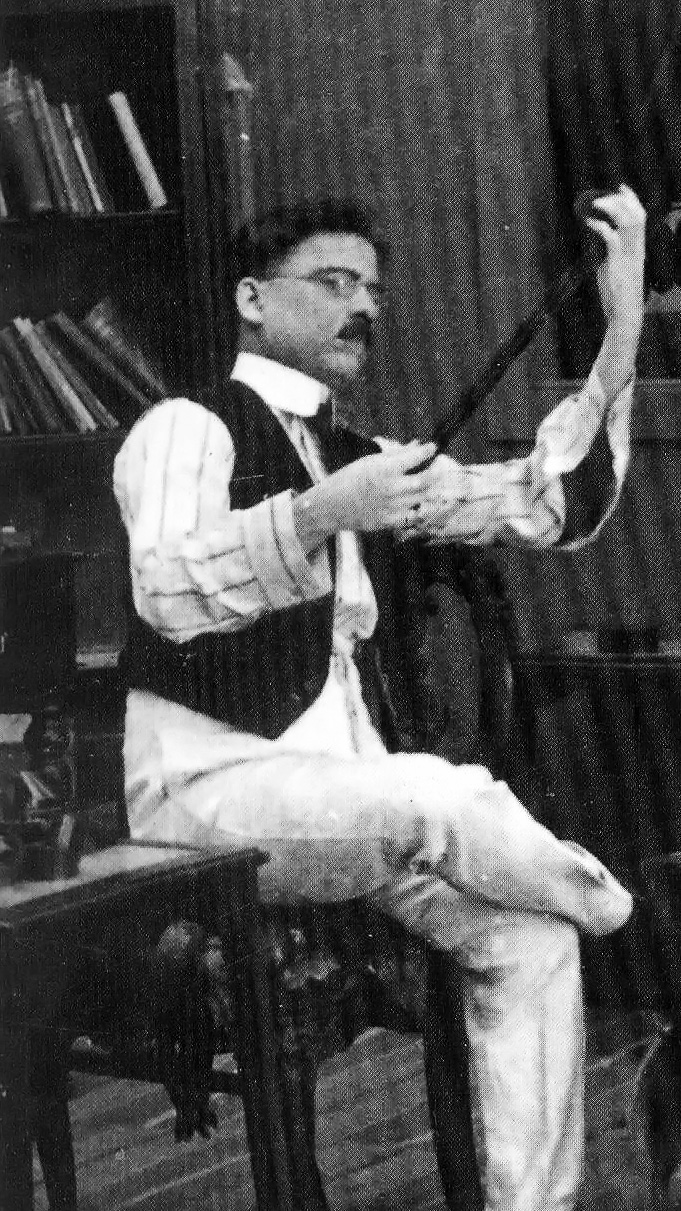
Phalke seated on a chair with a small roll of film in his hands

Phalke hired around forty people for his film studio known as a factory in those days. Since working in films was a taboo, Phalke advised his artists to tell others they were working in a factory for a man named Harishchandra. Phalke watched several foreign films to learn about screenplay writing and then completed the script for Raja Harishchandra. The film had an all-male cast as no women were available to play female leads. After coming to the studio, male actors playing female roles were asked to wear saris and do women's chores like sifting rice, and making flour to help Saraswatibai. Though some actors were associated with theatres, most of the cast did not have any prior acting experience. Phalke ran several rehearsals with the actors. Often, he had to wear a sari himself and act out the scene. A number of photographs from English periodicals showing various facial expressions were hung up in the rehearsal studio. All the actors had to go through a mandatory exercise where they were asked to make similar faces.

About the same time, the Rajapurkar Natak Mandali drama company visited Bombay. Many of the company's shows were based on Hindu mythology. Phalke met the company's proprietor, Babajirao Rane, and explained his idea of indigenous film production. Rane was impressed by the idea and offered his support by lending his actors and their costumes. Phalke decided to use material like Harishchandra's crown, wig, swords, shields, and bows and arrows in the film. Phalke's brother-in-law owned two drama companies, Belgaokar Natak Mandali and Saraswati Natak Mandali. He offered similar help, but Phalke politely declined as the majority of the cast and crew were finalised. Phalke designed the costumes and stage scenes based on the paintings of Raja Ravi Varma and M. V. Dhurandhar. He painted the scenes for the palace, jungle, mountains, fields and caves himself on curtains. After the sets were erected for the indoor shooting, painter Rangnekar was hired for the monthly salary of ₹60.

Phalke imported the hardware required for the filmmaking and exhibition from England, France, Germany, and the United States from manufacturers including Houghton Butcher, Zeiss Tessar, and Pathé. This included negative and positive film stocks, cameras, lights, film laboratory equipment, printing and editing machines, negative cutting tools, and film projectors. He decided to take on the responsibility for the scriptment, direction, production design, make-up, Film editing, and film processing. He asked Trymbak B. Telang, his childhood friend from Nashik, to come to Bombay. Telang was working as a priest at the Trimbakeshwar Shiva Temple. Phalke had taught him still photography as a childhood hobby. After his arrival, Phalke trained Telang in the operation of the Williamson camera and made him the film's cinematographer.

=== Filming ===
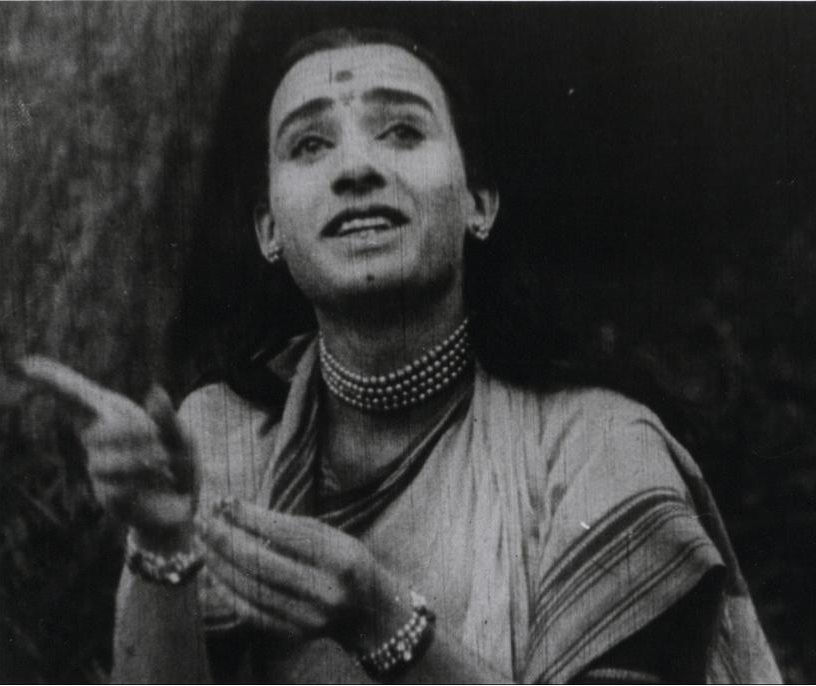
Anna Salunke as Sita in Lanka Dahan (1917)

Production design for the film started after the monsoon season of 1912. While the sets were being erected at Phalke's bungalow at Dadar, an outdoor shooting was scheduled at Vangani, a village outside Bombay. Some of the male actors playing female roles, including Anna Salunke who was playing the female lead, were not ready to shave off their moustaches because it is part of one of the Hindu rituals to be performed after the death of one's father. Phalke persuaded the actors and their fathers to have the moustaches shaved and the unit left for Vangani.

The unit was lodged at the village temple and continued their rehearsals until Phalke arrived from Bombay. The villagers were frightened to see the troupe of people wearing costumes, wielding swords, shields, and spears while practising the scenes. They informed the Patil (village headman) that dacoits (robbers) had entered the village. He immediately reported to the Faujdar (commander) who visited the temple. The unit explained film-making to them, but the Faujdar did not believe their story and arrested everyone. When Phalke reached the village, he immediately met the Patil and the Faujdar explaining to them again about cinema and filming by showing them the equipment. Without loading film into the camera, he asked his unit to enact one of the film's scenes and went through the motions of filming a scene. After viewing the scene, the Faujdar understood Phalke's new venture and released everyone.

While playing with other children, Bhalchandra fell on a rock and his head started bleeding. Phalke treated him with a first aid kit, but he remained unconscious. Various unit members suggested that Bhalchandra should be taken to Bombay for further treatment and once he was completely recovered, shooting could be resumed. The scene that was to be filmed showed Rohitashva, Bhalchandra's character, dead on a funeral pyre. Resuming the outdoor shoot after Bhalchandra's recovery would have delayed the production and incurred costs. To avoid both, Phalke stoically decided to shoot the scene with the unconscious Bhalchandra. As in the legends of Harishchandra, the King along with Taramati and Rohitashva visit Kashi. It was financially challenging for Phalke to go to Kashi and shoot scenes there. So, he took his unit to Trimbakeshwar, where they camped for about a month and filmed the required scenes. Phalke used to develop the film at night for the scenes that were shot throughout the day. He would re-shoot the scenes next day if they were not of the desired quality. Filming was completed in six months and twenty-seven days to produce a film of 3,700 feet (1,100 m); about four reels.

Phalke used trick photography to shoot one of the scenes where the god appears and disappears from behind the smoke of sage Vishvamitra's Yajna-kund. The film negative stocks used were of limited spectral sensitivity with low sensitivity to the red band of the spectrum; thus, sets, costumes, and artists' make-up artists avoided the colour red. During the early nineteenth century, plays had an introductory episode, a compere or a person who introduces the performers in a show. Unit members suggested the film should also have similar introductory episode with Phalke and his wife playing the roles of Sutradhar and Nati. Phalke agreed to the idea but could not convince Saraswatibai to act in front of a camera. Finally, Padurang Gadhadhar Sane played the role of Nati.

== Release ==
=== Film premiere ===
Phalke had difficulties arranging a theatre for screening as criticism of his work had already started. He decided to show the film to a select audience and arranged for a premiere at the Olympia Theatre, Bombay on 21 April 1913 at 9:00 pm. The invitees included doctor and public worker Sir Bhalchandra Bhatavdekar, scholar R. G. Bhandarkar, a judge of Small Cause Court Justice Donald, newspaper editors and representatives along with some intellectuals and prominent personalities from Bombay. As Phalke's infant daughter, Mandakini, was ill with pneumonia, his elder brother, Shivrampant, advised him to postpone the premiere to another day. But, as the invitations had already been sent and the theatre was available only on 21 April, Phalke could not change his decision.

Bhatavdekar introduced the premiere acknowledging Phalke for his "daring". Justice Donald noted that the film would help Europeans learn more about Hindu mythology. Anant Narayan Kowlgekar of Kesari in his review mentioned that "Phalke has grandly brought his skill to the notice of the world." The Times of India in their review noted the scenes depicted in the film are "simply marvellous" and "[I]t is really a pleasure to see this piece of Indian workmanship". With the favourable reviews generated, Nanasaheb Chitre, Manager of the Coronation Cinematograph and Variety Hall, Girgaon, expressed his desire to screen the film.

=== Theatrical release ===
The film had its theatrical release on 3 May 1913 at the Coronation Cinematograph and Variety Hall. The show included a dance by Irene Delmar, a comic act by McClements, foot-juggling by Alexandroff, and Tip-Top comic items followed by the film. The show's duration was one-and-half hours with four shows scheduled a day at 6:00 pm, 8:00 pm, 10:00 pm, and 11:45 pm. An advertisement for the film published in The Bombay Chronicle had a note added at the end that the ticket rates would be double the usual rates. The film had a houseful run for a week, and it was extended for twelve more days. A special show was scheduled on 17 May for women and children only at half rates. Initially, 18 May was advertised as the last show, but the film continued its screening due to popular demand. It screened continuously for twenty-three days until 25 May and was screened at the Alexandra Theatre on 28 June. The Bombay Chronicle in its issue of 5 May 1913 mentioned that "this wonderful drama is splendidly represented by the company of actors" and praised the "beauty and ingenuity" with which Phalke succeeded in presenting the film scenes.

News of the film's success in Bombay spread across India and there were demands to screen the film in various locations. As there were no film distributors in those days, Phalke had to move the film, the projector, an operator, and some assistants from place to place. When the film was screened for a week at the Nawabi Theatre in Surat, Phalke signed a temporary agreement for 50% partnership with the theatre owner. Despite advertising the film, at its first showing the film met with a lukewarm response. Disappointed by the earnings of only ₹3, the owner asked Phalke either to cancel the show, increase its length, or reduce ticket prices. Phalke politely rejected these suggestions. He issued an advertisement in the Gujarati language calling on people to see "57,000 photographs of three-quarters of an inch width and two miles length", for just one Indian anna. He also had his actors enact some of the film's scenes at the town's crossroads. The promotion had the desired effect and earnings increased to ₹300. Later, the film was also screened at Pune, Colombo, London, and Rangoon with Marathi and Hindi-language intertitles.

== Legacy ==
Film historian Firoze Rangoonwalla feels that the film made "a wide impression and appealed to a large audience in different places" and its box office success provided "the seal of acceptance and laid the foundation of the film industry" in the country. Director and cinematographer Govind Nihalani explains that the film was shot partly outdoors in direct sunlight and partly in outdoor studios with sunlight blocked by white muslin producing soft and diffused light. He appreciates the tonal gradation, lighting, and camera movements. He also notes the scene where the god appears and disappears from behind the smoke of sage Vishvamitra's Yajna-kund gives an impression that the scene was filmed in a single shot. Film critic Satish Bahadur points out that though the title cards in the film were in English and Hindi, "there was something unmistakably Maharashtrian" in the film. He also mentions that the interior architecture and dresses of countries in the film are more of a Deccan Peshwai style than North Indian. Ashish Rajadhyaksha in his The Phalke Era: Conflict of Traditional Form and Modern Technology (1993) mentions that the film's narrative style was borrowed from painting, theatre and traditional arts to attract the audience into cinema. Dilip Rajput of the National Film Archive of India notes that the film's scenes appear to run faster because of the current projector speed of 24-frames-per-second as compared to 16 to 18-frames-per-second speed of the projector that was used for the film.

Directed by Paresh Mokashi, the 2009 Marathi film Harishchandrachi Factory (Harishchandra's Factory) depicts the making of Raja Harishchandra. The film won the National Film Award for Best Feature Film in Marathi at the 56th National Film Awards. It was selected as India's official entry to the 82nd Academy Awards in the Best Foreign Language Film category along with the 62nd British Academy Film Awards and the 66th Golden Globe Awards but was not listed among the final five nominations.

=== Extant prints ===
The original length of a film was 3,700 feet (1,100 m), about four reels. In 1917, the film's last print caught fire due to the constant friction and the exposure to high temperatures while it was being transported from one theatre to another, by a bullock cart. Phalke readily re-shot the film to produce the version that exists today. However, only the first and last reels of the original film are preserved at the National Film Archive of India (NFAI) making it a partially lost film. Some film historians believe they actually belong to a 1917 remake of the film, titled Satyavadi Raja Harishchandra. NFAI duplicated the film, but around twenty percent of the left side of the screen was lost in the transfer. It was believed the film's remaining reels were destroyed along with 1,700 nitrate-based films in the fire at the Film and Television Institute of India on 8 January 2003. The prints were later retrieved from the private collection of Phalke's children. The NFAI has restored and digitised the film.

=== Classification as first full-length Indian film ===
The status of Raja Harischandra as the first full-length Indian feature film has been debated. Some film historians consider Dadasaheb Torne's silent film Shree Pundalik as the maiden Indian film. Torne's film was released at the same theatre as Raja Harischandra on 18 May 1912, almost a year before. An argument has been made in favour of Raja Harischandra that Shree Pundalik is a cinematographic recording of a play, using a single, fixed camera and it was filmed by a British cameraman with the film stock processed in London. The Government of India recognises Raja Harischandra as the first Indian feature film. In 1969, it introduced the Dadasaheb Phalke Award, the country's highest award in cinema, to commemorate Phalke's contribution to Indian cinema.

== See also ==
- Alam Ara – The first Indian sound film
- List of incomplete or partially lost films

== Bibliography ==
- Bose, Mihir (2006). Bollywood: A History. Tempus. ISBN 978-0-7524-2835-2. Archived from the original on 3 January 2014.
- Gulzar; Nihalani, Govind; Chatterjee, Saibal, eds. (2003). Encyclopaedia of Hindi Cinema. Popular Prakashan. ISBN 978-81-7991-066-5. Archived from the original on 5 April 2019.
- Kosambi, Meera (2017) [2014]. Gender, Culture, and Performance: Marathi Theatre and Cinema before Independence. Taylor & Francis. ISBN 978-1-351-56590-5. Archived from the original on 8 September 2020.
- Raheja, Dinesh; Kothari, Jitendra (2004). Indian Cinema: The Bollywood Saga. Aurum Press. ISBN 978-1-84513-016-9.
- Rajadhyaksha, Ashish; Willemen, Paul, eds. (1998) [1994]. Encyclopaedia of Indian Cinema (PDF). Oxford University Press. ISBN 978-0-19-563579-9. Archived from the original (PDF) on 21 August 2016.
- Watve, Bapu (2012) [2004]. Dadasaheb Phalke, The Father of Indian Cinema. Translated by Virkar, S. A. National Book Trust. ISBN 978-81-237-4319-6.
