= Lanka Dahan =

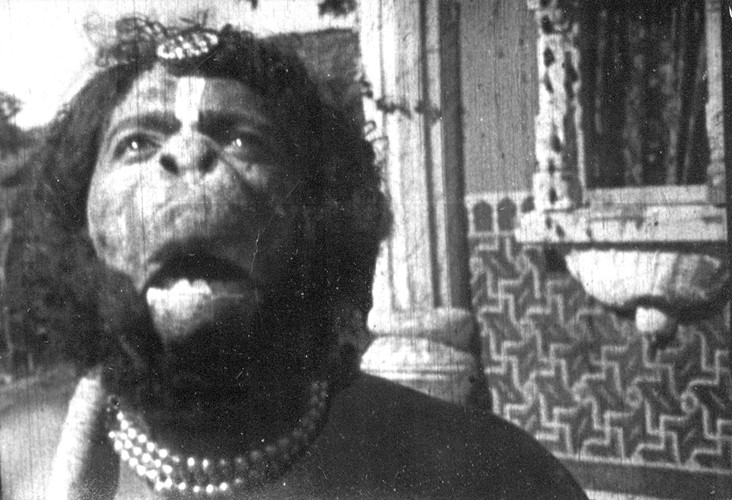
- A still from the film, depicting an enraged Hanuman, played by Ganpat G. Shinde
- Directed by: Dhundiraj Govind Phalke
- Written by: Dhundiraj Govind Phalke
- Based on: Ramayana by Valmiki
- Produced by: Dhundiraj Govind Phalke
- Starring: Anna Salunke; Ganpat G. Shinde
- Cinematography: Trymbak B. Telang
- Release date: 1917
- Country: India
- Languages: Silent Film; Marathi intertitles

Lanka Dahan (1917) by Dadasaheb Phalke

Lanka Dahan (English: Lanka Aflame) is a 1917 Indian silent film directed by Dadasaheb Phalke. Phalke also wrote the film based on an episode of the Hindu epic Ramayana, credited to Valmiki. The film was Phalke's second feature film after the 1913 Raja Harishchandra, which was the first Indian full-length feature film. Phalke also directed various short films in between.

Anna Salunke, who had previously played the role of Rani Taramati in Phalke's Raja Harishchandra played two roles in this film. As women were prohibited from taking part in commercial performing arts, men also played the female characters. Salunke played the male character of Rama as well as the female character of his wife Sita. He is thus credited with playing the first double role in Indian cinema.

== Plot ==
Rama, the prince of Ayodhya, is exiled to the forests for a term of fourteen years. He is joined by his wife Sita and brother Laxman. Ravana, the demon king, who also wanted to wed Sita, decides to take revenge and abducts her from the forest. While on the search for his wife, Rama meets Hanuman. Hanuman is a great devotee of Rama and promises to find Sita.

Hanuman flies to the island of Lanka and finds Sita there. He informs her that he is a great devotee of Rama and that Rama would soon be coming to take her back. To prove his identity, he gives her Rama's ring. On his return journey he is arrested by the soldiers of Ravana. When produced in court Ravana orders Hanuman's tail to be set on fire. Hanuman then breaks his bondage and flies away. With his tail on fire he sets the whole city of Lanka ablaze. After setting fire to the whole town, Hanuman leaps away from the island and extinguishes the fire in the Indian Ocean.

== Cast ==
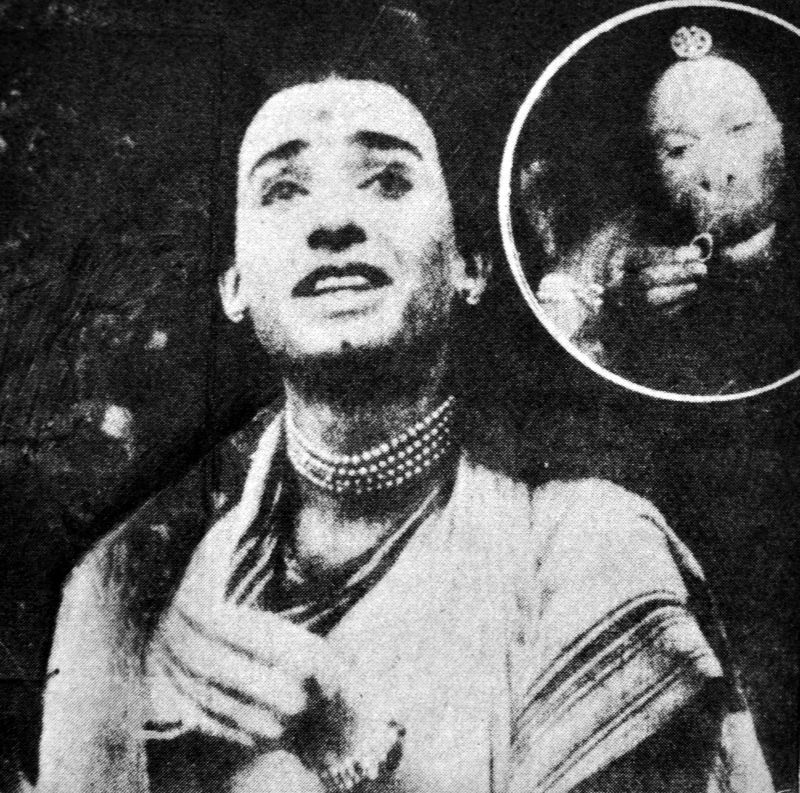
Salunkhe in the role of Sita. Inset shows Hanuman giving the ring

- Anna Salunke as Rama and Sita
- Ganpat G. Shinde as Hanuman
- D.D. Dabke
- Mandakini Phalke

== Reception ==
As the film was based on a Hindu historical theme, it was well received by the audiences. When the film was screened in Mumbai (then Bombay), viewers used to take their shoes off when Rama, the Hindu god, appeared on screen. Trick photography and special effects used in the film delighted the audiences.

The film was well received by the masses. According to film historian Amrit Gangar, coins from ticket counters were collected in gunny bags and transported on bullock carts to the producer’s office. There were long queues at Majestic cinema in Bombay where people would fight for tickets and toss coins at the ticket counter because the film was mostly houseful.
