= Shaivya (wife of Harishchandra) =

Queen in Hindu mythology

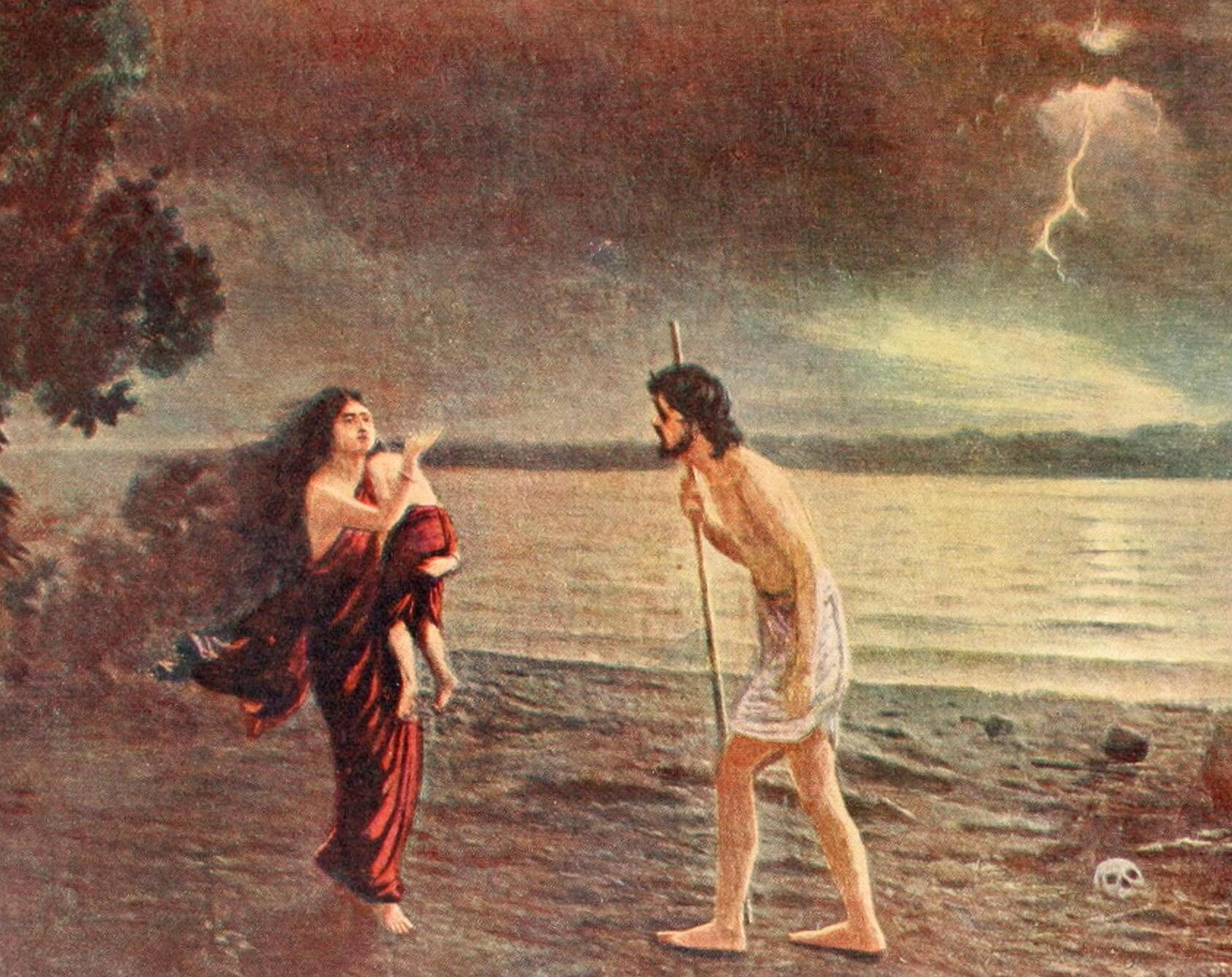
- Shaivya bringing her son's corpse to the cremation ground; early 20th-century illustration
- Texts: Markandeya Purana, Devi Bhagavata Purana
- Aliases: Shaibya, Taramati, Madhavi, Chandramati
- Title(s): Queen of Ayodhya, Kosala Kingdom
- Spouse: Harishchandra
- Children: Rohitashva
- Origin: Shivi

Shaivya (Sanskrit: शैव्या, romanized: Śaivyā, also spelt Shaibya), also known as Taramati (Sanskrit: तारामती, romanized: Tārāmatī), is a queen in Hindu mythology, best known as the wife of King Harishchandra of Ayodhya and mother of his sole heir, Rohitashva. Her story particularly appears in the Sanskrit texts Markandeya Purana and Devi Bhagvata Purana, where she is portrayed as a loyal and long-suffering queen who endures severe hardships alongside her husband during his divinely orchestrated trials by the wrathful sage, Vishvamitra.

According to the legend, when her husband, King Harishchandra, incurs the wrath of the sage Vishvamitra and is compelled to relinquish his kingdom and wealth, Shaivya remains by his side as they descend into poverty. When Vishvamitra demands further offerings, it is Shaivya who proposes selling herself to a wealthy Brahmin so that her husband can fulfill the sage’s demands. She endures severe hardship, including verbal abuse and physical mistreatment during her servitude. Her trials reach a climax when her son dies from a snake bite. In a state of grief and dishevelment, Shaivya unknowingly approaches her husband—now employed as a crematorium attendant—to seek permission for the funeral rites. Bound by his duties, he refuses to proceed without the required payment. They bewail their misfortunes and decide to immolate themselves on their son’s funeral pile. Ultimately, the gods and Vishvamitra—who have been testing the couple’s virtue—are moved by their unwavering moral integrity, and Shaivya and her family are restored to honor and granted entry into heaven.

In Marathi devotional literature, particularly the Vārkarī interpretations of Harishchandra narratives, Shaivya is known as Taramati, a name that gained enduring popularity in western India and later in modern period. These narratives elevated her role, emphasizing her spiritual strength, endurance, and unwavering virtue, often paralleling her trials with devotional ideals of sattva (goodness) and bhakti (devotion). Shaivya remains a popular tragic heroine in Indian cultural memory and features prominently in numerous adaptations of the Harishchandra legend, including Raja Harishchandra (1913), India’s first full-length feature film.

== Names ==
The Sanskrit term Śaivyā (often also written Śaibyā) is derived from the term Śaivya—an ethnonymic adjective stemming from Śivi, the name of an ancient and celebrated royal figure or tribe. The suffix -ya or -īya in Sanskrit commonly denotes "descended from" or "related to," thereby rendering Śaivya as meaning “of the Śivis” or “descendant of Śivi.” The name is not exclusive to the wife of King Harishchandra in Sanskrit literature and has also been used for several other princesses from the Śivi lineage.

The Devi-Bhagavata Purana introduces another name for the figure, in addition to Śaivya, namely Mādhavī. In Marathi literature, she is referred to as Tārāmatī instead, which has become widely associated with the character due to its repeated appearance in vernacular literature and modern media adaptations of the narrative. In Southern India, Shaivya is known as Chandramati.

== Puranic accounts ==
=== Markandeya Purana ===
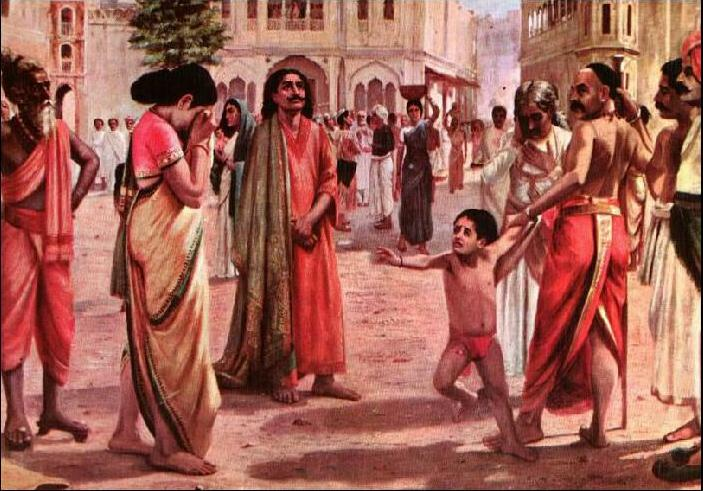
Shaivya weeps at the auction, as the cruel Brahmin attempts to separate her son, painting by Raja Ravi Varma

Although Harishchandra appears in several earlier texts, Shaivya first gains narrative prominence in the Markandeya Purana (c. 250 CE), where she is portrayed as an peripheral figure in the earliest extant version of the legend. In this account, the sage Vishvamitra devises a series of trials to test Harishchandra’s adherence to truth and righteousness. The trials of Shaivya and her family begin when Harishchandra inadvertently disturbs Vishvamitra during his penance. Angered by the interruption, the sage demands a series of increasingly severe sacrifices. He first extracts from the king a promise to relinquish his entire kingdom and later insists that Harishchandra surrender all his possessions, sparing only himself, his wife, and his child. Unable to meet further escalating demands, the family travels to Varanasi in search of a livelihood. As they depart, the devastated citizens of Ayodhya lament Shaivya’s plight—once a noble queen, now condemned to suffering and hardship. Vishvamitra, unmoved by their sorrow, further humiliates Shaivya by beating her during the journey to hasten her pace. This act angers the Vishvadevas, a group of five deities, who protest the injustice, but Vishvamitra curses them for interfering in his trial.

Reduced to destitution, Harishchandra pledges to pay an additional sacrificial fee within a month. During this period of hardship in Varanasi, Shaivya remains unwavering in her support of Harishchandra. Witnessing his despair, she encourages him to remain devoted to truth, which she regards as the highest form of righteousness. In a profound act of loyalty and self-sacrifice, Shaivya volunteers to be sold to enable her husband to fulfil his vow. Harishchandra, devastated by the suggestion, breaks down, and Shaivya comforts him with dignity and resolve. Soon after, Vishvamitra arrives to demand immediate payment. Left with no alternative, the family proceeds to the market in Varanasi, where Harishchandra auctions Shaivya. She is purchased by a cruel and elderly Brahmin as a housemaid and is dragged away by her hair. Seeing her devasted son following her, Shaivya pleads with the buyer to purchase her son, Rohitashva, as well, so they are not separated. The Brahmin reluctantly agrees. Despite the cruelty and humiliation she endures, Shaivya maintains her composure, offering comfort to her weeping son even as she suffers herself.

Tragedy strikes when Rohitashva dies from a snake bite. Shaivya brings his body to the cremation ground and attempts to perform the funeral rites herself. There, she unexpectedly reunites with her husband, Harishchandra, who by this time has been reduced to the role of an attendant at the cremation grounds. Due to the extreme hardships they have both endured, the couple initially fails to recognise one another. Recognition dawns only after they prepare their son’s funeral pyre. Harishchandra, moved by Shaivya’s lamentations, realises her identity, and the couple is overcome with sorrow and consolation. At this moment of profound human suffering and despair, the couple decide to end their sufferings by immolating themselves along with their son's body. Divine forces, along with Vishvamitra, intervene. Their son is miraculously restored to life, and the gods reveal that the entire episode had been a moral test of their unwavering commitment to truth and righteousness. The royal family is restored to honour, and their virtue is rewarded with divine recognition and heavenly ascent.

=== Devi Bhagavata Purana ===
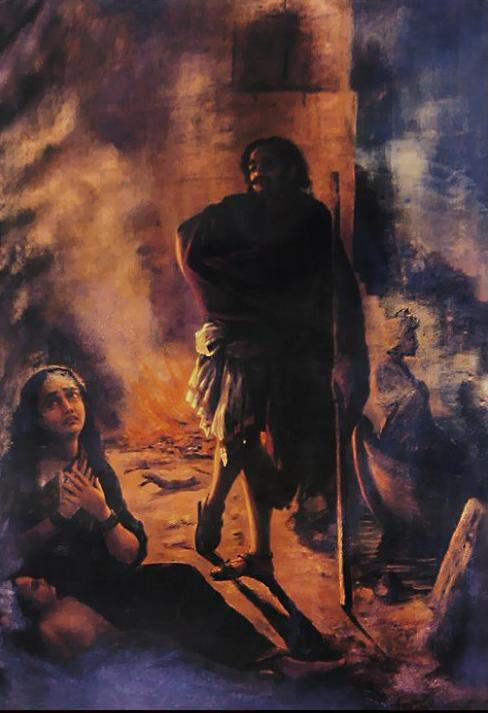
Taramati (Shaivya) laments the death of her son at the cremation ground, while Harishchandra helplessly watches, painting by Raja Ravi Varma

In the Devi Bhagavata Purana, a later medieval female-centric Sanskrit text, the figure of Shaivya is developed in greater depth. She is introduced as the daughter of the king of the Shivi Kingdom, situated in the western region of the Indian subcontinent. Among Harishchandra’s numerous consorts—numbering a hundred—Shaivya is portrayed as the chief queen and his principal partner in both devotion and suffering. The royal couple, though childless, are counseled by their family priest, the sage Vasishtha, to seek divine intervention. Harishchandra prays to the god Varuna, who agrees to grant them a son on the condition that the child will be offered in sacrifice. In due course, Shaivya gives birth to a son, Rohitashva. When the time arrives to fulfill the vow, Harishchandra—unable to sacrifice his own son—purchases a poor Brahmin boy and substitutes him for the offering. This act provokes the wrath of Vishvamitra, who deems the substitution dishonest and unworthy of true righteousness. Determined to test Harishchandra’s virtue further, Vishvamitra engineers an extended ordeal for the royal family. The narrative expands significantly beyond earlier accounts, portraying more intense suffering for Shaivya, with an attempt to justify her inhumane treatment for her family's attempt to sacrifice an innocent boy.

In this version, the Brahmin who purchases Shaivya in the slave market is eventually revealed to be Vishvamitra in disguise. Under his control, Shaivya is subjected to repeated physical and verbal abuse. The tale describes in graphic detail the emotional and physical toll this takes on her, particularly after the death of her son. Rohitashva, while playing along the banks of the Ganges, is bitten by a snake and dies. Upon hearing the news from other children, Shaivya collapses in grief and, after regaining consciousness, pleads with her master for permission to cremate her child. Her request is denied until she finishes her household chores, and she is threatened with a whip should she persist. Despite her desperate tears and pleas, the Brahmin strikes her and orders her back to work. Only at midnight, she is allowed to leave. Overwhelmed, Shaivya flees to the riverside where her son's body lies. She finds him stiff and blue from poison, and cries out in anguish. Locals gather but, failing to comprehend her identity, mistake her for a ghost or madwoman. Some attempt to harm her; others seize her by the hair and strike her repeatedly. Eventually, she is bound and dragged to the cremation grounds.

There, they demand that Harishchandra—now employed as an attendant of the cremation grounds—kill her for her perceived transgression. He refuses to harm a woman, prompting the local outcaste king to intervene and hand him a sword, insisting he carry out the command. As Harishchandra hesitates to raise the sword, Shaivya pleads to be allowed to cremate her son first. Moved by her grief, Harishchandra consents. Shaivya brings Rohitashva’s body to the cremation ground, and as the rites begin, mutual recognition slowly dawns. Nevertheless, Harishchandra insists that a funeral without the customary fee would violate his duties. With no means to pay, the couple decide to end their lives alongside their son. The ending is similar to the Markandeya Purana version.

== In vernacular traditions ==
From the second millennium onwards, the Harishchandra legend attained immense popularity across regional literary cultures. In the early 13th century, the Kannada poet Raghavanka composed Harishchandra Kavya, a vernacular ākhyāna-kāvya that marked a significant milestone in South Asian literary history. In the poem, Shaivya is named Chandramati and here, she is accused of her son's murder before being brought to the cemetery for execution, like in the Devi Bhagavata Purana version.

Between the 14th and 18th centuries, at least ten major retellings appeared in Marathi alone, with additional adaptations found in Bengali, Braj, Tamil, and Telugu.

=== Varkari narratives ===
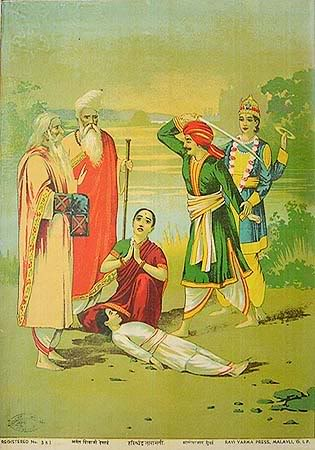
19th century print depicting Taramati being saved by the god Vishnu

Most notably, Shaivya gains significant emotional and narrative presence in medieval Marathi literature, particularly within the Vishnu-centric Varkari devotional tradition of Maharashtra, where she known as Taramati instead. This shift is most prominently seen in the Marathi compositions of Namdev (1270–1350) and his disciple Janabai (d. 1350), both of whom were non-Brahmin saint-poets. Their retellings frame the Harishchandra legend as a moral and devotional exemplar, emphasizing the virtues of sattva (goodness) and bhakti (devotion) of characters, including Taramati, rather than social justice or Brahminical authority.

In Varkari versions, Taramati emerges as a co-sufferer alongside Harishchandra, enduring physical and psychological hardships that far exceed the scriptural accounts. Vishvamitra is depicted not as a divine sage but as a cruel antagonist, described with almost exaggerated villainy. He magically invades Harishchandra’s dreams to demand his kingdom and later, appearing in person, insists on further payment. When the king hesitates, Vishvamitra beats both him and Taramati with a stick. He then separates the family, unleashes supernatural disasters to torment them. The central journey to Varanasi becomes a prolonged trial in the Marathi versions, featuring episodes absent in Sanskrit tellings. Vishvamitra manipulates the elements against the royal family, creates hallucinations, and uses deception to test their resolve. On the road, he separates Taramati from her husband and son, shows her false corpses, and tempts them with illusory comforts, only for them to refuse. After Rohit dies, he falsely guides Taramati into a temple and while she sleeps, he smears her face with the blood and entrails of her deceased son and then accuses Taramati of being a witch, so that the townsfolk persecute her.

Throughout these ordeals, Taramati exemplifies steadfast devotion to both her husband and her dharma. She remains loyal and composed in the face of loss and humiliation, and even when wrongfully accused of witchcraft, she accepts her fate without wavering. The climactic moment in both Namdev’s and Janabai’s versions occurs when Harishchandra is ordered to execute her. In Namdev's version, Taramati prays to Vishnu just before the fatal blow, asking for rebirth with her husband and son and, strikingly, for Vishvamitra as her “adoring petitioner.” This prayer prompts Vishnu to miraculously intervene and halt the execution. In Janabai's retelling, however, the final transformation occurs within Vishvamitra himself. Moved by Harishchandra’s unwavering virtue, the sage stops the execution and offers Taramati the chance to make a wish. She repeats the same prayer as in Namdev’s version, omitting only the reference to the family’s guru, Vasishtha. The narrative concludes with Vishvamitra bestowing all his tapas (ascetic merit) on the king and restoring him to his throne, marking a sharp departure from the Puranic ending where the family ascends to heaven.

=== Other ===
Taramati is featured in popular oral traditions transmitted by funeral priests at the cremation ghats of Varanasi, Uttar Pradesh, especially in connection Harishchandra ghat, traditionally believed to be the same cremation ground where Harishchandra worked. Taramati's struggle to perform relentless domestic labor is emphasized, and like in other popular narrative, she is accused of witchcraft, but here, she begs for medical aid when her son is bitten. Her pleas for medical aid are met not with sympathy but with violence, as the wife of the Brahmin responds to her desperation by physically assaulting her, demanding compensation for the loss of their "investment" in the boy. The cremation ground scene is significantly different from other accounts as Harishchandra in this version refuses to recognize his wife and son, even after lightning reveals their identities. His insistence on the funeral tax (kar), regardless of personal connection, underscores the oral tradition’s emphasis on karmic obligation and the transactional nature of death rituals. In this telling, Taramati offers her wedding ring as payment and even prepares to strip her sari to fulfill the last of the Dom’s perquisites, which is eventually prevented by intervention of the gods and sages.

== In popular culture ==
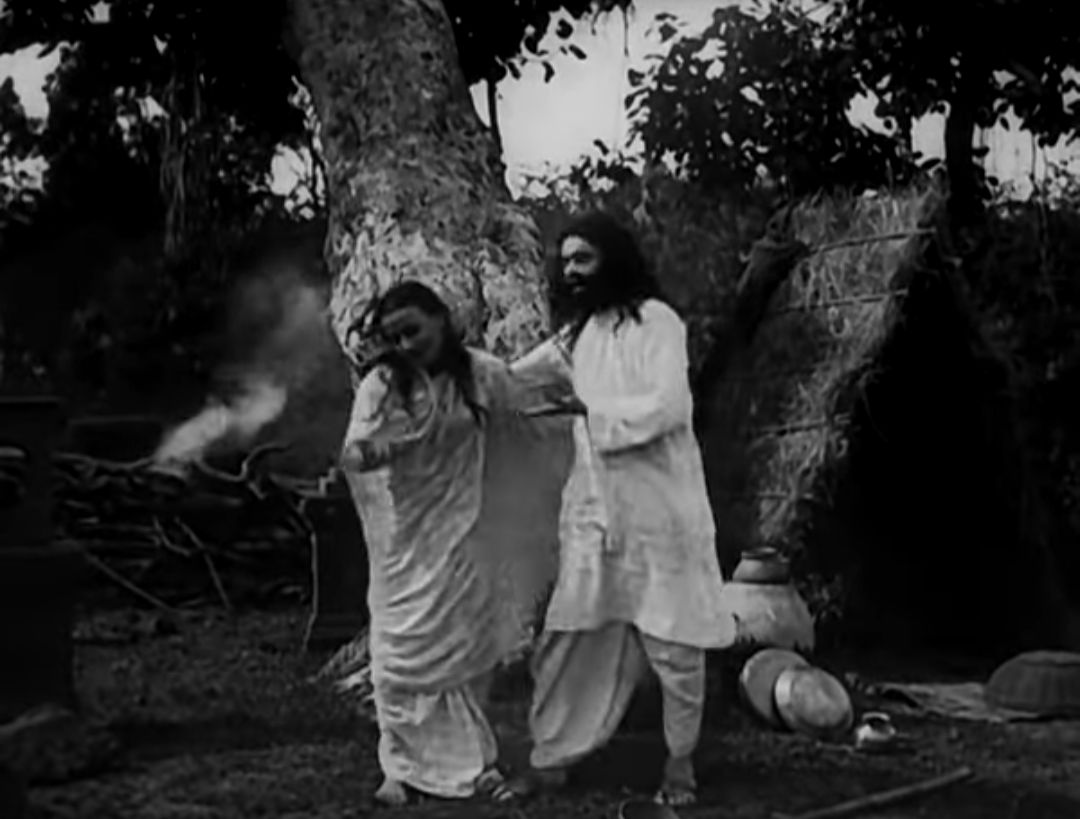
A scene from Raja Harishchandra (1913) depicting Anna Salunke as Taramati (Shaivya) and Dattatraya Damodar Dabke as Harishchandra

Shaivya or Taramati occupies a foundational place in the history of Indian cinema as the first heroine to appear in a feature film. Her role was central to the 1913 silent film Raja Harishchandra by Dadasaheb Phalke, which is widely regarded as the first full-length Indian motion picture. Casting Taramati proved difficult due to prevailing social norms that discouraged women from acting. Although male actors commonly played female roles in theatre, Phalke insisted the role be played by a woman. He conducted an extensive but unsuccessful search for a heroine, even approaching to courtesans and women in red-light districts, believing they might be more amenable to appearing on screen. Eventually, with no willing female candidates available, Phalke cast a young man named Anna Salunke, owing to his slender build and delicate features, in the role of Taramati. Taramati's appearance in the film was based upon the artworks of painters Raja Ravi Varma and M. V. Dhurandhar and had strong Marathi influence, with costly silks used for her nine-yard styled saree.
