= Rohitashva =

Son of Harishchandra in Hinduism

- Texts: Puranas

Genealogy
- Parents: Harishchandra (father); Shaivya (mother)
- Dynasty: Suryavamsha

Rohitashva (Sanskrit: रोहिताश्व, romanized: Rohitāśva) or Lohitashva is a prince in Hinduism, known for his extraordinary journey and acts of devotion. He is the son of Harishchandra, a revered king celebrated for his truthfulness and piety towards the gods.

== Etymology ==
The name Rohitashva originates from Sanskrit and consists of two words: rohita, signifying "red" or "ruddy," and ashva, meaning "horse."

== Legend ==
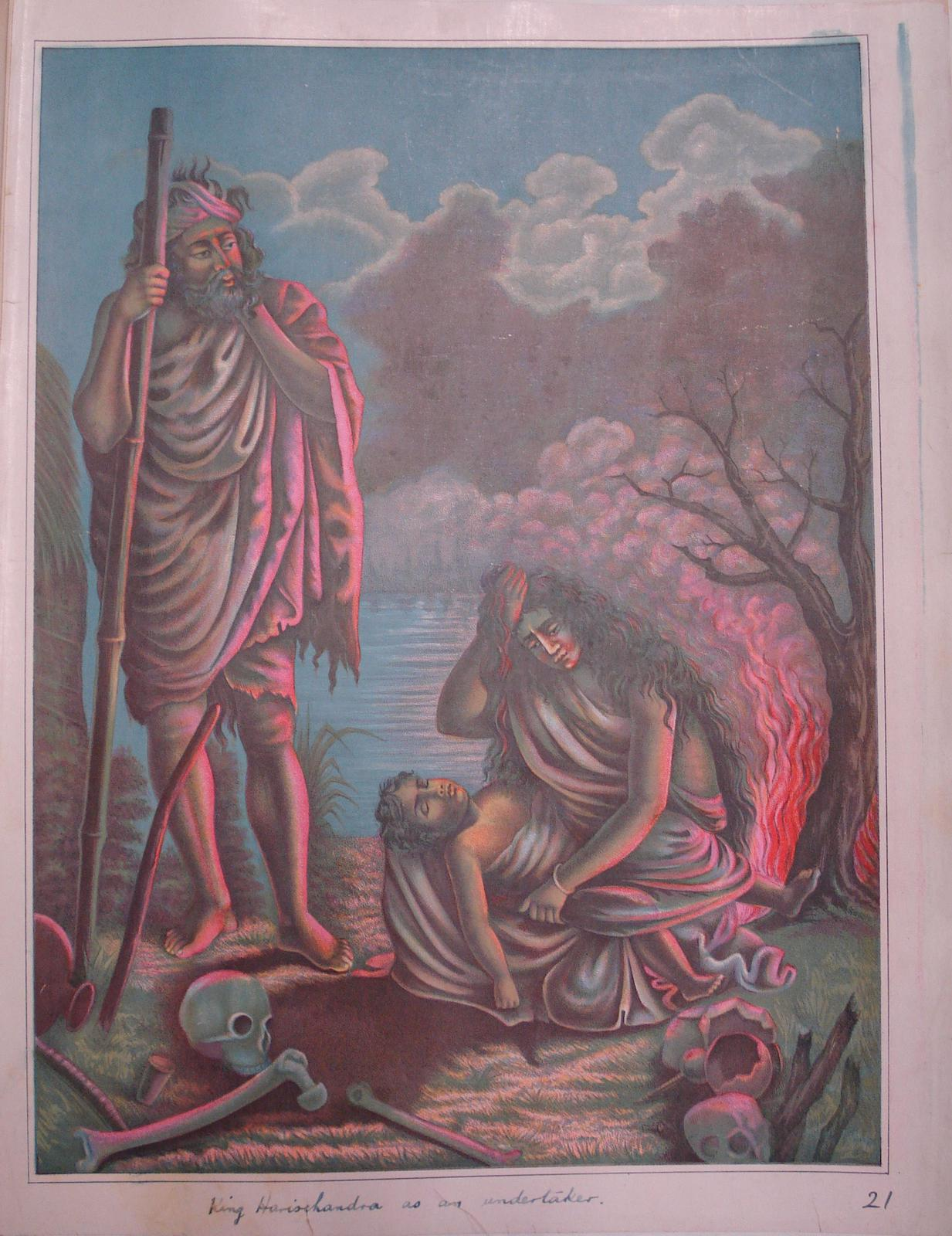
1870s lithograph from Calcutta, depicting Shaivya mourning over Rohitashva's corpse while Harishchandra looks on.

Rohitashva's legend is featured in the Markandeya Purana:

Rohitashva was the son of King Harishchandra and his queen Shaivya. Once, while on a hunting expedition, Harishchandra was possessed by Vighnaraja, the lord of obstacles, in order to disturb the tapasya (meditation) of the sage Vishvamitra. When Harishchandra came to his senses, he realised that the sage was extremely angry with him, and apologised. He promised to fulfill any of the sage's desires to get rid of his guilt. Vishvamitra demanded that the king give up all that he possessed, except his wife and Rohitashva, to him. Harishchandra assented and left his kingdom, promising to make one more payment to the sage in a month.

Harishchandra started living in penury with his wife and son. Nearly a month after leaving his kingdom, Harishchandra arrived in the city of Kashi, only to see Vishvamitra already present there. The sage demanded the donation that the king had promised him. Harishchandra pointed out that there was still some time left in completion of one month. The sage agreed to come back at the next sunset and departed. As Rohitashva cried for food, Harishchandra worried that he would be able to make a donation to the sage. His wife, Shaivya, suggested that he sell her to get some money. After some hesitation, Harishchandra accepted the proposal and sold her to an elderly man. Rohitashva would not let go of his mother, so it was decided that he would accompany her.

Soon after, Vishvamitra appeared again and demanded the donation. Harishchandra gave him all the money he had received from the sale of his wife and son. However, Vishvamitra was unhappy with the donation, and demanded more. Harishchandra then decided to sell himself. An outcaste chandala (actually Yama in disguise) offered to buy him, but Harishchandra's self-respect as a high-caste Kshatriya would not allow this. He instead offered to be Vishvamitra's slave. Vishvamitra agreed, but then declared "Since you are my slave, you must obey me. I sell you to this chandala in exchange of gold coins." The chandala paid the sage, and took along Harishchandra as a slave.

The chandala employed Harishchandra as a worker at his cremation ground. He directed Harishchandra to collect fees for every body cremated there: a part of the fee would go to the chandala, a part would be given to the local king, and the rest would be Harishchandra's remuneration. Harishchandra started living and working at the cremation ground. One day, he dreamed about his past lives, and realised that his current condition was a result of his past sins. During this nightmare, he also saw his queen crying before him. When he woke up, he saw his queen actually crying before him. She held the dead body of their son, who had died of a snake bite. Thinking of his misfortune, Harishchandra contemplated suicide, but realized that he would continue to pay for his sins in his next life.

Meanwhile, the queen readied to cremate their son's cadaver. But, Harishchandra told her that he would not let her do so without paying the fee. Meanwhile, all the deities appeared led by Yama and accompanied by Vishvamitra. They praised Harishchandra for his good qualities, and invited him to heaven.

But Harishchandra refused to go to heaven without his public who have lamented over his departure from his kingdom. He believed that they ere the equal sharer in his merits and that he would only go heaven when his people also accompany him. He requested the king of the devas, Indra, to allow his people to go to heaven at least for a single day. Indra accepts his request, and he along with his people ascend to the heaven.

After his ascension to heaven, Vashistha – the sage of Harishchandra's royal dynasty – ended his tapasya of twelve years. He learned of what had happened to Harishchandra during these years. He quarreled with Vishvamitra, but was ultimately pacified by Brahma. Brahma explained to him that Vishvamitra was only testing the king, and had actually helped him ascend to heaven.

== Sources ==
The Ananda-Vana of Indian mythology Art: Dr. Anand Krishna Felicitation Volume. Indica Books. 2004. Pages 345 and 346. Google Books
