= D. D. Dabke =

Indian actor

Dattatraya Damodar Dabke
- Born: 1885; Bidwal, Badnawar, Dhar, Madhya Pradesh
- Died: 15 September 1946 (aged 60–61)
- Occupations: Actor; Cinematographer; Film director

D. D. Dabke or Dattatraya Damodar Dabke was an actor in the first ever Indian full length silent film Raja Harishchandra, directed by Dadasaheb Phalke in 1913. He co-starred with Anna Salunke. He acted in three more movies Satyavadi Raja Harishchandra (1917), Lanka Dahan (1917), Shri Krishna Janma (1918) and later became a cinematographer, as well as a director. He directed the 1924 remake of Raja Harishchandra
