= Harishchandra =

King in Hindu literature

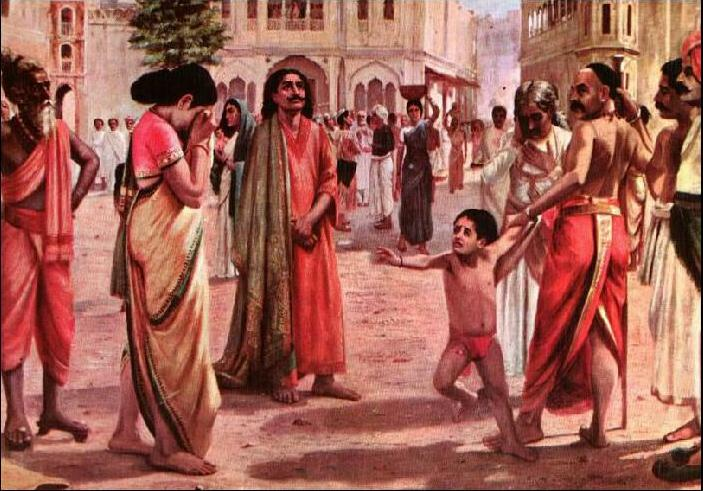
- Harishchandra and his family are separated and sold into bondage
- Texts: Markandeya Purana

Genealogy
- Parents: Trishanku (father)
- Spouse: Shaivya (chief queen); 99 junior wives
- Children: Rohitashva
- Dynasty: Suryavamsha

Harishchandra (Sanskrit: हरिश्चन्द्र, romanized: Hariścandra) is a legendary king of the Solar dynasty, who appears in several legends in texts such as the Aitareya Brahmana, Mahabharata, the Markandeya Purana, and the Devi Bhagavata Purana. The most famous of these stories is the one mentioned in the Markandeya Purana. According to this legend, Harishchandra gave away his kingdom, sold his family, and agreed to be a slave – all to fulfill a promise he had made to the sage Vishvamitra.

== Legend ==
=== Aitareya Brahmana ===
According to a legend mentioned in Aitareya Brahamana, Harishchandra had one hundred wives, but no son. On advice of the sage Narada, he prayed to the deity Varuna for a son. Varuna granted the boon, in exchange for an assurance that Harishchandra would make a sacrifice to Varuna in the future. As a result of this boon, a son named Rohita (or Rohitashva) was born to the king. After his birth, Varuna came to Harishchandra and demanded that the child be sacrificed to him. The king postponed the sacrifice multiple times citing various reasons, but finally agreed to it when Rohita became an adult. Rohita refused to be sacrificed and escaped to the forest. An angry Varuna afflicted Harishchandra with a stomach illness. Rohita intermittently visited his father, but on the advice of Indra, never agreed to the sacrifice. Later, Rohita managed to substitute himself with Sunahshepa in the human sacrifice. Sunahshepa prayed to the Rigvedic deities, and was saved from the sacrifice. Harishchandra's illness was also cured because of Sunahshepa's prayers; Sunahshepa was adopted by the sage Vishvamitra.

A similar story is narrated in the Ramayana, but the king's name is Ambarisha instead of Harishchandra.

=== Puranic legend ===
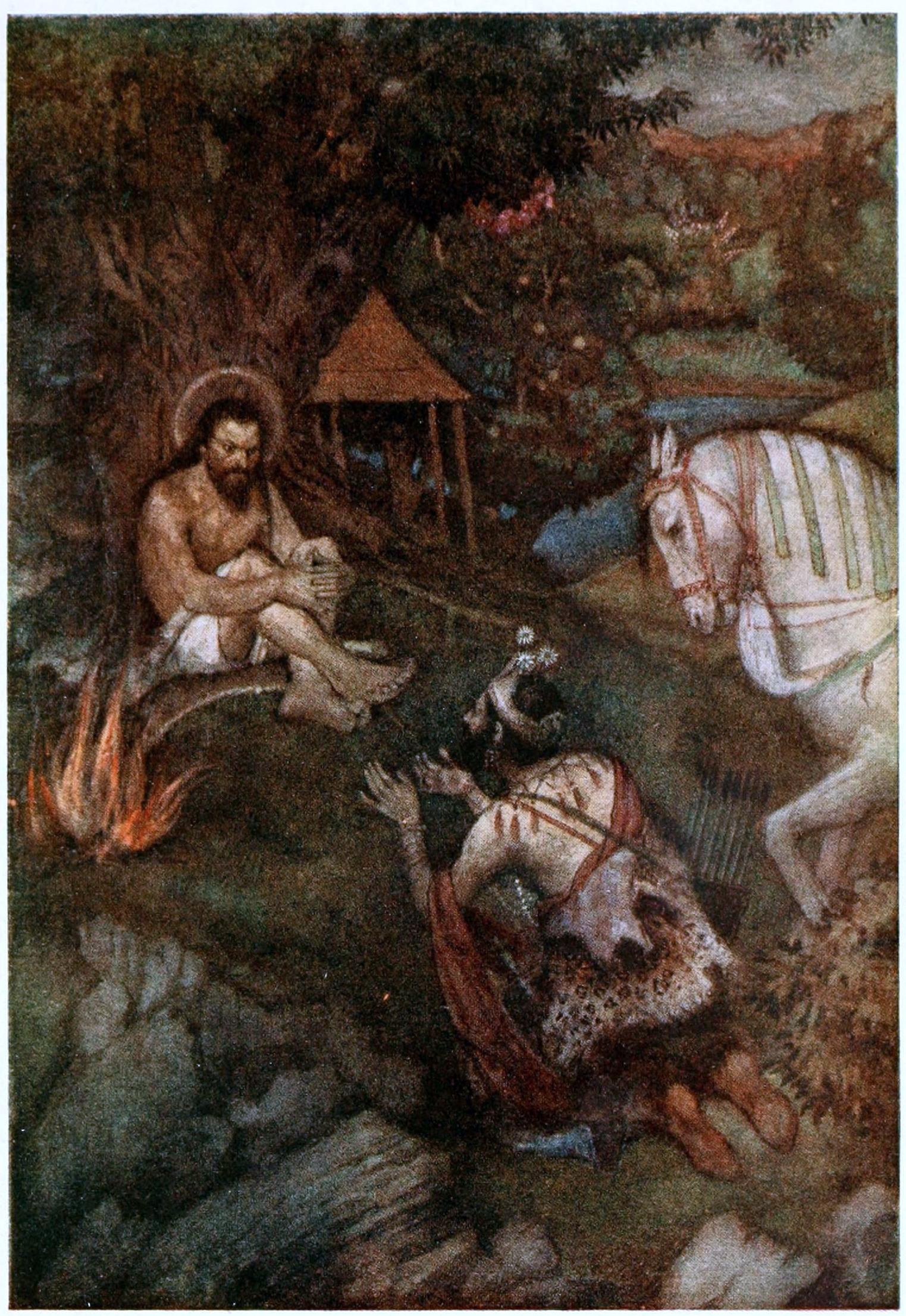
Harishchandra and Vishvamitra

In the Puranas, Harishchandra is the son of Trishanku. The Vishnu Purana mentions him, but does not describe his life in detail. The Markandeya Purana contains a detailed legend about his life, narrated by wise birds to the sage Jaimini. The Bhagavata Purana mentions him as the father of Sagara and grandfather of Badaka, and contains a legend about his descendants.

==== Markandeya Purana ====
The Markandeya Purana legend is as follows:

King Harishchandra lived in the Treta Yuga. He was an honest, noble king. His subjects enjoyed prosperity and peace. He had a queen named Shaivya (also called Taramati) and a son named Rohitashva. Once, while on a hunting expedition, he heard the cries of a woman asking for help. Armed with a bow and arrow, he went in the direction of the sound. The sound was an illusion created by Vighnaraja, the lord of the obstacles. Vighnaraja was trying to disturb the tapasya (meditation) of the sage Vishvamitra. This disturbed Vishwamitra's tapasya, and destroyed all the knowledge that the sage had acquired during this tapasya.

When Harishchandra came to his senses, he realized that the sage was extremely angry with him, and apologized. He promised to fulfill any of the sage's desires to get rid of his guilt. Vishvamitra demanded dakshina (donation) for his rajasuya yajna. The king asked him what he wanted in payment. In response, Vishvamitra said "Give me all that you have except yourself, your wife and your child." Harishchandra agreed to the demand. He let go of all his possessions – even his clothes. As he readied to leave his palace with his family, Vishvamitra demanded another donation. Harishchandra said that he did not have any possession left, but promised to make another donation within a month.

Harishchandra started living in penury with his wife and his family. His loyal subjects followed him. When Vishvamitra saw the king with his subjects, he started cursing Harishchandra for taking along his subjects (who were a part of the kingdom donated to the sage). The king then decided to leave the kingdom with his family. To make them go away sooner, Vishvamitra started beating the queen with a stick. When the five guardians of the directions saw this, they condemned Vishvamitra. The sage cursed them to be born as human beings. These guardian deities were born as the sons of the Pandavas and Draupadi.

Nearly a month after leaving his kingdom, Harishchandra arrived in the holy city of Kashi, only to see Vishvamitra already present there. The sage demanded the donation that the king had promised him. Harishchandra pointed out that there was still some time left in completion of one month. The sage agreed to come back at the next sunset and departed. As his hungry son cried for food, Harishchandra worried how would he be able to make a donation to the sage. His wife Shaivya suggested that he sell her to get some money. After some hesitation, Harishchandra accepted the proposal and sold her to an elderly man. Their child would not let go of his mother, so it was decided that he would accompany his mother (and an extra payment was made for him).

Soon after, Vishvamitra appeared again and demanded the donation. Harishchandra gave him all the money he had received from the sale of his wife and son. However, Vishvamitra was unhappy with the donation, and demanded more. Harishchandra then decided to sell himself. An outcaste chandala (actually Yama in disguise) offered to buy him, but Harishchandra's self-respect as a high-caste Kshatriya would not allow this. He instead offered to be Vishwamitra's slave. Vishvamitra agreed, but then declared "Since you are my slave, you must obey me. I sell you to this chandala in exchange of gold coins." The chandala paid the sage, and took along Harishchandra as a slave.

The chandala employed Harishchandra as a worker at his cremation ground. He directed Harishchandra to collect fees for every body cremated there: a part of the fee would go to the chandala, a part would be given to the local king, and the rest would be Harishchandra's remuneration. Harishchandra started living and working at the cremation ground. One day, he dreamed about his past lives, and realized that his current condition was a result of his past sins. During this nightmare, he also saw his queen crying before him. When he woke up, he saw his queen actually crying before him. She held the dead body of their son, who had died of a snake bite. Thinking of his misfortune, Harishchandra contemplated suicide, but realized that he would continue to pay for his sins in his next life.

Meanwhile, the queen readied to cremate their son's cadaver. But, Harishchandra told her that he would not let her do so without paying the fee. Meanwhile, all the deities appeared led by Yama and accompanied by Vishvamitra. They praised Harishchandra for his good qualities, and invited him to heaven.

But Harishchandra refused to go to heaven without his public who have lamented over his departure from his kingdom. He believes that they are the equal sharer in his merits and that he will only go heaven when his people also accompany him. He requested the king of devas, Indra to allow his people to go to heaven at least for a single day. Indra accepts his request, and he along with his people ascend to the heaven.

After his ascension to heaven, Vashistha – the sage of Harishchandra's royal dynasty – ended his tapasya of twelve years. He learned of what had happened to Harishchandra during these years. He quarreled with Vishvamitra, but was ultimately pacified by Brahma. Brahma explained to him that Vishvamitra was only testing the king, and had actually helped him ascend to heaven.

==== Devi Bhagavata Purana ====
The Devi Bhagavata Purana contains a story similar to the one mentioned in the Markandeya Purana, but also contains a reference to the Aitareya Brahamana legend. This legend is narrated by Vyasa to Janamejaya. It starts with Vashistha – the sage of Harishchandra's royal dynasty – praising the king's honesty and noble character. Vishvamitra objects to this, pointing out that Harishchandra was ready to sacrifice Sunahshepa, a human. He promises to prove that Harishchandra is not of noble character, and tricks the king into breaking his tapasya. The rest of the story is similar to the Markandeya Purana version, with minor variations.

=== Mahabharata ===
In Mahabharata, Narada tells Yudhishthira that Harishchandra is a rajarshi (king-sage), and the only earthly king who finds a place in the assembly of gods. According to Narada, Harishchandra was a powerful emperor, and all the kings on earth accepted his suzerainty. He performed the rajasuya yajna. After completing the rituals, he gratified the Brahmins with delicacies, gave them what they wanted and gifted them jewels. For this reason, he finds a place alongside Indra (the king of the gods).

== In popular culture ==
Poet Raghavanka's Harishchandra Literature from 12th century in Kannada language is a very popular and acclaimed epic on the life of Harishchandra.

Harishchandra has been the subject of many films in India. The earliest is Raja Harishchandra from 1913, written and directed by Dhundiraj Govind Phalke. It was the first full-length Indian feature film. The first "talkie" of Marathi cinema, Ayodhyecha Raja (1932) directed by V. Shantaram, was also based on his life, starring Govindrao Tembe and Durga Khote in the lead roles. The film was later remade under the name Ayodhya Ka Raja (1932) in Hindi, making it the first double-language talkie of Indian cinema.

Telugu cinema has also produced films on this Hindu mythological subject: in 1935 one titled Harishchandra was directed by P. Pullaiah starring Addanki Srirama Murthy and P. Kannamba; in 1960 another with the same title was directed by Jampana Chandrashekara Rao and starred S. V. Ranga Rao and C. Lakshmi Rajyam. The acclaimed Satya Harishchandra (1965 Telugu film) was produced and directed by K. V. Reddy under Vijaya Productions. It stars N. T. Rama Rao and S. Varalakshmi. K. V. Reddy produced the film simultaneously in Kannada with the same title, starring Dr. Rajkumar.

K. B. Nagabhushanam directed Harischandra (1944 film) in Tamil starring P. U. Chinnappa and P. Kannamba. In later years it was remade again in Tamil with the title of Harichandra (1968 film), directed by K. S. Prakash Rao starring Sivaji Ganesan and G. Varalakshmi which was popularly acclaimed for acting and dialogue. Also, in Tamil popular colloquial usage, Raja Harishchandra is synonymous with absolute adherence to the truth. A person is often chided as being "a Raja Harishchandra", if he tries to cling to truth even to the detriment of those related to him.

The Kannada epic Satya Harishchandra (1965 Kannada film) was based on 12th century Hoysala poet Raghavanka's work, Harishchandra Kavya starring Rajkumar. At the 13th National Film Awards, the film was awarded the President's silver medal for the Best Feature Film in Kannada. The film was hugely successful at its release and is considered a milestone in Kannada cinema. Satya Harishchandra was the third Indian and first South Indian film to be digitally coloured. The coloured version, released in April 2008, was a commercial success.

In 1985, a Bengali language film Harishchandra Shaibya was released based on the life of King Harishchandra. This film was directed by Ardhendu Chatterjee. It also said that Harishchandra was a truthful man, who never lied and is therefore also called Satyavadi (one who always speaks the truth). The king and the god tale was based on him.

== Shrines ==
- A temple of Harishchandra is situated in Harishchandra Pimpri, Wadwani taluka, Beed district, Maharashtra
- The cremation ground of Kashi - (modern name Varanasi) is named Harishcandra Ghat

== See also ==
- Chandrahasa
- Bharata
- Suryavamsha
- The king and the god
