= List of Marathi films of 1910–1919 =

A list of films produced by the Marathi language film industry based in Maharashtra in the year 1910–1919.

== 1910–1919 Releases ==
A list of Marathi films released in 1910–1919.

Year	Film	Director	Cast	Release date	Production	Notes	Source
1912	Shree Pundalik	Dadasaheb Torne		18 May 1912	Dadasaheb Torne	first feature-length Indian film (Marathi)	
1913	Raja Harishchandra	Dadasaheb Phalke	D. D. Dabke, P. G. Salunke, Bhalachandra, D. Phalke, G. V. Sane	3 May 1913	Dadasaheb Phalke	first full-length Indian feature film With Marathi, Hindi & English intertitles	
1913	Mohini Bhasmasur	Dadasaheb Phalke	Kamlabai Gokhale, Durgabai Kamat	November 1913	Dadasaheb Phalke	Silent Film With Marathi intertitles	
1914	Satyavan Savitri	Dadasaheb Phalke			Dadasaheb Phalke	Silent Film With Marathi intertitles	
1915	Tilak's Week	Dadasaheb Phalke			Dadasaheb Phalke	Silent Film With Marathi intertitles	
1916							
1917	Lanka Dahan	Dadasaheb Phalke	Anna Salunke, Ganpat G. Shinde	Dadasaheb Phalke		Silent Film With Marathi intertitles	
1917	Satyavadi Raja Harishchandra	Dadasaheb Phalke	D.D. Dabke, Bhalachandra D. Phalke, Anna Salunkeunke	Dadasaheb Phalke		Remake of Silent Film Raja Harishchandra With Marathi intertitles	
1918	Shri Krishna Janma	Dadasaheb Phalke				Silent Film With Marathi intertitles	
1919	Kaliya Mardan	Dadasaheb Phalke				Silent Film With Marathi intertitles	
