= Marathi cinema =

- No. of screens: Approximately 610 in Maharashtra state of India
- Main distributors: Aatpat Production; Rasika Productions; Dreaming 24/7 Productions; Almonds Creations; Everest Entertainment; Pickle Entertainment and Media; AP Communications; Swarali Films Creation; Six Sense Film Production; Mulakshar Productions; Planet Marathi

Produced feature films (2022)
- Total: 120 (Theatrical)

Number of admissions (2023)
- Total: 2 crore

Gross box office (2023)
- National films: India: ₹201 crore (US$21 million)

Marathi cinema is the segment of Indian cinema dedicated to the production of motion pictures in the Marathi language, widely spoken in the state of Maharashtra. Based out of Mumbai, it is the oldest film industry in India and a leader in filmmaking in the Indian film industry.

Raja Harishchandra, directed by Dadasaheb Phalke and released in 1913, was the first Marathi-language film ever made, and was also India's first full-length feature film. The claim is disputed and some claim that Dadasaheb Torne's Shree Pundalik (1912) was the first film made in Maharashtra. The first Marathi Sound film film was Ayodhyecha Raja, released in 1932, one year after Alam Ara, the first Hindi talkie film. All Marathi films until then were silent films with intertitles. Pinjara (1972), directed by V. Shantaram, was first colour film in Marathi cinema.

Kolhapur was a centre for film production during the 20th century, though currently, a majority of films are made in Mumbai. During Marathi cinema's infancy between the 1910s and 1930s, which only had silent films, the majority of films were made on Hindu mythological subjects. Later during the 1970s, films were made on rural stories. Between the 1980s and 1990s, comedy and thriller films started to flourish. Since the turn of the millennium, there have been films based on social subjects and biographical dramas. Although the industry is much smaller than Hindi cinema, also based in Mumbai, Marathi cinema has been declared tax-exempt by the Government of Maharashtra, and has been experiencing growth in recent years.

== History ==
=== Origins: 1913–1925 ===
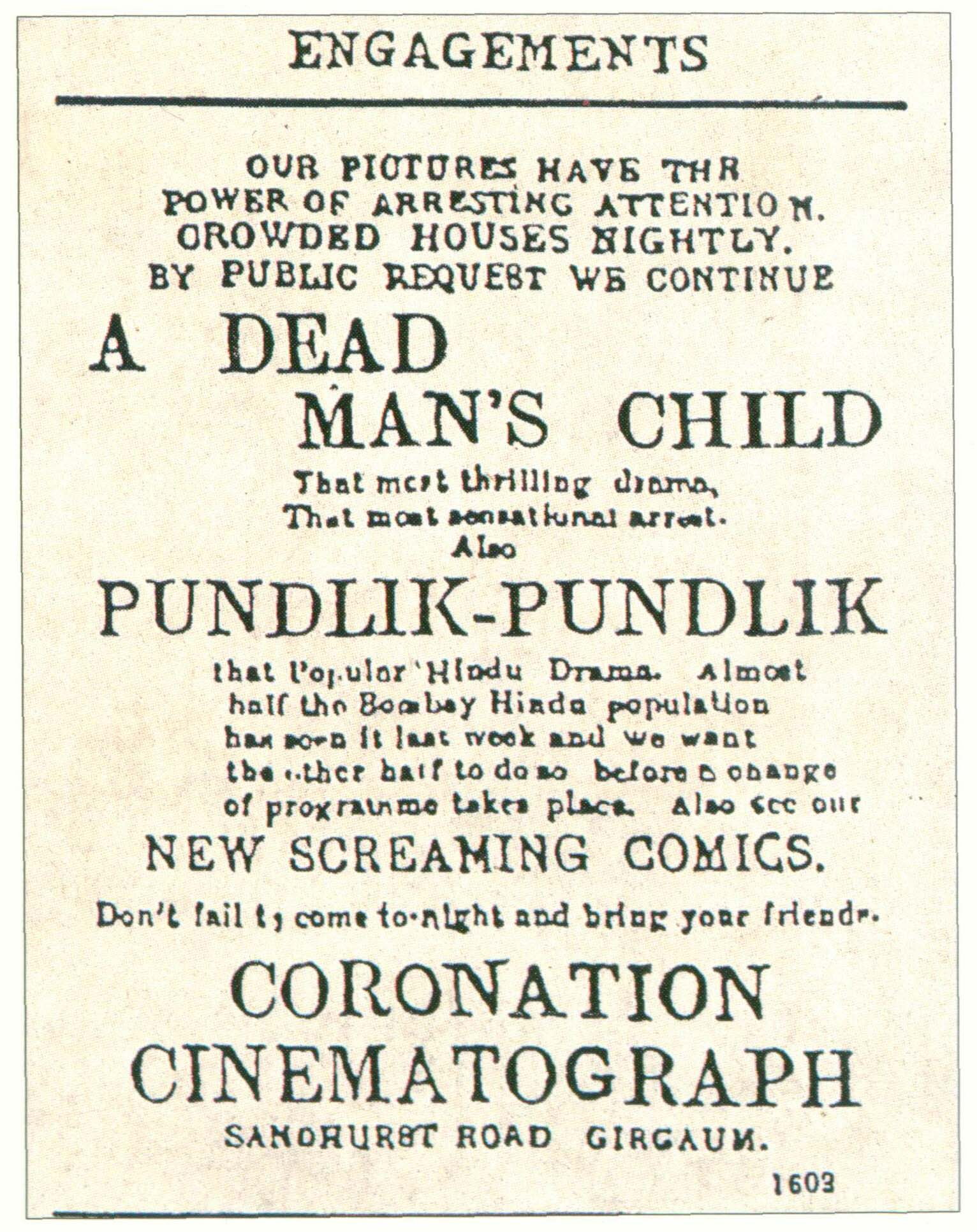
Advertisement in the Times of India of 25 May 1912 announcing the screening of the first feature film of India, Pundalik, by Dadasaheb Torne

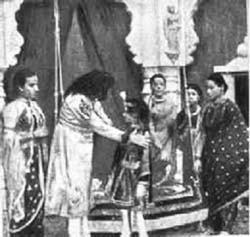
Raja Harishchandra (1913)

Marathi cinema is the oldest film industry in India. Dadasaheb Phalke is widely considered a pioneer and the founder of Marathi cinema and, to a greater extent, the cinema of India. He brought the revolution of motion pictures to India with his first indigenously made film, Raja Harishchandra, released in 1913.

Although the film had Marathi and English intertitles, it is considered a Marathi film by IFFI and NIFD, citing that, while filming, Phalke had employed a full Marathi crew, including actors.

Some claim that the first ever Marathi movie was Shree Pundalik, directed by Dadasaheb Torne, and related on 18 May 1912 at Coronation Cinematograph, Bombay. However, some dispute this, claiming that it is not considered the first Marathi film as it was allegedly a recording of a then popular theater play. The cameraman who filmed that movie, Jonson, was a British national; it was processed in London; and the negative also remained in the United Kingdom.

Kolhapur was a centre of film production in the twentieth century. Maharashtra Film Company's Sairandhri (1920), starring Balasaheb Pawar, Kamala Devi and Zunzarrao Pawar, was the first Indian film to cast women artists. Sairandhri became the first Indian film to face censorship by the British Government. Because of his special interest in sets, costume design and painting, he chose episodes from Maratha history for interpreting in the new medium and specialized in the historical genre. Baburao Painter made many silent movies till 1930, including Surekha Haran (1921), for which he brought the best camera of the time, manufactured by Bell & Howell, and Savkari Pash (Indian Shylock) in 1925, a social film based on a short story by Narayan Hari Apte. Baburao was not particularly keen on the talkies, for he believed that they would destroy the visual culture so painfully evolved over the years.

=== The Transition to Sound: Early Talkies ===
Ayodhyecha Raja (1932), directed by V. Shantaram was the first talkie of Maharashtra and also the first double version talkie of Indian cinema; prior to it, all the movies were silent films with Marathi and English intertitles. It was released one year after the first sound film of the nation, Alam Ara (1931), and five years after the first Hollywood sound film, The Jazz Singer (1927), which is the first sound film made in the world. Bhalji Pendharkar's Shyam Sundar was the first talkie to be made in Pune and apparently the first Indian film with a continuious run of more than 25 weeks at West End (present Naaz Talkies, Mumbai).

As cinema grew in the Union of India, major production houses rose, and one of them was again a company owned wholly by Marathi people, the Prabhat Film Company. Prabhat's Sant Tukaram (1936) was the first Indian work to win the Best Film Award at the Venice Film Festival in 1937. In 1954, at the very first edition of the National Awards, Shyamchi Aai won the first President's Gold Medal for Cinema. It was directed by Pralhad Keshav Atre, and it was an adaptation of the eponymous novel by Pandurang Sadashiv Sane. Marathi cinema was in its full bloom by this time with the advent of greats like V. Shantaram, Master Vinayak, Bhalji Pendharkar and Pralhad Keshav Atre, followed by Raja Paranjape, Dinkar D. Patil, G. D. Madgulkar, Sudhir Phadke and Raja Thakur.

=== Golden Age: The Flourishing (1960s–1980s) ===
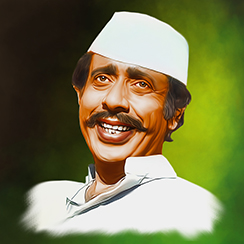
Nilu Phule, a legendary actor of the 1970s–1980s, achieved fame for playing villain roles with natural acting.

The 1960s saw the emergence of directors such as V. Shantaram and Anant Mane, who made Marathi films based on the folk art form Tamasha. Mane's Sawaal Majha Aika! (1964), marked his third Best Feature Film Award win and featured many popular songs. Shantaram's Pinjara (1972) was a major hit, becoming one of the biggest commercial successes of its time, and ran for an impressive 134 weeks in Pune. It was also the first Marathi film to be made in color.

Directors like Datta Dharmadhikari and Rajdutt later gained popularity for their traditional family dramas. Noteworthy films from this period include the family drama Manini (1961), the historical fiction Mohityanchi Manjula (1963) by Bhalji Pendharkar and the drama Aamhi Jato Amuchya Gava (1968), which took six years to make, was a big success upon release, while the comedy Pandu Havaldar (1975) brought Ashok Saraf into recognition.

By the early 1970s, Dada Kondke captured audiences with his distinct style of ribald humor, often incorporating sexual innuendo. His first film in this genre, Songadya (1971), was loosely inspired by Tamasha and featured a seductive heroine, a bumbling yet innocent hero, and dialogue filled with innuendo and sexual puns. Kondke's films, blending humor with social and political satire, became cult classics. Around the same time, Jabbar Patel's Samna (1974) marked a pivotal shift in Marathi cinema, offering a profound critique of systemic corruption and social inequities, further broadening the scope of the industry.

By this time, Marathi cinema largely gravitated towards either Tamasha-based films or traditional family dramas, alongside Kondke's signature comedies.

=== The Rise of Comedy and Star Power (mid 1980s–1990s) ===
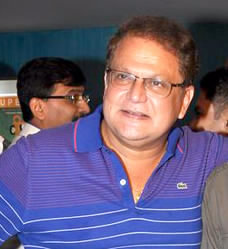
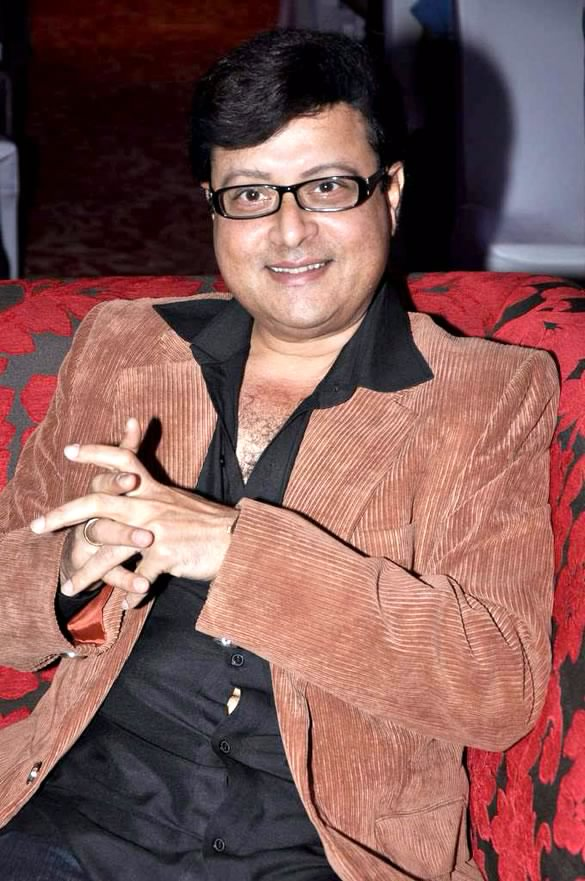
In 1980s directors Mahesh Kothare (left) and Sachin Pilgaonkar (right) emerged as successful directors by directing mainly comedy-thriller and comedy genre films respectively.

The mid-1980s saw two comedy heroes raised to stardom, Ashok Saraf and Laxmikant Berde, become popular superstars. In the mid 1980s Mahesh Kothare and Sachin Pilgaonkar made many box-office hit films. Kothare used to make action-comedy-thriller genre movies, while Pilgaonkar used to make mainly comedy movies. Pilgaonkar made hit classics such as buddy films Gammat Jammat (1987), Ashi Hi Banwa Banwi (1988), the latter becoming one of the highest-grossing Marathi films of its time, earning ₹3 crores. He also directed the supernatural revenge drama Bhutacha Bhau (1989), feel good movie Aayatya Gharat Gharoba (1991), Aamchya Sarkhe Aamhich (1990), and around the same time Kothare made hit films Dhum Dhadaka (1985), Dhadakebaaz (1990), De Danadan (1987), and horror-thriller Zapatlela (1993), which was an unofficial remake of Hollywood cult classic slasher film Child's Play (1988). He introduced technological advancements, such as the fact that he was the first director who filmed his movie in CinemaScope, used chroma key technique and did wire-flying in Dhadakebaaz, used puppetry in Zapatlela, he filmed Zapatlela 2 in 3D format, probably this film was the first ever Sequel made in Marathi cinema, and ventured into film genres such as Comedy horror, thriller, and fantacy. Both Kothare and Pilgaonkar acted and directed their respective films; latter even sang many songs for his movies. Other directors also made entertaining movies during this period, including Bin Kamacha Navra (1984), Aamhi Dogha Raja Rani (1986), Kalat Nakalat (1989), Chaukat Raja (1991), Ek Hota Vidushak (1992) and Sawat Mazi Ladki (1993). Following the significant success of Maherchi Sadi (1991), starring Alka Kubal, which grossed a record ₹12 crores and became a landmark in Marathi cinema, the industry experienced a wave of family drama films. This surge saw filmmakers exploring relatable themes centered around family dynamics, societal values, and emotional narratives, further solidifying the family drama genre's popularity in Marathi cinema.

=== Challenges and Change: The Decline (mid 1990s–2000s) ===
While the theatre of Maharashtra earned recognition at the national level, the cinema failed to make a mark. A major reason was the proximity to the production centre of Hindi cinema, which encroached on the identity of Marathi cinema. Other reasons include the shortage of cinema halls for distribution due to poor marketing, a lack of money magnets, a vibrant theatre scene, and the emergence of private television. It also lacked the powerful lobby at the national level, unlike Cinema of South India, because the state encouraged Hindi cinema for profit mainly; the regional film industrial advantage being soaked up by Hindi cinema.

In the mid-2000s, Marathi cinema explored a range of compelling themes through films that resonated with audiences. Not Only Mrs. Raut (2003) highlighted women's struggles against exploitation, while Aga Bai Arrecha! (2004) humorously depicted a man's frustration with city life and his ability to hear women's thoughts. Saatchya Aat Gharat (2004) tackled the serious issue of sexual assault, and Dombivli Fast (2005) followed a middle-class man's fight against corruption and injustice. Uttarayan (2004) told a touching story of elderly love, Jatra: Hyalagaad Re Tyalagaad (2006) revitalized the comedy genre, and Saade Maade Teen (2007) became a cult classic. Made on a modest budget of ₹1 crore, the film earned ₹3 crore at the box office, making it one of the highest-grossing Marathi films of its time. In 2007, the Marathi film industry achieved a turnover of ₹100 crore, marking a 42% growth. Despite the success of these films, it was Shwaas that truly put Marathi cinema on the national map. Winning the Golden Lotus National Award and becoming India's official entry for the Academy Awards, it marked a turning point and symbolized the industry's potential for global recognition. It won the President's Medal for best film, beating Bollywood's prolific output with quality. Shwaas was the second Marathi film to win the President's Medal after Shyamchi Aai (1950).

In 2009, Harishchandrachi Factory (with a budget of Rs. 6 crore) told the struggle of Dadasaheb Phalke in making Raja Harishchandra (1913), directed by theatre-veteran Paresh Mokashi. It was selected as India's official entry to the Academy Awards in the Academy Award for Best International Feature Film category, making it the second Marathi film, after Shwaas, to receive this honour.

Road film De Dhakka (2008), satire film Nishani Dava Anghatha (2009) based on failure of government of India's adult education program, political satire Gallit Gondhal Dillit Mujra (2009), film raising state's farmar's issue, rampant corruption in government officials, satire Jau Tithe Khau (2007), Kaydyach Bola (2005) and the social drama Jogwa (2009) made impacts on the audience's mind during this period.

=== Revitalization: The Resurgence in the 2010s ===
Since the beginning of the new decade in 2010, Marathi cinema has witnessed a remarkable resurgence with the release of several contemporary artistic films, including Vihir (2009), Deool (2011), Mala Aai Vhhaychy! (2011), Fandry (2013), Ek Hazarachi Note (2014), Elizabeth Ekadashi (2014), Ventilator (2016), and Mulshi Pattern (2018), which have collectively given a new direction to Marathi films. Noteworthy films such as Natarang (2010), Shikshanachya Aaicha Gho (2010), Kaksparsh (2012), Duniyadari (2013), Lai Bhaari (2014), Timepass (2014), Katyar Kaljat Ghusali (2015), and Natsamrat (2016) achieved both commercial success and critical acclaim. The latter became the first Marathi film to cross the ₹50 crore (approximately $7.8 million) mark during its theatrical run. During this decade, several films sparked controversies, including Zenda (2010), Lalbaug Parel (2010), Mi Shivajiraje Bhosale Boltoy! (2010), Sanngto Aika (2014), Nude (2018), and Dashakriya (2017), which ignited discussions by touching upon sensitive issues like caste, religion, politics, and societal norms.

The decade also marked the rise of biographical films such as Mee Sindhutai Sapkal (2010), Balgandharva (2011), Dr. Prakash Baba Amte (2014), Lokmanya: Ek Yugpurush (2015), Ekk Albela (2016), Ani... Dr. Kashinath Ghanekar (2018), and Anandi Gopal (2019). Moreover, the adult comedy genre gained prominence with films like No Entry Pudhe Dhoka Aahey (2012), Takatak (2019), and Boyz (2017). The superhero genre was introduced with Baji, the first film of its kind in Marathi cinema. In the late 2010s, historical films began to gain attraction, particularly through the works of director Digpal Lanjekar, who created a series titled Shri Shivraj Ashtak, focusing on the Maratha Empire.

Deool, directed by Umesh Vinayak Kulkarni, made history by becoming the third Marathi film to win the National Film Award for Best Feature Film, following Shyamchi Aai and Shwaas. Its sequel, Deool Band (2015), also garnered significant attention from audiences. Acclaimed director Jabbar Patel emphasized the transformative nature of contemporary Marathi cinema, stating, "The kind of Marathi cinema that is being made today is very fresh and different. This is thanks to directors and writers getting exposed to world cinema via television and film festivals. They are coming up with new storylines and innovative concepts." With the outstanding contributions from various producers and directors within the Mumbai film industry, Marathi cinema notably outshone other Indian film industries, in box office collections and critical appreciation during the first quarter of 2010.

The landmark film Sairat (2016), a romantic drama directed by Nagraj Manjule and starring Rinku Rajguru and Akash Thosar, emerged as a game-changer, becoming the biggest weekend opener for a Marathi film and breaking records previously held by Natsamrat. Sairat was the first Marathi film to gross over ₹100 crore (approximately $16 million) worldwide, solidifying its status as a cultural phenomenon. The decade saw directors such as Nagraj Manjule, Ravi Jadhav, Satish Rajwade, Aditya Sarpotdar and Sanjay Jadhav making significant contributions to the industry.

=== The New Wave and challenges (2020s–present) ===
The COVID-19 pandemic had a profound impact on the Marathi film industry, as it did on cinema worldwide. With theaters closing and production halting, many films scheduled for release were postponed, leading to significant financial losses for filmmakers and production houses. Approximately 110 Marathi language films remained unreleased due to the pandemic. The pandemic forced the industry to adapt rapidly, embracing digital platforms for film releases, which allowed filmmakers to reach audiences. Films like Well Done Baby (2021) and The Disciple (2021) were released straight on streaming platforms. Additionally, Picasso, directed by Abhijeet Mohan Warang, was the first Marathi film to have a direct digital release. It also marked the first time a Marathi film documented Dashavatara, an early form of folk theatre, in its original style.

As theaters reopened, the industry shifted its focus toward innovative storytelling and a variety of genres. The ensemble film Jhimma became the first to release in theaters post-pandemic, achieving significant success by running for 50 days, ultimately grossing over ₹14.07 crore. The following year 2022, is considered as one of the most successful year as many films were hit. The year highlighted a diverse range of genres, including the zombie comedy Zombivli, the historical action Pawankhind, the musical romantic Chandramukhi, the thriller Y, and the accidental drama Ananya. The year concluded with Ritesh Deshmukh's blockbuster film Ved, which grossed ₹75 crore (approximately $9.0 million), making it one of the highest-grossing Marathi films of all time. Additionally, Pondicherry became the first Marathi film to be entirely shot on smartphone, while Har Har Mahadev made history as the first Marathi film to be released in Telugu, Tamil, and Kannada languages. Throughout the decade, the industry continued to produce biographical, comedy, drama, and historical films, but woman-centric films reached new heights. Notably, Kedar Shinde's Baipan Bhaari Deva, centered around six elderly sisters, became the second highest-grossing Marathi film of all time, grossing over ₹92 crore and making history as the first female-centric movie to achieve such success. In 2024, Nach Ga Ghuma became the highest-grossing Marathi film of the year.

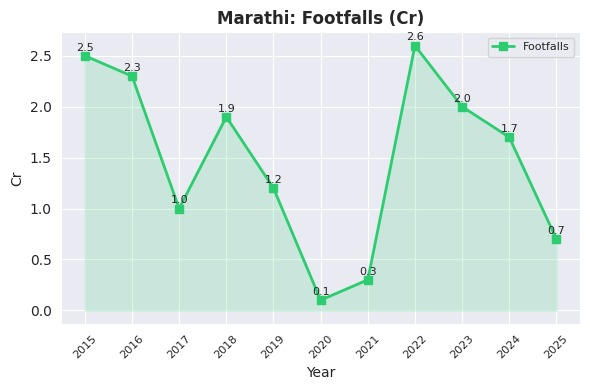
Marathi film attendance statistics (2015–2025)

In 2025, the industry witnessed a drastic decline in ticket sales due to the absence of successful franchise releases. Dashavatar was the only film to gross around ₹30 crore. The industry recorded approximately 70 lakh footfalls, the lowest in the last decade (excluding the COVID-19 period). Despite this, Sthal and Sabar Bonda received critical acclamation.

== Notable personalities ==
In the early days of Marathi cinema, theater experience was essential for actors. Dadasaheb Phalke, regarded as the father of Indian cinema, laid the foundation with his pioneering film Raja Harishchandra in 1913. During this period, acting styles in Marathi films were heavily influenced by stage performances.

With the advent of sound in the 1930s, a shift toward more naturalistic acting emerged in Marathi cinema, although traces of the theatrical style remained. V. Shantaram, a prominent actor-director of the era, introduced a more refined approach to acting. Renowned actors of this time included Shanta Apte, Durga Khote, Lalita Pawar, Meenakshi Shirodkar, Shobhna Samarth, Chandrakant Mandare, Shahu Modak, Master Vinayak, and Baburao Pendharkar.

Following India's independence, Marathi filmmakers began to focus on mythology and pressing social issues such as caste discrimination, women's rights, and the struggles of rural populations. The 1950s and 1960s are often considered the golden era of Marathi cinema, with filmmakers like V. Shantaram, Bhalji Pendharkar, Anant Mane, Raja Paranjape, and Raja Thakur creating impactful works. Notable actors of this period included Sulochana Latkar, Sandhya Shantaram, Hansa Wadkar, Usha Kiran, Chandrakant Gokhale, Raja Gosavi, Suryakant Mandhare, and Ramesh Deo. Rising to fame in the late 1950s, Jayshree Gadkar became one of the most influential actresses of the 1960s after her memorable performance in Sangtye Aika. In recognition of Marathi cinema, the Maharashtra government launched the annual Maharashtra State Film Awards, with Prapanch being the first film to win the Best Film award. Anant Mane is also credited for sustaining Marathi cinema with his groundbreaking work on Tamasha films.

The 1970s saw the rise of Dada Kondke, who became a leading figure by producing and directing hit films like Songadya, Ekta Jeev Sadashiv, Andhala Marto Dola, Pandu Havaldar, Tumcha Aamcha Jamala, Ram Ram Gangaram, Bot Lavin Tithe Gudgulya, Aali Angavar, and Hyoch Navra Pahije. He holds a Guinness World Record for delivering nine silver jubilee hits at the box office. This decade also introduced notable actors such as Smita Patil, Usha Chavan, Usha Naik, Asha Kale, Anjana Mumtaz, Nilu Phule, Kashinath Ghanekar, Shreeram Lagoo, Ravindra Mahajani, and Vikram Gokhale.

The 1980s were dominated by Ashok Saraf and Laxmikant Berde, who were regarded as the superstars of Marathi cinema. Ashok Saraf featured in over 300 films, portraying a variety of leading roles, while Sachin Pilgaonkar gained widespread recognition for his film Ashi Hi Banwa Banwi, which became the first Marathi movie to gross 30 million at the box office. Mahesh Kothare is also credited for introducing the first cinemascope film, Dhadakebaaz, in 1990. Other notable personalities from the 1980s and 1990s include Nana Patekar, Ajinkya Deo, Nitish Bharadwaj, Prashant Damle, Ramesh Bhatkar, Sachin Khedekar, Ranjana Deshmukh, Varsha Usgaonkar, Nivedita Saraf, Supriya Pilgaonkar, Ashwini Bhave, Priya Berde, Alka Kubal, Sonali Kulkarni, Neena Kulkarni, and Mrinal Kulkarni.

In more recent times, actors like Upendra Limaye, Girish Kulkarni, Vikram Gokhale, Dilip Prabhavalkar, Atul Kulkarni, Kishor Kadam, Mohan Joshi, Swanand Kirkire, Parth Bhalerao, Siddharth Menon, Rohini Hattangadi, Pallavi Joshi, Amruta Subhash, Suhasini Mulay, Uttara Baokar, Rinku Rajguru, Mitalee Jagtap Varadkar, and Usha Jadhav have garnered critical acclaim, with receiving the National Film Award for acting. Contemporary figures such as Nagraj Manjule, Ashutosh Gowariker, Makarand Deshpande, Mahesh Manjrekar, Ashok Saraf, Laxmikant Berde, Sayaji Shinde, Sadashiv Amrapurkar, Siddharth Jadhav, Shreyas Talpade, Shivaji Satam, Mrunal Thakur, Radhika Apte, Sai Tamhankar, Urmila Matondkar, Sonali Bendre, Amruta Khanvilkar, Renuka Shahane, Sharvari, and Reema Lagoo have achieved national recognition for their contributions to cinema.

== Studios ==
Phalke Films Company is considered the first production house in Indian cinema, as the pioneering feature film Raja Harishchandra was produced under its banner. Other notable films produced by the company include Satyavan Savitri (1914) and Lanka Dahan (1917). After the success of Lanka Dahan, several prominent figures, including Bal Gangadhar Tilak, Ratanji Tata, and actress Fatma Begum, approached Phalke with offers to convert the company into a limited company, but he declined. However, Phalke eventually accepted a partnership with Waman Apte, Laxman Phatak, Mayashankar Bhatt, Madhavji Jesingh, and Gokuldas Damodar, leading to the company's conversion into "Hindustan Cinema Films Company". The first film produced under this new venture was Shri Krishna Janma.

In 1917, Baburao Painter, popularly known as Baburao Painter, founded the Maharashtra Film Company with the support of the Maharaja of Kolhapur. His first significant historical film, Sairandhri (1920), was well-received. Although the studio initially focused on silent films, it closed its doors in 1930 following the advent of sound. Members such as Vishnupant Damle, Sheikh Fattelal, and V. Shantaram had left in 1929 to establish Prabhat Film Company. By 1932, eight Marathi films had been released, three of which were by Prabhat Film Company, which went on to dominate the industry with 18 films in the following decade—more than any other studio in the pre-independence era. Prabhat's first major hit was Shantaram's Amrit Manthan (1934). In 1933, Prabhat Film Company undertook the ambitious project of making Sairandhri the first color film in Indian cinema, processing it at UFA Studios in Germany, but the results were unsatisfactory. After Prabhat shifted its operations to Pune, Shahu Maharaj of Kolhapur helped found Kolhapur Cinestone in collaboration with the Pendharkar brothers and Master Vinayak. Shahu Maharaj aimed to establish Kolhapur as the "Hollywood of Marathi Cinema". However, the studio produced only three films and closed after the failure of Phalke's Gangavataran (1937).

In the early 1940s, Shantaram founded his own production house, Rajkamal Kalamandir, which later produced notable films such as Lokshahir Ram Joshi (1947) and Pinjra (1972), both the films based on Tamasha genre. During this period, many producers ventured into filmmaking under their own banners, with notable examples including Anant Mane's Chetana Pictures and Dada Kondke's Sadicha Chitra, the latter featuring Kondke himself in leading roles. However, despite the number of films being produced during this era, few production houses managed to establish a lasting name in the industry. In the mid-1980s, Mahesh Kothare founded his production house, Jenma Films, under which he produced and directed more than ten successful films, later founding its spin-off, Kothare Vision, in 2008. Around the same time, Shantaram's son also ventured into production, establishing V. Shantaram Productions, further extending the family's legacy in Marathi cinema. Under this banner, he delivered superhit films like Balache Baap Brahmachari and Ashi Hi Banwa Banwi, which became classics in Marathi film history. This era also marked the rise of two influential female producers, Uma Bhende and Smita Talwalkar, who made their mark with their production houses, Shri Prasad Chitra and Asmita Chitra, respectively, contributing significantly to the industry's growth.

== Landmark films ==
Year	Title	Director	Notes	Ref.
1913	Raja Harishchandra	Dadasaheb Phalke	First Indian feature film.	
1932	Ayodhyecha Raja	V. Shantaram	First talkie in Marathi directed by V. Shantaram.	
1932	Shyam Sundar	Bhalji Pendharkar	First Indian film to have theatrical run of more than twenty-five weeks in Bombay.	
1936	Sant Tukaram	Vishnupant Govind Damle	First Indian film to receive international recognition.	
1937	Kunku	V. Shantaram	First superhit at the Marathi box office.	
1939	Manoos	V. Shantaram	First social realist film	
1951	Amar Bhoopali	V. Shantaram	First film to enter the Cannes Film Festival's Official Competition and won Best Sound Recording Award	
1954	Shyamchi Aai	Pralhad Keshav Atre	First Indian film to win a National Film Award for Best Feature Film.	
1959	Sangtye Aika	Anant Mane	First golden jubilee at the Marathi box office	
1962	Prapanch	Madhukar Pathak	First film to win Maharashtra State Film Award for Best Film.	
1964	Pathlaag	Raja Paranjape	First crime thriller film in Marathi.	
1965	Sadhi Mansa	Bhalji Pendharkar	First neo realistic film in Marathi.	
1972	Pinjara	V. Shantaram	First colour film in Marathi using Eastmancolor.	
1976	Ha Khel Sawalyancha	Vasant Joglekar	First horror film in Marathi.	
1977	Bala Gau Kashi Angai	Kamlakar Torne	First film to be shot outdoors.	
1982	Umbartha	Jabbar Patel	First Marathi film to show LGBTQ community.	
1988	Ashi Hi Banwa Banwi	Sachin	First Marathi film to gross over ₹3 crore at the box office.	
1989	Thartharat	Mahesh Kothare	First action Marathi film.	
1990	Dhadakebaaz	Mahesh Kothare	First cinemascope Marathi film.	
1991	Maherchi Sadi	Vijay Kondke	First Marathi film to gross ₹12 crore at the box office.	
1993	Zapatlela	Mahesh Kothare	First puppetry Marathi film.	
2000	Chimani Pakhar	Mahesh Kothare	First Dolby Digital Marathi film.	
2004	Shwaas	Sandeep Sawant	First Marathi film submitted as India's official entry to the Oscars for consideration in the Best Foreign Language Film category.	
2004	Pachhadlela	Mahesh Kothare	First Marathi film to use computer generated effects.	
2007	Zabardast	Mahesh Kothare	First science fiction Marathi film.	
2012	Kaksparsh	Mahesh Manjrekar	First Marathi film to get a home video release in Blu-ray format.	
2013	Zapatlela 2	Mahesh Kothare	First 3D Marathi film.	
2015	Baji	Nikhil Mahajan	First superhero film of Marathi.	
2016	Natsamrat	Mahesh Manjrekar	First Marathi film to gross ₹50 crores at the box office.	
2016	Sairat	Nagraj Manjule	First Marathi film to gross ₹100 crores at the box office.	
2021	Picasso	Abhijeet Mohan Warang	First Marathi film to be released directly on the over-the-top (OTT) platform	
2022	Har Har Mahadev	Abhijeet Deshpande	First Marathi pan-Indian film.	
2022	Pondicherry	Sachin Kundalkar	First feature film shot entirely on a mobile phone camera.	
2026	Ghabadkund	Pritam SK Patil	First Marathi Cinematic Universe	
2026	Raja Shivaji	Riteish Deshmukh	First Marathi film to be released with a budget of ₹75 crores	

== Awards ==
- Maharashtra State Film Awards
- Filmfare Awards Marathi
- Zee Chitra Gaurav Puraskar
- Fakt Marathi Cine Sanman
- Maharashtracha Favourite Kon?
- National Film Awards
- Sakal Premier Awards
- Pune International Film Festival
- Maharashtra Times Sanman Awards
- Lokmat Sakhi Awards
- Pravah Picture Awards

== See also ==
- List of Marathi films
- List of Marathi film actresses
- List of Marathi film actors
- List of highest-grossing Marathi films
