= Pandit Narendra Sharma =

Indian poet (1913–1989)

- Born: 28 February 1913; Jahangirpur, Tehsil Khurja of Bulandshahr, United Provinces of Agra and Oudh, British India
- Died: 12 February 1989 (aged 75); Mumbai, Maharashtra, India
- Occupations: poet, lyricist
- Spouse: Susheela Godiwala (m. 1947)
- Children: 4
- Writing career
- Language: Hindi
- Notable awards: Padma Bhushan

Pandit Narendra Sharma (28 February 1913 – 12 February 1989) was an Indian writer, poet and lyricist in Hindi language. He also wrote some songs for Indian Hindi cinema, like the title song for Satyam Shivam Sundaram (1979), for which he also received a Filmfare Award nomination for Best Lyricist.

== Early life ==
As per Pandit Narendra Sharma's daughter Lavanya Sharma Shah, he was born in Jahangirpur, Tehsil Khurja of district Bulandshahr, United Provinces in a Bharadwaj Brahmin family. He was only 4 years old when his father Purna Lal Sharma died. He was then raised and brought up by his uncle Ganpat Sharma and mother Ganga Devi. He was named by one of his uncles who, was a fan of Rabindranath Tagore. A child prodigy, Narendra was admitted straight to the seventh standard and was a top student in his class and was a favorite amongst the teachers. He passed his intermediate from Khurja following which, he joined Allahabad University and did his post graduation in English Literature and Education. His first book of poems School Phool (School Flowers) was released when he was 20 years old. To support his studies, he used to do tuitions and also worked as the sub-editor of Abhyudaya Hindi Daily Newspaper (circa 1934).

After completing his graduation, he taught English and Hindi poetry at Banaras Hindu University. Later, he joined the All India Congress Committee at Allahabad as Hindi secretary to Pandit Jawaharlal Nehru and later on, as a Hindi adhikari in February 1955.

His poems, which he penned in his youth, depicted love and longing and splendour of Nature. Later on, with the rise of the youth in attaining an independent India, his poems gradually turned patriotic. During AICC work, on the direct ordinance of then Viceroy, he was imprisoned and then, jailed withput trial by the British force. He then made friends with V. K. Krishna Menon, J. B. Kripalani etc. in Devli Detention Camp, and Rajasthan and Pune Jails. He started fasting till death and continued so for the next 2 weeks before he was force fed in order to keep him alive following which, he got released early. His mother Ganga Devi too starved for a week and waited for the arrival of her son from prison.

== Career ==
As per Lavanya Shah, Bhagwati Charan Verma approached and invited Sharma to come to Bombay to join Devika Rani's Bombay Talkies. He eventually made his film debut with Bombay Talkies' Hamari Baat (1943). He is best known for composing the title track to Raj Kapoor's Satyam Shivam Sundaram (1978). The philosophical lyrics weave a message about beauty, truth, and their divinity. He received his first Filmfare Award nomination for the popularity and complexity of this song.

Sharma wrote for more than hundred films and worked with almost all major music directors and singers. He was also the conceptual adviser of the popular TV Series Mahabharat, for which too he wrote songs. This was his last work which was released four months before his death in 1989. His last released film as a lyricist was Jalwa (1987).

== Personal life ==
There upon his first arrival in Bombay, Sharma came in touch with a Gujarati woman Susheela Godiwala whom, he married later on 12 May 1947. The day Susheela Godiwala entered as a newly married wife, M. S. Subbulakshmi sang the Mangal Geetam for her. Besides, writer Amritlal Nagar's wife Pratibha made Susheela stand on huge brass platter, filled with Kumkum filled water. Singer-actress Suraiya too sang songs to welcome Susheela. The other guests who were invited in the wedding bridal procession included actors Ashok Kumar and Dilip Kumar, music director Anil Krishna Biswas, flautist Panna Lal Ghosh, filmmaker brothers Chetan Anand and Vijay Anand (who was yet to enter the film industry), poet Sumitranandan Pant, filmmaker and writer Ramanand Sagar (who was yet to enter the film industry), poet and lyricist and poet Dr. Safdar 'Aah' Sitapuri etc. Several others from the art fraternity were also invited as Susheela was a graduate in Fine Arts from Haldenker's Institute. The wedding card of the Sharmas had an Easel shaped like a Lotus leaf and a pen was inserted in the middle in the form of a brush.

Narendra Sharma and Susheela Godiwala had three daughters - Vasvi, Lavanya Shah, Bandhavi and a son Paritosh.

Lata Mangeshkar the singer used to address him as her father while she was addressed as his daughter. In a documentary on Lata Mangeshkar produced and directed by Nasreen Munni Kabir for Britain's Channel 4 the singer has confessed that she learned a lot from pandithji and could negotiate many difficulties of life based on his advice. He was founder of Vividh Bharati Seva of All India Radio.

Sharma died on 12 February 1989 at the age of 75, 15 days short of his 76th birthday.

== Bibliography ==
The following are the poems written by Narendra Sharma

- Kahani Kehte Kehte
- Paniharin
- Rathwan
- Swagatham

== Filmography ==
Year	Film	Songs written	Music Director(s)	Notes
1943	Hamari Baat	9	Anil Krishna Biswas	Debut film
1944	Char Ankhen	8 (All)	Anil Krishna Biswas	
1944	Jwar Bhata	11 (All)	Anil Krishna Biswas	
1945	Pratima	7 (All)	Arun Kumar Mukherjee	
1947	Jail Yatra	2	Neenu Majumdar	
1947	Matwala Shair Ramjoshi	6	Vasant Desai	
1947	Meera		S. V. Venkatraman, Naresh Bhattacharya and Ramnath	
1947	Mera Suhag	8	Khemchand Prakash	
1947	Pul alias Bridge	6	Neenu Majumdar	
1948	Adalat	3	Datta Davjekar	
1948	Banwasi	4 (All)	Ram Ganguly	
1948	Mandir	12 (All)	Vasant Desai	
1948	Sant Tukaram	8 (All)	Snehal Bhatkar	
1948	Veena	5	Anil Krishna Biswas	
1949	Anyaya	1	Anil Krishna Biswas	
1949	Narsinh Avatar	11 (All)	Vasant Desai	The film's music records credited its songs' lyrics to Niranjan Sharna, ostensibly the actor who worked in the film. However, the film's press book credited Narendra Sharma as the lyricist. Film journalist and historian M. D. Soni corroborated this information with Narendra Sharma's son, Paritosh Sharma. M. D. Soni further discussed this with Niranjan Sharma's daughter, who confirmed that her father did not write lyrics for any Hindi film song. Based on this information, it can be concluded that the credits on the music records were wrong and that, Narendra Sharma penned the lyrics.
1949	Sant Janabai	23 (All)	Sudhir Phadke	
1949	Sati Ahalya	7 (All)	Snehal Bhatkar	
1949	Uddhār	9 (All)	Vasant Desai	
1950	Afsar	5	Sachin Dev Burman	
1950	Shrikrishna Darshan	9 (All)	Sudhir Phadke	
1951	Bari Bahoo	1	Anil Krishna Biswas	
1951	Deepak	2	Ram Ganguly	
1951	Ishwar Bhakti alias Shani Mahatmya	11 (All)	Sonik-Giridhar	
1951	Malti Madhav	9 (All)	Sudhir Phadke	
1951	Nand Kishore	9 (All)	Snehal Bhatkar	
1951	Sagar	10 (All)	S. K. Pal	
1952	Aandhiyan	8 (All)	Ali Akbar Khan	
1953	Jeewan Jyoti	1	Sachin Dev Burman	
1954	Mahatma Kabir	1	Anil Krishna Biswas	
1954	Radha Krishna	5	Sachin Dev Burman	
1955	Enam	1	Saraswati Devi	
1955	Joru Ka Bhai	1	Jaidev Verma	
1955	Ratna Ghar	5 (All)	Sudhir Phadke	
1956	Sajni	5	Sudhir Phadke	
1959	Gokul Ka Chor	2	Sudhir Phadke	
1961	Bhabhi Ki Chudiyan	8 (All)	Sudhir Phadke	
1969	Bhai Bahen	1	Shankar-Jaikishan	
1971	Maya Bazar	8 (All)	Shri Nath Tripathi	
1971	Phir Bhi	2	Raghunath Seth	
1976	Meera Shyam	3	Govind-Naresh	
1978	Satyam Shivam Sundaram	6	Laxmikant-Pyarelal	
1981	Akhand Saubhagyavati	5 (All)	Raj Kamal	
1982	Prem Rog	1	Laxmikant-Pyarelal	
1982	Subah	6 (All)	Hridaynath Mangeshkar	
1983	Doosri Dulhan	3	Bappi Lahiri	
1984	Ram Ki Ganga	At least 4	Hridaynath Mangeshkar	The audio release of this film happened in 1981 with the title Zindagi Imtehan Leti Hai. However, the film was released in 1984 with the title Ram Ki Ganga.
1987	Jalwa	2	Anand-Milind	Last release
