= Narasinha Avatar =

- Directed by: Sohrab Modi
- Written by: S. A. Shukla
- Produced by: Sohrab Modi
- Starring: Mahipal; Shobhana Samarth; Niranjan Sharma; Hari Shivdasani
- Cinematography: Y. D. Sarpotdar
- Music by: Vasant Desai; Narendra Sharma (lyrics)
- Production company: Minerva Movietone
- Release date: 7 October 1949
- Running time: 148 minutes
- Country: India
- Language: Hindi

Narasinha Avatar (The Incarnation of Narsinha) is a 1949 Hindi mythological film produced and directed by Sohrab Modi. Made under the Minerva Movietone banner, the film features music composed by Vasant Desai, with lyrics by Narendra Sharma. The story was written by S. A. Shukla, and the film starred Mahipal, Shobhana Samarth, Niranjan Sharma, Hari Shivdasani, Tiwari, S. N. Tripathi and Kamal.

The film is based on the Bhagavata Purana story of the fourth Avatar of the Hindu God Vishnu (Dashavatara) in the form of Narsimha. The half man, half lion Narsimha, destroys the Asura King Hiranyakashipu and instates his devotional son Prahlad as the rightful king.

== Plot ==
The Asura King Hiranyakashipu, having been granted the boon of immortality by Brahma, projects himself as Supreme Being, even beyond Vishnu, whom he wants to avenge for killing his brother Hirnayaksha. After years of penance Brahma grants Hiranyakashipu his boon where he asks not to be killed by man or animal, on earth or space, inside the house or outside, and neither at dawn or at night. In his arrogance he aims for filicide when his son Prahlada rejects him as the supreme power, worshipping only Vishnu as the true God. He makes several attempts at killing Prahlad, one of them by burning him on the pyre. Prahlad is inadvertently saved when Holika's, (sister of Hiranyakashipu) fire-proof veil lands on him and Holika gets burnt instead. Hiranyakashipu is further angered when Prahlad, on being asked if Vishnu exists in the pillar of the palace too, answers He is everywhere. Hiranyakashipu smashes the pillar and a half man half lion form appears. It is Narsimha (Vishnu’s Avatar). The enraged Narsimha stands on the threshold and places the King on his thighs. It is twilight time indicating neither day nor night making Hiranyakashipu no longer invincible. With his talons he rips Hiranyakashipu’s abdomen apart, thereby killing him. Before leaving he installs Prahlad as the new King.

== Cast ==
- Mahipal as Narad
- Shobhana Samarth as Kayadhu
- Niranjan Sharma as Hiranyakashipu
- Hari Shivdasani
- S. N. Tripathi
- Lakshman
- Tiwari
- Kanta Kumari
- Kamal

== Review And Remakes ==
Amrit Gangar in his book states that the film was hailed as a "mass entertainer" according to Filmindia 1949. He cites another reviewer of the time who pointed out the discrepancy in Holika's name, quoting H. H. Wilson (1840) that according to the Puranas, Hiranyakashipu's sister's name was Sinhika, and she was married to Viprachitta.

Several films have been made in India in different languages on the story of Prahlad and Narsimha. The first film version was made as Bhakta Prahlad (1926) by Dadasaheb Phalke. Since then nearly ten more films have been made with Bhakta Prahlad (1967) Telugu version cited as the best remake.

== Soundtrack ==
The music direction was by Vasant Desai with lyrics by Narendra Sharma. Lalita Deulkar, Lata Mangeshkar, Mohammed Rafi and Manna Dey provided the main playback singing.

=== Songlist ===
#	Title	Singer
1	Hari Ko Bisaro Na, Hari Na Bisarenge	Lata Mangeshkar
2	Charan Tumhare Phul Hamare	Lata Mangeshkar
3	Jagmag Taare Jhalke	Lata Mangeshkar
4	Bhaj Re Madhur Madhur Naam	Lata Mangeshkar, Manna Dey
5	Binti Suno Meri Door Hai Naino Ka Tara	Lalita Devulkar
6	Saaj Solah Kalao Se Chand Uga	Lalita Devulkar
7	Bhajo Vishnu Naam Khade Hari Mandir Dware	Lata Mangeshkar, Mohammed Rafi
8	Hey Mangalmay Bhagwan Karo Tum Sab Jag Ka Kalyan	
9	Narayan Jaago Jaago Karuna Nidhaan Jaago	Mohammed Rafi
10	Sevak Inka Devendra Indra	
11	Latpat Ke Pat Pehne Vikraal	Lata Mangeshkar, Manna Dey
