= Uddhar (1949 film) =

Uddhār
- Poster
- Directed by: S. S. Kulkarni
- Written by: Narendra Sharma (dialogues and lyrics)
- Story by: Balkrishna
- Starring: Dev Anand; Bharat Bhushan; Munawar Sultana; Nirupa Roy
- Cinematography: Kashinath
- Edited by: Datta Kodolikar
- Music by: Vasant Desai
- Production company: Pratibha Chitra Mandir
- Distributed by: Mohan Studios
- Release date: 1949
- Country: India
- Language: Hindi

Uddhār is 1949 Bollywood drama film directed by S. S. Kulkarni and starring Dev Anand, Bharat Bhushan and Nirupa Roy in lead roles.

== Cast ==
- Dev Anand
- Bharat Bhushan
- Nirupa Roy
- Munawar Sultana
- Pratima Devi
- Salvi
- Ram Singh
- Narmada Shankar
- Anwari
- Master Javed
- R. S. Dubey
- Tribhuvan Sinha
- Agha Shapoor
- Bismillah
- Ranjit Budhkar
- B. N. Kapoor

== Crew ==
- Director : S. S. Kulkarni
- Story Writer : Balkrishna
- Dialogue Writer and Lyricist : Narendra Sharma
- Music Director : Vasant Desai
- Playback Singers : Mohantara Talpade, Narayan, Vali and Lata Mangeshkar
- Sound : Harish Bhatt
- Cinematographer : Kashinath
- Choreographer : Badri Prasad
- Production-in-charge : Krishnarao Kalkundri
- Processor : Shyamrao Dhurandhar
- Backgrounds : V. G. Bavdekar
- Settings : Bahadur Mistry
- Still Photos : Chavan and Vengurlekar
- Production Managers : Anantrao Kodolikar and B. N. Kapoor

=== Assistant ===
- Director : D. Jagtap
- Cinematographer : M. Ram
- Dialogue Writer : Lalit Prasad
- Recordist : K. L. Marathe

== Soundtrack ==
Song	Singer(s)
"Boondon Ke Chalaye Baan Sanwari..."	
"Baadar Ki Chaadar Mein Bijuriya Aayi Re..."	Mohantara Talpade
"Maara Maara Firangi Tirangi Ne..."	Narayan and Vali
"Aaj Zindagi Ke Bandh Dwar Khul Gaye..."	Lata Mangeshkar
"Kaha Ram Hai Ram Phir Shrimukh Kabhi Na Khola..."	Lata Mangeshkar
"O Kabira Hinduon Ki Hinduai Dekhi, Turkan Ki Turkai..."	Lata Mangeshkar
"Patjhad Ke Gaye Din Beet Basanti Phool Khile..."	Lata Mangeshkar
"Raat Jaa Rahi Hai, Neend Aa Rahi Hai..."	Lata Mangeshkar
"Rangeen Gagan Peechhe Chhoota..."	Lata Mangeshkar
