= Satyam Shivam Sundaram =

1978 Indian Hindi-language film by Raj Kapoor

- Film poster
- Directed by: Raj Kapoor
- Written by: Jainendra Jain
- Produced by: Raj Kapoor
- Starring: Shashi Kapoor; Zeenat Aman
- Narrated by: Raj Kapoor
- Cinematography: Radhu Karmakar
- Edited by: Raj Kapoor
- Music by: Laxmikant–Pyarelal
- Production company: R. K. Studio
- Distributed by: Shemaroo Video Pvt. Ltd.
- Release date: 24 March 1978
- Running time: 172 minutes
- Country: India
- Language: Hindi

Satyam Shivam Sundaram (transl. The Truth, the God, the Beauty) (Note: Satyam Shivam Sundaram ("सत्यं शिवं सुन्दरम्") means the realization of truth and beauty through Shiva (cf. "Truth, Goodness, and Beauty" in Transcendentals).) is a 1978 Indian Hindi-language romantic drama film produced and directed by Raj Kapoor and written by Jainendra Jain, starring Shashi Kapoor and Zeenat Aman.

It talks about the differences between physical and spiritual love. The film was released on 24 March 1978 on the day of Holi.

== Plot ==
The story is set in a village where Roopa lives with her father, the village priest. As a child, the right side of Roopa's face and neck were burned by a pot of boiling oil, leaving part of her face disfigured. Henceforth, Roopa keeps her right cheek hidden under the veil of her sari. Despite the terrible accident, Roopa remains religious and goes to the village temple daily, singing hymns and devotional songs.

Rajeev is a dashing engineer who arrives in the village to oversee the operation of a major dam. He abhors anything ugly. He hears Roopa's lovely singing and meets her, but does not see her disfigured side, and falls in love with her. He then asks her father's permission to marry her. Rupa does not want to cheat Rajeev because she loves him deeply and first request his father to reject the marriage proposal. But everyone from the village requests her to change her mind and thereby she agrees to marry Rajeev thinking he may accept her with her condition as he claimed to love her truly.

After the wedding, Rajeev discovers the truth and thinks that he was cheated and forced to marry someone else, at that point he disowns Roopa and drives her out of the house. Rajeev roams around the village on the wedding night in search of another Roopa, as he thinks there is another girl with the same name, waiting for him. On the other side, after being rejected by Rajeev on their wedding night, Roopa decided to commit suicide but was rescued by Rajeev, when he thought he found the girl he falls in love with, not his wife. After being rescued, Roopa decides to meet him at night, using a veil to hide the scarred side of her face. Rajeev spends his days ignoring his wife, and his nights loving his mistress, not knowing they are both the same woman.

During one of their nights together, they make love and Roopa gets pregnant. When Rajeev finds out that his wife is pregnant, he accuses her of infidelity and refuses to believe that his "mistress" and wife are the same. He publicly shames her and sends her back to her home. Seeing it, Roopa's father dies out of agony. Roopa vows that she will never ever return to Rajeev as his mistress.

A terrible storm ravages the village, breaking open the dam which Rajeev had come to repair. The village is being evacuated as the dam's shutters are opening. While moving from the village with her uncle, Roopa (without veil on her face) sings the bhajan and Rajeev, who comes in search of his mistress recognizes her voice and realizes that his wife and mistress is one. In the swirling waters of the flood, Rajeev sees how shallow he has been, and saves Roopa from drowning. He, asks for Roopa's forgiveness and accepts Roopa as his wife.

== Cast ==
- Shashi Kapoor as Rajeev, a civil engineer
- Zeenat Aman as Rupa, a village girl
  - Padmini Kolhapure as Young Rupa
- Kanhaiyalal as Pandit Shyam Sunder, village priest
- A. K. Hangal as Bansi, Rupa's uncle
- Hari Shivdasani as Chief Engineer
- David Abraham Cheulkar as Bade Babu
- Leela Chitnis as Bade Babu's wife
- Vishwa Mehra as Jai Singh
- Sheetal as Champa
- Monika as Rupa's friend
- Subroto Mahapatra as Shastry, Rupa's prospective father-in-law
- Javed Khan as Shastry's son
- Tun Tun as Fat Lady

== Production ==
In her book Raj Kapoor Speaks, Ritu Nanda reveals that Lata Mangeshkar was the inspiration behind the film and that he wanted to cast her in the movie; "I visualised the story of a man falling for a woman with an ordinary face but a golden voice and wanted to cast Lata Mangeshkar in the role, the book quotes Raj Kapoor as saying." Before Zeenat Aman was cast in the role, Hema Malini, Dimple Kapadia, Vidya Sinha were offered the role, but they refused because of sensual content and body exposure in the film. Rajesh Khanna was almost offered the male lead role in the film, but Raj Kapoor was later convinced to cast Shashi Kapoor instead.

== Music ==
Satyam Shivam Sundaram

Studio album by Laxmikant–Pyarelal
- Released: 1978
- Genre: Feature film soundtrack
- Label: Saregama
- Producer: Laxmikant–Pyarelal

Laxmikant–Pyarelal chronology
Badalte Rishtey (1978)	Satyam Shivam Sundaram (1978)	Phool Khile Hain Gulshan Gulshan (1978)

Laxmikant–Pyarelal's music won the Filmfare Best Music Director Award. Lata Mangeshkar lends her voice to the main theme song "Satyam Shivam Sundaram", which was among the chart-toppers of the year, and remains a chartbuster. Various recent music groups from both India and the United States, such as Thievery Corporation and Sheila Chandra, have re-done the theme song from the movie. Also, many variations of the song have been made (e.g. the original version is considered, in Indian music, a Bhajan, but Lata Mangeshkar has also made a bhangra-like version, a different style). The song "Chanchal Sheetal Nirmal Komal" was the last song of the popular singer Mukesh, who died soon after recording the song. Raj Kapoor dedicated the film to him.

Mangeshkar at the time of recording the main theme song was in dispute that the initial selected Music Director was her brother Hridaynath Mangeshkar but he was replaced with Laxmikant Pyarelal overnight. She has conveyed that she came for the recording, practiced the song for a short while, sang the song in anger in one take, and left. This was one of her songs recorded in not more than 30 minutes.

- "Satyam Shivam Sundaram" was listed at #6 on Binaca Geetmala annual list 1977
- "Yashomati Maiya Se" was listed at #7 on Binaca Geetmala annual list 1978
- "Chanchal Sheetal Nirmal Komal" was listed at #24 on Binaca Geetmala annual list 1978

Song	Singers	Raga	Lyricist	Time
"Satyam Shivam Sundaram"	Lata Mangeshkar & Chorus	Darbari Kanada	Pandit Narendra Sharma	5:05
"Bhor Bhaye Panghat Pe"	Lata Mangeshkar	Bhairavi (Hindustani)	Anand Bakshi	5:30
"Woh Aurat Hai Too Mehbooba"	Lata Mangeshkar, Nitin Mukesh		Anand Bakshi	5:00
"Chanchal Sheetal Nirmal Komal"	Mukesh & Chorus		Anand Bakshi	5:50
"Saiyan Nikas Gaye"	Lata Mangeshkar, Bhupinder Singh	Shivaranjani	Vitthalbhai Patel	4:45
"Suni Jo Unke Aane Ki Aahat"	Lata Mangeshkar	Yaman (raga)	Pandit Narendra Sharma	3:20
"Satyam Shivam Sundaram"	Lata Mangeshkar		Pandit Narendra Sharma	6:15
"Yashomati Maiya Se Bole Nandlala"	Lata Mangeshkar, Manna Dey	Bilaval	Pandit Narendra Sharma	3:45
"Yashomati Maiya Se Bole Nandlala"	Lata Mangeshkar	Bhairavi (Hindustani)	Pandit Narendra Sharma	3:10
"Shree Radha Mohan Shyam Shobhan"	Lata Mangeshkar, Manna Dey & chorus		Pandit Narendra Sharma	2:50
"Shri Radhamohan"	Manna Dey		Pandit Narendra Sharma	2:55

== Awards ==
26th Filmfare Awards
Won

- Best Music Director – Laxmikant–Pyarelal
- Best Cinematography – Radhu Karmakar

Nominated

- Best Director – Raj Kapoor
- Best Actress – Zeenat Aman
- Best Lyricist – Pandit Narendra Sharma for "Satyam Shivam Sundaram"
- Best Male Playback Singer – Mukesh for "Chanchal Sheetal" (posthumous)

== Reception ==
Heavily publicized before release, Satyam Shivam Sundaram ran for 29 weeks in Kolkata's Metro Cinema thus emerging a blockbuster in West Bengal and a hit elsewhere.

== Controversy ==
The film's exhibition, which contains nudity, was challenged at the time of its release by a man named Laxman from Himachal Pradesh on obscenity grounds and for also for juxtaposing a religious title with such content. A prosecution under section 292 of the Indian Penal Code was lodged against director Raj Kapoor for promoting "obscenity" through the film. The local magistrate court took cognisance and summons/notice was issued to Kapoor. The notice was challenged by Kapoor before the Himachal Pradesh High Court but the High Court did not interfere, Kapoor then approached the Supreme Court which found merit in Kapoor's contention and quashed the prosecution at the threshold. It noted that once a certificate under section 5(a) of the Cinematograph Act has been granted, the filmmaker is covered by protection under section 79 of the Indian Penal Code which states, "Nothing is an offence which is done by any person who is justified by law, or who because of a mistake of fact and not because of a mistake of law in good faith, believes himself to be justified by law, in doing it." Justice Iyer in the concluding paragraph has made following observation highlighting the responsibility of the Censor Board, "And the Board, alive to its public duty, shall not play to the gallery; nor shall it restrain aesthetic expression and progressive art through obsolete norms and grandma inhibition when the world is wheeling forward to glimpse the beauty of creation in its myriad manifestations and liberal horizons, A happy balance is to maintained."
