= Maithreem Bhajata =

Sanskrit benediction

Maithreem Bhajata मैत्रीं भजत is a hymn composed in Sanskrit by the 68th Jagadguru Shankaracharya of Moolamnaya Sarvajna Shri Kanchi Kamakoti Peetham Shri Chandrasekharendra Saraswati, renowned as the Paramacharya of Kanchi.

The song was set to a Ragamalika by composer Shri Vasant Desai.

== Historical importance ==
It was rendered at the United Nations on Oct. 23, 1966 on the occasion of the UN day, by Bharat Ratna Smt. M. S. Subbulakshmi and Dr. Radha Viswanathan, receiving a standing ovation.

== Information ==
Raaga - Sung in Ragamalika. Yaman Kalyani and Kapi.

Tala - Adi

== Lyrics ==
Sanskrit

मैत्रीं भजत अखिलहृज्जेत्रीम्
आत्मवदेव परानपि पश्यत ।
युद्धं त्यजत स्पर्धां त्यजत
त्यजत परेषु अक्रममाक्रमणम् ॥
जननी पृथिवी कामदुघाऽऽस्ते
जनको देवः सकलदयालुः ।
दाम्यत दत्त दयध्वं जनताः
श्रेयो भूयात् सकलजनानाम् ॥

Latin transliteration

maitrīṃ bhajata akhilahṛjjetrīm
ātmavadeva parānapi paśyata
yuddhaṃ tyajata spardhāṃ tyajata
tyajata pareṣu akramam ākramaṇam
jananī pṛthivī kāmadughā(ā)ste
janako devaḥ sakaladayāluḥ
dāmyata datta dayadhvaṃ janatāḥ
śreyo bhūyāt sakalajanānām

English translation

Cultivate friendship with all.
Look upon others as thyself.
Renounce war.
Forswear competition.
Give up aggression on others.
Earth our Mother is here, to fulfill our desires, just like Kamadhenu.
God is compassionate to all.
Ye people of this world!
Restraint yourself, donate, and be kind.
May all people be happy and prosperous.
