= Vishwanath Jadhav =

Indian singer (1885–1964)

Pandit Vishwanathbuwa Balwantrao Jadhav
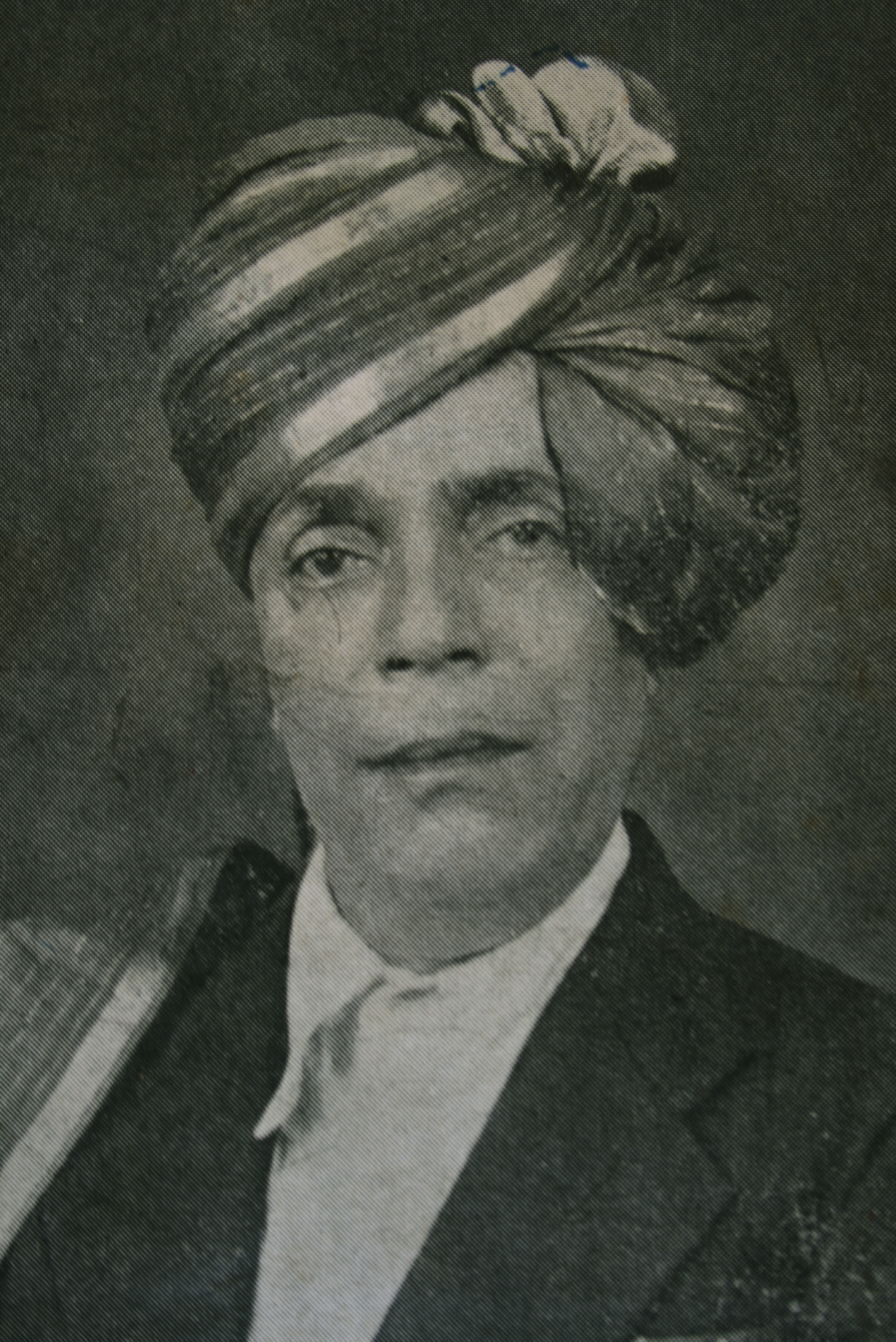
- Jadhav, c. 1940

Background information
- Born: Pandit Vishwanathbuwa Jadhav; 5 October 1885; Hupari, Kolhapur district, Bombay Presidency, British India
- Died: 1 September 1964 (aged 78) Kolhapur, Maharashtra, India
- Genre: Indian classical music
- Occupation: Classical Khayal Vocalist-Performer-Pedagogue
- Years active: 1895–1964
- Past members: Father's Name: Balwantrao Jadhav; Mother's Name: Balabai Jadhav; Sons' Names: 1) Pandit Baburao V. Jadhav; 2) Pandit Rajaram V. Jadhav; 3) Pandit Pandurang V. Jadhav
- Website: http://www.proudhgandharva.in/

Vishwanath Jadhav (5 October 1885 – 1 September 1964) was an Indian classical khyal singer and a disciple of Abdul Karim Khan, the founder of Kirana gharana (singing style).

== Training ==
He learned under Abdul Karim from 1910 until the latter's death in 1937. He also took lessons from 1906 to 1910 Nissar Hussain Khan of Gwalior gharana.

== Career ==
Jadhav was appointed a court musician of the former princely state of Kolhapur by Chhatrapati Shahu Maharaj in 1920s. He had also been invited to perform on various occasions by Maharaja Krishna Raja Wodaiyar IV, the Maharaja of Mysore State. In 1936, he was also bestowed the title of "Proudh Gandharva" by Wodaiyar. He used to also perform at the royal functions of Sangli State. Being friends with Dinanath Mangeshkar, he also taught the veteran Bollywood singer Lata Mangeshkar in her childhood days at Sangli.

Jadhav composed music for films in the early talkie era. He was the music composer of the 1937 film Gangavataran. The film was written and directed by Dadasaheb Phalke, who is known as the "father of Indian cinema". It was the first sound film and the last film to be directed by Phalke. In 1938, he also composed music for the mythological film Dhurva Kumar based on Dhruva's story. The film starred actors Kumar Prabhakar and Raja Paranjape.

On 4 April 1952, Pandit Vishwanathbuwa was honoured by the first President of India, Dr. Rajendra Prasad, at the golden jubilee celebrations of the Gandharva Mahavidyalaya at Delhi.

== Legacy ==
He has three sons, who are also classical singers of repute. The Pandit Vishwanathbuwa Jadhav Memorial Committee (PVJMC) which promotes Hindustani music. In May 2012, the committee submitted a collection of about 500 notations of various bandishes that Pandit Jadhavbuwa preserved of his learning from his gurus Ustad Nissar Hussein Khan and Ustad Abdul Karim Khan, to a Pune-based group the "Pune Bharat Gayan Samaj" (PBGS).

=== Discography ===
Sr. No.	Name of Artist	Raga	Tal	Cheez	Duration
1	Pandit V.B. Jadhav (supported by his sons)	Bhairav Bahar	Vilambit- Ektal, Drut-Trital	"Ye meri basant ki mubaraki le hun pyare", "Dalriya jhuk raho hare hare"	66 Min. 58 Sec.
2	Pandit V.B. Jadhav (supported by his sons)	Bhairavi (Thumri)		"Sakhi jamuna ke tir"	17 Min. 02 Sec.
3	Pandit V.B. Jadhav (supported by his sons)	Mishra Kafi		"Ugich ka kanta"	16 Min. 31 Sec.
