= Dadasaheb Phalke =

Indian film producer, director and screenwriter (1870–1944)

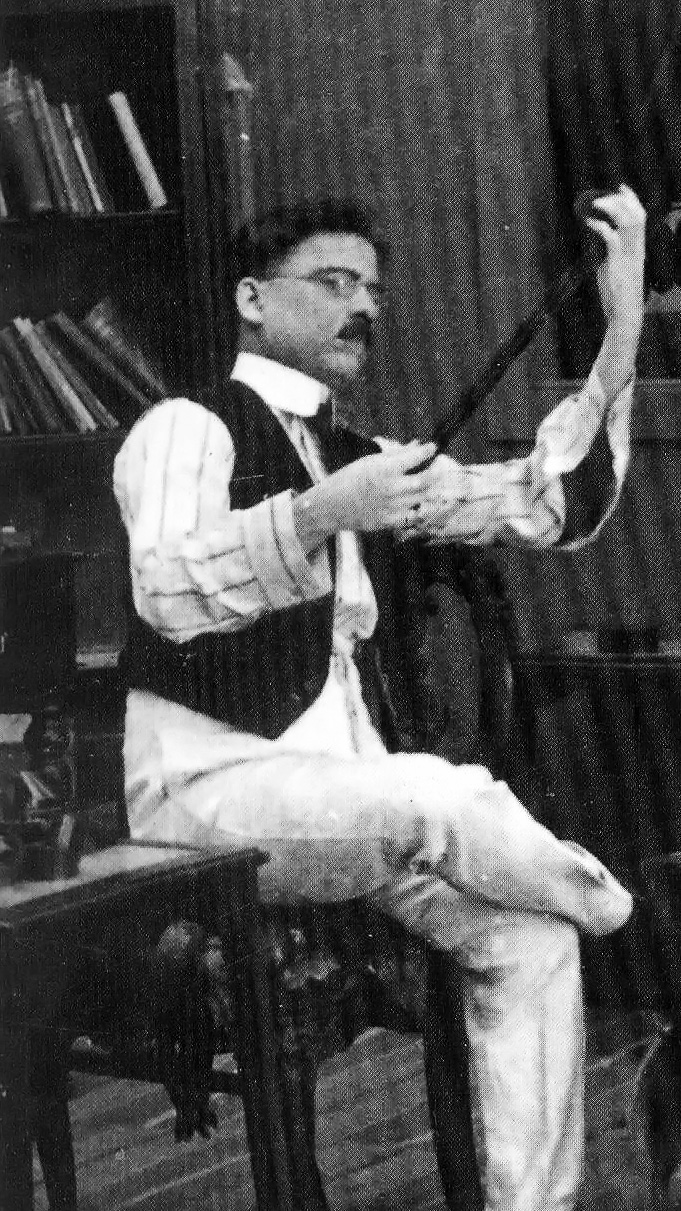
- Phalke seated on a chair with a small roll of film in his hands
- Born: Dhundiraj Govind Phalke; 30 April 1870; Trimbak, Bombay Presidency, British India
- Died: 16 February 1944 (aged 73); Nashik, Bombay Presidency, British India
- Education: Sir J. J. School of Art; Maharaja Sayajirao University of Baroda
- Occupations: Film director; producer; screenwriter; editor; art director; costume designer; make-up artist
- Years active: 1912–1944
- Spouses: Kathilakam Bai (m. 1885; died 1900); Saraswatibai Phalke (m. 1902–1944)

Dhundiraj Govind Phalke (Note: Marathi: धुंडिराज गोविंद फाळके, Marathi pronunciation: [d̪ʱuɳɖiɾaːd͡ʑ goʋind̪(ə) pʰaːɭ̆ke]; 30 April 1870 – 16 February 1944), popularly known as Dadasaheb Phalke, was an Indian producer, director and screenwriter, widely regarded as "the Father of Indian cinema".

Phalke’s debut film, Raja Harishchandra (1913), was the first Indian motion picture and is recognised as India's first full-length Indian historical feature film on Satyavadi Raja Harishchandra. The movie’s success marked the beginning of Indian cinema and inspired the growth of the film industry in the country.

Over his career spanning nearly two decades, Phalke made 94 feature-length films and 27 short films between 1913 and 1937. His most notable works include Mohini Bhasmasur (1913), Satyavan Savitri (1914), Lanka Dahan (1917), Shri Krishna Janma (1918), and Kaliya Mardan (1919). He was known for his creativity, technical innovation and ability to adapt Indian historical stories for the screen, often handling multiple departments such as editing, set design and makeup himself.

In recognition of his contributions to Indian cinema, the Government of India instituted the Dadasaheb Phalke Award in his honour. It remains the highest award in Indian cinema, presented annually as part of the National Film Awards to honour lifetime achievement in filmmaking.

== Early life and education ==
Dhundiraj Phalke was born on 30 April 1870 at Trimbak, Bombay Presidency into a Marathi-speaking Chitpavan Brahmin family. His father, Govind Sadashiv Phalke alias Dajishastri, was a Sanskrit scholar and worked as a Hindu priest conducting religious ceremonies and his mother, Dwarkabai, was a housewife. The couple had seven children, three sons and four daughters. Shivrampant, the eldest, was twelve years older than Phalke and worked in Baroda. He briefly worked as the Dewan (Chief Administrator) of the princely state of Jawhar and died in 1921, at the age of 63. Phalke's second brother Raghunathrao, also worked as a priest and died at a young age of 21. Dajishastri taught Phalke to conduct religious rituals like yajna and dispensing of medicines. When he was appointed as a professor of Sanskrit in the Wilson College, Bombay, the family shifted its base to Bombay. Phalke completed his primary education in Trimbakeshwar and matriculation was done in Bombay.

Phalke joined the Sir J. J. School of Art, Bombay in 1885 and completed a one-year course in drawing. At the beginning of 1886, he accompanied his elder brother, Shivrampant, to Baroda where he married a girl from Marathe family. Later, he joined Kala Bhavan, the Faculty of Fine Arts, at the Maharaja Sayajirao University of Baroda and completed a course in Oil painting and Watercolor painting in 1890. He also achieved proficiency in architecture and modelling. In the same year, Phalke bought a film camera and started experimenting with photography, processing, and printing. He was awarded a gold medal for creating a model of an ideal theatre at the 1892 Industrial Exhibition of Ahmedabad. While his work was much appreciated, one of his fans presented him a "costly" camera, used for still photography. In 1891, Phalke did a six-months course to learn the techniques of preparing half-tone blocks, photo-lithio, and three-colour ceramic photography. Principal Gajjar of Kala Bhavan sent Phalke to Ratlam to learn three-colour blockmaking, photolitho transfers, colotype and darkroom printing techniques under the guidance of Babulal Varuvalkar.

== Career ==
=== 1893–1911: Early career ===
In 1893, Gajjar allowed Phalke to use the photo studio and laboratory of Kala Bhavan where he started his work under the name of "Shri Phalke's Engraving and Photo Printing". Despite his proficiency in various skills, he did not have a stable family life and had difficulties in making a living. Thus, in 1895, he decided to become a professional photographer and relocated to Godhra for doing business. He was given free studio space to start his still photo studio by the prominent Desai family for whom he also shot their family photo albums. He lost his wife and a child in the 1900 plague epidemic and decided to move to a different city. Phalke returned to Baroda and started photography business. It did not run well because of the myth spread across the city that the camera sucks up the energy from a person's body which leads to their death. He faced similar resistance from the Prince of Baroda who refused to take photographs with the assumptions that it would shorten his life. Though, the Prince was later convinced by Phalke who went on to advocate the benefits of photography in his court, it did not help Phalke's business. He started the business of painting the stage curtains for the drama companies. This got him some basic training in drama production and fetched him a few minor roles in the plays.

Phalke learned magic tricks from a German magician who was on a tour in Baroda that time. This helped him use trick photography in his filmmaking. At the end of 1901, Phalke began to hold the public performances of magic using professional name of Professor Kelpha with letters of his last name in reverse order. In 1902, Phalke remarried to Girija Karandikar, niece of proprietor of Kirloskar Natak Mandali. Girija was renamed as Saraswati after the marriage. In 1903, he got a job as a photographer and draftsman at the Archaeological Survey of India. However, not satisfied with the job, Phalke resigned in 1906 and set up a printing press at Lonavala under the name of "Phalke Engraving and Printing Works" with R. G. Bhandarkar as a partner.

The press majorly worked for making photo-litho transfers for Ravi Verma Press, owned by painter Raja Ravi Varma. Later, it also started the work of halftone blockmaking and printing and tri-colour printing. With the growing business, the press was shifted to Dadar, Bombay. Later in 1908, Purushottam Mavji replaced Bhandarkar as a partner and the press was renamed as "Laxmi Art Printing Works". Phalke went to Germany in 1909 to buy the necessary colour printing machinery. (Note: According to the prevalent society mores, Phalke had to undergo a purification ceremony, having returned from a foreign country.) Though the printing business grew exponentially, the partners had increasing differences about the running of the press. Soon, Phalke decided to abandon the partnership, without availing any monetary benefits.

=== 1911–1917: Filmmaking struggle, debut, and success ===
==== Initial obstacles and London visit ====
After quitting "Laxmi Art Printing Works", Phalke received multiple offers from various financiers to start another printing press but he did not accept any offers. On 14 April 1911, Phalke with his elder son Bhalchandra went to see a film, Amazing Animals, at the America India Picture Palace, Girgaon, Bombay. Surprised at seeing animals on the screen, Bhalchandra informed his mother, Saraswatibai, about his experience earlier that day. None of the family members believed them, so Phalke took his family to see the film the next day. As it was Easter, the theatre screened a film about Jesus, The Life of Christ (1906) by the French director Alice Guy-Blaché instead. While watching Jesus on the screen, Phalke envisioned Hindu deities Rama and Krishna instead and decided to start in the business of "moving pictures".

For the next one year, Phalke started collecting various film related material like catalogues, books, and movie making equipment from Europe. He bought a small film camera and reels and started showing movies at night, by focusing candle light on a lens and projecting the pictures on the wall. He watched movies every evening for four to five hours and was deprived of sleep. This put strain on his eyes and he developed cataract in both eyes. He continued working against the advice of taking rest and lost his sight completely. Ophthalmologist Dr. Prabhakar treated Phalke with the aid of three or four pairs of spectacles which helped him restore the eyesight. Phalke wished to go to London to get technical knowledge of filmmaking but had difficulties getting finances for his trip. With the help of Yashwantrao Nadkarni and Abasaheb Chitnis, he secured a sum of ten thousands by mortgaging his insurance policies worth twelve thousands. On 1 February 1912, he boarded a ship for London.

At London, Phalke saw a nameboard of "Bioscope Cine-Weekly" near Piccadilly Circus. He was a subscriber of the weekly in India. He met its editor, Mr. Cabourn, and explained the purpose of his visit. Cabourn advised Phalke against the idea of filmmaking in India based on the unsuccessful attempts in England and suggested that the Indian climate might not be suitable as well. However, he was impressed with Phalke's dedication and introduced him to the film director, producer, and screenwriter Cecil Hepworth of Walton Studios. Hepworth allowed Phalke to visit all the departments of the studio and their workings along with the demonstration of filming. At the advice of Cabourn and Hepworth, he bought Williamson camera for fifty pounds and placed an order for Kodak raw film and a perforator. Phalke stayed in London for two months and returned to India on 1 April 1912. He founded the "Phalke Films Company" on the same day.

==== Film debut with Raja Harishchandra ====
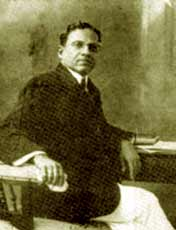
Dadasaheb Phalke

After coming back from London, Phalke started looking for a spacious place for shooting the films. Soon, the family shifted from Ismail Building, Charni Road to Mathura Bhavan Bungalow, Dadar. He constructed a small glass room at the compound of the bungalow and prepared a dark room and arrangements for processing the film. Imported filmmaking equipment reached Bombay in May 1912 and Phalke set it up within four days with the help of sketch provided. He also taught his family to perforate and develop the film. To test the working of camera and projector, Phalke filmed the boys and girls in the surroundings to the satisfactory results. To demonstrate the filmmaking techniques and get financier for the feature film, Phalke decided to make a short film. He planted some peas in a pot and placed a camera in front of it. He shot one frame a day for over a month producing a film just over one minute, of the seed growing, sprouting, and changing into a climber. The short film titled Ankurachi Wadh (Growth of a Pea Plant) and showed selective individuals. Some of them, including Yashwantrao Nadkarni and Narayanrao Devhare, offered Phalke a loan.

Phalke decided to make a film based on the legends of Harishchandra and wrote the script for it. He published advertisements in various newspapers like Induprakash calling for the cast and crew required for the film. As no women were available to play female leads, male actors performed the female roles. Dattatraya Damodar Dabke played the lead role of King Harishchandra and Anna Salunke as Queen Taramati. Phalke's elder son Bhalchandra was assigned the role, Rohidas, son of Harishchandra and Taramati. Phalke was in-charge of the scriptment, direction, production design, make-up, editing, and film processing and Trymbak B. Telang handled the camera. The filming was completed in six months and 27 days producing a film of 3,700 feet (1,100 m), about four reels.

The film premiered at the Olympia Theatre, Bombay on 21 April 1913, and had its theatrical release on Saturday, 3 May 1913 at the Coronation Cinema, Girgaon, Bombay. It was a commercial success and laid the foundation for the film industry in the country. The film is often considered the first full-length Indian feature film with its status debated with historians considering Dadasaheb Torne's silent film Shree Pundalik, released on 18 May 1912, the maiden Indian film. The Government of India recognises Raja Harischandra as the first Indian feature film.

After the success of Raja Harishchandra, Phalke relocated to Nashik. For his next film, he selected the mythological love story of Nala, a king of Nishadha Kingdom, and Damayanti, a princess of the Vidarbha Kingdom. In spite of completing the pre-production, the filming could not start so he started working on Mohini Bhasmasur, based on a mythological story of Mohini, female avatar of the Hindu god Vishnu, and Bhasmasura, an asura (demon). During the same time, a travelling drama company, Chittakarshak Natak Company, visited Nashik. Phalke requested its proprietor, Raghunathrao Gokhle, to allow two of their actresses to act in the film. Durgabai Kamat was cast as Parvati and her daughter Kamlabai Gokhale as Mohini and became first women to act in the Indian cinema. The film was 3,264 feet (995 m) long and was released on 2 January 1914 at the Olympia Theatre, Bombay. A short comedy film Pithache Panje (Paws of Flour) was released as a "side attraction" with the film. Phalke made his third film Satyavan Savitri based on the legends of Satyavan and Savitri. The film was 3,680 feet (1,120 m) long and was screened on 6 June 1914. Both the films were commercially successful like Raja Harishchandra.

==== Second London visit, debt, and success with Lanka Dahan ====
With the success of three films, Phalke was able to repay all his debts. There was huge demand for the film copies from various theatre managers in the country. Considering the tremendous response to the films, he decided to buy electronic machinery worth around ₹30,000 and left for London on 1 August 1914, taking with him his three films. Mr. Kepburn of "Bioscope Cine-Weekly", who had helped Phalke during his first London visit, arranged some screenings of the films in London. The films were praised for their technical aspects. Various producers including Cecil Hepworth of Walton Studios requested Phalke to produce films in England. Hepworth placed an offer before Phalke to produce Indian films in England, bringing cast and crew from India whose expenses on travel, lodging and boarding, and salary would be paid by Hepworth. Phalke was offered a monthly salary of 300 pounds along with 20% of the profits. Phalke declined the offer and explained Hepworth that he would continue making films in India. Warner Brothers also offered to buy 200 film copies to which Phalke agreed. However, before the official agreements were to be signed, Phalke had to come back to India after the news about the worrisome condition of his studio.

On returning to India, Phalke noticed that the financial condition had worsened due to ongoing World War I. His investor had stopped advancing the capital and asked to shut down the studio. He approached Yashwantrao Nadkarni and Abasaheb Chitnis for the loan to bring the equipment bought in London. They offered to pay half of the amount on short term basic. With the ongoing World War, Phalke also faced the scarcity of the raw films and decided to make a few short films. He received a loan on the security of studio and started working on Raja Shreeyal. Though filming started, it could not be completed due to various reasons. To get capital for his next film, Phalke approached the leaders of the Swadeshi movement without any luck. He also published an advertisement in the newspapers and distributed handbills, appealing for the help assuring the repayment with interest. However, only three people responded to the advertisement. One of them published a letter in the newspaper, Dainik Sandesh, appealing to the leaders of the Indian Home Rule movement who wanted Phalke to join the movement before any loan could be granted. Indian nationalist Bal Gangadhar Tilak tried helping Phalke through Paisa Fund Glass Works but could not succeed. During 1916, Phalke undertook a tour to raise the capital. He screened his films at the princely states of Aundh, Gwalior, Indore, Jamkhandi, and Miraj. The King of Aundh granted ₹1,000 and the Princess of Indore provided a loan of ₹5,000 and ₹1,500 as a payment of his shows.

While relocating from Bombay to Nashik, the negative film of Raja Harishchandra was lost, so Phalke filmed it again with "almost the same script, cast and all other things" and released it as Satyavadi Raja Harishchandra, a 2,944 feet (897 m) long film which was screened on 3 April 1917 at Aryan Cinema, Poona. He also made a documentary "How Movies Are Made" to demonstrate the filmmaking process to the financiers but it did not help. Phalke was invited for the session of the "Bombay Provincial Congress Parishad" held at Nashik in May 1917 where Lokmanya Tilak made an appeal to help him and also visited his studio at the request of G. S. Khaparde.

The appeal made by Tilak had desired effect and Phalke could collect sufficient capital to start a new film, Lanka Dahan. The film depicted the episode of the burning of Lanka in the Ramayana and was 3,000 feet (910 m) long, about three reels. It was screened on 17 September 1917 at the Aryan Cinema, Poona. Anna Salunke played the male as well as the female character of Rama and his wife Sita. Thus, credited with playing the first dual role in Indian cinema. When the film was screened at the West End Cinema, Bombay, the shows were held from 7 A.M. to 3 A.M. next morning and it collected ₹32,000 in ten days. According to film historian Amrit Gangar, the coins collected from the ticket counters were transported in gunny bags on bullock carts. The film was commercially successful and Phalke could repay all of his debts with its earnings.

=== 1918–1922: Partnership and retirement ===
==== Hindustan Cinema Films Company ====
After the success of Lanka Dahan, Phalke was approached by various businessmen for the partnership. Bal Gangadhar Tilak, Ratanji Tata, and Sheth Manmohandas Ramji collected the capital and approached Phalke to convert the "Phalke Films Company" into a limited company, valued at ₹300,000. Along with the additional investment of ₹150,000, it was decided that in the proposed company, Phalke would have shares worth ₹100,000 and 75% share of the profit and remaining would be distributed among other shareholders. However, the scheme could not be finalised over one of the clauses of the partnership deed. Phalke also declined the ₹100,000 offer made by actress Fatma Begum. Among all the received offers, Phalke accepted the proposal of five Bombay-based textile industrialists which included Waman Shreedhar Apte, Laxman Balwant Phatak, Mayashankar Bhatt, Madhavji Jesingh, and Gokuldas Damodar. On 1 January 1918, the "Phalke Films Company" was converted into the "Hindustan Cinema Films Company" where Apte was appointed as managing partner, Phalke as working partner and others as financial partners.

The debut film for the newly formed company was Shri Krishna Janma where Phalke's six-year-old daughter Mandakini played the lead role of Krishna. The film was 5,500 feet (1,700 m) long, about six reels and was screened on 24 August 1918 at the Majestic Cinema, Bombay. It was commercially successful and collected ₹300,000. Phalke's next film Kaliya Mardan depicted the episode of killing of poisonous snake, Kaliya, by Krishna. The film was released on 3 May 1919 at the Majestic Cinema, Bombay. It was commercially successful where it ran for ten months and was 6,000 feet (1,800 m) long, about six reels.

==== Retirement ====
Though both the films made by the "Hindustan Cinema Films Company" were commercially successful, the partners had increasing differences. Phalke did not appreciate their interference in film production and partners had concerns over the expenditure incurred and time spent by Phalke to get desired results. Phalke decided to leave the company but his advocate brought to attention the clauses from his agreement with the "Hindustan Cinema Films Company". The agreement had a span of 15 years and if Phalke decided to leave the company, he would not be given his share of profit of ₹150,000 and would have to pay ₹50,000 to the company. After unsuccessful attempts to resolve the differences, the partners approached Phalke's colleagues to take over his responsibilities, in case of his exit. All of them had been associated with Phalke since Raja Harishchandra (1913) and were trained by Phalke to handle various departments of filmmaking. With their consent, the partners signed the necessary agreements with Mama Shinde, Anna Salunke, Gajanan Sane, Trymbak B. Telang, Dattatreya Telang, and Nath Telang. With increasing dissensions developed, Phalke decided to leave the company and departed with his family for Kashi. He announced his retirement and expressed his views in an article published in Navyug.

==== Playwriting with Rangbhoomi ====
During his stay at Kashi, Phalke saw several Hindi plays by Kirloskar Natak Mandali, a travelling drama company. The professional associated with the company like Master Manhar Barve, his father Ganpatrao Barve, and its proprietor Shankar Bapuji Mujumdar and novelist Narayan Hari Apte were friends with Phalke. They had regular discussions about various aspects of drama, cinema, music, and literature. During one such meeting, Phalke expressed his desire to write a play. He completed writing a Marathi language play Rangbhoomi in about two and a half months. It was a satire on the then-contemporary theatre and stage conditions. Phalke also read out the play to Bal Gangadhar Tilak and G. S. Khaparde who were attending the All India Congress Committee's session held at Kashi. Both were very appreciative of the play. Phalke also organised the rehearsals of the play at the Aryan Cinema, Poona for almost a year.

Various professional drama companies approached Phalke to stage Rangbhoomi, but he had it staged at the Baliwala Theater, Bombay in 1922. It was a seven-act play, so Phalke decided to split it into two parts; four acts staged at one night and the remaining three on the next night. The performances were held in only three cities, Bombay, Poona, and Nashik. Made with the budget of ₹75,000, the play had very lukewarm response and was rejected for being "self-indulgent".

=== 1922–1937: Comeback and popularity decline ===
==== Reconciliation with Hindustan Cinema Films Company ====
Various people tried convincing Phalke to rejoin the film industry. He declined the offer made by filmmaker Jamshedji Framji Madan to produce films under his film company Madan Theatre. Achyut Kolhatkar, editor of Marathi newspaper Sandesh, wrote to Phalke requesting to rethink his decision. Phalke replied: "I am dead so far as the cinema industry is concerned and have no inclination to go back to it". Kolhatkar published Phalke's letter under the heading, "Dadasaheb Phalke is Dead". Several readers wrote to Sandesh requesting Phalke to make a comeback. All these letters were published in Sandesh and Kolhatkar sent all the issues of the newspaper to Phalke at Kashi. Reading these letters, Phalke decided to come back to Nashik.

After Phalke left the Hindustan Cinema Films Company, its financial condition worsened with the shutting down of the company's Poona branch, Bharat Film Company. On hearing the news of Phalke's return to Nashik, the managing partner of the company, Waman Apte, with the help of the proprietor of Aryan Cinema, Bapusaheb Pathak, invited Phalke to join back the company as a Production Chief and Technical Advisor. Phalke readily agreed to the request and joined as an employee of the company on the monthly salary of ₹1,000.

The first film Phalke directed after joining the Hindustan Cinema Films Company was Sant Namdeo which was released on 28 October 1922. Thereafter, he directed films for the company till 1929. However, none of these films achieved comparable success with his earlier films. Phalke continued to have differences with the company owners and he left it twice until 1929. When he returned for the first time, he was offered the monthly salary of ₹500. For the second time, it was reduced to ₹250. After rest four partners left the company, its responsibility fell on the shoulders of Waman Apte. Not satisfied with the restrictions imposed by the company, Phalke tried raising the capital for the next film by himself. As Apte did not allow Phalke to raise the capital while still in the service of the company, Phalke resigned from the job.

==== Phalke Diamond Company and Setubandhan ====
Phalke decided to form a new company, "Phalke Diamond Company", and approached Mayashankar Bhatt, a former partner of the Hindustan Cinema Films Company. Bhatt agreed to provide the capital of ₹50,000 but with the condition that the film should be completed within the stipulated budget. Phalke accepted the proposal and started working on Setubandhan. The outdoor shooting was completed at Hampi, Chennai (then Madras), Ratnagiri. However, the capital was exhausted before the film was complete. Bhatt refused to do any more investment. Phalke tried raising more capital with no success. Thus, the filming had to be stopped for the next one year.

When Waman Apte of the Hindustan Cinema Films Company saw the sets erected for the film, he was impressed and agreed to help Phalke. He proposed the merger of the Phalke Diamond Company with his company. Phalke joined the company again as a partner and shifted the shooting at Imperial Film Studio of Bombay under the banner of the Hindustan Cinema Films Company. Setubandhan took two years to complete. As fifteen-year agreement for the Hindustan Cinema Films Company was completed, Apte decided to dissolve the company. By that time, the sound films had screened in India with the release on Alam Ara – the first sound film in the Indian cinema, on 14 March 1931. Being a silent film, Setubandhan faced difficulties in getting theatres with the competition from sound films. It was released in 1932. Ardeshir Irani, the director of Alam Ara, suggested Phalke to add sound to Setubandhan. Phalke agreed and dubbed the film in Hindi at Irani's studio with the cost of ₹40,000. It was re-released in 1934 but was not commercially successful.

==== Gangavataran: Last film and only talkie ====
In December 1934, the Maharaja of the princely state of Kolhapur, Rajaram III, invited Phalke to produce a sound film for his film company "Kolhapur Cinetone". Phalke declined the invitation but was again invited by the Maharaja. He accepted the invitation and was offered ₹1,500 for writing the story and script and ₹450 as his monthly expenses. Novelist Narayan Hari Apte helped Phalke for writing the script and dialogue. Vishwanath Jadhav composed the music for film and Phalke wrote the lyrics. The film, Gangavataran, was completed in two years at the cost of ₹250,000. It was released on 6 August 1937 at the Royal Opera House, Bombay. Gangavataran was the only sound film directed by Phalke. He retired from the films due to his old age.

=== 1938–1944: Last days ===
The times changed and Phalke fell victim to the emerging technology of sound film. Unable to cope with the talkies, the man who had fathered the Indian film industry became obsolete. His last silent film Setubandhan was released in 1932 and later released with dubbing. During 1936–1938, he produced his last film, Gangavataran (1937), which was the only talking movie directed by Phalke, before retiring to Nashik, where he died on 16 February 1944.

== Selected filmography ==
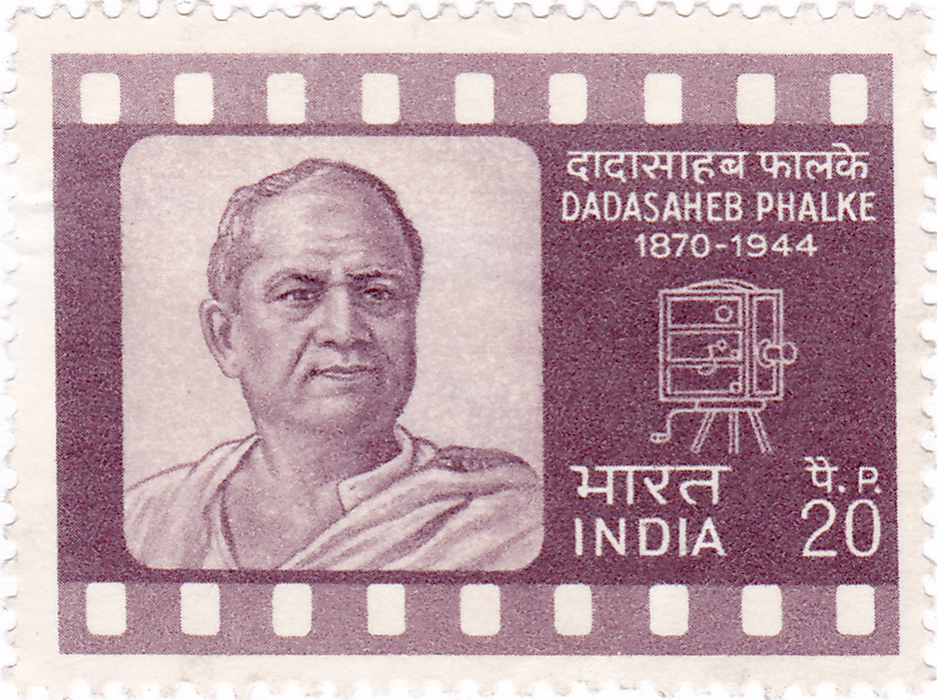
Phalke on a 1971 stamp of India

- Ankurachi Wadh (1912)
- Raja Harishchandra (1913)
- Mohini Bhasmasur (1913)
- Satyavan Savitri (1914)
- Lanka Dahan (1917)
- Shri Krishna Janma (1918)
- Kaliya Mardan (1919)
- Buddhadev (1923)
- Setu Bandhan (1932)
- Gangavataran (1937)

== Legacy ==
The Dadasaheb Phalke Award, for lifetime contribution to cinema, was instituted in his honour by the Government of India in 1969. The award is one of the most prestigious awards in Indian cinema and is the highest official recognition for film personalities in the country. A postage stamp bearing his likeness was released by India Post to honour him in 1971. An honorary award from the Dadasaheb Phalke Academy Mumbai was introduced in the year 2001, for lifetime achievement in Indian cinema.

== In popular culture ==
In 2009, the Marathi film Harishchandrachi Factory, which was directed by theatre veteran Paresh Mokashi and depicts Dadasaheb Phalke's struggle in making Raja Harishchandra in 1913. It was also selected as India's official entry to the Academy Awards in the Best Foreign Language Film category. On 30 April 2018, Google honoured the Indian producer for the 148th year of his birth. The Google Doodle was featured in Canada, India, Australia, and New Zealand.

== Bibliography ==
- Gulzar; Nihalani, Govind; Chatterjee, Saibal, eds. (2003). Encyclopaedia of Hindi Cinema. Popular Prakashan. ISBN 978-81-7991-066-5.
- Kosambi, Meera (2017) [2014]. Gender, Culture, and Performance: Marathi Theatre and Cinema before Independence. Taylor & Francis. ISBN 978-1-351-56590-5.
- Gokulsing, K. Moti; Dissanayake, Wimal (2013). Routledge Handbook of Indian Cinemas. Routledge. ISBN 978-1-136-77284-9.
- Mujawar, Isak (1969). Maharashtra: Birthplace of Indian Film Industry (PDF). Maharashtra Information Centre. Archived from the original (PDF) on 5 August 2016.
- Pinney, Christopher (2013). Camera Indica: The Social Life of Indian Photographs. Reaktion Books. ISBN 978-1-78023-152-5.
- Rajadhyaksha, Ashish; Willemen, Paul, eds. (1998) [1994]. Encyclopaedia of Indian Cinema (PDF). Oxford University Press. ISBN 978-0-19-563579-9.
- Watve, Bapu (2012) [2004]. Dadasaheb Phalke, The Father of Indian Cinema. Translated by Virkar, S. A. National Book Trust. ISBN 978-81-237-4319-6.
