= Filmi devotional songs =

Filmi devotional songs (or filmi bhajans) are devotional songs from Hindi movies, or Hindi songs composed to be sung using the melody in a popular filmi song.

While most of these songs relate to Hinduism, often many of the devotional songs are general, and can prove acceptable to followers of other faiths as well.

== Selected popular filmi bhajans ==
Even though the movies are considered to be decadent, some of the songs are finely crafted spiritual hymns. Here are some examples. Only a small part of the song is given here.

Man Tadapat Hari Darshan Ko Aaj (film Baiju Bawra, 1952) by Naushad and Shakeel Badayuni

मन तड़पत हरि दरशन को आज,

मोरे तुम बिन बिगड़े सकल काज
आ, बिनती करत हूँ, रखियो लाज,

तुम्हरे द्वार का मैं हूँ जोगी,

हमरी ओर नज़र कब होगी

सुन मोरे व्याकुल मन का बाज

Translation:

Lord! I am dying for your glimpse, without your blessing I cannot achieve anything.
I urge you to preserve my honor.
I am a beggar standing at your door, when will you look at me?
Listen to my heart in agony.

(Note that Hinduism is often a very visual faith. A glimpse of the image of the lord can represent spiritual fulfillment to one. Also note that the term "Hari" specifically means Lord Vishnu, in Sikh tradition, the term is used for the Nirguna God in general.)

Tu Pyar Ka Sagar Hai (film - Seema, 1955) This song is dedicated to Goddess Amba, as shown in the film. Music by Shankar–Jaikishan, lyrics by Shailendra.

तू प्यार का सागर है
तेरी इक बूँद के प्यासे हम
लौटा जो दिया तुमने, चले जायेंगे जहाँ से हम
तू प्यार का सागर है ...

घायल मन का, पागल पंछी उड़ने को बेक़रार
पंख हैं कोमल, आँख है धुँधली, जाना है सागर पार
जाना है सागर पार
अब तू हि इसे समझा, राह भूले थे कहान से हम...

Translation: You are an ocean of Love,
while we are thirsty of a drop of water.
If you will send us back without it,
we will leave this mortal world.

Ae Malik Tere Bande Ham (film Do Aankhen Barah Haath, 1957) by Vasant Desai and Bharat Vyas

ऐ मालिक तेरे बंदे हम, ऐसे हो हमारे करम
नेकी पर चलें, और बदी से टलें
ताकि हंसते हुये निकले दम

जब ज़ुल्मों का हो सामना, तब तू ही हमें थामना

Translation:

Lord! I am your servant. May I
do good things and avoid bad ones,
so that I will be happy when I take my last breath.

Hold me Lord, when I am oppressed.

(Here the term "Malik" can apply to the God of several faiths.)

Jyot Se Jyot Jagaate Chalo (film Sant Gyaneshwar, 1964), music by Laxmikant–Pyarelal, lyrics by Bharat Vyas

ज्योत से ज्योत जगाते चलो, प्रेम की गंगा बहाते चलो
राह में आए जो दीन दुखी, सबको गले से लगाते चलो
जिसका न कोई संगी साथी ईश्वर है रखवाला
जो निर्धन है जो निर्बल है वह है प्रभू का प्यारा
प्यार के मोती लुटाते चलो, ...

Translation:

From one light, light another one, let a river of love flow.
embrace all those in misery that you find along the way.
God helps those who have no friends
God loves those who are poor or weak
distribute your love like pearls

(In India a light is sacred and is a symbol of life and enlightenment.)

Tumhi Ho Mata, Pita Tumhi Ho (film Main Chup Rahungi, 1962) by Rajendra Krishan and Chitragupta

This filmi song is based on a shloka from Vishwanatha Suprabhata:

त्वमेव माता च पिता त्वमेव त्वमेव बन्धुश्च सखा त्वमेव
त्वमेव विद्या द्रविणं त्वमेव त्वमेव सर्वं मम देवदेव

Translation:
You alone are my mother and my father,
You alone are my brother and my companion,
You alone are the Knowledge and the Wealth,
You alone are everything to me my god.

The popular Hindi song is:

तुम्ही हो माता, पिता तुम्ही हो,
तुम्ही हो बंधु सखा तुम्ही हो

तुम्ही हो साथी तुम्ही सहारे,
कोइ न अपना सिवा तुम्हारे
तुम्ही हो नैय्या तुम्ही खेवैय्या,
तुम्ही हो बंधु सखा तुम्ही हो

Translation:

You are my mother and my father,
my kin and my friend
you are my companion, and I have no one besides you
you are my boat and boatman.

Itni shakti hame dena data (film Ankush, 1986), by Abhilash

इतनी शक्ति हमें देना दाता
मन का विश्वास कमज़ोर हो न
हम चलें नेक रस्ते पे हमसे
भूल कर भी कोई भूल हो न

हर तरफ़ ज़ुल्म है, बेबसी है
सहमा सहमा-सा हर आदमी है
पाप का बोझ बढता ही जाये
जाने कैसे ये धरती थमी है
बोझ ममता का तू ये उठा ले
तेरी रचना का ये अँत हो न

Translation:

Grant us the strength, O divine giver,
That our faith never falters,
May we walk only the righteous path,
May we never make a mistake, even unknowingly.

Everywhere, oppression and helplessness prevail,
Fear grips every heart,
The weight of sin keeps growing,
How does this earth still endure?
Lift this burden of suffering, O Creator,
Let not this be the end of Your creation.

== See also ==
- Bollywood songs
- Bhajans
- Classic Bhajans
- Jai Jagdish Hare
