= Marathe =

Marathe (Saste) is an Indian Hindu surname. Notable people with the surname include:

== Real people ==
- Anant Marathe (1929–2003), Indian actor
- Deepa Marathe (born 1972), Indian cricketer
- Priya Marathe (1987–2025), Indian actress
- Shruti Marathe (born 1990), Indian actress
- Sushant Marathe (born 1985), Indian cricketer

== Fictional characters ==
- Rémy Marathe, in the 1996 novel Infinite Jest by David Foster Wallace

== See also ==
- Marathi people
- Konkani people
