= Ishwar Das Varshnei =

Ishwar Das Varshnei (died 1948) was the father of the glass industry in India.

== Early life and education ==
Shri Ishwar Das Varshnei was born in Aligarh and was the son of Lala Jagannath Prasad and grandson of Lala Gabdamal, famous cloth merchants in Sikandra Rao. Shri Ishwar Das Varshnei was the father of Glass Industry in India and was one of those to whom the establishment and successful working of blown ware, pressed ware and a many sheet glass factories in India can to be described. He was the first President of the Indian Ceramic Society. He was born at Aligarh in 1879, and after getting his earlier education at the M. A. 0. College, Aligarh, he proceeded to Japan in 1901 to study sugar technology at Koto Koyo Gakko, Tokio. But he subsequently gave up his sugar training in favour of glass industry, simply to meet the challenge of one Mr. Wagley who had written in the 'Indian People" that glass industry was impossible in India. Within the next year and a half he finished his course in glass technology as well as practical factory work in Japan and in the middle of 1904 he reached Boston, U.S.A. where after passing a preliminary examination of fitness he was allowed to study in the Massachusetts Institute of Technology becoming the first Indian to do so. He took glass technology and a mass of other subjects necessary for the success of his future career. From America he went to England and touring many parts of Europe he returned to India in the month of October, 1905.

== Career ==
In December 1907, Shri Ishwar Das Varshnei attended the session of the Indian National Congress at Surat and came in contact with Lokamanya Bal Gangadhar Tilak who was collecting a fund known as the Paisa Fund, which was to be devoted to the fostering of Indian industries and industrial training of Indians. He undertook this by starting a training school for glass on a commercial scale for the Fund in Talegaon, Maharashtra under the name of Paisa Fund Glass Works. Under the superintendence of Shri Varshnei, useful work was done in training foremen and glass blowers thereby creating room for industry expansion. He continued his mission till November 1914 after which he proceeded towards northern India and took on lease a sick unit in the name of Upper India Glass works, Ambala and started another greenfield project in the small town of Bahjoi in Uttar Pradesh by the name of United Provinces glass Works.

In 1918 his eldest son Shri Bishamber Dayal Varshnei went to Sheffield for higher education in glass technology and joined United Provinces Glass Works. The factory made rapid strides in all directions and Indian made pressed wares of all kinds, tumblers, plates, jars and electric lamp shades were introduced in the market for the first time.

In 1942, the foundation stone of the Seraikella Glass Works at Kandra, Jharkhand was laid and his second eldest son Sri Harish Chandra Varshnei started the first sheet glass factory in India. After this, Sri Iswar Das Varshnei devoted his time to social work, and the industrial and educational progress of the country. He confined his activities in this sphere to his town of Bahjoi and dedicated his life to the glass industry in India. He identified himself with the glass industry in the following capacities :-

1. Chairman of the Glass Panel, which was appointed by the Government, for the purpose of development of the glass industry in the country. 2. Member of the advisory board, Uentra.l Glass & Ceramic Institute, Jadavpur, Calcutta. · 3. President of the Indian Glass Manufacturers' Association. 4. President of the U. P. Glass Manufacturers' Syndicate. 5. President .of Indian Ceramic Society. 6. President of the Indian Overseas Section of the Society of Glass Technology, Sheffield (England).

He was also the Founder and the Life President of the I. D. Technical Institute, Bahjoi, the foundation stone of which was laid by him in 1943. He devoted the latter part of his life to organizing and developing this Institution. Besides this, he organized several small schools in the rural areas and was connected with many other educational institutions. The history of the U. P. Glass Works., Bahjoi is a veritable romance in enterprise, skill, devotion, sacrifice, perseverance and patience. Shri Ishwardas Varshnei, led the life of a saint and spent his earnings like a saint. He donated about rupees seven lakhs to charities. The I. D. Educational Institute is a standing monument to his munificence.

The I. D. Varshnei Memorial Lecture of the Indian Ceramic Society is given in his honor.

Sri Iswar Das Varshnei died in 1948 and was survived by three of his four sons. The eldest, Sri Bishambar Dayal Varshney who died in 1939, introduced hollow ware technology to India. His second son, Sri Harish Chandra Varshnei is credited with the introduction of sheet glass manufacturing (with the Fourcault process) to Continental Asia (ex-Japan) in the 1920s. His third and fourth sons, Sri Suresh Chandra Varshnei and Sri Krishan Chandra Varshnei are credited with introducing many innovations and patents in of sheet glass manufacturing .

Sri Prem chandra Varshnei son of Sri Harish Chandra Varshnei who graduated in Glass Science from Alfred University USA in 1949 started the first Borosilicate Neutral glass manufacture plant for pharmaceutical and scientific applications for the first time in India in 1951 and introduced innovation in the Sheet Glass manufacturing process. He was also the past president of Indian Ceramic Society and All India Glass Manufacturers federation.The Varshnei family is considered as the pioneers of the Glass Industry in India.
