= Kaliya Mardan =

- Kaliya Mardan
- Directed by: Dadasaheb Phalke
- Written by: Dadasaheb Phalke
- Produced by: Hindustan Cinema Films
- Starring: Neelkanth, Mandakini Phalke
- Release date: 1919
- Running time: 47 min / 6000 ft
- Country: India
- Languages: Silent film Marathi intertitles

Kaliya Mardan (also known as The Childhood of Krishna) is a 1919 Indian silent film directed by Dadasaheb Phalke. It contains Marathi subtitles. Only 4441 ft are still available.

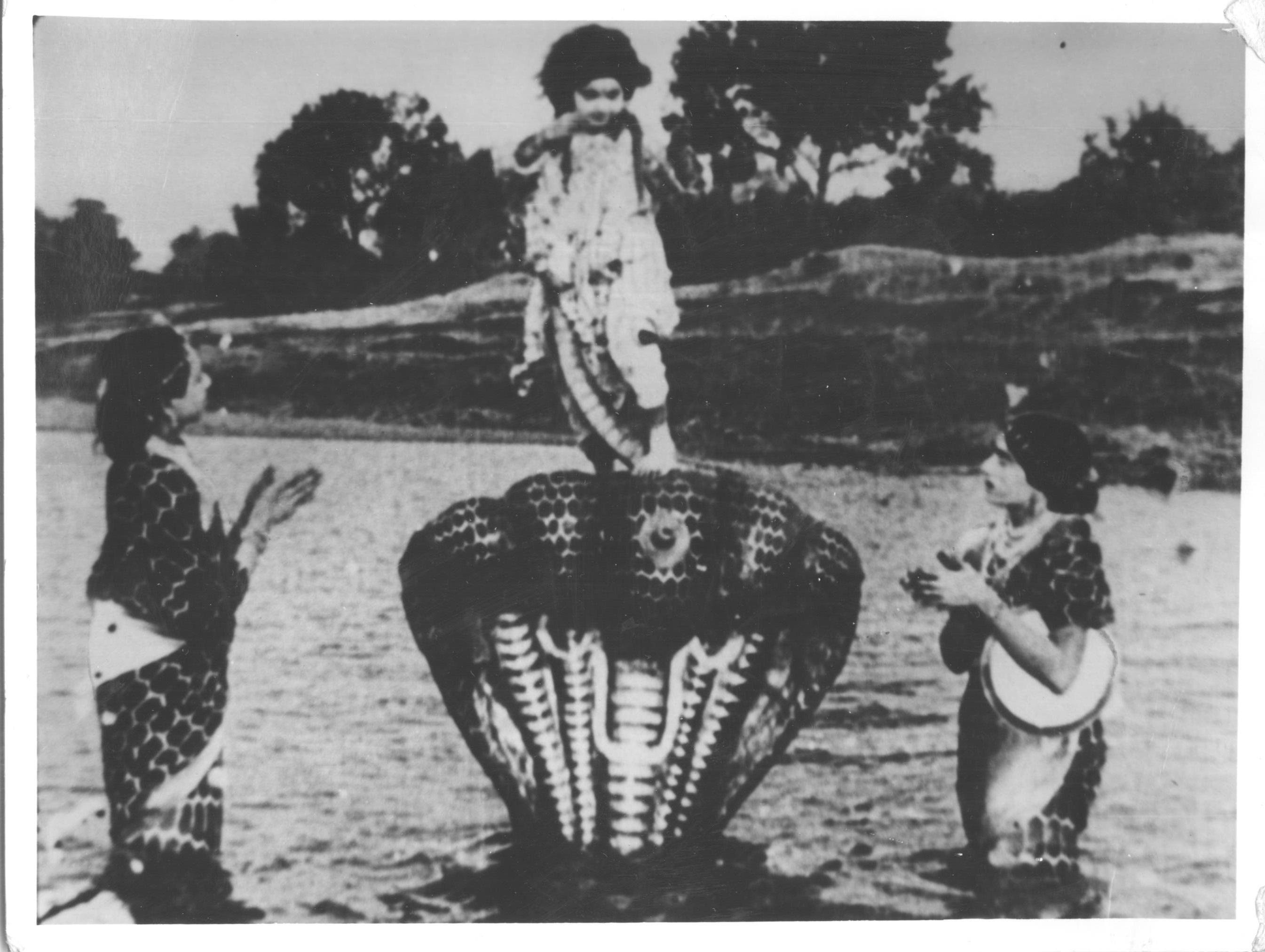
A still from the film Kaliya Mardan showing child Krishna vanquishing the venomous serpent Kaliya.
