= Mangeshkar =

Mangeshkar (Marathi: मंगेशकर) is a common Marathi surname. Notable people with the surname include:

- Deenanath Mangeshkar (1900–1942), Marathi actor and musician
- Hridaynath Mangeshkar (1937), Indian composer
- Lata Mangeshkar (1929–2022), Indian playback singer
- Usha Mangeshkar (born 1935), Indian singer
