= Jahangirpur, Uttar Pradesh =

Jahangirpur
- Town
- Location in Uttar Pradesh, India Jahangirpur (India)
- Coordinates: 28.18°N 77.72°E
- Country: India
- State: Uttar Pradesh
- District: Gautam Buddha Nagar

Government
  - Type: Nagar Panchayat

Area
  - Total: 10.03 km^{2} (3.87 sq mi)
- Elevation: 196 m (643 ft)

Population (2011)
  - Total: 11,006
  - Density: 1,097.3/km^{2} (2,842/sq mi)

Language
  - Official: Hindi
  - Additional official: Urdu
- Time zone: UTC+5:30 (IST)
- PIN: 203141
- Vehicle registration: UP-16
- Website: up.gov.in

Jahangirpur is a town in Jewar Tehsil, Gautam Buddha Nagar district of Uttar Pradesh, India. It is located 32 km towards the south from district headquarters of Greater Noida. Jahangirpur is surrounded by Tappal towards the South, Palwal towards the west and Dankaur towards the north. Jewar, Sikandrabad and Khurja are some of the nearby cities to Jahangirpur.

== Geography ==
Jahangirpur is mainly connected to other major cities and towns by roads such as GT Road and Yamuna Expressway.

There is no railway station within 10 km of Jahangirpur. Khurja Railway Junction (12 km) and Faridabad Railway Station (45 km) are the nearest railway stations to Jahangirpur.

== Demographics ==
According to the 2011 Indian Census, Jahangirpur had a population of 11,006 of which 5,819 were males and 5,187 females. Population within the age group 0 to 6 years was 1,777. The total number of literates in Jahangirpur was 5,906 which constituted to 53.7% of the population. Male literacy made up 61.8% of all literates and female literacy 44.6%. The literacy of age group 7+ in Jahangirpur made up 64% of which male literacy was 74.1% and female literacy 52.8%. The Scheduled Castes population was 1,337. Jahangirpur had 1818 households in 2011.
