= Vasant Desai =

Indian composer (1912-1975)

- Born: 9 June 1912; Sonawade village, Sindhudurg, Maharashtra, India
- Died: 22 December 1975 (aged 63); Bombay
- Occupation: film song composer
- Website: www.soundsofsonawade.com

Vasant Desai (1912–1975) was an Indian film music composer, most remembered for his score in V. Shantaram films like Jhanak Jhanak Payal Baaje (1955), Do Aankhen Barah Haath (1957), Vijay Bhatt's Goonj Uthi Shehnai (1959), Sampoorna Ramayan (1961), Ashirwad (1968) and Hrishikesh Mukherjee's Guddi (1971).

== Early life ==
Desai was born in 1912 into a wealthy family in Sonawade village, Maharashtra state, ruled by the Bhonsale clan, and grew up in Kudal area, also in Konkan belt, Sindhudurg district, Maharashtra in western India.

== Career ==
Desai was with the famous Prabhat Film Company since it started making talkies. He acted, sang, and sometimes composed songs in Prabhat's films like Dharmatma and Sant Dnyaneshwar. After learning the craft of music composition, he stuck solely to it from the 1940s.

Desai scored music for a majority of V. Shantaram's films when the latter broke away from Prabhat to form his own film studio. Their relations soured in the late 1950s after which Desai never worked for his former mentor again.

Desai's memorable songs are, Hindi devotional film song "Ae malik tere bande hum" from Do Aankhen Barah Haath, 1957, and playback singer Vani Jairam's debut song "Bol re papihara" from Guddi (1971).

Maithreem Bhajata is a benediction composed in Sanskrit by Sant Jagadguru Shri Chandrasekharendra Saraswati of the Kanchi Mutt. The song was set to a Ragamalika by composer Shri Vasant Desai. It was rendered at the United Nations on 23 October 1966, UN day, by Bharat Ratna Smt. M. S. Subbulakshmi.

In Marathi, some of Desai's memorable songs are Sanga mukund kuni ha pahila, Uthi uthi Gopala from Amar Bhoopali (1951), Manuskichya shatrusange yuddha amuche suru from Chota Jawan (1963), Deh devache mandir from Preeti Sangam (1972), Ramya hi swargahuni Lanka from Swayamwar Zale Siteche (1974).

== Last recording ==
Vasant Desai went back home on 22 December 1975 after a full-day recording of a special musical programme at the studios of His Master's Voice, attended by high-profile musicians as it was in praise of Indira Gandhi. He stepped into the elevator of his apartment building and due to a technical glitch, the lift began to move, crushing him to death.

== Partial filmography ==
=== Hindi Films ===
- Shobha (1942)
- Shakuntala (1943)
- Aankh Ki Sharm (1943)
- Mouj (1943)
- Subhadra (1946)
- Jeevan Yatra (1946)
- Dr. Kotnis Ki Amar Kahani (1946)
- Parbat Pe Apna Dera (1946)
- Matwala Shair Ram Joshi (1947)
- Andhon Ki Duniya (1947)
- Sona (1948)
- Mandir (1948)
- Uddhaar (1949)
- Narasinha Avatar (1949)
- Nai Taleem (1949)
- Dahej (1950)
- Sheesh Mahal (1950)
- Hindustan Hamara (1950)
- Jeevan Taara (1951)
- Hyderabad Ki Nazneen (1952)
- Jhansi Ki Rani (1953)
- Dhuaan (1953)
- Anand Bhavan (1953)
- Savdhan (1954)
- Jhanak Jhanak Payal Baaje (1955)
- Toofan Aur Deeya (1956)
- Do Aankhen Barah Haath (1957)
- Mausi (1958)
- Do Phool (1958)
- Do Behnen (1959)
- Ardhangini (1959)
- Goonj Utthi Shehnai (1959)
- School Master (1959)
- Samrat Prithviraj Chauhan (1959)
- Amar Shaheed (1959)
- Sampoorna Ramayana (1961)
- Pyar Ki Pyas (1961)
- Yaadein (1964)
- Rahul (1964)
- Bharat Milap (1965)
- Ladki Sahyadri Ki (1966)
- Amar Jyoti (1967)
- Ram Rajya (1967)
- Ashirwad (1968)
- Guddi (1971)
- Achanak (1973)
- Jai Radhakrishna (1974)
- Rani Aur Laal Pari (1975)
- Grahan (1976)
- Shaque (1977)

=== Marathi Films and Plays ===
- Amar Bhoopali (Marathi)
- Shyamchi Aai (1953) (Marathi)
- Molkarin (Marathi)
- Swayamwar Zale Siteche (Marathi)
- Laxmanrekha (Marathi)
- Tooch Mazi Rani (Marathi)
- Kanchanganga (Marathi)
- Chota Jawan (Marathi)
- Dev Deenaghari Dhavala (Marathi Drama)
- Panditraj Jagganath (Marathi musical drama)
- Jai Jai GauriShankar (Marathi musical drama)
- Sangeet Mandarmala (Marathi musical drama)
