= Satyavan Savitri =

- Directed by: Dadasaheb Phalke
- Produced by: Phalke Films
- Release date: 1914
- Country: India
- Languages: Silent Film; Marathi intertitles

Satyavan Savitri (Marathi: सत्यवान सावित्री) is a 1914 Indian silent film, directed and produced by Indian icon Dadasaheb Phalke. It was the second feature film created by Phalke.

== Overview ==
The film is based on the 'Savitri and Satyavan' story appearing in the 'Book of Forest' of the Mahabharat. This movie was also referenced in the movie Harishchandrachi Factory. A scene portraying the advertising campaign for this film is shown Rajkumar Chaudhary
