= Shri Krishna Janma =

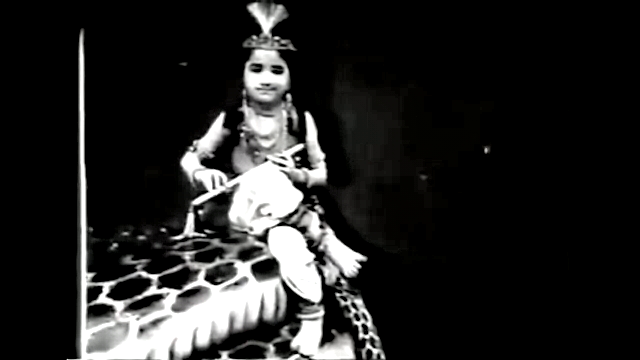
- Neelkanth Mandakini as Krishna in Shri Krishna Janma
- Directed by: Dadasaheb Phalke
- Written by: Dadasaheb Phalke
- Produced by: Hindustan Cinema Films
- Starring: Bhagirathibai, D. D. Dabke, Neelkanth Mandakini Phalke, Purshottam Vaidya
- Release date: 1918
- Running time: 12 min / 5500 ft
- Country: British India
- Languages: Silent film Marathi intertitles

Full movie

Shri Krishna Janma (Birth of Lord Krishna) is a 1918 Indian silent film directed by Dadasaheb Phalke. It contain Marathi subtitles. Only the last episode is still available (576 ft).
