= Dadasaheb Torne =

Indian director and producer (1890-1960)

Dadasaheb Torane
- Born: Ramchandra Gopal Torne; 13 April 1890; Konkan coast, Mumbai.
- Died: 19 January 1960 (aged 69)
- Occupations: Director; producer
- Notable work: Shree Pundalik, first feature film in India

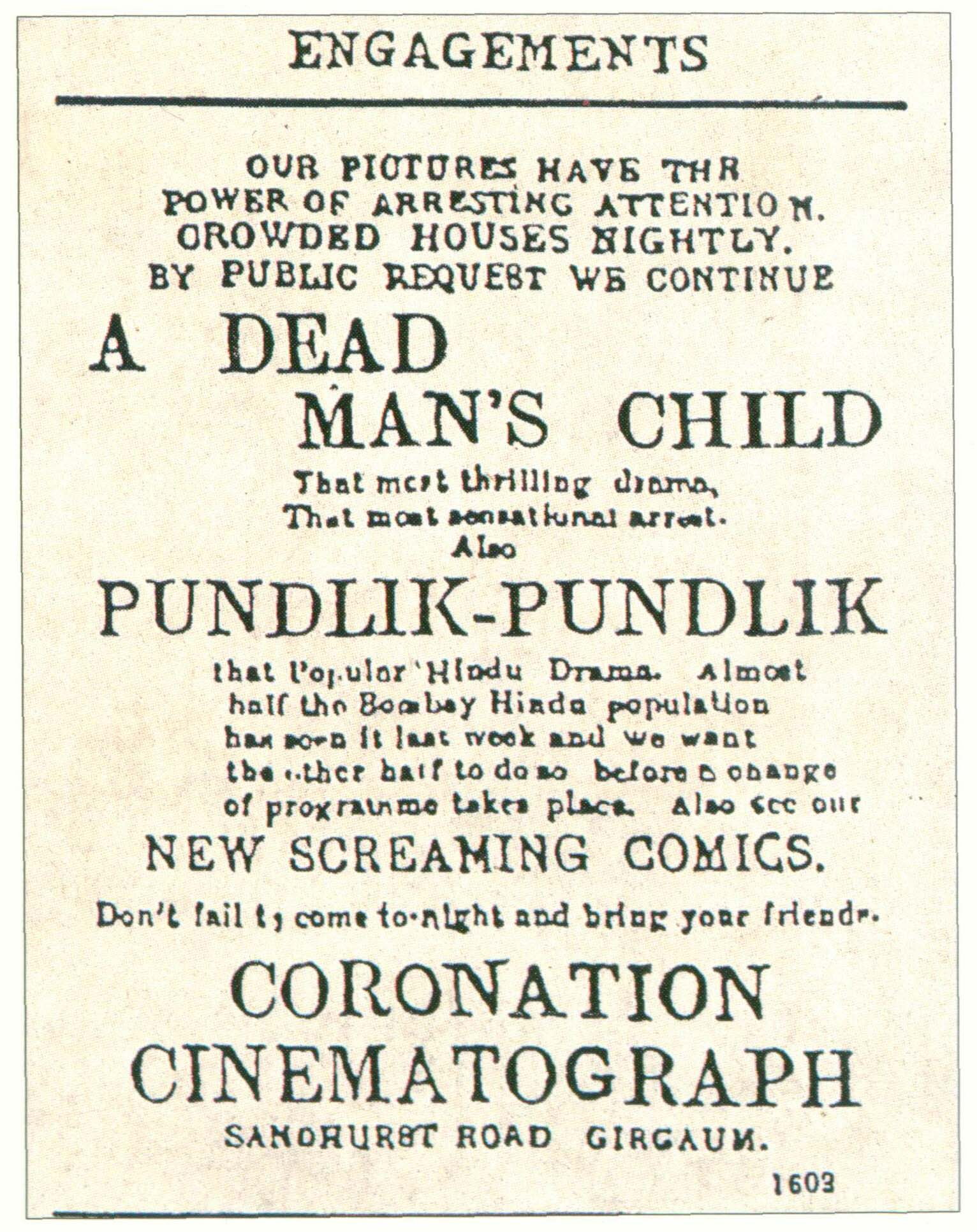
Advertisement in the Times of India on 25 May 1912 announcing the screening of the first feature film of India, Shree Pundalik

Ramchandra Gopal Torne (Marathi: रामचंद्र गोपाळ तोरणे) (13 April 1890 – 19 January 1960), also known as Dadasaheb Torne, was an Indian director and producer, best known for making the first feature film in India, Shree Pundalik. This historic record is well established by an advertisement in The Times of India published on 25 May 1912. Several leading reference books on cinema including The Guinness Book of Movie Facts & Feats, A Pictorial History of Indian Cinema and Marathi Cinema : In Restrospect amply substantiate this milestone achievement of the pioneer Indian feature-filmmaker.

He is considered the "Father of Indian cinema."

Although Torne made his first film, Shree Pundalik (पुंडलिक, 1912) just under a year before Dhundiraj Govind "Dadasaheb" Phalke made his, it is the latter who is regarded as the father of Indian cinema. The distinction may lie with the fact that, unlike Phalke, Torne sent his film overseas for processing. Moreover, Torne's Pundalik was 1,500' (c. 22 minutes) long, about 1,200' shorter than Phalke's Raja Harischandra, which ran for about 40 minutes.

== Biography ==
=== Early years ===
Ramchandra Gopal Torne was born on 13 April 1890 in Malwan village on the western Indian Konkan coast near Mumbai. Following his father's death, the young boy and his mother were asked to leave the house by his uncle and they were forced to live in poverty.

At the age of 10 or 11, and with only four years of formal education behind him, Torne dropped out of school and headed to Mumbai. Once there, he was employed by the Cotton Green Electrical Company, where he learned basic electrical installation and instrument repair.

=== Career ===
==== First shooting of an Indian film ====
This is where he got in touch with the Shripad theater company. He was quite impressed by the plays conducted by this company as well as the new foreign films which were being released in Mumbai. As a young man of 21–22, he got interested in making his own movie. With another friend and financier, Mr. Chitre, he managed to import raw film and movie camera from abroad, and shot the first Indian feature film Shree Pundalik. This first Indian feature film was released on 18 May 1912 in Mumbai's Coronation movie theater. Almost one year after this movie was released, Dadasaheb Phalke released the second Indian feature film Raja Harischandra in the same theater on 3 May 1913. Pundalik continued to run in the same movie theatre in Mumbai for about two weeks. The advertisement for the film published in The Times of India used such attractive announcements to lure more viewers-- "Half of the Mumbai Hindu population has seen it, the remaining half should also see it".

Pundalik was in fact shooting of a play in film-mode. The camera used to be fixed on one platform and was a very heavy opto-mechanical-electrical instrument. So only "one angle" movie recording was possible. There was no concept of editing or close-up shots, etc. After watching the recorded movie, Dadasaheb was not happy with the overall performance and the effect it was giving. He decided to record it in parts and then join the film together. This is the job now professionally done by the film editor and is an important job in the movie industry today. Many effects will be ineffective if the editor does not do his job properly. For example, in a standard recorded fight scene, there are at least 36 shots shown in the span of 30 seconds. Dadasaheb was an original director, special effects person, editor, sound recordist and a master of many other techniques now commonly used in modern movie-making.

==== Film production and distribution company ====
Dadasaheb Torne was working in Greaves Cotton company when this movie was released. The company transferred him to Karachi. He caught another young man there, Baburao Pai, and started releasing Hollywood movies in Karachi. For this he opened offices in Karachi and other places. He is the first Indian to open the distribution offices and a movie distribution company. In the next 3–4 years, he spent with Baburao Painter in Kolhapur. After coming back to Mumbai he started his own "Movie Camera Company". Due to the first World War in Europe, he established contacts in the United States of America. He started importing all the relevant instruments required for the movie industry, like cameras, film etc. This company turned out to be a big boon to the film-makers of that time and immediately became the buzz-word. All his efforts eventually paid off and many new movie companies were soon formed. Around 1929, with his colleague Baburao Pai, he started a joint venture company, "Famous Pictures". This movie distribution company created history and made crores of rupee business in that era, right from the silent movies to the talkies.

==== Torne and Ardeshir Irani ====
Famous Pictures had started already importing Hollywood movies, some of them talkies. This was a big revolution for the film industry. Additionally, there was new technology involved. Realizing the importance of the talkies, Dadasaheb Torne saw that the talkies were becoming popular day by day. With his foresight he bought the agency of the Talkie-Machinery and, with the help of Americans, he learned how to use it. A few years earlier, while working in the Royal Art Studio of Mumbai, he met Ardeshir Irani. He advised Irani to start his own studio (the famous Jyoti Studio) and film production company (The Imperial Film Company). Irani appointed Dadasaheb as a manager at both the places. Later, on Dadasaheb's advice, Irani formed another company out of the unit of Imperial Film company, the Sagar Film Company. Around this time, Dadasaheb directed two films: Sindabad the Sailor (1930) and Dilbar (1931). Both were silent movies. Next he again advised Irani to make a talkie. They had now all the machinery required for the production and taught the technicians in the Imperial Company, how to use it. The work on Alam Ara was kept secret. Within a span of two months, history was created: on 14 March 1931, India's first talkie, Alam Ara, was released in the Majestic Cinema Theater.

There was an overwhelming response to Alam Ara. After this success, he immediately supplied the machinery to Prabhat, Ranajit, Wadia, etc. studios. These studios started making new talkies. The end of silent movies had come. The scene now was completely different.

==== Later productions ====
Dadasaheb decided to form his own company and stop working under the supervision of others. In Pune near Shankarshet Road, he formed his own company, called Saraswati Cinetone (सरस्वती सिनेटोन). The company's first movie was Sham Sundar. The first Silver Jubilee movie of the Indian film industry, it turned out to be legendary. It introduced two young artists, Shahu Modak and Shanta Apte. Chintamanrao Modak, the famous sound recordist, and Baapurao Ketkar, the famous music director, began their careers on this movie. The company's second movie was Aout Ghatakecha Raja, which introduced Master Viththal (who later became famous as Indian Douglas) as director. The first double role in Indian film was in this movie.

The third movie was Bhakta Pralhaad, which famously had a large amount of trick photography. Through his mastery of the lens, several optical effects were created. The special effects were appreciated by Indian as well as foreign technicians. He was a pioneer in many respects. He introduced many firsts in the film industry. Many talented artists such as Mehboob Khan (Mehboob Studio), Kardar, Bhalaji Pendharkar, Vishram Bedekar, R. S. Chowdhary, C. Ramchandra, Jayashree, Ratnamaalaa (Dada Kondke's "Aaye") and Alam Ara heroine Zubeida were first introduced by him. He made several movies later: Thaksen Rajputra, Chhatrapati Sambhaji, Krishnashishtai, Savitri, Raja Gopichand, Narad Naradi, Bhagva Zenda, Mazi Ladki, Navardev, etc. He made 17 movies: three Hindi, eight Marathi and six Hindi+Marathi. A documentary film, Akshar-Olakh, was produced for the "Saksharata Prasar Mandal". This film was produced more a social commitment than for entertainment or business. The last movie of Saraswati Cinetone was Aawaj, released on 22 May 1942, starring Maya Banerji, Swarnalata and Waasti.

=== Final years ===
Most of these movies and their sole copies were burnt. He had built a studio in Pune, which was sold to Chakan Oil Mill and today where Kumar Pacific Mall stands. In 1947, when he had gone out of town for some work, his colleague and friend stole all the movie cameras and other expensive equipment and took it to Pakistan. Religious fanaticism won over the decades-old friendship. This shook him badly and had his first heart attack in 1947. But his mother helped him come out of this agony and loss. His career was now over after such a blow from someone he knew and worked with for several decades. In his later years he had retired from the industry and as it is the industry was now changing its colors and ways quite rapidly. The movie Shamsundar had given him the financial stability and he lived in his house "Chandrika" (name of his mother) at Shivajinagar. He died there on the morning of 19 January 1960 in his sleep.

== Cinematography ==
No.	Name of production	Year	Language	Participation
1	Pundalik	1912	Silent	Producer / Director
2	Sati ka Shaap (Curse of Sati)	1923	Silent	Assistant Producer
3	Prithvivallabh	1924	Silent	Assistant Producer
4	Neera	1926	Silent	Assistant Director
5	Sindabad Khalasi (Sindabad the Sailor)	1930	Silent	Story/Director
	Talkies
6	Shamsundar	1932	Hindi/Marathi	Producer / Sound Recordist
7	Aout Ghatakecha Raja	1933	Marathi	Producer / Sound Recordist
	Aawara Shahjada	1933	Hindi	Producer / Sound Recordist
8	Bhakta Pralhad	1933	Hindi/Marathi	Producer / Manager /Sound Recordist
9	Chhatrapati Sambhaji	1934	Marathi	Producer
10	Thakasen Rajputra	1934	Marathi	Producer / Director
	Bhedi Rajkumar	1934	Hindi	Producer / Director
11	Krishna-Shishtai (Krishna's Negotiations)	1935	Hindi	Producer
12	Savitri	1936	Marathi	Producer / Sound Recordist
13	Raja Gopichand	1938	Hindi/Marathi	Producer / Editor
14	Sach Hai	1939	Hindi	Producer
15	Bhagwa Zenda	1939	Marathi	Producer
16	Mazi Ladaki (My Beloved)	1939	Marathi	Producer / Director
17	Devayani	1940	Marathi	Producer
18	Narad-Naradi	1941	Marathi	Producer / Director
19	Navardev (Bridegroom)	1941	Marathi	Producer / Director
20	Aawaj (Sound)	1942	Hindi	Producer
