= Shree Pundalik =

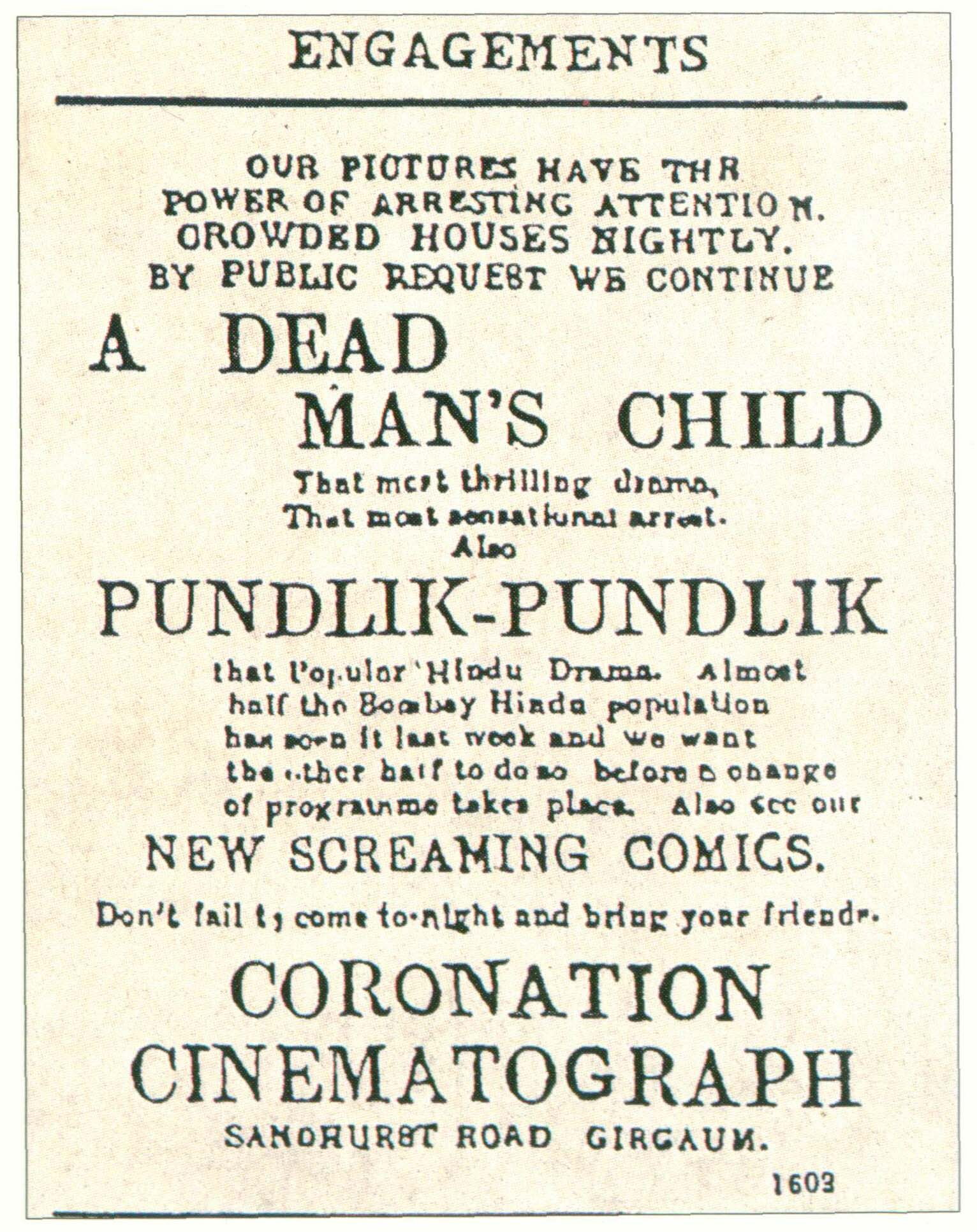
- Advertisement in The Times of India of 25 May 1912 announcing the screening of Shree Pundalik
- Directed by: Dadasaheb Torne
- Produced by: Dadasaheb Torne
- Release date: 18 May 1912 (India)
- Country: India
- Language: Silent

Shree Pundalik, which was released on 18 May 1912 at the Coronation Cinematograph, Girgaum, Mumbai, is sometimes considered the first feature-length Indian film by a minority. The government of India and most scholarly sources consider Raja Harishchandra to be the first Indian feature film, and detractors argue Pundalik was only a photographic recording of a popular play. It was produced and directed by Dadasaheb Torne.

== History ==
Shree Pundalik was a silent film. Torne and his colleagues Nanasaheb Chitre and Ramrao Kirtikar wrote the shooting script.

Shree Pundalik was sent overseas for processing by Dadasaheb Torne. Torne's Pundalik was about 1,500 feet or about 22 minutes long. The film had a shooting script, was shot with a camera, and its negatives were sent to London for processing. Positives were produced and finally released at Coronation Cinematograph, Girgaon. The film ran for two weeks.

== Debates about the film ==
Some writers, film critics and historians like Firoze Rangoonwalla, Arnab Jan Deka, Sanjit Narwekar have argued that Dadasaheb Torne was the father of Indian cinema, as his first directed and produced feature film Pundalik was officially released on 18 May 1912, almost one year before Dadasaheb Phalke's Raja Harishchandra, released on 3 May 1913. Arnab Jan Deka published a research paper with the title Bharatiya Chalachitrar Janak Bhatawdekar aru Torne (Fathers of Indian Cinema Bhatawdekar and Torne) in the daily newspaper Dainik Asam on 27 October 1996. Books on cinema like A Pictorial History of Indian Cinema and Marathi Cinema : In Perspective support this perspective. However, most scholarly sources agree that Raja Harishchandra, which was released nearly a year later, is more deserving of the title of the first Indian film. Some have argued that Pundalik does not deserve the honour of being called the first Indian film because it was a photographic recording of a popular Marathi play, and because the cameraman—a man named Johnson—was a British national and the film was processed in London.

== Centennial ==
Shree Pundalik celebrated its centennial on 18 May 2012.
