= List of Marathi film families =

This article lists notable families in Marathi cinema whose members, across multiple generations or through close familial relationships, have been involved in various film-related professions, including acting, directing, producing, and music. Several of these families are also connected to one another, as well as to prominent families in Hindi and other Indian film industries.

== A ==
=== Apte family ===
- Shanta Apte — actress and singer; regarded as one of the "great singing stars" of Indian cinema before the playback singing era
  - Nayana Apte Joshi — actress and singer; daughter of Shanta Apte; recipient of the Padma Shri; worked in Marathi, Hindi and Gujarati films, theatre and television

== B ==
=== Bandekar family ===
- Aadesh Bandekar — actor and producer
- Suchitra Bandekar — actress and producer; wife of Aadesh Bandekar
  - Soham Bandekar — actor; son of Aadesh and Suchitra Bandekar
  - Pooja Birari — actress; wife of Soham Bandekar
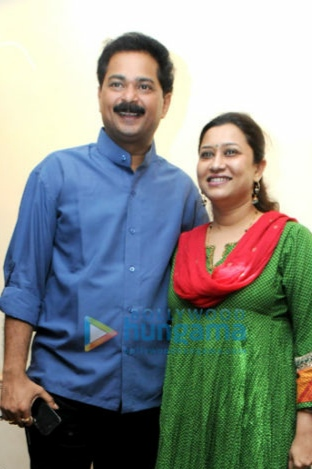
Aadesh and Suchitra Bandekar

=== Berde family ===
- Ravindra Berde (1945–2023) — actor; elder brother of Laxmikant Berde
- Laxmikant Berde (1954–2004) — actor; "Superstar of Marathi Cinema"; part of the 1980s–90s Marathi comedy quartet with Sachin Pilgaonkar, Mahesh Kothare and Ashok Saraf; also worked in numerous Hindi films
  - Ruhi Berde (d.1998) — actress; first wife of Laxmikant Berde
  - Priya Berde (née Priya Arun) — actress; second wife of Laxmikant Berde; co-founded the production house Abhinay Arts with him; daughter of Marathi theatre actress Lata Arun and director Arun Karnataki
    - Abhinay Berde — actor; son of Laxmikant and Priya Berde
    - Swanandi Berde — actress; daughter of Laxmikant and Priya Berde
- Purshottam Berde (b. 1959) — playwright and director; cousin-brother of Laxmikant Berde; directed the hit play Tur Tur (1983–84), in which Laxmikant first gained recognition

=== Bhende family ===
- Prakash Bhende (1942–2025) — actor, director, producer and painter
- Uma Bhende (1945–2017) — actress and producer; founder of Shri Prasad Chitra; daughter of playwright Shrikrishna Sakarikar and Prabhat Film Company employee Ramadevi; married to Prakash Bhende
  - Prasad Bhende — cinematographer; known for films such as Duniyadari (2013), Mitwaa (2015) and Gharat Ganpati (2024); son of Prakash and Uma Bhende
    - Shweta Mahadik — actress; wife of Prasad Bhende
  - Prasanna Bhende — executive producer; son of Prakash and Uma Bhende; married to Kimaya Bhende

== D ==
=== Damle family ===
- Vishnupant Govind Damle (1892–1945) — production designer, cinematographer, sound engineer and director; co-founded Prabhat Film Company in 1929; co-directed Sant Tukaram (1936), one of the first Indian films to receive international recognition.
  - Vasantrao "Pandit" Damle (1928–2015) — son of Vishnupant Damle; worked as a child actor in Prabhat films including Sant Tukaram and Kunku; author of a memoir on Prabhat's history
  - Anantrao Damle — son of Vishnupant Damle; worked to repurchase and preserve original Prabhat film prints after the studio closed
    - Anil Anant Damle — produced the 2011 National Award–winning documentary Vishnupant Damle : The Unsung Hero Of Talkies, about his grandfather

=== Deo family ===
Ramesh Deo and Seema Deo were a leading acting couple of Marathi and Hindi cinema, and their sons have carried the family's presence in film into acting and direction.

- Ramesh Deo (1929–2022) — actor, director and producer; worked in over 285 Hindi films, 190 Marathi films and 30 Marathi stage plays
- Seema Deo (née Nalini Saraf; 1942–2023) — actress; appeared in over 80 Marathi and Hindi films
  - Ajinkya Deo — actor; elder son of Ramesh and Seema Deo; leading Marathi film star of the 1980s–90s;
  - Aarti Deo — wife of Ajinkya Deo
    - Arya Deo — actor; son of Ajinkya and Aarti Deo
    - Tanya Deo — daughter of Ajinkya and Aarti Deo
  - Abhinay Deo — film and television director; younger son of Ramesh and Seema Deo; directed Delhi Belly (2011) and Game (2011)
  - Smita Deo — chef; wife of Abhinay Deo
    - Yug Deo — son of Abhinay and Smita Deo
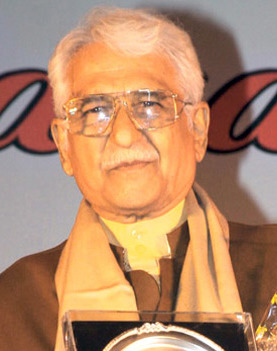
Ramesh Deo

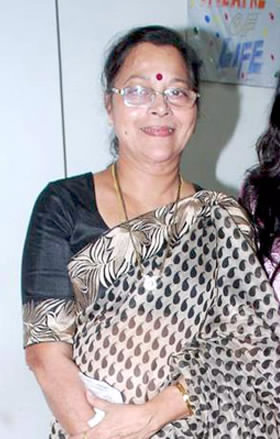
Seema Deo

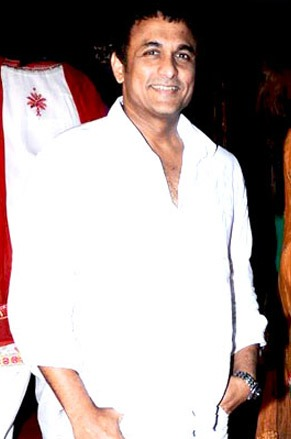
Ajinkya Deo

=== Deshmukh family ===
- Vatsala Deshmukh (1930–2022) — actress; sister of Sandhya Shantaram (see Shantaram family)
  - Ranjana Deshmukh (1952–2000) — actress, one of the leading stars in the late 1970s and 1980s; daughter of Vatsala Deshmukh; niece of V. Shantaram and Sandhya Shantaram

=== Deshpande–Subhash–Kulkarni family ===
- Govind Purushottam Deshpande (1938–2013) — playwright and scholar
  - Sudhanva Deshpande — theatre director, actor and publisher (LeftWord Books); son of Govind Purushottam Deshpande
- Jyoti Subhash — actress; younger sister of Govind Purushottam Deshpande; widow of Subhashchandra Dhembre
  - Amruta Subhash — actress; daughter of Jyoti Subhash and Subhashchandra Dhembre
    - Sandesh Kulkarni — director, writer and actor; married to Amruta Subhash; brother of Sonali Kulkarni
  - Sonali Kulkarni — actress and columnist; regarded as one of the most accomplished actresses in Marathi cinema; sister of Sandesh Kulkarni
    - Chandrakant Kulkarni — film and theatre director; first husband of Sonali Kulkarni
    - Nachiket Pantvaidya — media and entertainment executive and producer; second husband of Sonali Kulkarni
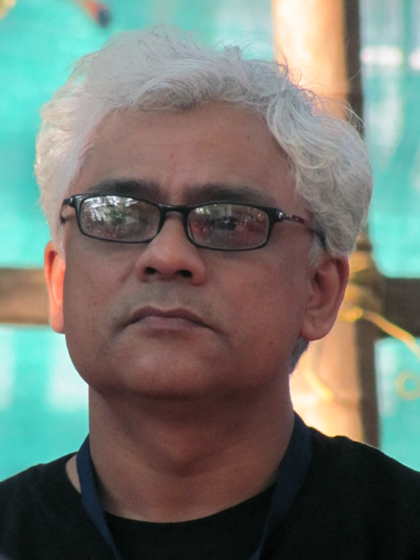
Sudhanva Deshpande

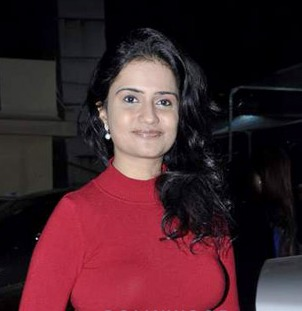
Amruta Subhash

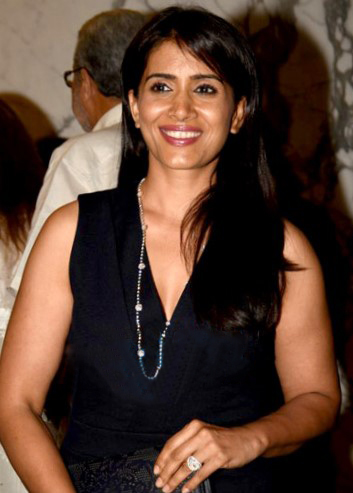
Sonali Kulkarni

== G ==
=== Gokhale family (of Mohan Gokhale) ===
- Mohan Gokhale (1953–1999)— actor
- Shubhangi Gokhale — actress; wife of Mohan Gokhale
  - Sakhi Gokhale — actress; daughter of Shubhangi and Mohan Gokhale
  - Suvrat Joshi — actor; known for Goshta Eka Paithanichi; husband of Sakhi Gokhale

== J ==
=== Jog family ===
- Shanta Jog (1925–1980) — stage actress
  - Anant Jog — actor, known for his villainous roles; son of Shanta Jog
  - Ujwala Jog — actress; wife of Anant Jog
    - Kshitee Jog — actress and producer; co-founder of Chalchitra Mandalee; daughter of Anant and Ujwala Jog
    - Hemant Dhome — actor, director and writer; co-founder of Chalchitra Mandalee; husband of Kshitee Jog

=== Joglekar family ===
- Vasant Joglekar — director and producer
  - Sumati Gupte-Joglekar — actress, producer and writer; wife of Vasant Joglekar

=== Joshi–Saraf family ===
- Gajanan Joshi — actor
- Vimal Joshi — stage actress; wife of Gajan Joshi
  - Nivedita Saraf (née Joshi) — actress; daughter of Gajan and Vimal Joshi; one of the leading actresses of Marathi cinema during the 1980s and 1990s
  - Ashok Saraf — actor; husband of Nivedita Saraf; regarded as the "Mahanayak" of Marathi cinema; member of the Marathi comedy quartet of the 1980s and 1990s
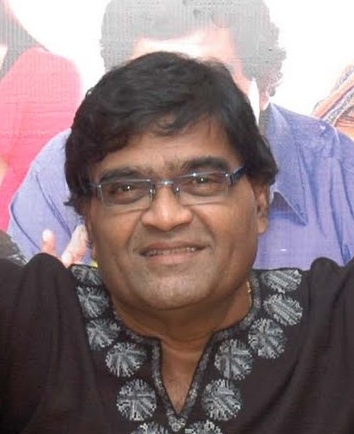
Ashok Saraf

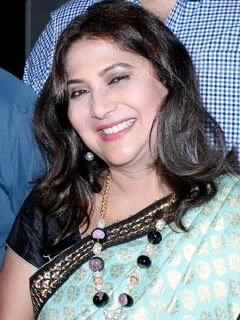
Nivedita Saraf

== K ==
=== Kamat–Gokhale family ===
- Durgabai Kamat — actress; regarded as the first female actress of Indian cinema; married to Anand Nanoskar
  - Kamlabai Gokhale (née Kamat) — actress; one of the first female child actors of Indian cinema; daughter of Durgabai Kamat and Anand Nanoskar; married to Raghunathrao Gokhale
    - Chandrakant Gokhale — actor and singer; son of Raghunathrao and Kamlabai Gokhale; married to Hemavati Gokhale
      - Vikram Gokhale — actor, worked in Marathi and Hindi films; son of Chandrakant and Hemavati Gokhale
      - Vrushali Gokhale — actress, worked in films like Aaj Jhale Mukt Mi (1986) and Aaghaat (2010); wife of Vikram Gokhale
        - Daughters: Aasavari and Neha
    - Lalji Gokhale — tabla player; second son of Raghunathrao and Kamlabai Gokhale
    - Suryakant Gokhale — tabla player; third son of Raghunathrao and Kamlabai Gokhale
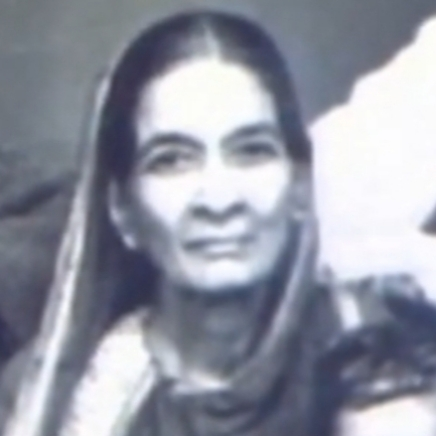
Durgabai Kamath

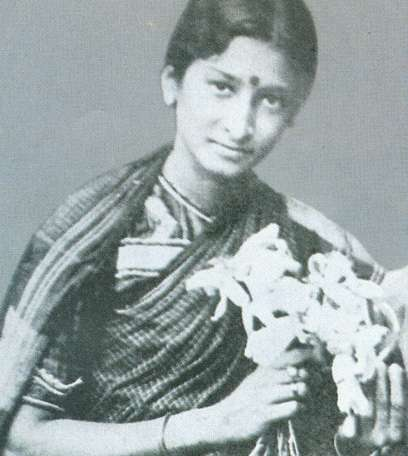
Kamlabai Gokhale

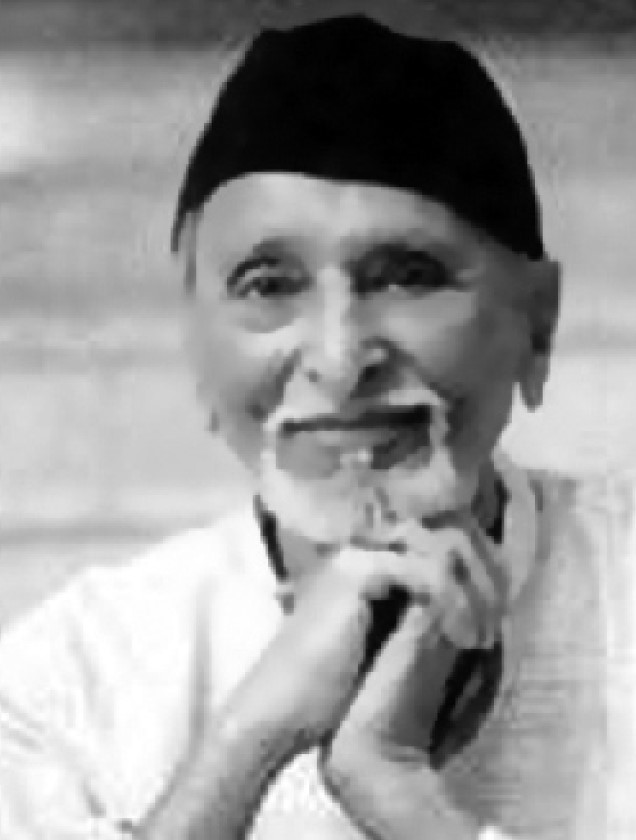
Chandrakant Gokhale

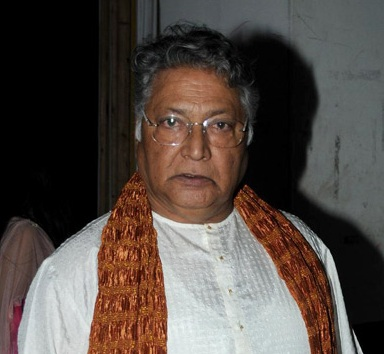
Vikram Gokhale

=== Karnataki family ===
Master Vinayak (Vinayak Damodar Karnataki) was one of the major actor-director-producers of 1930s–40s Marathi and Hindi cinema, and stood at the centre of a large network of related film families (see also Pendharkar family and Shantaram family below, to which the Karnatakis are related by blood and marriage).

- Master Vinayak (Vinayak Damodar Karnataki; 1906–1947) — actor, director and producer; introduced Lata Mangeshkar to films in Pahilee Mangalagaur
  - Half-brothers: Baburao Pendharkar and Bhalji Pendharkar (see Pendharkar family below)
  - Brother: Vasudev Karnataki — cinematographer
    - Arun Karnataki — director; son of Vasudev; nephew of Master Vinayak and first cousin of Nanda and Jaiprakash Karnataki
    - Lata Arun (née Lata Kale) — Marathi theatre actress; wife of Arun Karnataki
      - Priya Berde — actress; daughter of Arun and Lata (see Berde family above)
  - Maternal cousin: V. Shantaram (see Shantaram family below)
  - Wife: Sushila Karnataki (née Salgaokar)
    - Daughter: Nanda (Nandini Karnataki; 1939–2014) — leading Hindi and Marathi actress of the 1950s–70s; began as a child artist under the screen name “Baby Nanda” and received her breakthrough role in Toofan Aur Deeya (1956), directed by her uncle V. Shantaram.
    - Son: Jaiprakash Karnataki — Marathi film director and producer; married to actress and dancer Jayshree T.
      - Swastik Karnatki — director; son of Jaiprakash Karnataki
        - Karann Gurbaxani — director; grandson of Jaiprakash Karnataki
      - Shreyas Talpade — actor and producer; related to the family through his maternal aunt, Jayshree T.
  - Sister-in-laws: Keshar Salgaonkar and Indira Wadkar — actresses
    - Niece (by marriage): Hansa Wadkar (1923–1971) — actress; one of the leading actresses of Marathi and Hindi cinema during the 1940s and 1950s; daughter of Sushila Karnataki's brother.

=== Kher family ===
- Usha Kiran ("Usha Marathe") — actress; married to Manohar Kher
  - Advait Kher — model; son of Usha Kiran and Manohar Kher; married to Uttara Kher, model and Miss India World.
    - Saunskruti Kher — daughter of Advait and Uttara Kher
    - Saiyami Kher — actress; daughter of Advait and Uttara Kher
  - Tanvi Azmi (née Kher) — actress; daughter of Usha Kiran and Manohar Kher; married to cinematographer Baba Azmi (see Akhtar–Azmi–Kher family)

=== Khote family ===
- Durga Khote (1905–1991) — actress; one of the pioneering actresses of Indian cinema; married to Vishwanath Khote
  - Bakul Khote — son of Durga Khote
  - Harin Khote — son of Durga Khote
  - Vijaya Mehta (1934–2026) — film and theatre director and actor; wife of Harin Khote
    - Ravi Khote — actor, director and playback singer; son of Harin and Vijaya Mehta
    - Deven Khote — film producer, director, and entrepreneur; co-founder of UTV Software Communications; son of Harin and Vijaya Mehta
  - Farrokh Mehta — theatre personality; second husband of Vijaya Mehta
    - Anahita Uberoi — actor and director; daughter of Vijaya Mehta and Farrokh Mehta
- Nandu Khote — stage and silent film actor; brother-in-law of Durga Khote
  - Shubha Khote (b.1937) — actress, director, and producer; daughter of Nandu Khote
    - Bhavana Balsavar — actress; daughter of Shubha Khote
  - Viju Khote (1941–2019) — actor; son of Nandu Khote
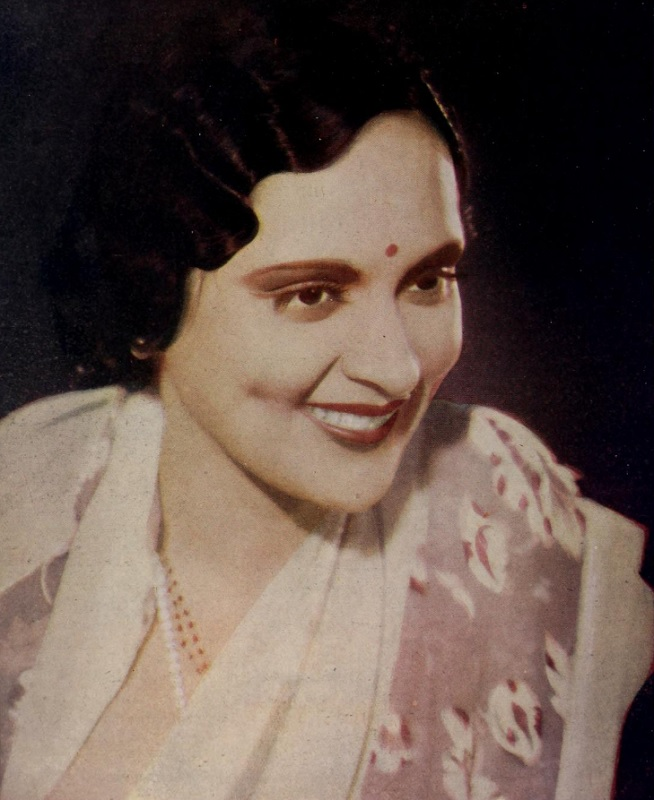
Durga Khote

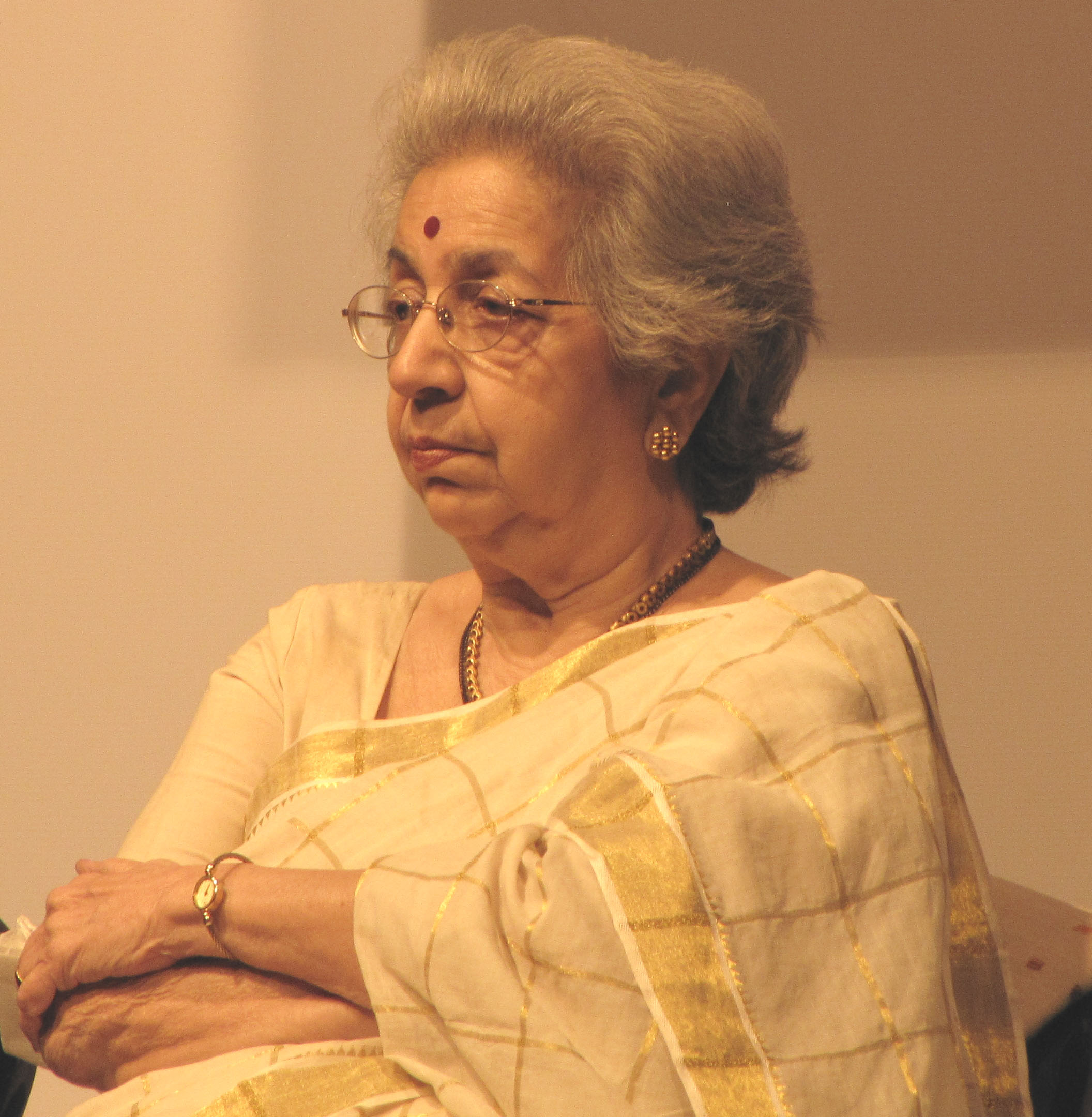
Vijaya Mehta

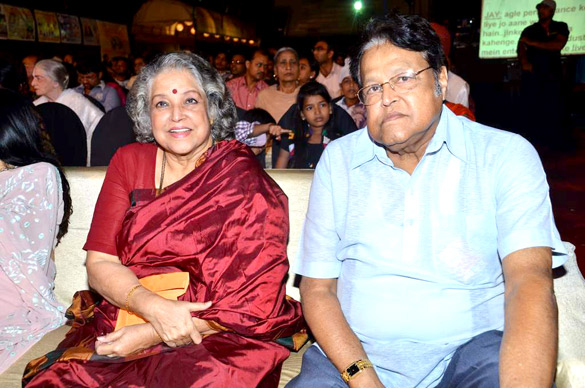
Siblings Shubha Khote and Viju Khote

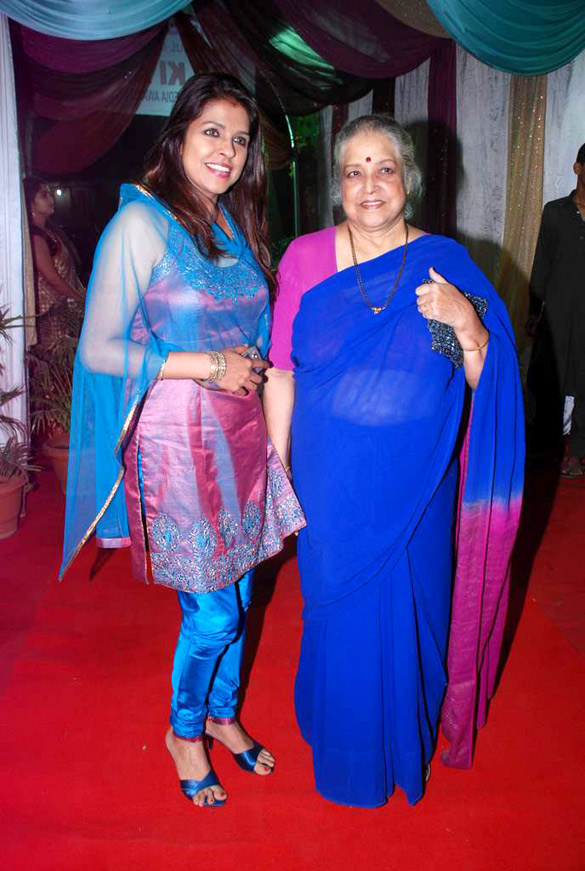
Shubha Khote with daughter Bhavana Balsaver

=== Kothare family ===
- Ambar Kothare (d.2023) — experimental theatre artist, stage actor and film producer; co-founded the theatre company Artist Combine with his wife
- Saroj Kothare ("Jenma"; d.2023) — colorist and producer; co-founded Artist Combine with husband
  - Mahesh Kothare — actor, director and producer; son of Ambar and Saroj Kothare; pioneer of technical innovation (Dolby sound, 3D) in Marathi cinema; founder of Kothare Vision
  - Neelima Kothare — wife of Mahesh Kothare
    - Adinath Kothare — actor and director; son of Mahesh and Neelima Kothare.
    - Urmila Kothare (née Kanetkar) — actress and Kathak dancer; married Adinath in 2011.
      - Jija Kothare (b. 2018) — daughter of Adinath and Urmila Kothare
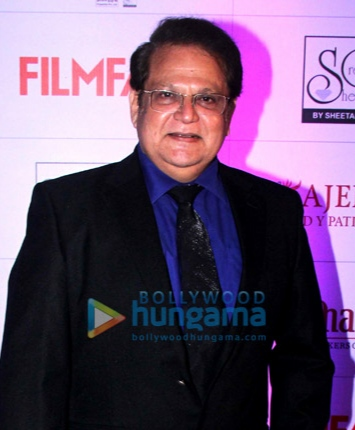
Mahesh Kothare

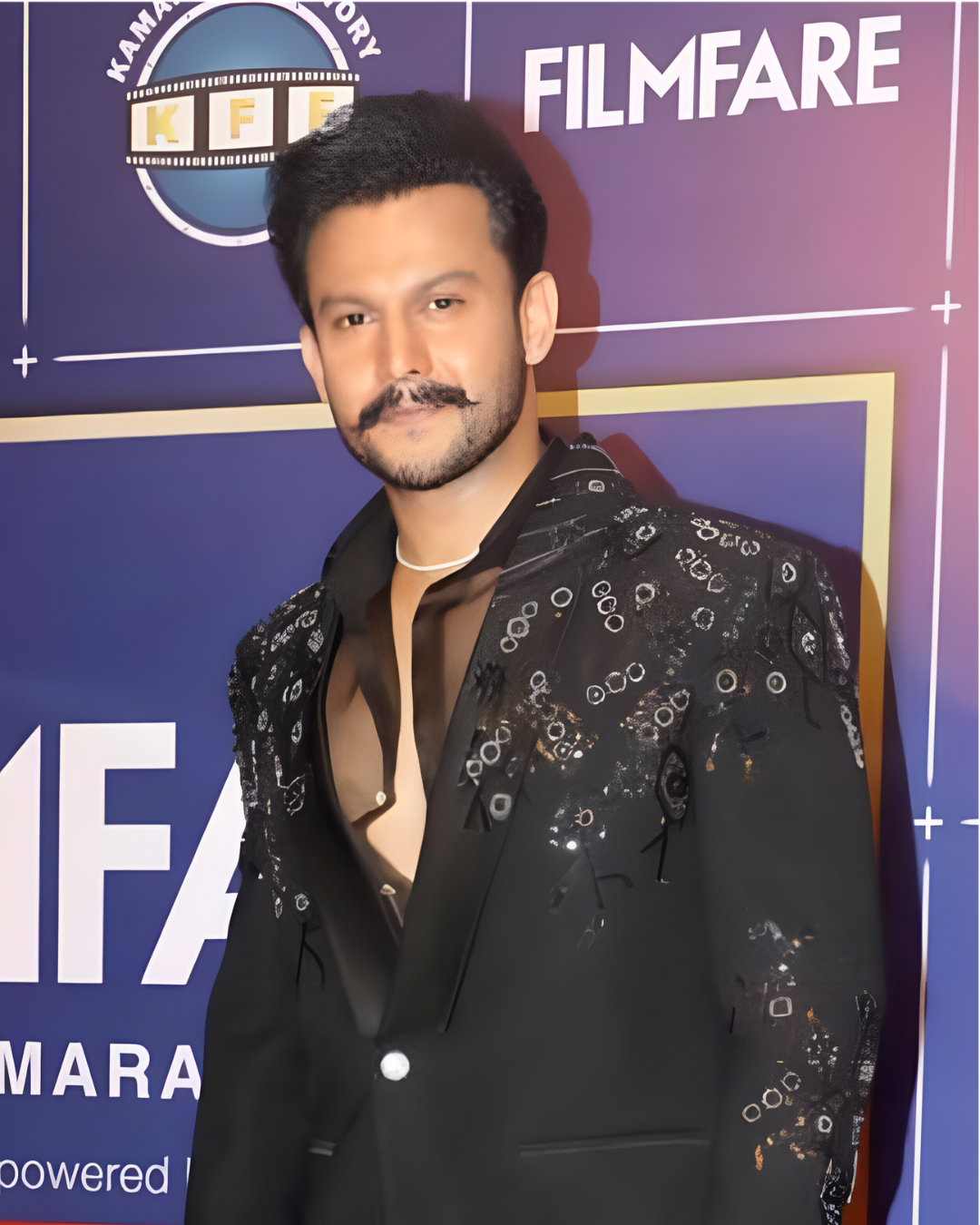
Adinath Kothare

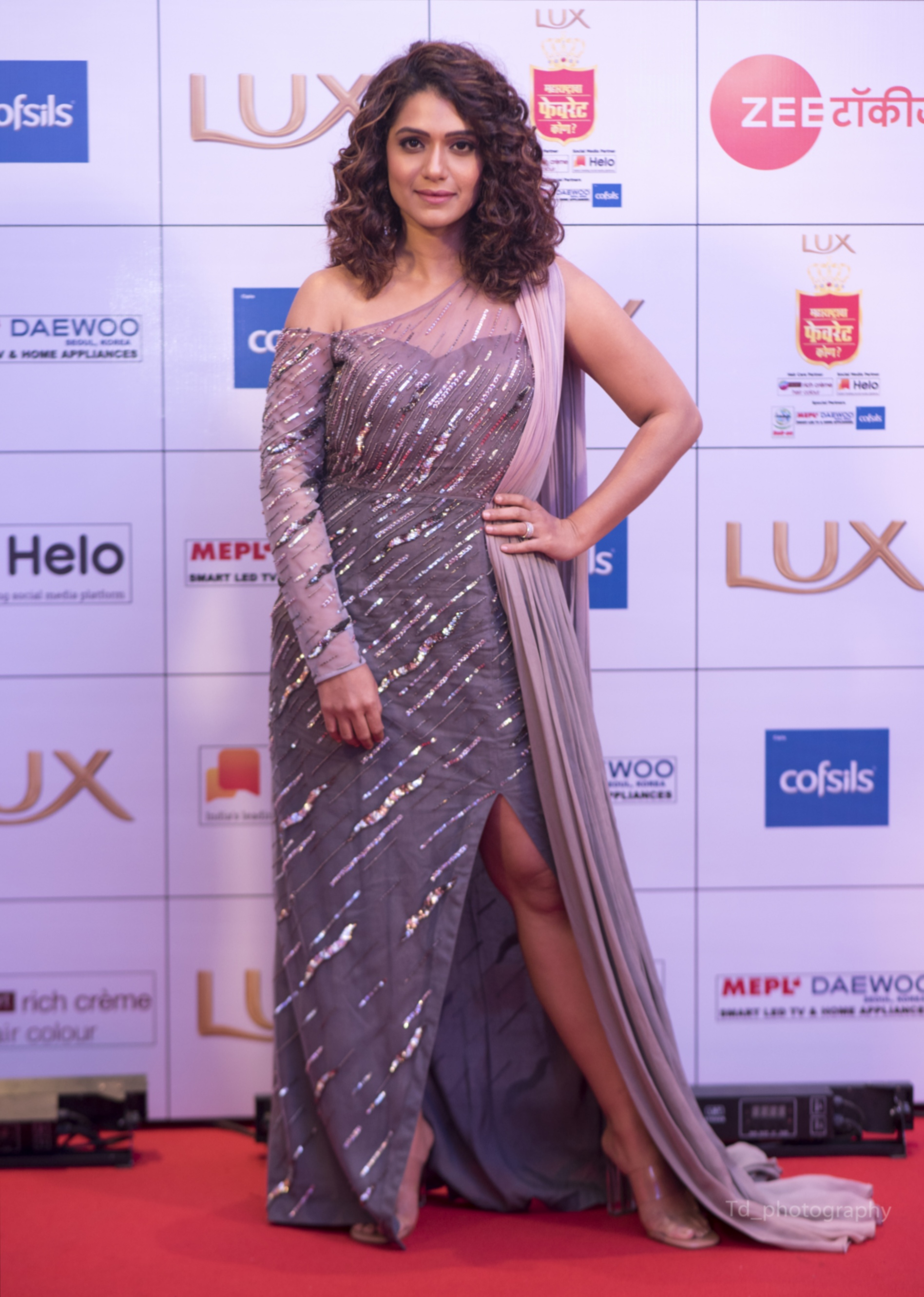
Urmilla Kothare

== L ==
=== Lagoo family (of Reema Lagoo) ===
- Reema Lagoo (née Nayan Bhadbhade; 1958–2017) — actress in Marathi and Hindi theatre, film and television; daughter of stage actress Mandakini Bhadbhade; married to Vivek Lagoo
- Vivek Lagoo (1953–2025) — actor and director; married to Reema Lagoo
  - Mrunmayee Lagoo — actress and theatre director; daughter of Reema and Vivek Lagoo

== M ==
=== Mahajani family ===
- Ravindra Mahajani — actor and director; popularly known as the "Vinod Khanna of Marathi cinema" for his personality and screen presence; married to Madhavi Mahajani
  - Gashmeer Mahajani — actor, choreographer and theatre director; son of Ravindra and Madhavi Mahajani
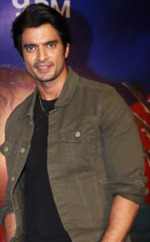
Gashmeer Mahajani

=== Mangeshkar–Kolhapure family ===
The Mangeshkars are primarily known as a musical family but have deep and direct connections to Marathi cinema through stage and playback work; the Kolhapure sisters, related to them by blood, are a prominent acting family further connected, through marriage, to the Kapoor family of Hindi cinema.

- Deenanath Mangeshkar (1900–1942) — actor and classical vocalist of Marathi musical theatre ("Master Dinanath"); produced three films in 1935
- Narmada ("Shrimati") — first wife of Deenanath Mangeshkar
  - Latika — daughter of Deenanath and Narmada; died in infancy
- Shevanti ("Sudhamati") — second wife of Deenanath Mangeshkar and sister of Narmada
  - Lata Mangeshkar (1929–2022) — legendary playback singer known as "Nightingale of India"; began her career as an actress in Marathi film, Pahilee Mangalagaur
  - Meena Khadikar — playback singer and composer
    - Yogesh Khadikar — recordist; son of Meena Khadikar; married to Mekhala Khadikar, a singer and daughter of classical vocalist Pandit Jitendra Abhisheki
  - Asha Bhosle (1933–2026) — playback singer and actress; sang her first film song for the Marathi film Majha Bal (1943)
  - Ganpatrao Bhosle — first husband of Asha
    - Hemant Bhosle (d.2015) — music director; eldest son of Ganpatrao and Asha Bhosle
      - Chaitanya "Chintu" Bhosle — musician and part of India's first and only boy band, "A Band of Boys"; son of Hemant Bhosle
    - Varsha Bhosle (d.2012) — columnist and singer; daughter of Ganpatrao and Asha Bhosle
    - Anand Bhosle — businessman and film-direction graduate; youngest son of Asha Bhosle, managed her career
      - Zanai Bhosle — singer and actress; daughter of Anand Bhosle
  - R. D. Burman — Hindi film music composer and singer
  - Usha Mangeshkar — playback singer
  - Hridaynath Mangeshkar — music composer and singer; scored numerous Marathi films including Jait Re Jait and Umbartha
- Half-sister (through Deenanath Mangeshkar's family line): mother of Pandharinath Kolhapure, linking the Mangeshkars to the Kolhapure family
- Pandharinath Kolhapure — classical vocalist and veena player; son of Pandit Krishnarao Kolhapure (an exponent of Natya Sangeet); his mother was the half-sister of Pandit Deenanath Mangeshkar, making his daughters nieces of Mangeshkar siblings
  - Shivangi Kolhapure — former actress; married to Hindi film actor Shakti Kapoor
    - Shraddha Kapoor — leading Hindi film actress; daughter of Shivangi Kolhapure and Shakti Kapoor
    - Siddhanth Kapoor — actor; son of Shivangi Kolhapure and Shakti Kapoor
  - Padmini Kolhapure — leading Hindi and Marathi actress and singer of the 1980s; married to producer Pradeep "Tutu" Sharma
    - Priyaank Sharma — actor/assistant director; son of Padmini Kolhapure
  - Tejaswini Kolhapure — actress and model; married to director-producer Pankaj Saraswat
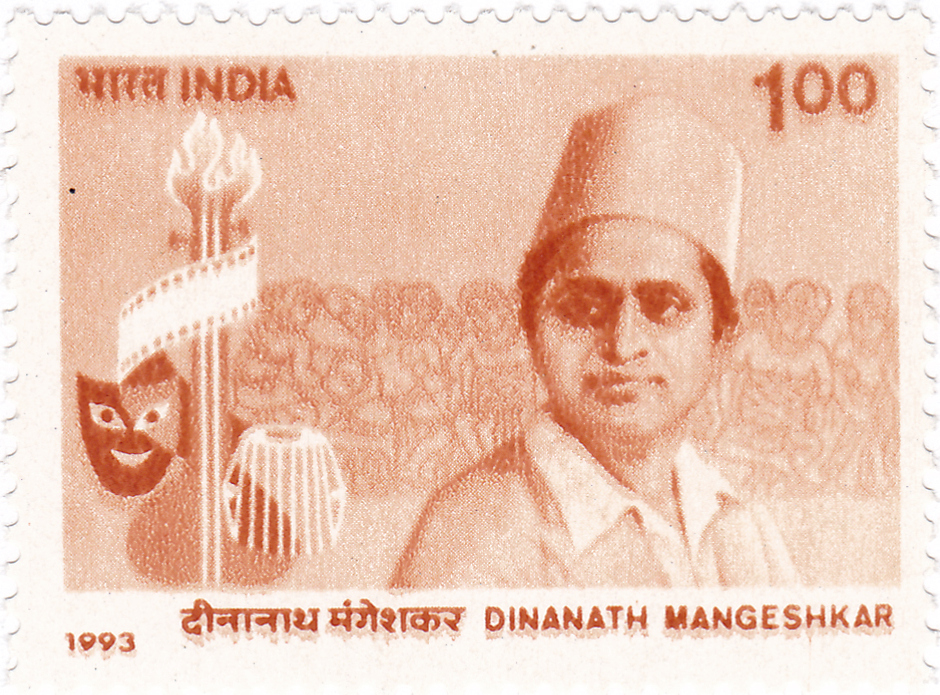
Deenanath Mangeshkar

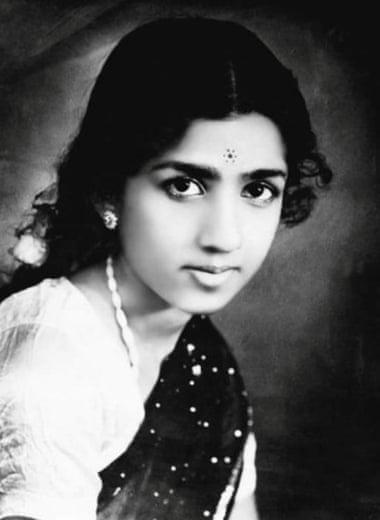
Lata Mangeshkar

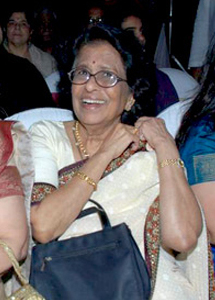
Meena Khadikar

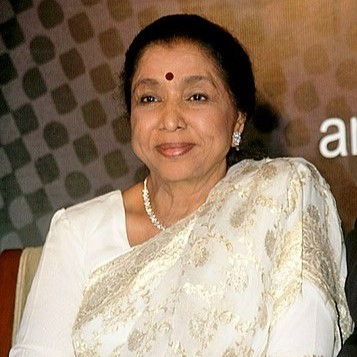
Asha Bhosle

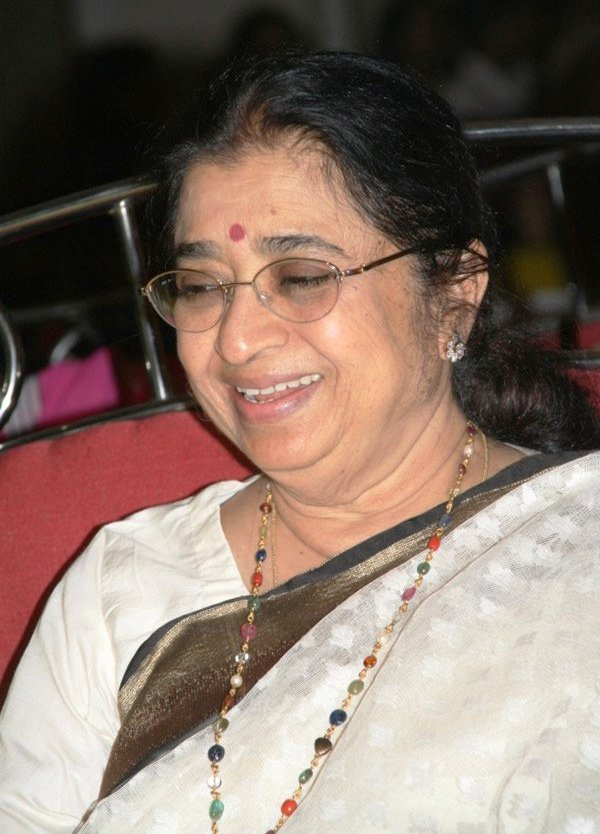
Usha Mangeshkar

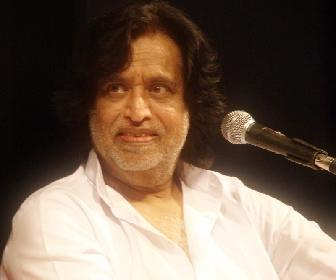
Hridaynath Mangeshkar

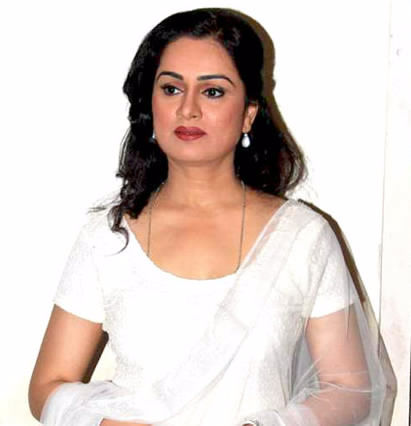
Padmini Kolhapure

=== Manjrekar family ===
- Mahesh Manjrekar — actor, director, producer and writer
  - Deepa Mehta — costume designer; first wife of Mahesh Manjrekar
    - Satya Manjrekar — child actor, assistant director and restaurateur; son of Mahesh and Deepa Mehta
    - Ashwami Manjrekar — producer and chef; daughter of Mahesh and Deepa Mehta
  - Medha Manjrekar — actress; prominently works in her husband's films; second wife of Mahesh Manjrekar
    - Saiee Manjrekar — Hindi and Telugu film actress; daughter of Mahesh and Medha Manjrekar
    - Gauri Ingawale — actress; daughter of Medha Manjrekar and step-daughter of Mahesh Manjrekar
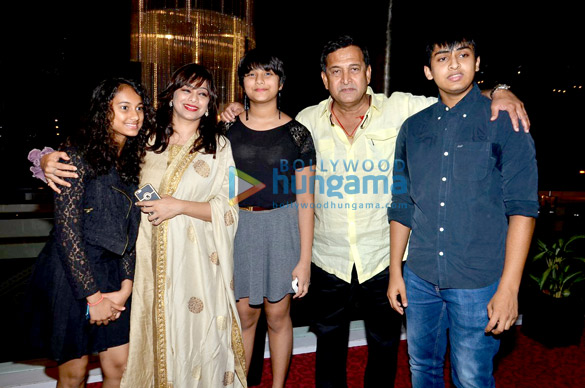
Manjrekar family

== P ==
=== Paranjpye family ===
- Shakuntala Paranjpye (1906–2000) — writer, actress, and social worker; recipient of the Padma Bhushan; daughter of mathematician and diplomat Sir Raghunath Purushottam Paranjpye
  - Sai Paranjpye — film director, screenwriter, and playwright; recipient of the Padma Bhushan; daughter of Shakuntala Paranjpye and Youra Sleptzoff; married to Arun Joglekar
    - Gautam Joglekar — director, actor, writer and cameraman; son of Sai Paranjpe and Arun Joglekar
    - Veeni Paranjape Joglekar — former actress and playback singer; daughter of Sai Paranjpe and Arun Joglekar
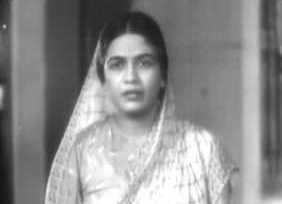
Shakuntala Paranjpye

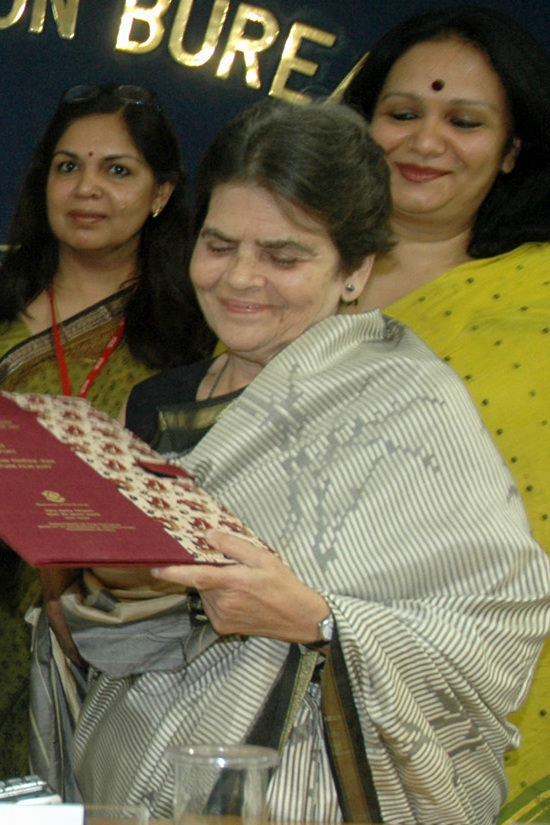
Sai Paranjpye

=== Pendharkar family ===
The Pendharkars of Kolhapur are one of the founding families of Marathi cinema, closely intermarried with the Karnataki and Shantaram families.

- Dr. Gopal Pendharkar and Radhabai — parents of Baburao and Bhalji Pendharkar; Radhabai's second marriage was to Damodar Karnataki, with whom she had Master Vinayak (see Karnataki family)
  - Baburao Pendharkar (1896–1967) — actor, director, producer and writer; helped establish the Maharashtra Film Company and later Prabhat Film Company; suggested the name "Prabhat"
  - Bhalji Pendharkar (1897–1994) — director, producer, screenwriter; made numerous historical Marathi epics on Maratha history
  - Leela Chandragiri ("Miss Leela") — actress and singer; first wife of Bhalji
    - Jayasingh — Leela Chandragiri's son from first husband
    - Madhavi Desai — writer; Leela Chandragiri's daughter from first husband; married to novelist Ranjit Desai
    - Saroj Chindarkar — Bhalji and Leela's daughter
    - Prabhakar Pendharkar (1933–2010) — Marathi writer and filmmaker; assisted his father and later V. Shantaram; directed the National Award–winning Bal Shivaji (1981); Bhalji's son from his other marriage
  - Master Vinayak — actor, director and producer; Baburao and Bhalji Pendharkar half-brother (see Karnataki family)
  - V. Shantaram — director, producer, actor; cousin of Baburao and Bhalji Pendharkar (see Shantaram family)

=== Pilgaonkar family ===
- Sharad Pilgaonkar — printing businessman and film producer; married to Sushila Pilgaonkar
  - Sachin Pilgaonkar — actor, director, producer and singer; part of the 1980s–90s Marathi comedy quartet
  - Supriya Pilgaonkar (née Sabnis) — actress; wife of Sachin
    - Shriya Pilgaonkar — actress; daughter of Sachin and Supriya Pilgaonkar
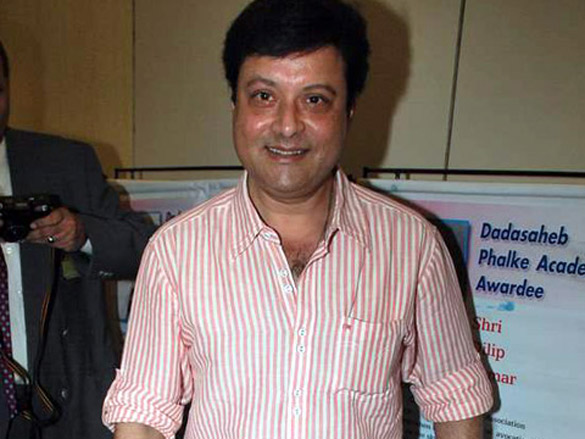
Sachin Pilgaonkar

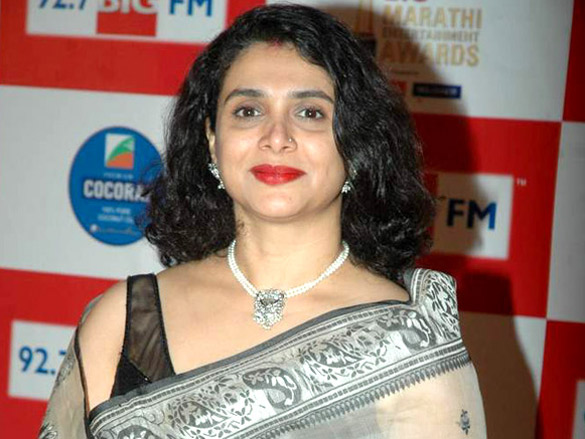
Supriya Pilgaonkar

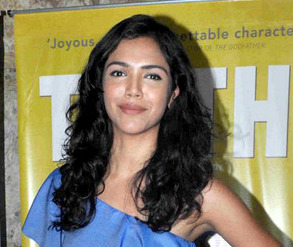
Shriya Pilgaonkar

== S ==
=== Samarth family ===
- Rattan Bai — actress and singer; known for portraying Jijabai in Swarajyachya Seemewar (1937)
  - Shobhna Samarth (née Saroj Shilotri) — actress and director; daughter of Rattan Bai
  - Kumarsen Samarth — director; husband of Shobhna Samarth
    - Nutan — actress; daughter of Shobhna and Kumarsen Samarth; married to Rajnish Bahl
      - Mohnish Bahl — son of Nutan and Rajnish Bahl; married to Aarti Bahl
        - Pranutan Bahl — actress; daughter of Mohnish and Aarti Bahl.
        - Krishaa Bahl — daughter of Mohnish and Aarti Bahl.
    - Tanuja — actress; daughter of Shobhna and Kumarsen Samarth; worked in Hindi, Bengali and Marathi films, including Gulchhadi (1984) and Pitruroon (2013); married to Shomu Mukherjee (see Mukherjee-Samarth family)
      - Kajol — actress; daughter of Tanuja and Shomu Mukherjee; married to Ajay Devgn (see Devgan family)
      - Tanishaa — actress; daughter of Tanuja and Shomu Mukherjee
    - Chatura — flight attendant; daughter of Shobhna and Kumarsen Samarth
    - Jaideep — producer and photographer; son of Shobhna and Kumarsen Samarth
  - Nalini Jaywant — actress; paternal cousin of Kumarsen Samarth
  - Vijaya Mehta (née Jaywant) — film and theatre director and actor; paternal cousin of Kumarsen Samarth and Nalini Jaywant (see Khote family above)

=== Shantaram family ===
V. Shantaram is one of the founding figures of Indian cinema, and his descendants remain active in Marathi film production to this day. The family is closely related to the Karnataki and Pendharkar families (see above).

- V. Shantaram (Shantaram Rajaram Vankudre; 1901–1990) — director, producer, actor; co-founder of Prabhat Film Company (1929) and founder of Rajkamal Kalamandir (1942)
  - Maternal cousin: Master Vinayak (see Karnataki family); this made his own cousin Baburao Pendharkar and Bhalji Pendharkar his relatives as well (see Pendharkar family)
  - With first wife Vimalabai:
    - Prabhat Kumar Shantaram — son, after whom Prabhat Film Company is said to have been named
    - Saroj — daughter; married to Soli Engineer (Grand Hotel, Mumbai and Valley View Grand Resort, Panhala)
    - Madhura — daughter; writer-filmmaker; married classical musician Pandit Jasraj
      - Shaarangdev Pandit — music composer; son of Madhura and Jasraj
      - Durga Jasraj — producer, singer, TV personality; daughter of Madhura and Jasraj
    - Charusheela — daughter
      - Siddharth Ray — actor; son of Charusheela
      - Shantipriya — actress; wife of Siddhant Ray
  - With second wife Jayashree:
    - Kiran Shantaram — director and producer; former Sheriff of Mumbai; directed Zunj (1975); produced Ashi Hi Banwa Banwi (1988) and Balache Baap Brahmachari (1989)
      - Two sons, and four granddaughters associated with the Indian film and content industry
    - Rajshree — actress (Geet Gaya Patharon Ne, Brahmachari); married American businessman Greg Chapman and moved to the US
    - Tejashree — actress
  - Third wife: Sandhya (née Vijaya Deshmukh) — actress, frequent leading lady in Shantaram's later films; no children with Shantaram (see Deshmukh family)
    - Grandchildren/descendants active in the industry include Rahul Shantaram (producer, Rajkamal Entertainment), Chaitanya Shantaram (producer), and Kadambari Desai (actress/TV personality)
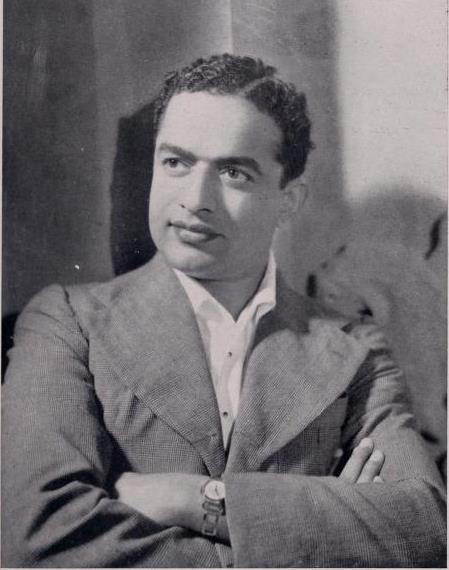
V. Shantaram

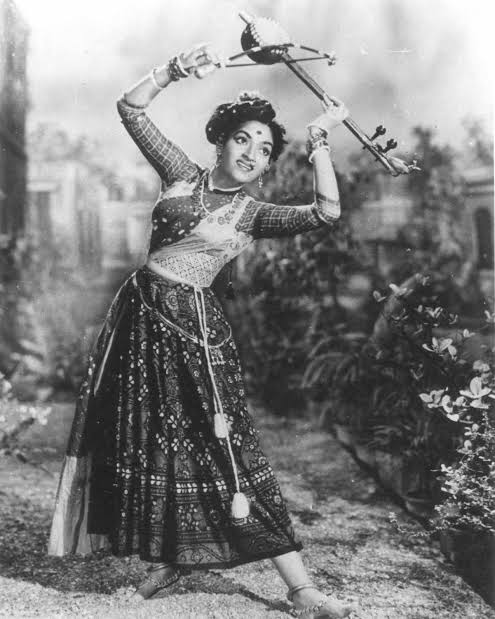
Sandhya Shantaram

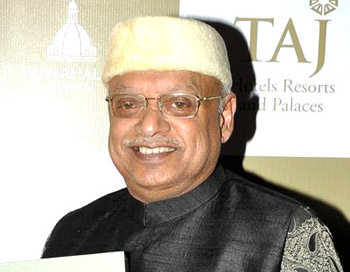
Kiran Shantaram

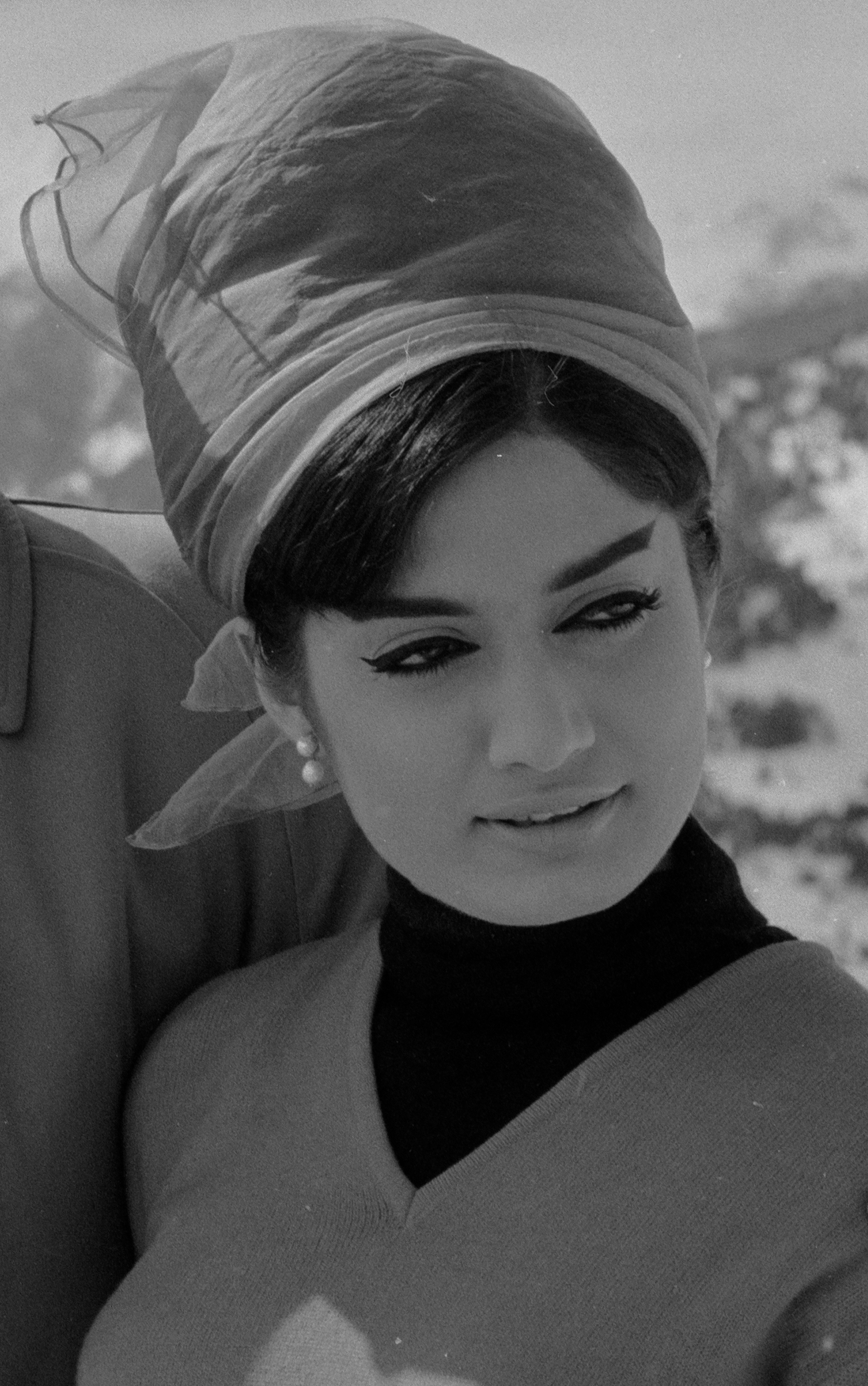
Rajshree

== T ==
=== Talwalkar family ===
- Smita Talwalkar (née Govilkar; 1954–2014) — actress, producer and director; founder of Asmita Chitra; two-time National Film Award winner; married to Avinash Talwalkar
  - Sulekha Talwalkar — actress, daughter-in-law of Smita Talwalkar; married to Amber Talwalkar, a key people of Talwalkars
  - Purnima Talwalkar — actress; daughter-in-law of Smita Talwalkar; married to Rohit Tawalkar, nephew of Smita Talwalkar
    - Pallavi Vaidya (née Bhave) — actress, sister of Purnima Talwalkar

=== Tendulkar family (of Vijay Tendulkar) ===
- Vijay Tendulkar (1928–2008) — playwright, screenwriter and journalist; Padma Bhushan recipient; married to Nirmala Tendulkar
  - Sushma Tendulkar (d. 2012) — theatre actress and social activist; daughter of Vijay and Nirmala Tendulkar; elder sister of Priya
  - Priya Tendulkar (1954–2002) — actress, social activist and writer; daughter of Vijay and Nirmala Tendulkar; married to actor-director Karan Razdan
  - Raja Tendulkar (d. 2001) — cinematographer; son of Vijay and Nirmala Tendulkar

== V ==
=== Varma family ===
- Amar Varma — writer known Aage Badho and Apradhi
- Manik Varma (née Dadarkar; 1926–1996) — Hindustani classical vocalist of the Kirana and Agra gharanas, also known for Marathi Natya Sangeet, Bhavgeet and Bhaktigeet; Padma Shri and Sangeet Natak Akademi Award recipient; married to Amar Varma
  - Bharati Achrekar — actress in Marathi and Hindi film, television and theatre; eldest daughter of Manik and Amar Varma
  - Aruna Jayprakash — physician; second daughter of Manik and Amar Varma
  - Vandana Gupte — actress and producer in Marathi stage and film; third daughter of Manik and Amar Varma
  - Rani Varma — singer, recordist and Marathi playback singer; youngest daughter of Manik and Amar Varma

== See also ==
- Marathi cinema
- List of Indian music families
- List of Hindi film families
- List of South Indian film families
