= Vikram Gokhale =

Indian actor (1945–2022)

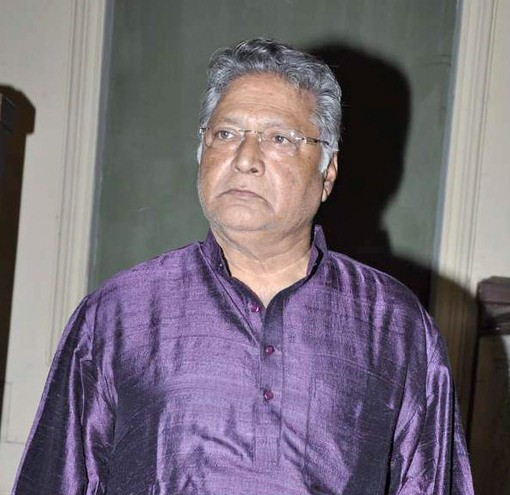
- Vikram Gokhale in 2013
- Born: 14 November 1945; Poona, Bombay Province, British India
- Died: 26 November 2022 (aged 77); Pune, Maharashtra, India
- Occupation: Actor
- Spouse: Vrushali Gokhale (m. 1975)
- Children: 2
- Father: Chandrakant Gokhale
- Family: Kamat–Gokhale family

Vikram Gokhale (14 November 1945 – 26 November 2022) was an Indian film, television and stage actor, noted for his roles in Marathi theatre, Hindi films and television. He was the son of the veteran Marathi theatre and film actor, Chandrakant Gokhale. He was the recipient of a National Film Award, two Maharashtra State Film Awards, four Filmfare Awards Marathi. In 2017, Gokhale was honoured with the V. Shantaram Lifetime Achievement Award, Maharashtra's highest award in the field of cinema.

Gokhale made his directorial debut in 2010, with the Marathi film Aaghaat. Produced by Sprint Arts Creation in 2013, he won the National Film Award for Best Actor category for his Marathi film Anumati. He also received Filmfare Award for Best Actor – Marathi for his film Bhingri.

== Early and personal life ==
Gokhale was born in Pune, Bombay Presidency on 14 November 1945. His great-grandmother, Durgabai Kamat, was the first female actor of the Indian screen, while his grandmother Kamlabai Gokhale (Kamlabai Kamat at that time) was the first female child actor of Indian cinema. His father Chandrakant Gokhale was a veteran Marathi film and stage artist and has acted in over 70 Marathi and Hindi films.

Gokhale married Vrushali in 1975 and they have two daughters, namely Aasavari and Neha. Vrushali is also an actress seen in few films and TV shows like Aaj Jhale Mukt Mi (1986, film), Aaghaat (2010, film) and Shwetambara (1983, TV show). Gokhale ran a real estate firm called Sujata Farms in Pune. He was also a social activist. His family's charitable foundation provides financial support for disabled soldiers, Children of lepers, and education of orphan children.

In February 2016, due to a throat ailment, Gokhale retired from stage activities, though he continued film work. He was admitted to Deenanath Mangeshkar Hospital on 5 November 2022 in Pune, where he died due to multiple organ failure on 26 November 2022, at the age of 77.

== Filmography ==
=== Films ===
Year	Title	Role	Language	Notes
1971	Parwana	Police Inspector	Hindi	
1971	Mai Mauli	Manohar	Marathi	
1973	Anolkhi	Ashok	Marathi	
1973	Varhadi Ani Vajantri	Prof. Govind	Marathi	
1974	Kartiki	Krishna	Marathi	
1975	Jyotibacha Navas	Arun	Marathi	
1977	Bala Gau Kashi Angai	Vasant	Marathi	
1977	Yehi Hai Zindagi	Lord Krishna	Hindi	
1977	Bhingri	Deepak	Marathi	
1978	Swarg Narak	Cinema Hall Manager	Hindi	
1979	Har Har Gange	King Bhagiratha	Hindi	
1979	Kanoon Ka Shikar	Kabir's Friend	Hindi	
1979	Aapo Jadro	Nobleman	Gujarati	
1979	Prem Bandhan	Unnamed	Hindi	Cameo appearance
1980	Bhalu	Fauzdar Khandekar	Marathi	
1980	Darodekhor	Shiva	Hindi	
1981	Jai Baba Amarnath	Baba Amarnath	Hindi	
1983	Sati Naag Kanya	Indrajeet Meghnath	Hindi	
1985	Vivek	Vivek	Hindi	
1985	Mahananda	Babulnath	Hindi	
1986	Aaj Jhale Mukt Mi	Raosaheb Jagirdar	Marathi	
1986	Bijli	Gana Patil	Marathi	
1986	Vikram Vetal	King Vikramaditya	Hindi	
1987	Insaaf	Inspector General of Police	Hindi	
1987	Parivaar	Pratap, Anita's father	Hindi	
1989	Eeshwar	Chaudhary Lalita's father-in-law	Hindi	
1989	Salim Langde Pe Mat Ro	Salim's father	Hindi	
1989	Elaan-E-Jung	Vijay Singh	Hindi	
1989	Kasam Vardi Ki	Minister Parshuram	Hindi	
1989	Kalat Nakalat	Manohar Desai	Marathi	
1989	Falak	Ramnath Verma	Hindi	
1990	Kroadh	Police Commissioner	Hindi	
1990	Agneepath	Commissioner M. S. Gaitonde	Hindi	
1990	Thodasa Roomani Ho Jaayen	Collector Jaideep Das Gupta	Hindi	
1990	Awwal Number	Home Minister Sadhu Singh	Hindi	
1990	Karishma Kali Kaa	Sadhu	Hindi	
1991	Maherchi Sadi	Yashwant	Marathi	
1991	Akayla	Doctor	Hindi	
1991	Dharam Sankat	Police Commissioner	Hindi	
1991	Sau Crore	Police Commissioner	Hindi	
1992	Balwaan	Police Inspector	Hindi	
1992	Ghar Jamai	Seth Dwaraka Prasad	Hindi	
1992	Qaid Mein Hai Bulbul	Raja Rai Bahadur	Hindi	
1992	Yaad Rakhegi Duniya	Doctor	Hindi	
1992	Adharm	Mr. Verma	Hindi	
1992	Khuda Gawah	Ranveer Singh	Hindi	
1993	Ghar Aaya Mera Pardesi	Kailash	Hindi	
1993	Lapandav	Adv. Mahashabde	Marathi	
1993	Zakhmo Ka Hisaab	Professor Adarsh Kumar	Hindi	
1993	Jaanam	Dhanraj	Hindi	
1994	Laadla	Doctor	Hindi	
1994	Jazbaat	Jagdish	Hindi	
1994	Mukta	Eknath Kanse Patil	Marathi	
1994	Vazir	Purushottam Kamble	Marathi	
1994	Maza Saubhagya	Gopal (Nanasaheb) Abhyankar	Marathi	
1994	Kunku	Shyam's Father	Marathi	
1995	Andolan	Pradhan	Hindi	
1995	Tadipaar	Mohinidevi's Mamaji	Hindi	
1998	Haste Hasate	PT Teacher	Hindi	
1998	Badmaash	Police Inspector	Hindi	
1998	Sham Ghansham	Satyadev Singh	Hindi	
1999	Hum Dil De Chuke Sanam	Pundit Darbar	Hindi	
1999	Rang Premacha	Prataprao Patil	Marathi	
2000	Champion	Police Commissioner	Hindi	
2000	Hey Ram	Maharaja	Hindi	
2000	Raju	Maharaj	Marathi	
2001	Yeh Raaste Hain Pyaar Ke	Pratap Verma, Rohit's father	Hindi	
2001	Tum Bin	Girdhari Shah	Hindi	
2001	Hadh: Life On the Edge of Death	Commissioner Shastri	Hindi	
2001	Aalavandhan/Abhay	Ranganath	Tamil/ Hindi	
2002	Kuch Tum Kaho Kuch Hum Kahein	Vishnu Pratap Singh	Hindi	
2003	Love at Times Square	Raj's father	Hindi	
2003	Kahan Ho Tum	Kapil Mehra	Hindi	
2003	Not Only Mrs. Raut	Judge	Marathi	
2004	Sau Jhooth Ek Sach	Vikrant Pradhan	Hindi	
2004	Madhoshi	Dr. Pradhan	Hindi	
2004	Hum Kaun Hai?	Virendra's boss	Hindi	
2004	Ishq Hai Tumse	Shankar Pandit	Hindi	
2004	Savarkhed Ek Gaon	Aamdar Patil	Marathi	
2005	Main Aisa Hi Hoon	Dayanath's advocate	Hindi	
2005	Lucky: No Time for Love	Ambassador Sekhri	Hindi	
2005	Kisna: The Warrior Poet	Dada Guru	Hindi	
2005	Aamhi Asu Ladke	Principal	Marathi	
2006	Gafla	Bhejnani	Hindi	
2006	Nital	Neeraja's Father	Marathi	
2006	Kadhi Achanak	Vishwas Sardesai	Marathi	
2007	Summer 2007	Wagh	Hindi	
2007	Bhool Bhulaiyaa	Acharya Yagyaprakash Bharti	Hindi	
2008	Rang Rasiya	Keshav Shastri	Hindi	
2008	Jawai Maaza Bhala	Avinash Ghatpande	Marathi	
2009	De Dana Dan	Paramjeet Singh Lamba	Hindi	
2009	Life Partner	Vijay Singh Jadeja	Hindi	
2009	Hum Phir Mile Na Mile	Pratap Singhal	Hindi	
2009	Kalavaramaye Madilo	Rao	Telugu	
2010	Mission 11 July	Police Commissioner Abbas Ali Baig	Hindi	
2010	Aaghaat	Dr. Khurana	Marathi	
2013	Anumati	Ratnakar	Marathi	National Film Award for Best Actor in a Leading Role
2013	Jai Maharashtra Dhaba Bhatinda	Prataprao Nimbalkar	Marathi	
2014	Dusari Goshta	Prasannajeet Shinde	Marathi	
2014	Aamhi Bolato Marathi	Vinayakrao Deshpande	Marathi	
2014	Bang Bang!	Narayanan	Hindi	
2015	Natsamrat	Rambhau	Marathi	Zee Chitra Gaurav Puraskar for Best Supporting Actor
2015	Nilkanth Master	Appa	Marathi	
2015	Take it Easy	Principal	Hindi	
2015	Shasan	–	Marathi	Cameo appearance
2015	Ab Tak Chhappan 2	Home Minister Janardhan Jagirdar	Hindi	
2016	Youth	Sudhakarrao Patil	Marathi	
2016	A Dot Com Mom	Sunil's father	Marathi	
2016	Traffic	Dr. Simon D'Souza	Hindi	
2016	702 Dixit's	Mr. Deshpande	Marathi	
2017	Khopa	Narayan's Grandfather	Marathi	
2017	Marathon Zindagi	Sushil's Supporter	Marathi	
2017	Bank Chor	Shashank Thakur	Hindi	
2018	Hichki	Mr. Khan	Hindi	
2018	Aiyaary	Gen. Pratap Malik, Chief of the Army Staff	Hindi	
2018	Me Shivaji Park	Judge Vikram Rajadhyaksha	Marathi	
2018	Whast Up Lagna	Daji Kaka	Marathi	
2018	Tula Pan Bashing Bandhaychay	Doctor	Marathi	
2019	Mission Mangal	Shrikant Bhosle, Director of ISRO	Hindi	
2020	Prawaas	Dr. Nene	Marathi	
2020	AB Aani CD	CD (Chandrakant Deshpande)	Marathi	
2021	Godavari	Naropant Deshmukh	Marathi	
2021	Tehreer	Judge	Hindi	Short film
2021	Sataad Ughadyaa Dolyaani	Dinkar Phatak	Marathi	TV series
2022	Nikamma	Retired Major	Hindi	
2022	Rashtra	Pratap Thakur	Marathi	
2022	Organic Dosti	Vikram Joshi	Hindi	Short film
2023	Phulrani	Brigadier Viraj Rajadhyaksha	Marathi	
2024	Sur Lagu De	Mohan Damle	Marathi	
2024	Adbhut	Mr. Khan	Hindi	
2026	Bewaras	Abaji	Marathi	Posthumous film

=== Plays ===
1. Khara Sangaycha Tar as Criminal Lawyer (based on The Witness for the Prosecution by Agatha Christie)
2. Katha as Shyamrao Lele
3. Ke Dil Abhi Bhara Nahi

=== Television ===
Year	Title	Role	Language	Channel
1983	Shwetambara	Prataprao	Marathi	Doordarshan
1985	Natkhat Narad	Mahavishnu	Hindi	Doordarshan
1989	Indradhanush	Professor	Hindi	Doordarshan
1989-91	Udaan	Brij Mohan	Hindi	Doordarshan
1992-93	Kshitij Ye Nahi	Akshay's father	Hindi	Doordarshan
1998	Alpviram	Mr. Munshi	Hindi	Sony Entertainment Television
2001	Chandan Ka Palna Resham Ki Dori	Jeetendra Bhimani	Hindi	Zee TV
2002-03	Shiv Mahapuran	Pandit	Hindi	
2002-05	Sanjivani	Kamal Chopra	Hindi	StarPlus
2005-2008	Ya Sukhanno Ya	Dada Adhikari	Marathi	Zee Marathi
2007-08	Virrudh	Dhirendra Raisinghania	Hindi	Sony Entertainment Television
2008-09	Jeevan Saathi	Vikramaditya Rathore	Hindi	Colors TV
2008-10	Agnihotra	Moreshwar (Morya) Vinayak Agnihotri	Marathi	Star Pravah
2010	Mera Naam Karegi Roshan	Thakur Veer Pratap Singh	Hindi	Zee TV
2013	Sinhasan	Host	Marathi	ABP Majha
2017	Balpan Dega Deva	Anna	Marathi	
2020	Avrodh: The Siege Within	Prime Minister of India (based on Narendra Modi)	Hindi	SonyLIV
2022	Tuzech Mi Geet Gaat Aahe	Pandit Mukund Narayan	Marathi	Star Pravah
	Junoon		Hindi	Doordarshan
	Akbar Birbal		Hindi	Zee TV
	Kuch Khoya Kuch Paya		Hindi	Doordarshan
	Dwidhaataa		Hindi	Zee TV

== Awards ==
- 1977: Filmfare Award for Best Actor - Marathi for the film Bhingri
- 1989: Maharashtra State Film Award for Best Actor for the film Kalat Nakalat
- 1993: Filmfare Award for Best Actor - Marathi for the film Vazir
- 2011: Sangeet Natak Akademi Award for acting in theatre.
- 2012: National Film Awards in Best Actor category at the 60th National Film Awards for the film Anumati (shared with Irrfan Khan; for film Paan Singh Tomar).
- 2015-17: Chitrabhushan Award by Akhil Bharatiya Marathi Chitrapat Mahamandal
- 2017: V. Shantaram Award by Government of Maharashtra.
- 2017: Filmfare Award for Best Supporting Actor – Marathi for the film Natsamrat.
