= Mohini Bhasmasur =

- Directed by: Dadasaheb Phalke
- Written by: Dadasaheb Phalke
- Produced by: Dadasaheb Phalke
- Starring: Kamlabai Gokhale; Durgabai Kamat
- Cinematography: Dadasaheb Phalke
- Distributed by: Dadasaheb Phalke
- Release date: November 1913
- Country: India
- Languages: Silent film Marathi intertitles

Mohini Bhasmasur is a 1913 Indian mythological film directed by Dadasaheb Phalke and starring Kamlabai Gokhale and Durgabai Kamat. It is India's and Phalke's second full-length feature film. Mohini Bhasmasur is the first Indian film to have a female actor. In Raja Harischandra, India's and Phalke's first film, the role of the female was played by Anna Salunke, a male.

== Plot ==
The plot of the film revolves round the theme of the Hindu mythological story of Mohini and Bhasmasur(a) ("ash-demon"), an asura (demon). The god Shiva grants Bhasmasura the power to turn anyone into ashes by touching their head. The demon decides to try the power on Shiva himself. Shiva runs terrified. The god Vishnu, witnessing the unfortunate turn of events, transforms into the seductress Mohini and enchants Bhasmasura. Bhasmasura asks her to marry him. Mohini agrees, but only on the condition that Bhasmasura follows her move for move in a dance. In the course of the dance, she places her hand on her head. Bhasmasura mimics the action, and in turn, reduces himself to ashes.

The film was of 3,255 feet (992 m) length.

== Cast ==
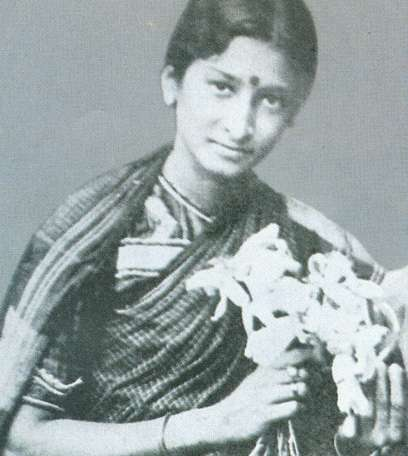
Kamlabai Gokhale who played the lead role as Mohini in the film Mohini Bhasmasur

Mohini Bhasmasur was the first Indian film to cast a female in the woman's role. Kamlabai Gokhale (1900–1998), then called as Kamla Kamat, a Marathi stage actress, was cast as the heroine Mohini and Durgabai Kamat her mother played the role of Parvati. Kamala was only 13 years old at the time. However, in an era where women in performing arts were compared to prostitutes, this did not set a trend and male actors continued to perform female roles in cinema for years.

== Production ==
Mohini Bhasmasur was the second feature film on a Hindu mythological theme in black and white of the silent movie era produced and directed by Dhundiraj Govind Phalke (1870–1944), popularly known as Dadasaheb Phalke. He was an Indian producer-director-screenwriter, costume-designer, editor, processor, printer, developer, projectionist and distributor all rolled in one, known as the father of Indian cinema, and his first film was Raja Harishchandra, which released on 3 May 1913. Soon after, Mohini Bhasmasur was screened for the first time in November 1913. A one-minute short comedy film Pithache Panje (Dough Claws) was released as a "side attraction" with the film.

Phalke produced four films in succession under the banner "Production Company" including Mohini Bhasmasur, Savitri Satyavan (1914), Satyavadi Raja Harishchandra (1917) and Lanka Dahan (1917). His wife Saraswati Phalke was the woman behind the scene who was the manager and technical assistant to her husband in film making. Phalke was inspired into film making after he watched the movie "Life of Christ" in 1910. This led him to London for training in filmography under Cecil Hepworth of Walton Studios, in 1912. He had bought the camera Williamson make for his film production, which he used for his first five Phalke Films. In creating the mythological themes for his films, Phalke was influenced by Raja Ravi Varma, the famous painter of mythological themes. He also introduced the screen play format for the film and rehearsed his actors before recording the scenes. Departing from "declamatory" style of Sanskrit drama (where mythological themes were prevalent), Phalke used nataka (folk theater) dividing the screenplay into acts. Most of Mohini Bhasmasur was shot in the open countryside. The scene where Bhasmasur keeps his hand on his head and reduces to ashes, Phalke shot with the actor and then retracted the film and shot some spoilt film being burnt in the actor's position, giving the effect of Bhasmasur burning.

Phalke's first three films were created in eight months together without a film studio, by hand-driven machines and using a crew who had no prior film experience. All three films were highly successful and Phalke was able to pay off his debts, which he had acquired to make the films. They were shown by Phalke in London, in 1914.

== First dance number ==
Kamala who was a stage actress performed the first dance number in the role of a heroine in Indian cinema. In the dance item, she played the role of Mohini enticing Bhasmasura, the demon or asura, with her seductive dancing to bring about his death. Phalke was the choreographer of the dance item and he had been inspired by Hindu temple sculptures, Buddhist murals in the Ajanta Caves, devadasi (temple-dancer) tradition and dancing (see Lavani) from the Tamasha folk form.
