= Avaghachi Sansar =

2006 Indian Marathi-language TV series

- Genre: Drama
- Written by: Rohini Ninawe; Vivek Apte
- Directed by: Mandar Devsthali
- Starring: See below
- Theme music composer: Devki Pandit
- Composer: Ashok Patki
- Country of origin: India
- Original language: Marathi
- No. of episodes: 1169

Production
- Producer: Shashank Solanki
- Camera setup: Multi-camera
- Running time: 22 minutes

Original release
- Network: Zee Marathi
- Release: 22 May 2006 – 24 April 2010

Avaghachi Sansar (transl. Only the world) is an Indian Marathi language television series premiered from 22 May 2006 which aired on Zee Marathi. It is the Zee Marathi's first longest running soap opera. Due to its popularity, the show reran on Zee Yuva from 24 August 2020.

== Cast ==
=== Main ===
- Prasad Oak as Harshwardhan Bhosale
- Amruta Subhash as Asawari Harshwardhan Bhosale / Asawari Raghunath Mohite

=== Recurring ===
- Kadambari Kadam / Gauri Nalawade as Antara Raghunath Mohite; Asawari's sister
- Suhita Thatte as Sudha Raghunath Mohite
- Vandana Sardesai-Waknis as Uma Dhananjay Mohite
- Sanjay Mone as Dhananjay Mohite; Raghunath's brother
- Vihang Nayak / Anand Abhyankar as Raghunath Mohite; School's principal
- Neha Joshi as Sanyogita Bhosale; Harsh's sister
- Dipti Devi / Samidha Guru as Neha Dhananjay Mohite; Asawari and Antara's sister
- Hemangi Kavi as Sakshi; Antara's friend
- Suruchi Adarkar as Harsh's office receptionist
- Neha Bam as Mrs. Gore
- Aadesh Bandekar as Mr. Mayekar
- Shriram Kolhatkar as Mr. Ghare; Bank Manager
- Sarika Nilatkar as Mrs. Lad
- Subodh Bhave as Raj Sharangpani
- Pankaj Vishnu as Sachin Mhatre; Asawari's fiance
- Arun Nalawade as Dhanaji Mane
- Dipti Ketkar as Sharada Raje
- Pushkar Shrotri
- Shweta Shinde
- Ashok Shinde
- Chinmay Mandlekar
- Avinash Narkar
- Ajay Purkar
- Uday Sabnis
- Aniket Kelkar
- Vidyadhar Joshi
- Sunil Godbole
- Manasi Magikar
- Kishor Mahabole

== Awards ==
Zee Marathi Utsav Natyancha Awards
| Year | Category | Recipient | Role |
|---|---|---|---|
| 2006 | Best Siblings | Amruta Subhash-Kadambari Kadam | Asawari-Antara |
| 2007 | Best Character Female | Amruta Subhash | Asawari Bhosale |
| 2007 | Best Father | Vihang Nayak | Raghunath Mohite |
| 2007 | Best Actor | Prasad Oak | Harshwardhan Bhosale |
| 2008 | Best Character Female | Amruta Subhash | Asawari Bhosale |
| 2008 | Best Supporting Character Male | Pankaj Vishnu | Sachin Mhatre |
| 2008 | Best Actor | Prasad Oak | Harshwardhan Bhosale |
| 2009 | Best Character Female | Amruta Subhash | Asawari Bhosale |

== Reception ==
| Week | Year | TAM TVR | Rank | | Ref. |
| Week | Year | TAM TVR | Mah/Goa | All India | Ref. |
|---|---|---|---|---|---|
| Week 45 | 2008 | 0.77 | 3 | 99 | |
| Week 47 | 2008 | 0.89 | 3 | 58 | |
| Week 50 | 2008 | 0.98 | 3 | 73 | |
| Week 1 | 2009 | 0.97 | 2 | 73 | |
| Week 3 | 2009 | 1.02 | 3 | 68 | |
| Week 5 | 2009 | 0.8 | 4 | 92 | |
| Week 6 | 2009 | 0.77 | 4 | 98 | |
| Week 15 | 2009 | 0.77 | 5 | 96 | |
| Week 16 | 2009 | 0.8 | 3 | 95 | |
| Week 18 | 2009 | 0.7 | 3 | 99 | |
| Week 19 | 2009 | 0.7 | 2 | 90 | |
| Week 22 | 2009 | 0.84 | 2 | 78 | |
| Week 28 | 2009 | 0.7 | 4 | 99 | |
| Wewk 40 | 2009 | 0.84 | 3 | 79 | |
| Week 50 | 2009 | 0.7 | 3 | 93 | |
| Week 52 | 2009 | 0.9 | 3 | 87 | |
| Week 1 | 2010 | 0.9 | 3 | 83 | |
| Week 11 | 2010 | 0.8 | 1 | 85 | |
| Week 16 | 2010 | 0.6 | 1 | 99 | |
