= Chandrakant Gokhale =

Indian actor (1921–2008)

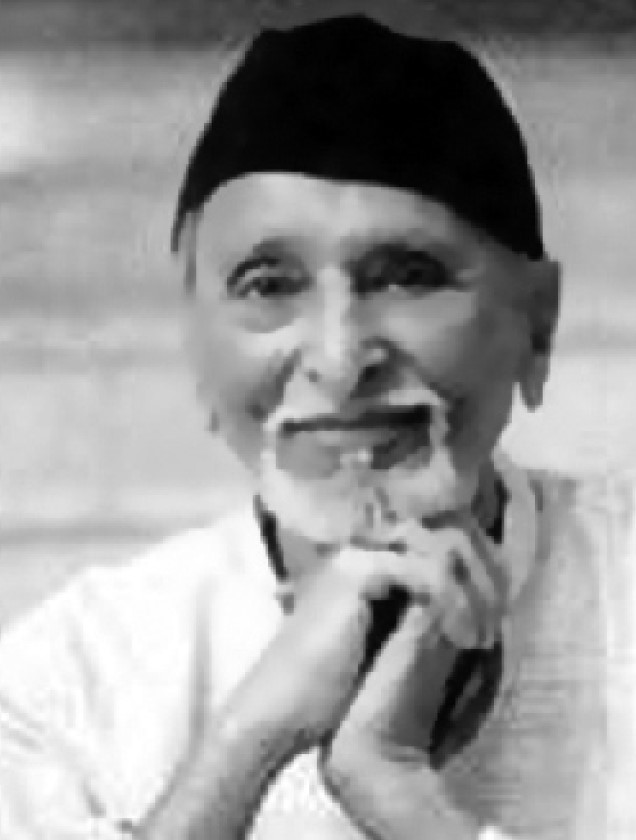
- Portrait of Gokhale
- Born: Chandrakant Raghunath Gokhale; 7 January 1921; Miraj, Bombay Presidency, British India
- Died: 20 June 2008 (aged 87); Pune, Maharashtra, India
- Spouse: Hemavati Gokhale (m. 1943)
- Children: Vikram Gokhale
- Parent: Kamlabai Gokhale (mother)
- Family: Kamat–Gokhale family

Chandrakant Raghunath Gokhale (7 January 1921 – 20 June 2008) was a veteran Marathi film and stage actor and singer. He is recipient of two Maharashtra State Film Awards. In 2001, Gokhale was honoured with the V. Shantaram Lifetime Achievement Award, Maharashtra's highest award in the field of cinema.

Gokhale's mother, Kamlabai Gokhale (nee Kamlabai Kamat) was the first female child actor of the Indian cinema. Gokhale acted in several superhit Marathi films, including Dhakti Jau. His son Vikram Gokhale was also involved with Marathi theatre and the Indian cinema.

== Early life ==
Chandrakant Gokhale was born on January 7, 1921, in Miraj, Bombay Presidency, where he also spent his childhood. He belonged to a family with a strong lineage in the performing arts, receiving his initial exposure to acting from his grandmother, Durgabai Kamat, and his mother, Kamlabai Gokhale. His family ran a theatre troupe named "Chittakarsh." Following the premature demise of his father, Kamlabai supported the family by performing in various touring theatre companies alongside her children. Due to the family's modest financial circumstances, Gokhale was unable to pursue formal schooling. However, his mother homeschooled him, teaching him how to read and write. Despite his lack of formal education, Gokhale later went on to serve as the headmaster of Primary School No. 1 in the Brahmanpuri locality of Miraj.

Gokhale began appearing in stage productions at the age of seven. He made his formal acting debut at the age of nine in the Marathi play Punha Hindu, initiating a career that would eventually span over seven decades and include appearances in more than sixty plays and sixty films. A significant turn in his early life occurred through his association with the maestro Deenanath Mangeshkar. Around 1937–38, Gokhale received training directly from Mangeshkar, learning approximately 70 to 80 traditional classical compositions (bandishes). Gokhale held Mangeshkar in high regard, viewing him as a paternal figure.

== Career ==
=== Theatre and Stage Performances ===
Gokhale began his stage career performing female roles, which was customary in traditional theatre, before transitioning to male characters. Over a career spanning roughly three quarters of a century, he performed in 64 plays, bringing to life characters written by prominent playwrights such as Annasaheb Kirloskar, Ram Ganesh Gadkari, Vinayak Damodar Savarkar, Mama Warerkar, Motiram Gajanan Rangnekar, Vishnupant Govind Damle, Pralhad Keshav Atre, Purushottam Laxman Deshpande, and Balakrishna Hari Kolhatkar. His notable theatrical credits included productions of Kulvadhu, Ranichi Baug, Sinhasan, and Zunjarrao.

He was cast in the title role of Raje Master in Shripad Narayan Pendse's play Raje Master (adapted from the novel Haddapar), a drama centering on the life of a schoolteacher. The production featured an ensemble cast including Sunita Deshpande, Dattatray Ramachandra Bhat, Sumati Gupte-Joglekar, Shrikant Moghe, and Madhu Kadam, though the play had a limited run.

Later, Gokhale played the character of Tatya in Jaywant Dalvi's play Barrister, portraying an antagonistic, unrefined, and predatory rustic character. Following Shreeram Lagoo's notable early run in Kusumagraj's Natsamrat, Gokhale stepped into the lead role of the elderly Appasaheb Belvalkar for a new staging of the production.

He also portrayed the character of Anna, an idealistic social worker and patriot, in Jaywant Dalvi's female-empowerment drama Purush. The complex role required him to depict a range of emotions, including civic pride following a national award and profound personal grief following an assault on his character's daughter.

=== Film and Television ===
In addition to his stage career, Gokhale made his cinematic debut in the 1938 film Laxmiche Khel. Over the course of his film career, he established himself as a prominent character actor, appearing in approximately 70 Marathi and 15 Hindi feature films.

His notable Marathi filmography included acclaimed performances in Maharani Yesubai, Dhakti Jaoo, Bhairavi, Manini, Mansala Pankh Astat, Suvasini, Sukhachi Savli, Swapna Tech Lochani, Dharmakanya, Irsha, Mukkam Post Dhebewadi, and Jivacha Sakha. In his later years, his career expanded into television, where he performed in both Hindi and Marathi broadcast serials.

== Filmography ==
Year	Film	Role	Notes
1948	Jeevacha Sakha		
1948	Do Kaliyaan		
1948	Balidaan		
1960	Bhervi		
1961	Suvasini		
1961	Sonyachi Paule		
1962	Jawai Maza Bhala		
1963	Pahu Re Kiti Vaat		
1964	Maratha Tituka Melvava	Dadoji Kondadeo	
1965	Sadhi Mansa		
1966	Love and Murder		
1967	Swapna Tech Lochani		
1968	Suhaag Raat	Pandit	
1968	Dharmakanya	Shivram Master	
1968	Annapurna		
1969	Mukkam Post Dhebewadi		
1971	Tithe Nandate Laxmi		
1971	Kunkwacha Karanda	Master Vamanrao Deo	
1973	Pyaasi Nadi		
1973	Aalay Tufan Daryala		
1974	Yashoda	Kaka	
1974	Raja Shiv Chhatrapati		
1974	Kartiki		
1978	Irsha		
1980	Mantryachi Sun		
1981	Ganimi Kawa	Aurangzeb	
1981	Devghar	Vaidya Bua	
1982	Savitrichi Sun	Narayan	
1983	Shwetambara	Bandu Kaka	
1986	Rao Saheb		
1986	Bijli	Janki's husband	
1987	Hiraasat	Narayan Rao	
1992	Angaar	Lawyer	
1992	Purush	Annasaheb Apte	
1995	Prem		
1996	Loafer	Oldster	
1996	Vishwasghaat	Rammohan Saxena	
1998	Yamraaj	Yamraaj's associate	
1998	Wajood	Malhar's father	
1999	Tuch Majhi Suhasini		
2002	Shakti: The Power		
2004	Saanjh		
2004	Girni		
2005	Dombivli Fast	Keshav Joshi	
2005	Ek Krantiveer: Vasudev Balwant Phadke	Balwant Phadke	
2005	Balirajache Rajya Yeu De		
2008	Valu	Aaja	
