= Aaghaat =

- Directed by: Vikram Gokhale
- Written by: Nitin Lavangare; Kshitij Patwardhan; Sameer Vidwans
- Produced by: Mohan Damle; Sanjay Sathaye; Shriram Dandekar
- Starring: Vikram Gokhale; Mukta Barve; Kadambari Kadam
- Cinematography: Bhavesh Rawal
- Distributed by: Saransh Distributors; Milind Lele
- Release date: 24 December 2010
- Running time: 130 minutes
- Language: Marathi

Aaghat is a 2010 Marathi-language film directed by veteran movie and stage actor Vikram Gokhale. Produced by Sprint Arts Creations Pvt. Ltd. and producers Mohan Damle, Sanjay Sathaye and Shriram Dandekar, the film is based on a story written by Nitin Lavangare. The cast of the film includes actors Vikram Gokhale, Mukta Barve, Kadambari Kadam and Amol Kolhe. The film was shot in Pune and was released in theatres on 24 December 2010.

The film deals with the bureaucratic structure in major private hospitals, the administration's approach towards patients and their relatives and ego issues of reputed medical practitioners.

== Plot ==
Sangeeta Pradhan (Kadambari Kadam), a 22-year-old girl who is about to be married in a month, has been admitted to a reputed private hospital in Pune, but is unwilling to sign the consent form. After talking to resident physician Dr. Smita Deshmukh (Mukta Barve) and psychiatrist Dr. Suren (Amol Kolhe), she is convinced to undergo an exploratory surgery on her ovaries. The surgery is to be performed by senior physician Dr. Khurana (Vikram Gokhale) who is also Dr. Smita's mentor. In the operating theater, Dr. Khurana appears distracted and asks Smita to perform the surgery. On first inspection by pathologist Dr. Kende (Arun Nalawade), one of the ovaries is diagnosed to have borderline malignant carcinoma, and no verdict is passed on the second ovary. Dr. Khurana orders Smita to remove both the ovaries, an order she refuses to comply with citing new research in medical journals. This enrages Dr. Khurana and he orders assistant Dr. Budhkar (Shashank Shende) to complete the surgery.

After the surgery, Smita writes a remark on the patient's file which gets her into trouble with the hospital administration, including the dean, Dr. Desai. Meanwhile, Dr. Khurana is shown getting drunk and misbehaving at his party and cheating on his wife with his muse Maya. After Smita discusses the case at a gynaecology conference, Dr. Khurana, using his influence with the administration, has her removed from service. Smita immediately files a request for an inquiry into why she is dismissed, threatening to go to court and involve the media if it is not complied with. The hospital and Dr. Khurana institute a committee that they believe will give a decision in their favour. Prior to the hearing, Dr. Khurana tries to coerce Dr. Budhkar, one of the witnesses, by making lucrative offers. On the first two days, the hearings proceed as per Dr. Khurana's plans, however, on the third day, Dr. Budhkar returns as a witness and recounts his earlier testimony, giving a true account to honor his friendship with Smita. Shortly after, Dr. Suren produces Dr. Deshpande, who used to work with Dr. Khurana in Mumbai and had been rusticated for uncovering Dr. Khurana's role in forced surgeries and the kidney racket. It is implied that the hearings end in Smita's favor, and Dr. Khurana is shown at home in distress.

== Cast ==
Vikram Gokhale	Dr. Khurana
Mukta Barve	Dr. Smita Deshmukh
Amol Kolhe	Dr. Suren Joshi
Kadambari Kadam	Sangeeta Pradhan
Aniket Vishwasrao	Amol
Vidyadhar Joshi	Modi
Suhas Joshi	Dr. Meera Desai
Shashank Shende	Dr. Vilas Budhkar
Smita Tambe	Mrs. Kalpana Budhkar
Manoj Joshi	Dr.Seth cum businessman
Kiran Kumar	Dr.Irani
Deepa Shriram	Dr.Rege
Surekha Kudachi	Maya
Kiran Karmarkar	Dr. Deshpande
Arun Nalavde	Dr.Konde
Anant Jog	Dr.Parikh
Vrushali Gokhale	Mrs. Khurana

== Reception ==
The film received positive reviews. Marathi Daily Loksatta described the movie as "touching the heart", and praised the performances of Mukta Barve and the directorial skill of Vikram Gokhale. The Maharashtra Times noted the film as a serious film in the year-end season of light-hearted Marathi and Bollywood films, and said that Vikram Gokhale had managed to maintain the sensitiveness of the topic while still making the film entertaining to watch. Despite appearing in the busy holiday season, the film was popular with the audiences.
