= Dharmakanya =

- Directed by: Madhav Shinde
- Screenplay by: Madhav Bhoite
- Story by: Pandit Mahadevshastri Joshi
- Produced by: Damayanti Shinde, Prakash Shinde, Dhanpal Gargate
- Starring: Anupama; Chandrakant Gokhale; Jayshree T.; Hansa Wadkar
- Cinematography: Vasant Shinde
- Edited by: Baburao Bhosale
- Music by: Hridaynath Mangeshkar
- Production company: Rajlaxmi Chitra
- Release date: 20 December 1968
- Running time: 108 minutes
- Country: India
- Language: Marathi

Dharmakanya is a 1968 Indian Marathi- language family drama directed by Madhav Shinde and produced by Rajlaxmi Chitra. The film stars Anupama, Chandrakant Gokhale, Jayshree T., Hansa Wadkar, Ratnamala, Dada Salvi in lead roles. At the 8th Maharashtra State Film Awards film won Maharashtra State Film Award for Best Third Film.

== Plot ==
Shivaram Bhatikar, along with his wife Parvati, their 17-18-year-old daughter Tungabhadra, and her five younger siblings, struggled to make ends meet. His meager salary barely provided enough for one meal a day.

One day, while Shivaram was eating khichdi, the children watched him hungrily. Tungabhadra managed to control her emotions at that moment but later worked hard to earn some money and cooked khichdi for her siblings. When Shivaram saw this, he became furious. Upset by his reaction, Tungabhadra decided to leave home.

Balajipant, a family friend or relative, convinced her to return. However, Shivaram arranged for her marriage to an older man. At the last moment, Tungabhadra’s uncle intervened, rescued her from the situation, and eventually found her a suitable match, ensuring her happiness.

== Cast ==
- Anupama as Tungabhadra (Tunga) Bhatikar
- Chandrakant Gokhale as Shivram Bhatikar
- Jayshree T. as Revati
- Hansa Wadkar as Parvati Bhatikar
- Ratnamala as Mavshi
- Shanta Tambe as Kaku
- Dada Salvi as Balajipant
- Rajshekhar as Lakoba
- Vasant Latkar
- Vasant Shinde

== Soundtrack ==
Dharmakanya

Soundtrack album by Hridaynath Mangeshkar
- Released: 1968
- Genre: Feature film soundtrack
- Length: 20:34
- Language: Marathi
- Label: Ultra Marathi

The movie soundtrack has 6 songs composed by Hridaynath Mangeshkar.

=== Track listing ===
No.	Title	Singer(s)	Length
1	"God Gojiri Laj Lajari"	Krishna Kalle, Usha Mangeshkar	3:34
2	"Nandalala Natuni Sajuni Aale"	Asha Bhosle	3:32
3	"Paithani Bilagun Mhanate Mala"	Asha Bhosle	3:33
4	"Purva Dishela"	Asha Bhosle	3:03
5	"Dev Nahi Jevlela"	Asha Bhosle	3:31
6	"Sakhi Ga Murali Mohan"	Asha Bhosle	3:34

== Awards ==
- Maharashtra State Film Award for Best Third Film.
- Maharashtra State Film Award for Best Director.
