= Kadambari Kadam =

Indian actress (born 1978)

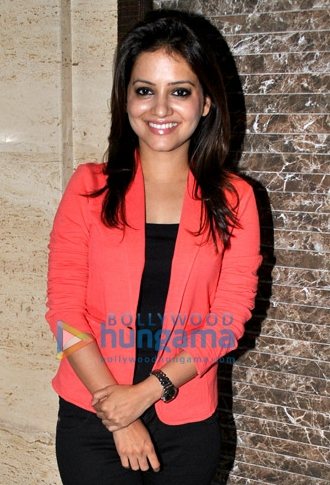
- Born: 13 October 1988 (age 37); Mumbai, Maharashtra, India
- Occupation: Actress
- Years active: 1991 – present
- Known for: Avaghachi Sansar; Tujvin Sakhya Re
- Spouse: Avinash Arun (m. 2016; div. 2025)
- Children: 1

Kadambari Kadam is an Indian actress who also works in television serials. She is known for her role in Avaghachi Sansar as Antara & Teen Bahuraaniyaan as Janki Desai. In 2011, She was playing the lead role in Tujvin Sakhya Re as Radhika. She currently stars in the Marathi Play Charchaughi.

== Early life and career ==
She was born on 13 October 1988 into a Maharashtrian family in Mumbai. Kadambari married cinematographer and director Avinash Arun on 10 November 2016. They had their first child, a son, on 2 May 2018 whom they named Kartik.

Her first stage appearance was at the age of 3. She completed her Schooling at Goregaon Vidyamandir, Mumbai. She always had a dream to be an actor. She has done serials like Kehta Hai Dil, Kabhi Sautan Kabhi Saheli, Teen Bahuraaniyaan and many more. Kadambari is known for her excellent comic timing.

== Filmography ==
=== Films ===
Year	Title	Role	Notes
2006	Hi Porgi Kunachi	Gauri Sawant	Lead debut
2008	Patla Tar Ghya	Aditi	
2009	Tula Shikvin Changlach Dhada	Makarand's gf	
2010	Aaghaat	Sangita Pradhan	Character role
2010	Kshanbhar Vishranti	Manasi	
2012	Ajinkya	Saee Dharmadhikari	Main lead
2013	Mangalashtak Once More	Reva	Character role
2019	The Silence	Mandakini	
2021	Bhumika	Bhumika	Lead
2023	Three of Us	Sarita Kamat	
2026	Krantijyoti Vidyalay Marathi Madhyam	Suman Bhoir	
2026	Premala Conditions Apply		

=== Television ===
Year	Title	Role	Channel	Notes
1999	Indradhanushya	Vandana	Alpha TV Marathi	Child actor
2001-2002	Kabhii Sautan Kabhii Sahelii		StarPlus	Junior role
2003	Kehta Hai Dil		StarPlus	Junior role
2005	Deep Stambh		DD Sahyadri	Cameo appearance
2005	Akalpit		Zee Marathi	Character role
2006	Hya Gojirwanya Gharat		ETV Marathi	Cameo appearance
2006-2007	Avaghachi Sansar	Antara Mohite	Zee Marathi	Main role
2007-2009	Teen Bahuraaniyaan	Janki Desai-Gheewala	Zee TV	Lead role
2009-2010	Maharashtracha Nach Baliye	Contestant	Star Pravah	Herself
2010-2011	Tujvin Sakhya Re	Radhika Pawar	Star Pravah	Lead role
2013	Sanskaar - Dharohar Apnon Ki	Bhoomi	Colors TV	Character role
2024	Lampan	Aai	SonyLIV	

=== Theatre ===
Year	Title	Role	Language
2022	Charchaughi	Vaiju	Marathi
