= Kamlabai Gokhale =

Indian actress (c. 1900–1997)

Kamalabai Gokhale
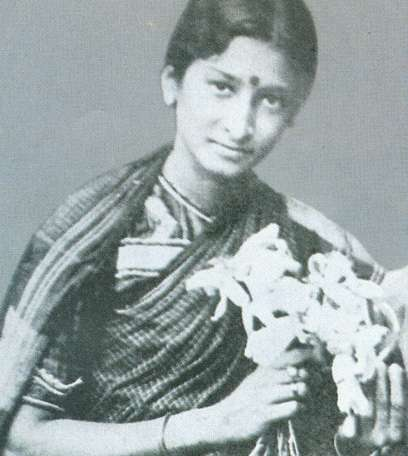
- Portrait of Gokhale
- Born: c. 1900; Bombay, Bombay Presidency, British India
- Died: 17 May 1997 (aged 96–97); Pune, Maharashtra, India
- Occupation: Actress
- Years active: 1913–1980
- Spouse: Raghunathrao Gokhale
- Children: 3, including Chandrakant Gokhale
- Parent: Durgabai Kamat (mother)
- Family: Kamat–Gokhale family

Kamlabai Gokhale (also known as Kamlabai Kamath; c. 1900 – 17 May 1997) was one of the first actresses in Indian cinema, along with her mother Durgabai Kamat.

== Personal life ==
Kamlabai was the daughter of Durgabai Kamat and Anand Nanoskar, a professor of history in Bombay. She married Raghunathrao Gokhale and had three children, Chandrakant Gokhale, Lalji Gokhale and Suryakant Gokhale. Chandrakant Gokhale is the father of Vikram Gokhale (occasionally credited as Vikram Gokhle), a well-known Indian film, television and stage actor. Lalji Gokhale and Suryakant Gokhale were acclaimed tabala maestros. Kamlabai was 25 when she became a widow, pregnant with her third child.

== Career ==
Her first stage appearance was at the age of four. Around 1912 or 1913, Dadasaheb Phalke, the pioneering film-maker of India, was casting for his film Mohini Bhasmasur and he chose Kamlabai for the lead. Her mother played the role of Parvati. Phalke had been forced to use a young male cook, Salunke, to play the female lead in his earlier film, Raja Harishchandra. By the time she was 15, Kamlabai had become a celebrity.

The following year she married Raghunathrao Gokhale. He had been with the Kirloskar Natak Company where he usually performed female roles. However, his voice was breaking, so he moved to his brother's company, which was the same one where Kamlabai and her mother were employed. The young couple was cast as the new lead pair of the company. In the 1930s, Kamlabai worked under Vinayak Damodar Savarkar in the play Ushaap, which focussed on the plight of Harijans. Kamalabai worked in around 35 movies. Her last film was Gehrayee (1980).

== Filmography ==
=== Silent Movies ===
| Year | Title | Role | Notes |
|---|---|---|---|
| 1913 | Mohini Bhasmasur | Mohini | |

=== Talkie Movies ===
| Year | Title | Role | Notes |
|---|---|---|---|
| 1931 | Devi Devayani Sharmistha | Miss Kamala | |
| 1932 | Sheil Bala | | |
| 1932 | Niti Vijay | | |
| 1932 | Char Chakram | | |
| 1932 | Bhutio Mahal | | |
| 1933 | Rajrani Meera | | |
| 1933 | Mirza Sahiban | | |
| 1933 | Lal-e-Yaman | Lalarukh | |
| 1933 | Krishna Sudama | | |
| 1933 | Chandrahasa | | |
| 1933 | Bhool Bhulaiyan | | |
| 1933 | Bhola Shikar | | |
| 1933 | Aurat Ka Dil | | |
| 1934 | Gunsundari | Sushila | |
| 1934 | Ambarish | | |
| 1934 | Afghan Abla | | |
| 1935 | Bikhare Moti | | |
| 1935 | Barrister’s Wife | | |
| 1936 | Prabhu Ka Pyara | | |
| 1936 | Be Kharab Jan | | |
| 1936 | Aakhri Galti | | |
| 1938 | Street Singer | | (as Miss Kamala) |
| 1938 | Chabukwali | | |
| 1939 | Garib Ka Lal | | |
| 1942 | Basant | | |
| 1944 | Stunt King | | |
| 1946 | Sona Chandi | | |
| 1946 | Haqdar | | |
| 1949 | Navajeevanam | Kamala | |
| 1952 | Aladdin Aur Jadui Chirag | | |
| 1954 | Nastik | Kamla | |
| 1962 | Private Detective | | |
| 1967 | Balyakalasakhi | | |
| 1971 | Hulchul | | |
| 1972 | Ek Nazar | | |
| 1980 | Gehrayee | | |

== Media portrayal ==
Kamlabai Gokhale (1991), a documentary about the veteran actor, won the National Film Award for Best Debut Non-Feature Film of a Director, awarded to Reena Mohan.
