= Durgabai Kamat =

Indian actress (born 1879)

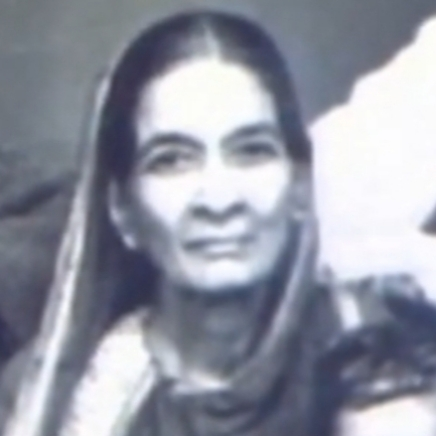
- Born: Durgabai Kamat; 1879; Bomby, Maharashtra, British Raj, British India
- Died: Unknown; Pune, Maharashtra, India
- Other name: The First Female Actress in Indian Cinema
- Occupations: Actress; singer; dancer; painter
- Years active: 1913–1950
- Spouse: Anand Nanoskar (m. 1899; div. 1903)
- Children: Kamlabai Gokhale (daughter)
- Family: Kamat–Gokhale family

Durgabai Kamat (1879 – unknown) was an Indian actress in Marathi films, who was the first actress in Indian cinema, when she acted in the film Mohini Bhasmasur in 1913. At that time working in films was not considered an appropriate profession for girls from respectable families.

== Early life ==
Kamat was born into a Gaud Saraswat Brahmin family. She was interested in arts from a very young age and her father was a renowned musician. Durga learnt to play musical instruments such as the veena, tabla and sitar. She could sing, dance and paint like most upper-caste families of that time, was very conservative. She studied until 7th standard and later married a history teacher, but it didn't last long. She made her acting debut onstage. She made history as the first female actor, while her daughter Kamlabai became the first child actress of Indian cinema. Her rather bold decision to raise her child single-handedly and to pursue a career in acting saw her being ostracised by her Brahmin community.

Durgabai Kamat first joined a travelling theatre company called Chittakarshak Natak Company and lived a nomad's life, with her daughter Kamlabai in tow. As they were on the go all the time, Durgabai also took it upon herself to home school her daughter. Around this time, she took up Dadasaheb Phalke on his offer to star in his next feature film, along with her daughter. Mohini Bhasmasur was a mythological black and white feature film, starring Kamlabai as Mohini and Durgabai as her mother, Parvati.

== Career ==
In the early 1900s, acting in film or theatre was a taboo for women, so much so Dadasaheb Phalke, the father of Indian cinema, had to use male actors for female roles in first Indian film, Raja Harishchandra. However, with its success, female actresses were encouraged. Thus, he introduced Kamat in his 1913 second movie Mohini Bhasmasur as a leading lady Parvati, while her daughter played the role of Mohini, thus becoming the first female child actress of Indian cinema. After Kamat, other actresses started working in cinema. In 1927, she acted in the film Babanchi Bayko directed by Narayanrao D. Sarpotdar, starring K. Ghaneker, Koregonkar Durgabai, Varne Pandurang and Gondhaleker. With the coming of sound in movies then in 1931 she acted in Gulami Janjir a social film, directed by Prafulla Chandra Ghosh and co-starred Takle, Rafiq Ghaznavi, Hyder Shah and Manohar Ghatwani.

== Personal life ==
Durgabai married Anand Nanoskar, a history teacher in Bombay but their marriage did not last long. Despite the societal taboos, they parted ways in 1903. After their separation, Durgabai went on to raise her then three-year-old daughter Kamlabai on her own. She was the maternal grandmother of veteran Marathi actor Chandrakant Gokhale, and the great-grandmother of actor Vikram Gokhale.

== Death ==
It is unknown where and when Kamat died. Her date of death has been mis-cited as 17 May 1997, which is instead her daughter Kamalabai Gokhale's date of passing. According to the documentary on her daughter's life which was shot in 1988, she was already deceased by then.

== Filmography ==
=== Silent Movies ===
Year	Title	Role	Notes
1913	Mohini Bhasmasur	Parvati	Debut
1927	Babanchi Bayko	Durgabai	Directed by Narayanrao D. Sarpotdar

=== Talkie Movies ===
Year	Title	Role	Notes
1931	Gulami Janjir	Renuka	Starred with Rafiq Ghaznavi
