= Exploratory surgery =

Surgery type

Exploratory surgery is surgery whose purpose is to look inside the body to help diagnose an ailment. Because surgery is an invasive and often risky intervention, it is typically only used when other methods such as external observation and testing body fluids have failed. Modern imaging techniques, starting with the invention of CT scans in 1972, have made it possible to look inside the body without surgery; these less-invasive techniques have significantly replaced exploratory surgery in humans. Exploratory surgery is still used for non-human animals, where tools for imaging are more expensive than exploratory surgery and often less available.

== Exploratory surgery in humans ==
As late as the early 1970s, when a patient presented to a hospital and reported severe pain for which there was no cause readily detectable from external observation or tests of body fluids, exploratory surgery was often the only way to make a definitive diagnosis while the patient was alive. This was highly risky. The patient could irreversibly decompensate from some undetected acute condition before the surgery could be initiated and completed, or the surgery might reveal no significant abnormalities. In a high percentage of cases, exploratory surgery was unable to provide a definitive answer, meaning the patient had endured great suffering for no net benefit.

Since the 1970s, exploratory surgery is used to make a diagnosis when typical imaging techniques fail to find an accurate diagnosis. The use of new technologies such as MRIs have made exploratory surgeries less frequent. For example, GE HealthCare reported in 2009 that in the United States, the number of laparotomies performed annually fell from 85,000 in 1993 to 35,000 in 2006, and the number of thoracotomies performed annually fell from 5,500 to 2,000 in 2006. Many kinds of exploratory surgeries can now be performed using endoscopy which uses a camera and minimal incisions instead of more invasive techniques.

The most common use of exploratory surgery in humans is in the abdomen, a laparotomy. If a camera is used, it's called a laparoscopy. A laparotomy can be used to diagnose cancer, endometriosis, gallstones, gastrointestinal perforation, appendicitis, diverticulitis, liver abscess, ectopic pregnancy, and other conditions involving abdominal organs. A biopsy can be performed during the procedure.

== Exploratory surgery in animals ==
Because animals cannot voice their symptoms as easily as humans, exploratory surgery is more common. Exploratory surgery is done when looking for a foreign object that may be lodged in the animal's body, when looking for cancer, or when looking for various other gastrointestinal problems. It is a fairly routine procedure that is done only after tests and bloodwork reveal nothing abnormal.
