= Prataprao =

Prataprao or Pratap Rao is a Marathi given name. Prataprao was also conferred as an Honorific Title where Pratap means 'act of bravery'; Rao is an honorific meaning raja. Notable people with the name include:

- Prataprao Gujar, 17th century Maratha military commander
- Prataprao Mallasarja Desai, 18th century ruler of Desai dynasty of Kittur.
- Prataprao Ganpatrao Jadhav, Indian politician
- Prataprao Govindrao Chikhalikar, Indian politician
