= Pre-existence of Christ =

Existence of Christ before his incarnation as Jesus

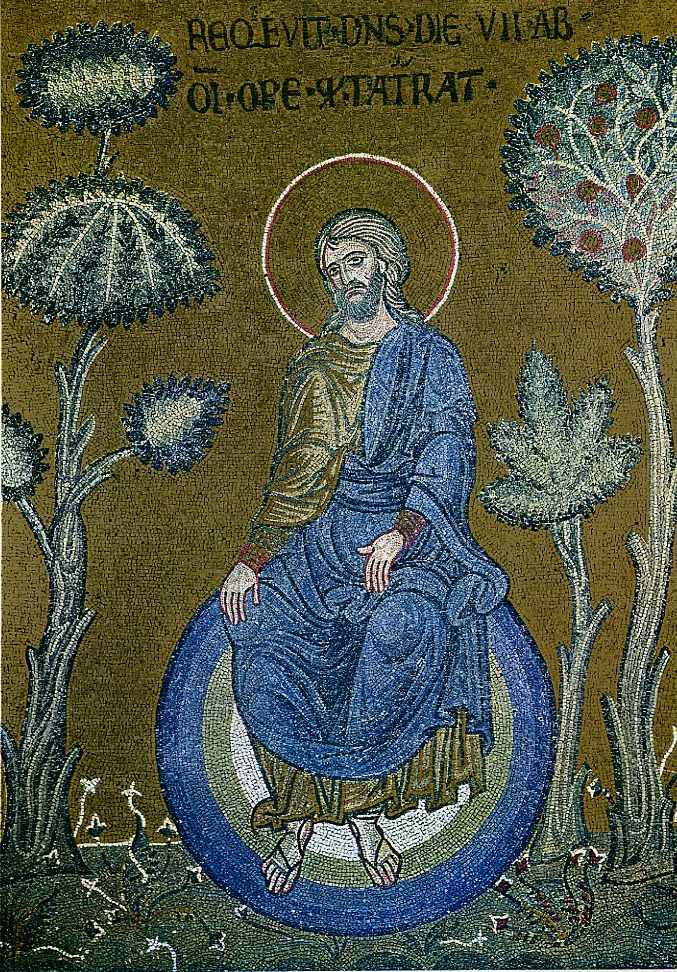
God resting after creation – Christ depicted as the creator of the world, Byzantine mosaic in Monreale, Sicily. Depictions of God the Father became prevalent only by the 15th century, and Jesus was often shown as a substitute before then.

The pre-existence of Christ asserts the existence of Christ prior to his incarnation as Jesus. One of the relevant Bible passages is John 1 (John 1:1–18) where, in the Trinitarian interpretation, Christ is identified with a pre-existent divine hypostasis (substantive reality) called the Logos (Koine Greek for "word" or "reason"). There are nontrinitarian views that question the aspect of personal pre-existence, the aspect of divinity, or both.

More particularly, John 1:15, 18 says:

John bore witness of Him and cried out, saying, “This was He of whom I said, ‘He who comes after me is preferred before me, for He was before me.’”...No one has seen God at any time. The only begotten Son, who is in the bosom of the Father, He has declared Him.

— John 1:15, 18

This doctrine is supported in John 17:5 when Jesus refers to the glory that he had with the Father "before the world existed" during the Farewell Discourse. John 17:24 also refers to the Father loving Jesus "before the foundation of the world". Passages in Revelation 21,6 in which Jesus refers to himself as the Alpha and Omega has been thought to refer to the pre-existence of Jesus. In the Pauline soteriology, 1 Corinthians 10,4;9Philippians 2:6–11, 2 Corinthians 8:9, Galatians 4:4 and 1 Corinthians 8:6 are passages that are seen as evidence that Paul believed in the pre-existence of Christ. However, the interpretation that these passages refer to the pre-existence of Christ has been disputed by a minority of scholars such as James Dunn.

The pre-existence of Christ is affirmed at the beginning of the Nicene Creed.

== Nicene Christianity ==
The pre-existence of Christ is a central tenet of mainstream Christianity. Most mainstream churches that accept the Nicene Creed consider the nature of Christ's pre-existence as the divine hypostasis called the Logos or Word, described in John 1:1–18, which begins:

In the beginning was the Word, and the Word was with God, and the Word was God. 2 He was in the beginning with God. 3 All things came into being through him, and without him not one thing came into being.

— John 1:1–3, NRSV

In Trinitarianism this "Logos" is also called God the Son or the second person of the Trinity. Theologian Bernard Ramm noted that "It has been standard teaching in historic Christology that the Logos, the Son, existed before the incarnation. That the Son so existed before the incarnation has been called the pre-existence of Christ."

Douglas McCready, in his analysis and defense of the pre-existence of Christ, notes that whereas the pre-existence of Christ "is taken for granted by most orthodox Christians, and has been since New Testament times", during the past century the doctrine has been increasingly questioned by less orthodox theologians and scholars.

James Dunn, in his book Christology in the Making, examines the development of this doctrine in early Christianity, noting that it is "beyond dispute" that in John 1:1–18, "the Word is pre-existent, and Christ is the pre-existent Word incarnate," but going on to explore possible sources for the concepts expressed there, such as the writings of Philo.

Some Protestant theologians believe that God the Son emptied himself of divine attributes in order to become human. Others reject this.

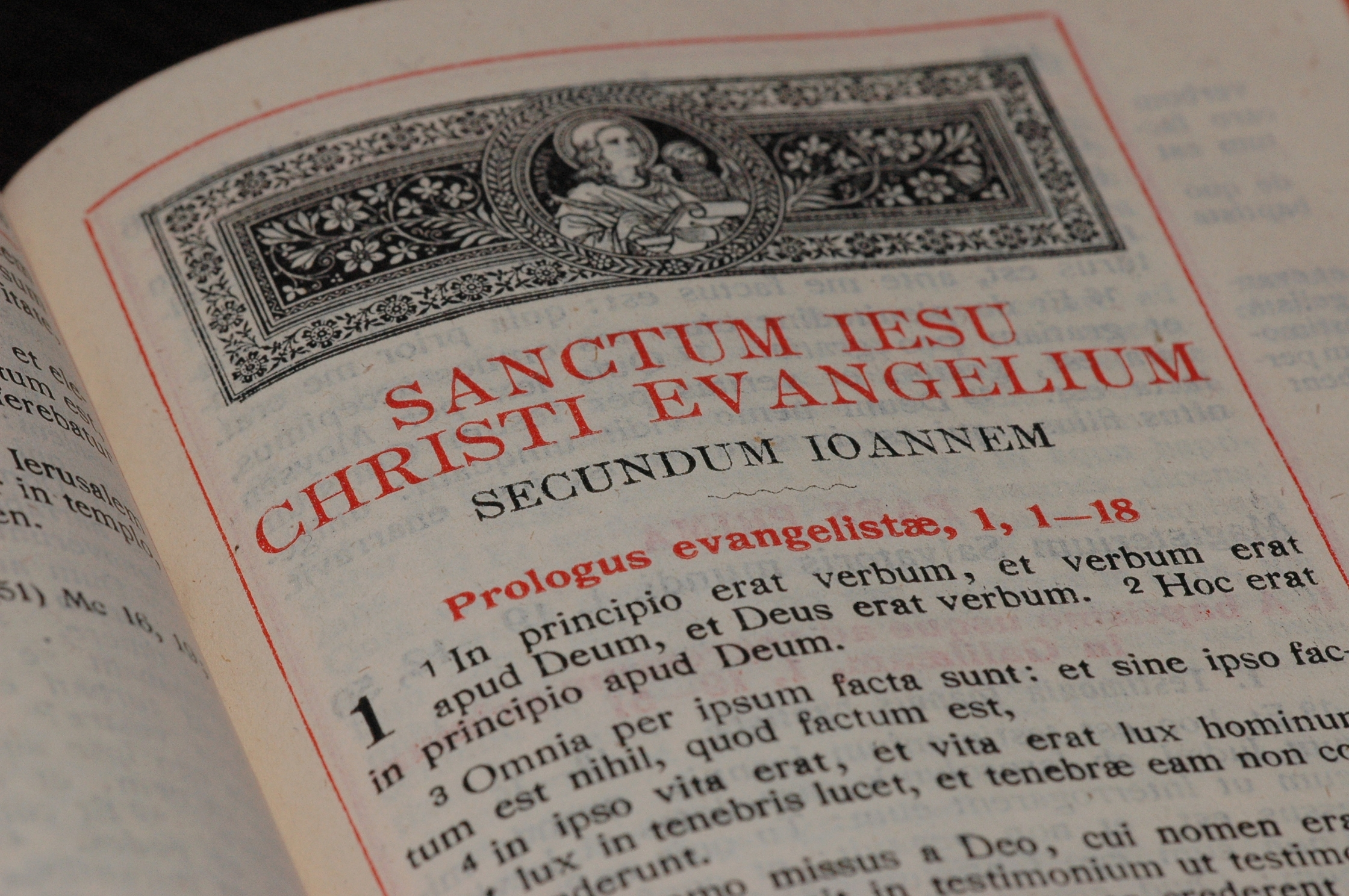
In principio erat verbum, Latin for In the beginning was the Word, from the Clementine Vulgate, Gospel of John, 1:1–18

Tertullian in Against Marcion Ch.21 sees a pre-existent appearance of Christ in the fiery furnace of one who is "like the son of man (for he was not yet really son of man)." The identification of specific appearances of Christ is increasingly common in evangelical literature from the 1990s onwards. For example, W. Terry Whalin states that the fourth person in the fiery furnace is Christ, and that "These appearances of Christ in the Old Testament are known as Theophanies or 'appearances of God' ".

=== Catholicism ===
According to the Catholic Church, Saint Augustine defined the Word as the eternal and perfect thought that God has of Himself, generated by the Father as a living and personal divine concept, which had no beginning and expresses God’s perfect self-knowledge. For Saint John Damascene, the Word is the perfect and revealing image of the Father, eternally generated without separation, just as light generates the ray, and through Him God created the world and revealed Himself to humanity. Saint Thomas Aquinas described the Word as the divine concept generated by God’s knowledge of Himself, generating a Person consubstantial with the Father, eternal and the agent of creation, through whom God acts and communicates.

According to Thomas Aquinas, "the human nature" of Christ was created and began in time, where "the subsistent subject" is both uncreated and eternal.

== Manichaeism ==
A clear idea of Christ's pre-existence is given in Manichaean thought, where he is conferred the name Jesus the Splendour. Considered a divine being, he was believed to have been the entity to lead Adam into eating from the Tree of Knowledge instead of the Devil (AKA Prince of Darkness) who, according to Manichaeism, actually wanted humanity to stay away from it so they would remain trapped in matter and never find gnosis. Likewise, Manichaeans associated Christ with the Tree of Life and saw him as a holy emanation of the Father of Greatness.

== Nontrinitarianism ==
Some accept the pre-existence of Christ without accepting his full divinity in the Trinitarian sense. For example, it is likely that Arius and most early advocates of Arianism accepted the pre-existence of Christ. However, Thomas Aquinas says that Arius "pretended that the Person of the Son of God is a creature, and less than the Father, so he maintained that He began to be, saying 'there was a time when He was not.'"

John Locke, William Ellery Channing, and Isaac Newton appear to have maintained belief in the pre-existence of Christ despite their rejection of the Trinity.

Today, several nontrinitarian denominations also share belief in some form of the pre-existence of Christ, including the Church of God (Seventh-Day) and the Jehovah's Witnesses, the latter group identifying Jesus as the archangel Michael, interpreting John 1:1 by translating with the phrase "a god," (or "the Word was divine" or a "godlike one") rather than "God". The Latter Day Saint movement teaches Christ's pre-existence as the first and greatest of the spirit children of God the Father.

Among the many churches which separated from the Worldwide Church of God, also referred to as the "Sabbatarian Churches of God" or, more pejoratively, Armstrongites, there is a shared belief in binitarianism, and that Jesus was the God of the Old Testament through whom God the Father created the world (based on Ephesians 3:9 and John 1:1–3), and that it was Jesus Christ who personally interacted with Adam and Eve, Noah, the patriarchs, ancient Israel, and the kings and prophets of the Old Testament. It is held that in his incarnation, Jesus was sent to reveal the Father who was previously unknown. This is based on an interpretation of John 5:37, Luke 10:22, and by the large number of references Jesus made about the Father in the New Testament compared to the very few, almost figural references to God as Father in the Old Testament. This belief is also based on an interpretation of verses where Christ is believed to be discussing his personal presence in the Old Testament and interaction with ancient Israel, and on a Christological interpretation of Melchizedek.

=== The Church of Jesus Christ of Latter-day Saints ===
Members of the Church of Jesus Christ of Latter-day Saints (LDS Church), the largest denomination in the Latter Day Saint movement, believe that Jesus Christ (and all people) was a pre-existent spirit who then gained a physical body at birth. In that regard, neither Christ nor the spirits of all humans were actually “created” (D&C 93:29). They believe the spirits of all humans are the literal offspring of God the Father (Acts 17:29; Hebrews 12:9) and that His being is a permanently joined spirit and physical body, the same as the post-ascension Christ (D&C 130:22). They believe Christ to be Jehovah of the Old Testament, who was in a spirit prior to birth by Mary (Ether 3:14-17). As the first fruits of the resurrection, through His divine redemption and resurrection, Christ will bring His followers into the same divine nature as He and His Father (2 Peter 1:3-4; Romans 8:29; 1 Corinthians 3:18; 4:4), to possess the same blessings and life they do. Church members refer to this as exaltation, the highest reward given to faithful followers of Christ (D&C 76:50-70, 94,95; 132:19). During the premortal grand council where in the presence of all of God's pre-existent children, the pre-existent Christ (God the Son) was chosen by God the Father to fulfill His role as the Savior and Redeemer of all God’s creations (Abraham 3:22-28).

Church members believe the appearance of God the Father and Jesus Christ to Joseph Smith in 1820 (known as the First Vision) affirmed this doctrine. In 1830, the LDS Church was founded with Smith as its president and prophet. Since that time, the church's prophets who succeeded Smith have taught and testified of Jesus Christ as the Son of God, His mission and role as Savior and Redeemer, including His pre-eminence and Godhood in pre-existence.

=== Oneness Pentecostals ===
Oneness Pentecostals are nontrinitarian Pentecostal Christians who do not accept the pre-existence of Christ as distinguished from God the Father, believing that, prior to the incarnation, only "the timeless Spirit of God (the Father)" existed. Afterwards God "simultaneously dwelt in heaven as a timeless Spirit, and inside of the Son of God on this earth." However, the United Pentecostal Church International, a large Oneness denomination, says in their statement of faith that "The one God existed as Father, Word, and Spirit" prior to the incarnation.

Although Oneness Pentecostals accept that "Christ is the same person as God," they also believe that "The 'Son' was 'born,' which means that he had a beginning." In other words, "Oneness adherents understand the term [Son] to be applicable to God only after the incarnation." They have consequently been described as holding an essentially unitarian position on the doctrine, and of denying the pre-existence of Christ. However, some members of the movement deny this interpretation of their beliefs.

== Denial of the doctrine ==
Throughout history there have been various groups and individuals believing that Jesus' existence began when he was conceived. Those who consider themselves Christians while denying the pre-existence of Christ can be broadly divided into two streams.

First, there are those who nevertheless accept the virgin birth. This includes Socinians, and early Unitarians such as Ferenc David, Jacobus Palaeologus, John Biddle, and Nathaniel Lardner. Today the view is primarily held by Christadelphians. These groups typically consider that Christ is prophesied and foreshadowed in the Old Testament, but did not exist prior to his birth.

Second, there are those who also deny the virgin birth. This includes Ebionites, and Unitarians, such as Symon Budny, Joseph Priestley, and Thomas Jefferson. This view is often described as adoptionism, and in the 19th century was also called psilanthropism. Samuel Taylor Coleridge described himself as having once been a psilanthropist, believing Jesus to be the "real son of Joseph." Friedrich Schleiermacher, sometimes called "the father of liberal theology", was one of many German theologians who departed from the idea of personal ontological pre-existence of Christ, teaching that "Christ was not God but was created as the ideal and perfect man whose sinlessness constituted his divinity." Similarly, Albrecht Ritschl rejected the pre-existence of Christ, asserting that Christ was the "Son of God" only in the sense that "God had revealed himself in Christ" and Christ "accomplished a religious and ethical work in us which only God could have done." Later, Rudolf Bultmann described the pre-existence of Christ as "not only irrational but utterly meaningless."

== In art ==
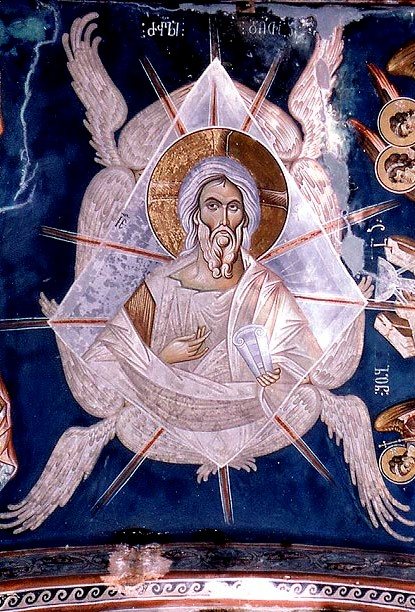
The Ancient of Days, a 14th-century fresco from Ubisi, Georgia

When the Trinity is depicted in art, the Logos is normally shown with the distinctive appearance, and cruciform halo that identifies Christ; in depictions of the Garden of Eden this looks forward to an incarnation yet to occur. In some Early Christian sarcophagi, the Logos is distinguished with a beard, "which allows him to appear ancient, even preexistent."

In Eastern Orthodox theology, the Old Testament title Ancient of Days, signifying God's eternal and uncreated nature, is commonly held to identify the pre-existence of God the Son. Most of the eastern Church Fathers who comment on the passage in Daniel (7:9-10, 13–14) interpreted the elderly figure as a prophetic revelation of the Son before his physical incarnation. As such, Eastern Christian art will sometimes portray Jesus Christ as an old man, the Ancient of Days, to show symbolically that he existed from all eternity, and sometimes as a young man, or wise baby, to portray him as he was incarnate. This iconography emerged in the 6th century, mostly in the Byzantine Empire with elderly images, although usually not properly or specifically identified as "the Ancient of Days."

== See also ==
- Christophany
- Logos (Christianity), a term in Western philosophy
- Trinity (Andrei Rublev)
- Eternal Buddha

== Bibliography ==
- Borgen, Peder. Early Christianity and Hellenistic Judaism. Edinburgh: T & T Clark Publishing. 1996.
- Brown, Raymond. An Introduction to the New Testament. New York: Doubleday. 1997.
- Dunn, J. D. G., Christology in the Making, London: SCM Press. 1989.
- Ferguson, Everett. Backgrounds in Early Christianity. Grand Rapids: Eerdmans Publishing. 1993.
- Greene, Colin J. D. Christology in Cultural Perspective: Marking Out the Horizons. Grand Rapids: InterVarsity Press. Eerdmans Publishing. 2003.
- Haight, R. Jesus Symbol of God. Maryknoll, NY: Orbis Books. 1999.
- Holt, Bradley P. Thirsty for God: A Brief History of Christian Spirituality. Minneapolis: Fortress Press. 2005.
- Letham, Robert. The Work of Christ. Downers Grove: InterVarsity Press. 1993.
- Macleod, Donald. The Person of Christ. Downers Grove: InterVarsity Press. 1998.
- McGrath, Alister. Historical Theology: An Introduction to the History of Christian Thought. Oxford: Blackwell Publishing. 1998.
- Macquarrie, J. Jesus Christ in Modern Thought. London: SCM Press. 1990.
- Norris, Richard A. Jr. The Christological Controversy. Philadelphia: Fortress Press. 1980.
- O'Collins, Gerald. Salvation for All: God's Other Peoples. Oxford: Oxford University Press. 2008.
- ——— Christology: A Biblical, Historical, and Systematic Study of Jesus. Oxford: Oxford University Press. 2009.
- Pelikan, Jaroslav. Development of Christian Doctrine: Some Historical Prolegomena. London: Yale University Press. 1969.
- ——— The Emergence of the Catholic Tradition (100–600). Chicago: University of Chicago Press. 1971.
- Tyson, John R. Invitation to Christian Spirituality: An Ecumenical Anthology. New York: Oxford University Press. 1999.
- Wilson, R. Mcl. Gnosis and the New Testament. Philadelphia: Fortress Press. 1968.
- Witherington, Ben III. The Jesus Quest: The Third Search for the Jew of Nazareth. Downers Grove: InterVarsity Press. 1995.

Pre-existence of Christ Life of Jesus
Preceded by Nothing	New Testament; Events	Succeeded by Genealogy of Jesus
