= Sacred lotus in religious art =

Attribute in certain Indian religions

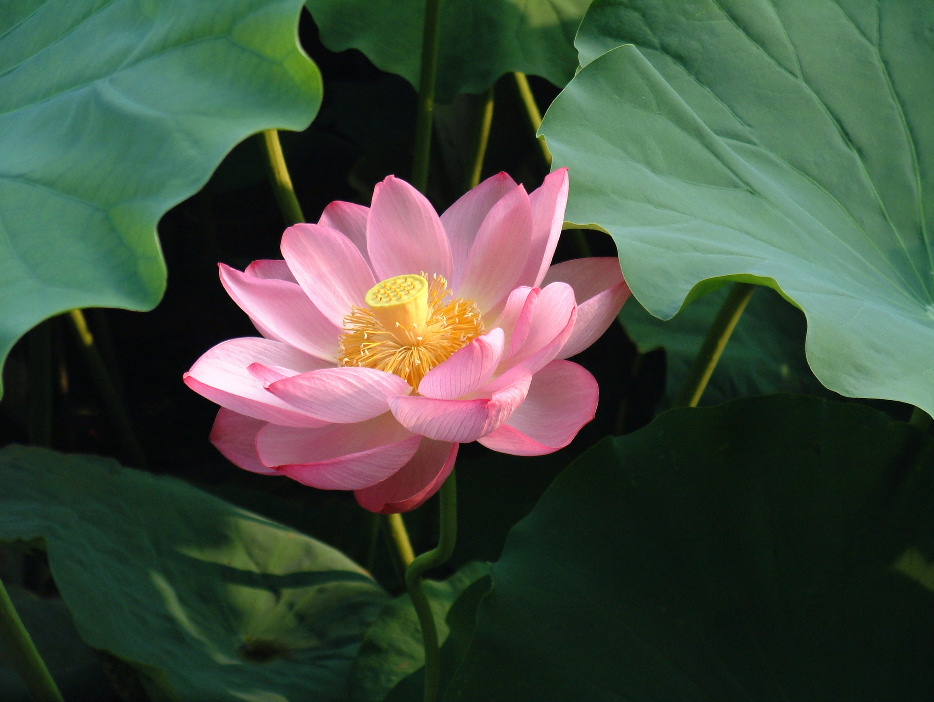
The lotus, Nelumbo nucifera

The lotus (Sanskrit: पद्म, romanized: Padmā), Nelumbo nucifera, is an aquatic plant that plays a central role in the art of Indian religions such as Hinduism, Buddhism, Sikhism and Jainism.

In Asian art, a lotus throne is a stylized lotus flower used as the seat or base for a figure. It is the normal pedestal for divine figures in Buddhist art and Hindu art and is often seen in Jain art and also in Sikh art. Originating in Indian art, it followed Indian religions to East Asia in particular.

== Hinduism ==
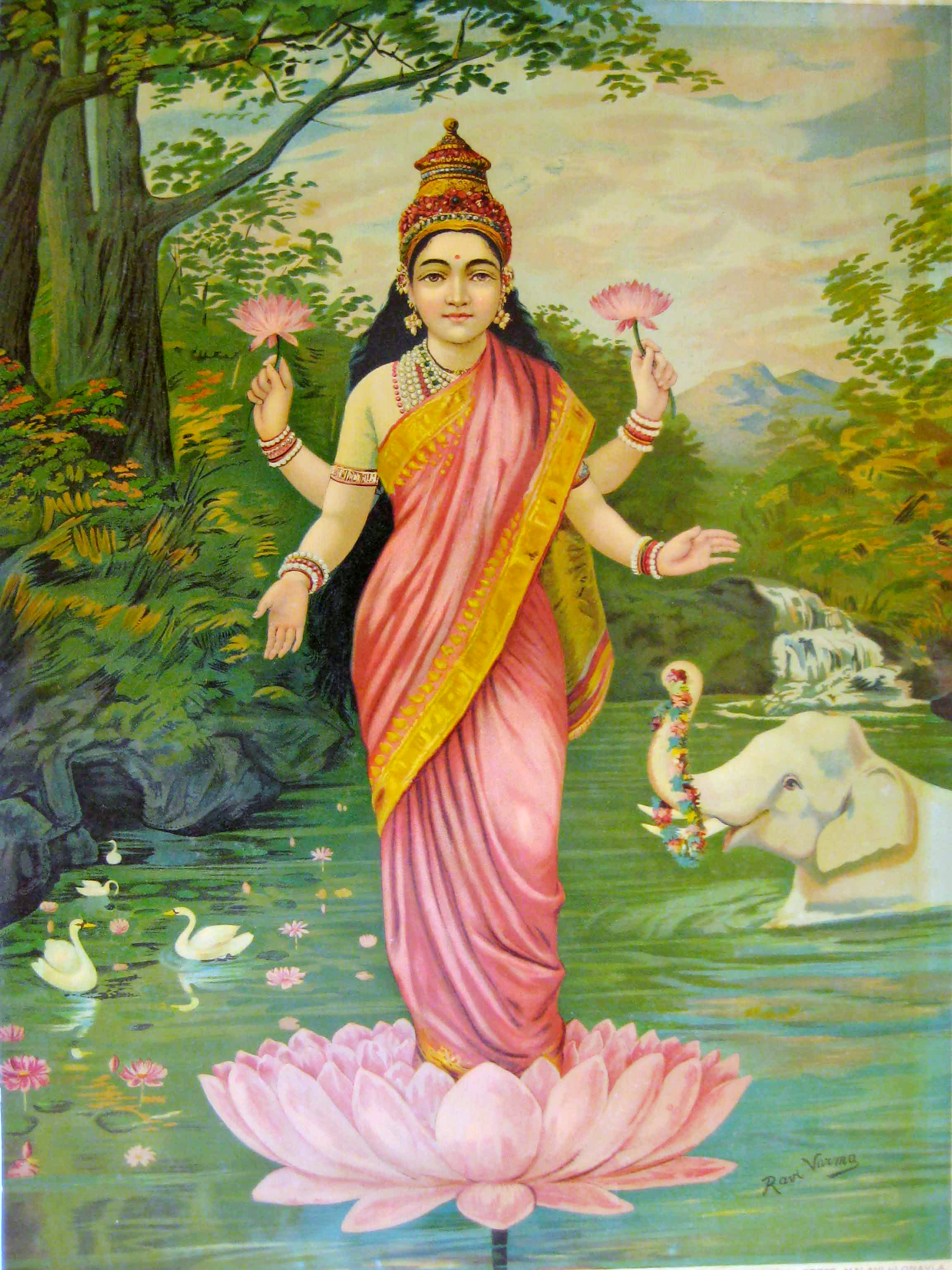
The Hindu goddess Lakshmi holding and standing on a lotus, Sri Lakshmi by Raja Ravi Varma

The Hindu divinities Vishnu and Lakshmi are often portrayed on a pink lotus in iconography; historically, many deities, namely Brahma, Saraswati, Lakshmi, and Kubera, usually sit on a stylized lotus throne. In the representation of Vishnu as Padmanabha (Lotus navel), a lotus issues from his navel with Brahma on it. The goddess Saraswati is portrayed on a white lotus. The lotus is the symbol of what is divine or immortal in humanity, and also symbolizes divine perfection. The lotus is the attribute of sun and fire gods. It symbolizes the realization of inner potential, and in Tantric and Yogic traditions, it symbolizes the potential of an individual to harness the flow of energy moving through the chakras (often depicted as wheel-like lotuses) flowering as the thousand-petaled lotus of enlightenment at the top of the skull.

Vishnu is often described as the "Lotus-Eyed One" (Pundarikaksha). The lotus's unfolding petals suggest the expansion of the soul. The growth of its pure beauty from the mud of its origin holds a benign spiritual promise. In Hindu iconography, other deities, like Ganga and Ganesha, are often depicted with lotus flowers as their seats.

The lotus plant is cited extensively within Puranic and Vedic literature, for example:

One who performs his duty without attachment, surrendering the results unto the Supreme Lord, is unaffected by sinful action, as the lotus is untouched by water.

— Bhagavad Gita 5.10:

== Buddhism ==
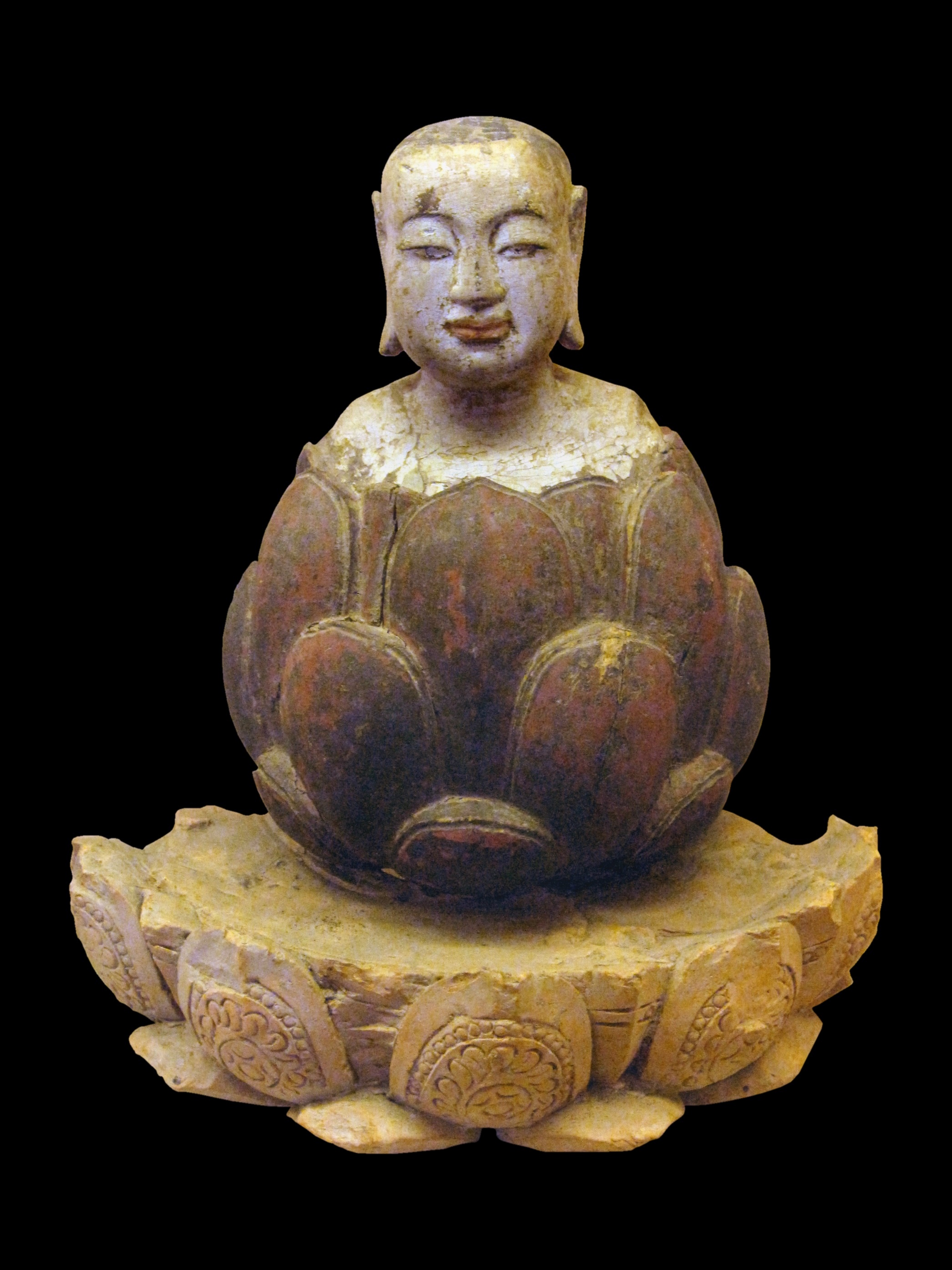
The boy Buddha appearing within a lotus. Crimson and gilded wood, Trần-Hồ dynasty, Vietnam, 14th–15th century

In the Aṅguttara Nikāya, the Buddha compares himself to a lotus (padma in Sanskrit, in Pali, paduma), saying that the lotus flower rises from the muddy water unstained, as he rises from this world, free from the defilements taught in the specific sutta.

In Buddhist symbolism, the lotus represents purity of the body, speech and mind, as if floating above the murky waters of material attachment and physical desire. According to the traditional biographies, Gautama Buddha's first seven steps made lotus flowers appear. Lotus thrones are the normal pedestal for most important figures in Buddhist art, and often that of other Indian religions.

In Tibet, Padmasambhava, the Lotus-Born, is considered the Second Buddha, having brought Buddhism to that country by conquering or converting local deities; he is normally depicted sitting on a lotus flower and holding a vajra and a skullcup. One account of his birth is that he appeared inside a lotus flower.

== Confucianism ==
In Chinese culture, Confucian scholar Zhou Dunyi (1017–1073) wrote (borrowing from Gautama Buddha's famous metaphor):

I love the lotus because while growing from mud, it is unstained.

Chinese: 予獨愛蓮之出淤泥而不染。

The lotus is the emblem of Macau and appears on its flag.

== Jainism ==
The founders (tirthankaras) of Jainism are portrayed seated or standing on lotus thrones. As his name suggests, the Jain tirthankara Padmaprabha is also represented by the symbol of a lotus. Padmaprabha means 'bright as a red lotus' in Sanskrit. It is said in Śvetāmbara sources that his mother had a fancy for a couch of red lotuses – padma – while he was in her womb.

== Manichaeism ==
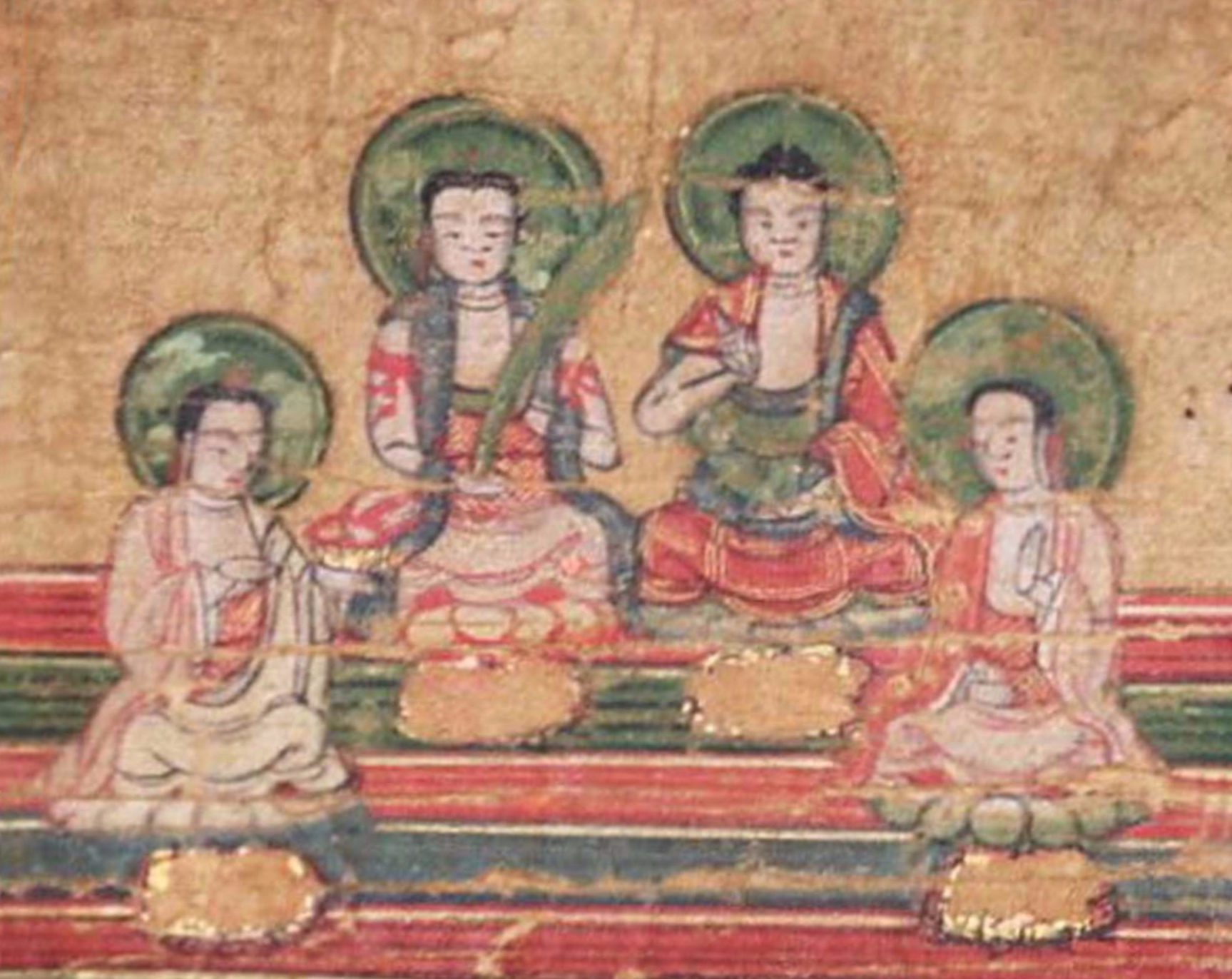
From left-to-right, Mani, Zarathustra, Shakyamuni, and Jesus depicted seated atop lotus flowers.

Chinese Manichaeism borrowed the iconography of Chinese Buddhism, frequently depicting religious figures revered in Manichaeism seated upon lotus thrones in its religious art.

== Christianity ==
Since the introduction of Christianity to India, the iconography of the Saint Thomas Christians has depicted the Saint Thomas Christian cross, also called the Persian cross, resting on a lotus throne, a stylised lotus flower. Likewise, following the introduction of Christianity to China by the Church of the East, the Nestorian cross was frequently depicted on a lotus flower in Chinese Christian iconography.

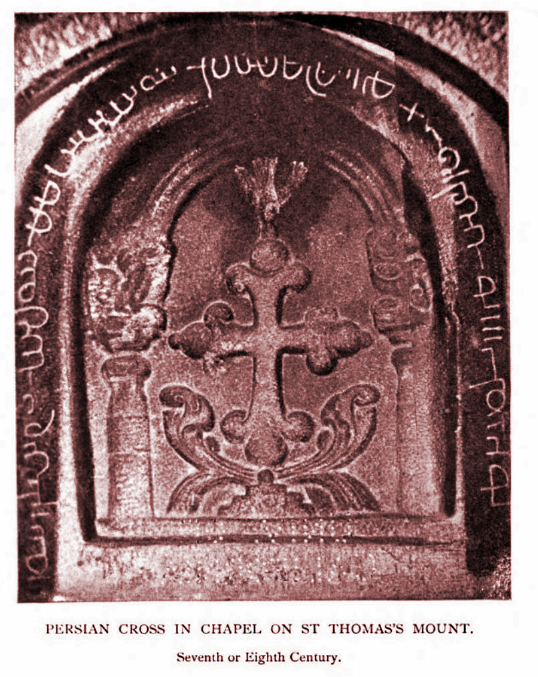
Persian cross atop a lotus flower from St Thomas mount, Chennai, Tamil Nadu, India

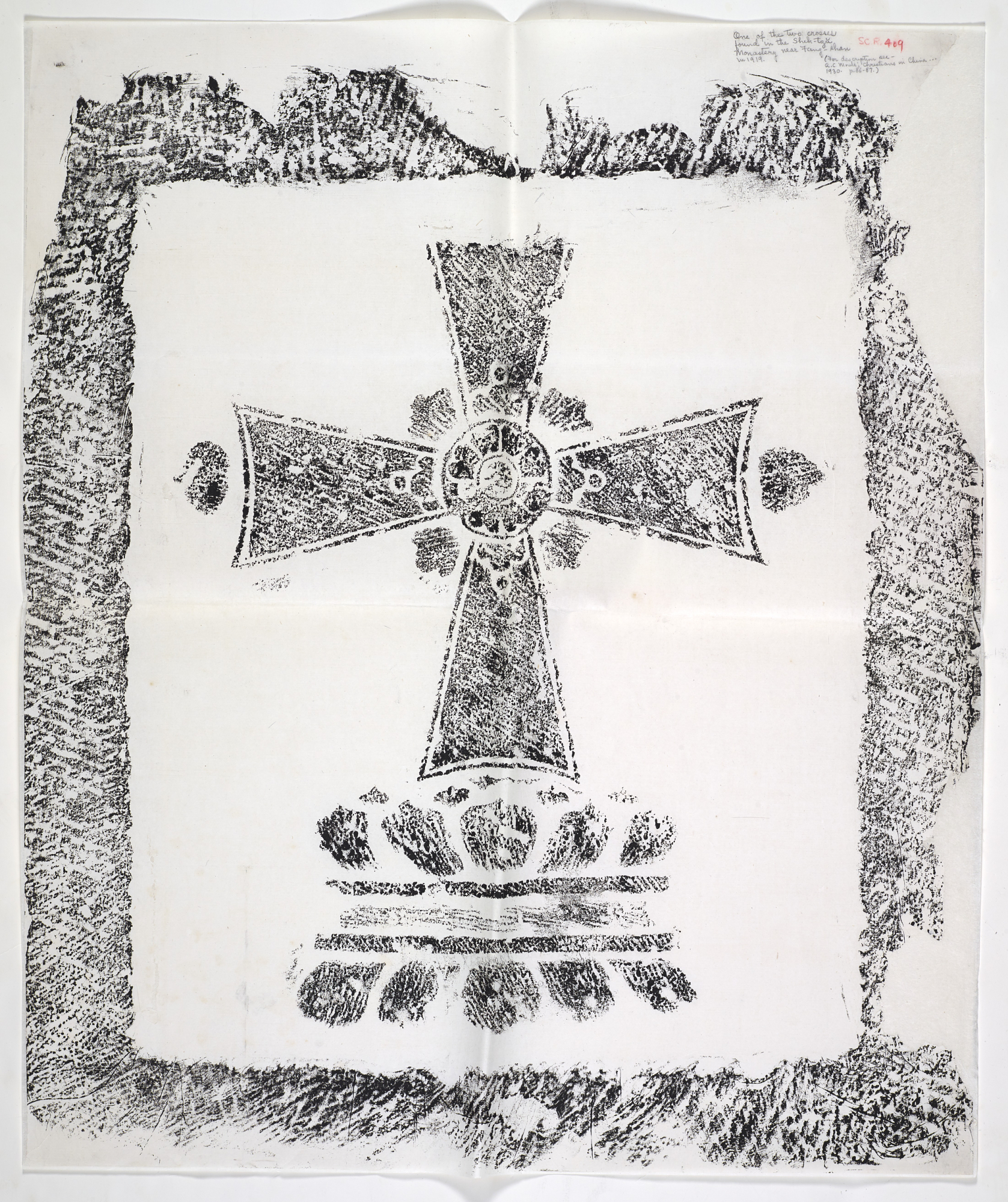
Rubbing of a Nestorian cross at the Temple of the Cross in Fang-shan district, about 30 miles south-west of Beijing, China

== Baháʼí Faith ==
The international Baháʼí Faith community adopted the symbolism of the lotus in the design of the Lotus Temple in New Delhi, India.

== Cultural ==
In the classical written and oral literature of many Asian cultures the lotus is present in figurative form, representing elegance, beauty, perfection, purity and grace, being often used in poems and songs as an allegory for ideal feminine attributes. In Sanskrit the word lotus (पद्म padma) has many synonyms: since the lotus thrives on water, ja (denoting birth) is added to words for water to derive synonyms for lotus, like rajiva, ambuja (ambu (water) + ja (born of)), neeraja (neera (water) + ja (born of)), pankaja (panka (mud) + ja(born of)), kamala, kunala, aravinda, nalini and saroja and names derived from the lotus, like padmavati (possessing lotuses) or padmini (full of lotuses). These names and derived versions are often used to name girls, and to a lesser extent boys, throughout South and Southeast Asia.

The lotus flower is the state flower of several Indian states, including Karnataka, Haryana, and Andhra Pradesh. The lotus flower is the election symbol of the Bharatiya Janata Party, one of the major political parties in India.

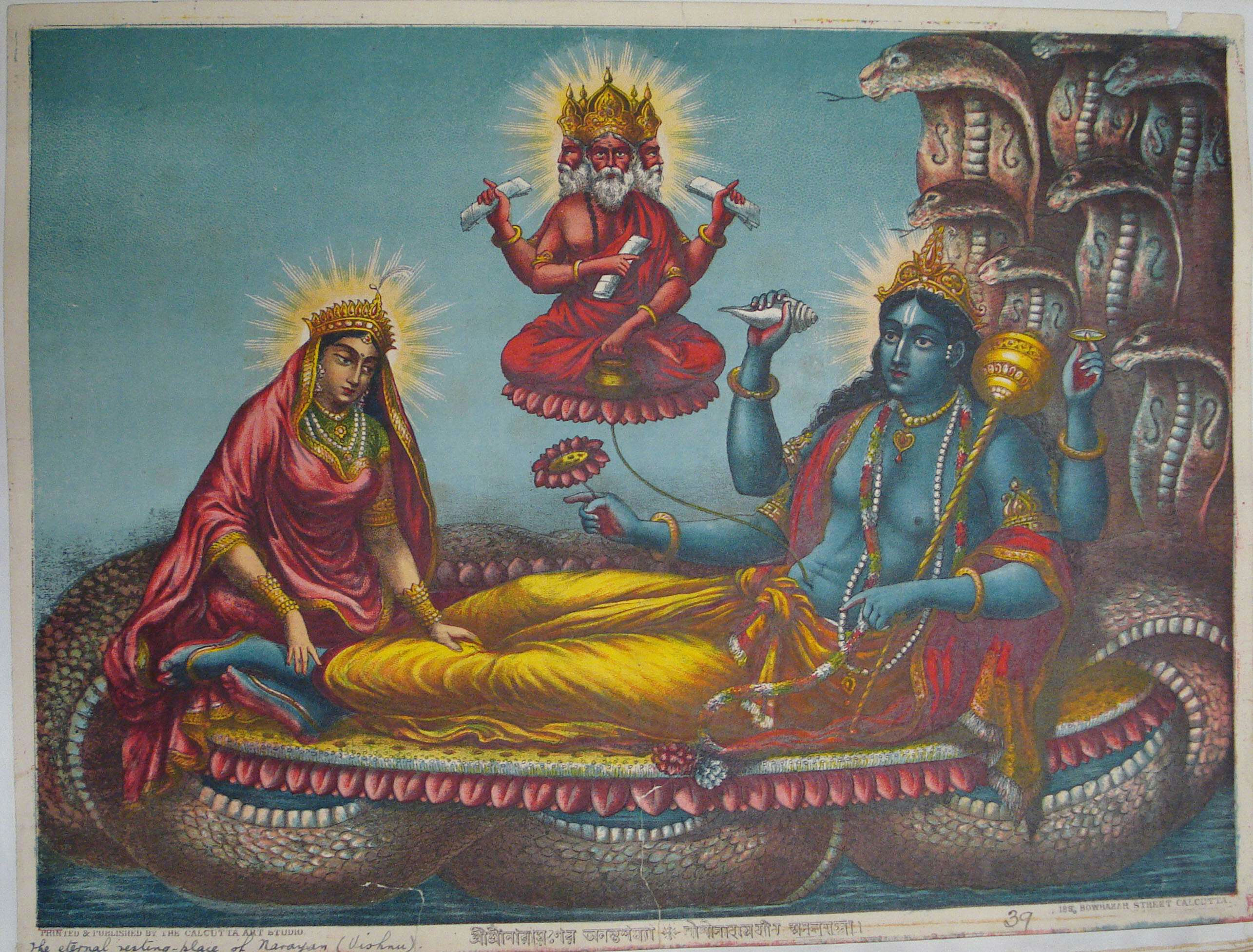
Vishnu rests on the serpent Ananta while Brahma sits on a lotus throne, the plant emitting from Vishnu's navel.

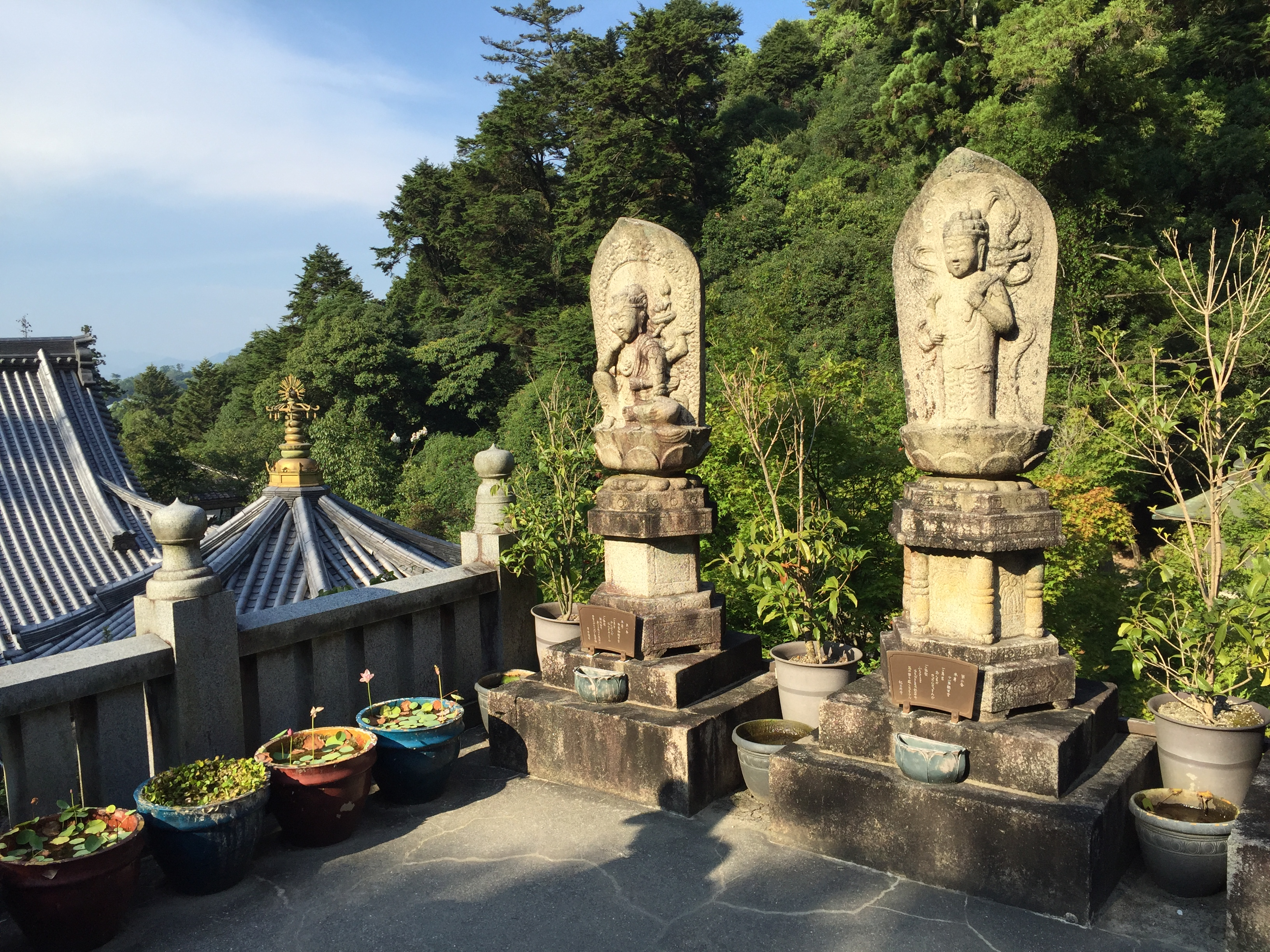
Miniature Lotus flowers Daisho-in, Miyajima, Japan

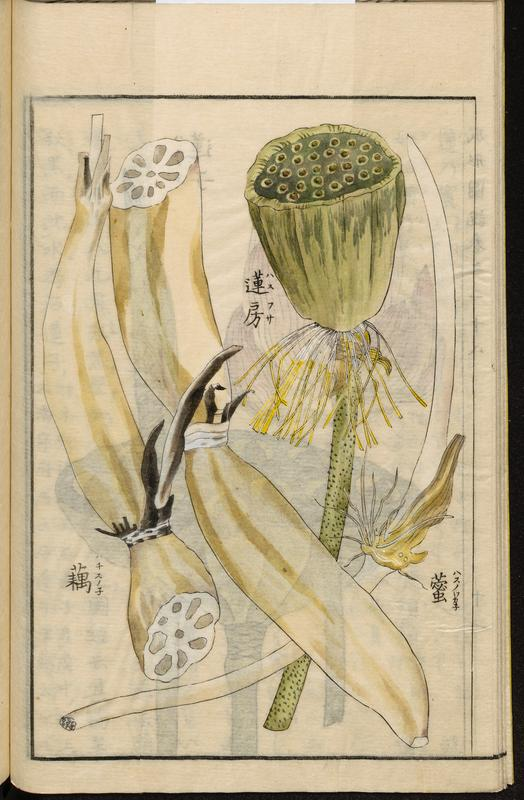
Illustration from the Seikei Zusetsu, 1804, Leiden University Library, Ser. 1042

== Symbolism ==
It has been considered a symbol of beauty, absolute purity, honesty, rebirth, self-regeneration, enlightenment. Another plant known as a lotus (Nymphaea spp.) was considered a supreme plant by Egyptians for its fragrant transformative scent while living its alternating existence below and above the water surface. It was also used by the Egyptians as a means of inducing altered states of consciousness and making contact with other realms of existence. The blue lotus, N. caerulea, was considered as a symbol of the sun rising out of night.

In Hindu philosophy, the lotus is regarded to be the first born of creation and a magic womb for the universe and gods. It has also been associated with longevity, fertility, wealth, and knowledge.

It is considered a symbol of freedom from desire and material attachment while invoking purity at a level of mind, speech and action by Buddhist tradition. Also connected:

- The blue lotus symbolizes the victory of spirit over that of intelligence, knowledge and wisdom. (This is not Buddhist but ancient Egyptian; Nelumbo nucifera has no blue cultivars.)
- The white lotus symbolizes the Bodhi being awakened, ascent towards mental purity, and spiritual perfection. It also implies a state of spiritual maturity connected to the pacification of one's nature.
- The pink lotus is considered to be Buddha's true lotus and the supreme one out of all of the other lotuses.

== See also ==
- Ashtamangala (Eight Auspicious Symbols)
- Lotus position
- Om mani padme hum - "the jewel in the lotus"
