= Zarathustra in Manichaeism =

Zarathustra (查拉圖斯特拉)
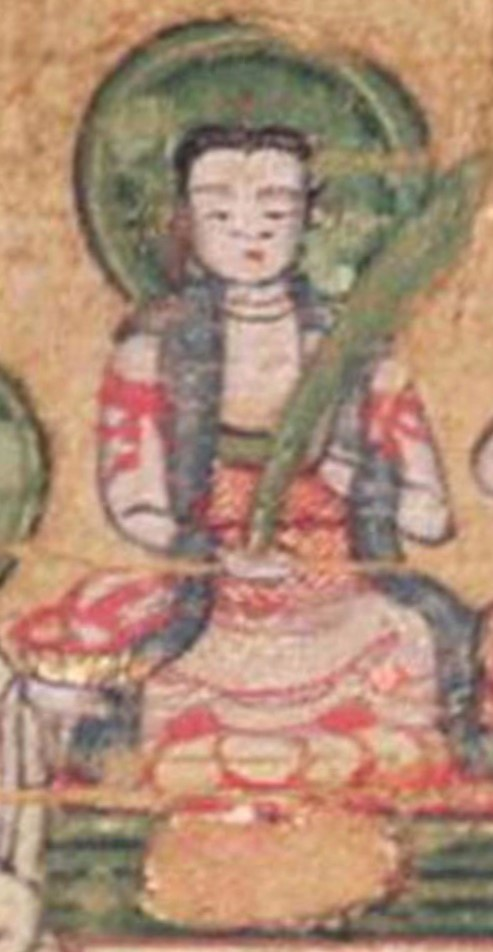
- Zarathustra in the Manichaean Diagram of the Universe
- Successor: Buddha (釋迦文佛)
- Ethnic group: Avestan

In Manichaeism, Zarathustra (瑣羅亞斯德) is considered one of the four prophets of the faith, along with Buddha, Jesus and Mani. Mani believed that the teachings of Gautama Buddha, Zarathustra, and Jesus were incomplete, and that his revelations were for the entire world, calling his teachings the "Religion of Light".

Manichaeism considers Zarathustra to be a figure in a line of prophets of which Mani (216–276) was the culmination. Zarathustra's ethical dualism is—to an extent—incorporated in Mani's doctrine, which views the world as being locked in an epic battle between opposing forces of good and evil. Manicheanism also incorporates other elements of Zoroastrian tradition, particularly the names of supernatural beings; however, many of these other Zoroastrian elements are either not part of Zarathustra's own teachings or are used quite differently from how they are used in Zoroastrianism.

== Usage of Zoroastrian theonyms ==
When they moved eastward and were translated into Iranian languages, the names of the Manichaean deities (or angels) were often transformed into the names of Zoroastrian yazatas. Thus Abbā dəRabbūṯā ("The Father of Greatness", the highest Manichaean deity of Light), in Middle Persian texts might either be translated literally as pīd ī wuzurgīh, or substituted with the name of the deity Zurwān.

Similarly, the Manichaean primal figure Nāšā Qaḏmāyā "The Original Man" was rendered Ohrmazd Bay, after the Zoroastrian god Ohrmazd. This process continued in Manichaeism's meeting with Chinese Buddhism, where, for example, the original Aramaic קריא qaryā (the "call" from the World of Light to those seeking rescue from the World of Darkness), becomes identified in the Chinese scriptures with Guanyin (觀音 or Avalokiteśvara in Sanskrit, literally, "watching/perceiving sounds [of the world]", the bodhisattva of Compassion).

The original six Syriac writings are not preserved, although their Syriac names have been. There are also fragments and quotations from them. A long quotation, preserved by the eighth-century Nestorian Christian author Theodore Bar Konai, shows that in the original Syriac Aramaic writings of Mani there was no influence of Iranian or Zoroastrian terms. The terms for the Manichaean deities in the original Syriac writings are in Aramaic. The adaptation of Manichaeism to the Zoroastrian religion appears to have begun in Mani's lifetime however, with his writing of the Middle Persian Shabuhragan, his book dedicated to the Sasanian emperor, Shapur I.

In it, there are mentions of Zoroastrian divinities such as Ahura Mazda, Angra Mainyu, and Āz. Manichaeism is often presented as a Persian religion, mostly due to the vast number of Middle Persian, Parthian, and Sogdian (as well as Turkish) texts discovered by German researchers near Turpan in what is now Xinjiang, China, during the early 1900s. However, from the vantage point of its original Syriac descriptions (as quoted by Theodore Bar Khonai and outlined above), Manichaeism may be better described as a unique phenomenon of Aramaic Babylonia, occurring in proximity to two other new Aramaic religious phenomena, Talmudic Judaism and Mandaeism, which also appeared in Babylonia in roughly the third century.
