= Father of Greatness =

Eternal divine manifestation of good in Manichaeism

- God of Light, King of Realm of Light
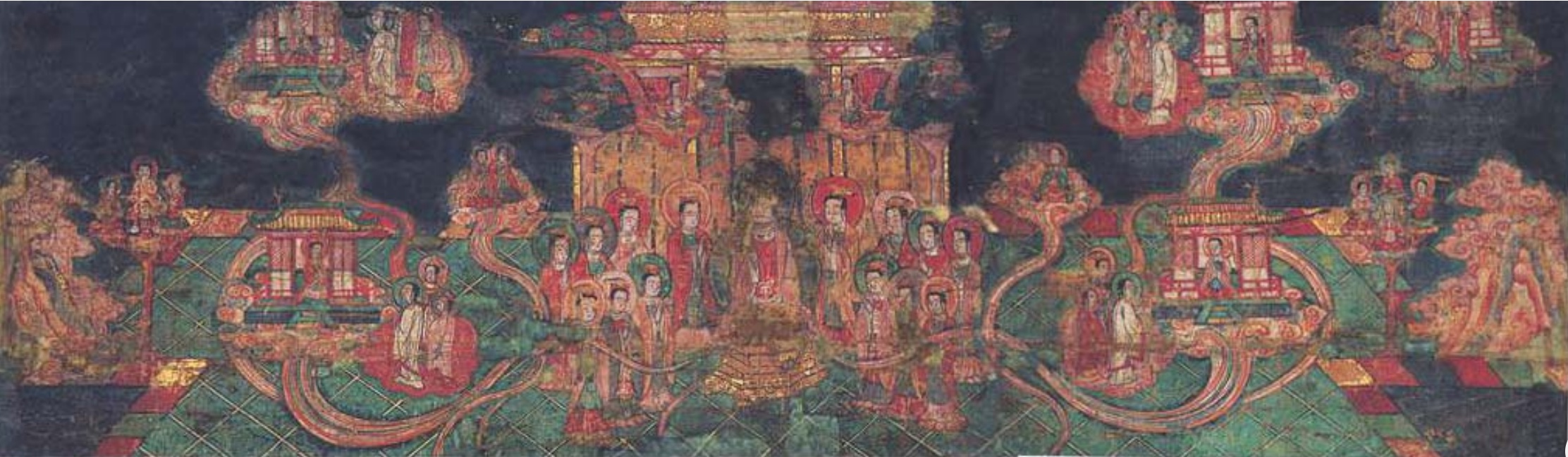
- Father of Greatness sitting on a pedestal in the centre in the Realm of Light. Top section of the Manichaean Diagram of the Universe.
- Other names: Zurwān
- Abode: Realm of Light
- Symbol: Light
- Offspring: Jesus the Splendour

Equivalents
- Zoroastrian: Zurvan
- Gnostic: Monad
- Mandaean: Hayyi Rabbi

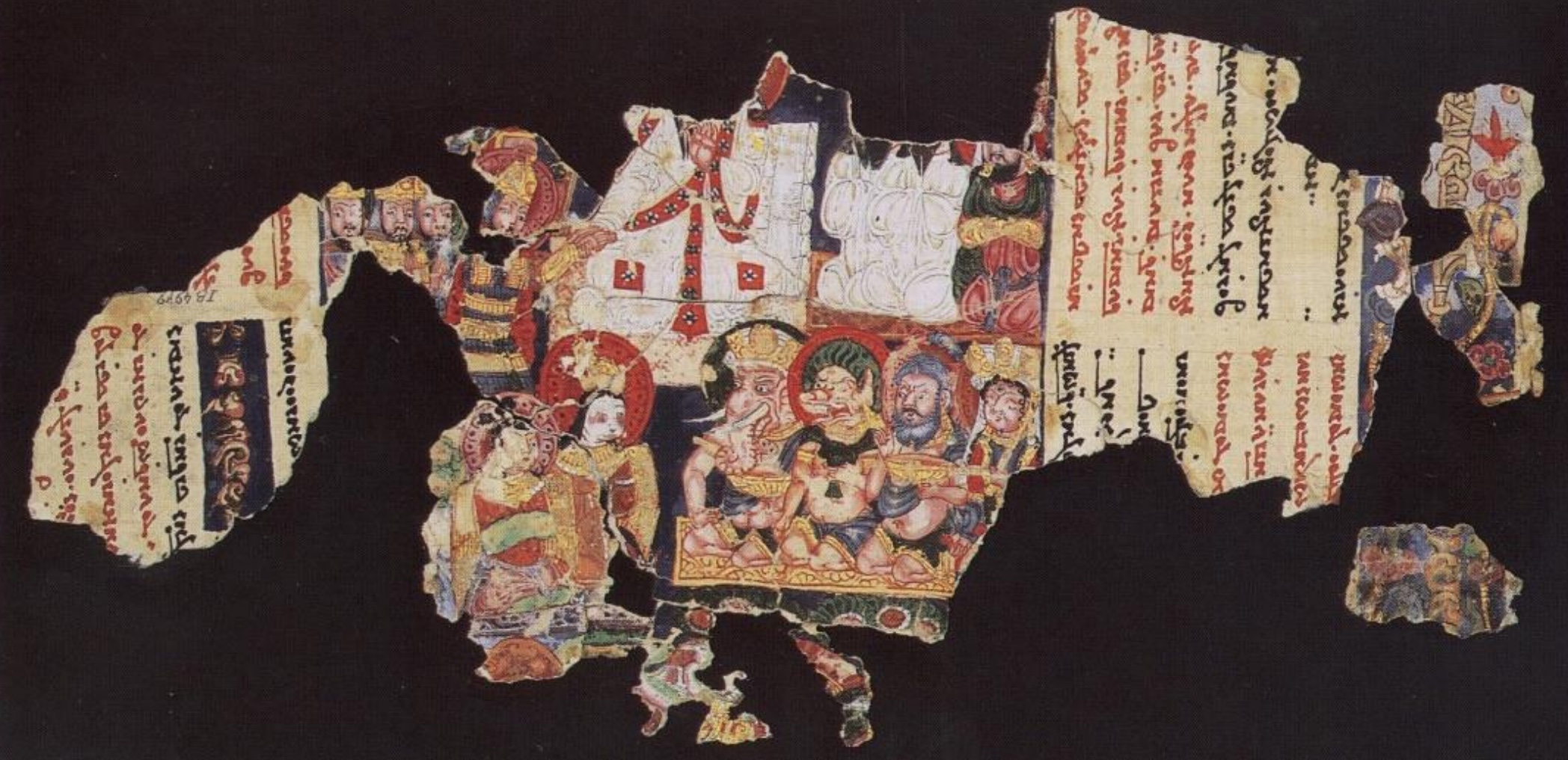
Under Central Asian influence, the "four-fold Father of Greatness" was split up (from left) into the Hindu deities Ganesha, Vishnu, Brahma, and Shiva. Leaf from a Manichaean book MIK III 4979, 8th–9th century, discovered in Karakhoja.

The Father of Greatness (Middle Aramaic transl. abbā ḏ-rabbūṯā; Chinese: 明尊; pinyin: Míngzūn; lit. 'Radiant Lord') is the eternal divine manifestation of good in Manichaeism, a four-fold deity, embracing divinity, light, power and goodness. His throne is surrounded by at least 156 peaceful entities: 12 aeons, aeons of the aeons, and angels.

When the Prince of Darkness assaulted the Realm of Light, he invoked entities of light to ward off the invaders. These entities mingled with the demons and gave existence to the earthly beings, thus humans carry consubstantial light particles of the Father of Greatness, but are unaware of them until they awaken from their sleep by remembering their divine origin. The Father of Greatness responds by creating a series of entities to prepare a rescue for light particles.

== Theodicy ==
Manichaeism rejects everything associated with evil from the Father of Greatness, the Manichaean deity. Neither can he cause suffering nor is he able to charge. He can merely defend. Thus, the power of the Father of Greatness is limited by its own nature. Although he is not all-powerful, in the end time he will have gathered all light particles and evil will be banished into its own kingdom never commingling again. Therefore, Manichaeism also rejects the portrayal of God in the Old Testament, who promises victory over one's enemies (Lev: 26:3-10). Accordingly, the problem of evil can be solved straightforwardly as God is limited in his power against forces beyond the world of light and by his own nature.

== Parallels in Mandaeism ==
In the Asut Malkia, a commonly recited Mandaean prayer, another name for Hayyi Rabbi is Aba Rba ḏ-ʿqara (ࡀࡁࡀ ࡓࡁࡀ ࡖࡏࡒࡀࡓࡀ 'Great Father of Glory').

== See also ==
- Ahura Mazda
- Demiurge
- God the Father
- Hayyi Rabbi in Mandaeism, also referred to as Mara ḏ-Rabuta (the Lord of Greatness)
- Sophia (Gnosticism)
