= The Buddha in Manichaeism =

Siddartha Gautama (釋迦文佛)
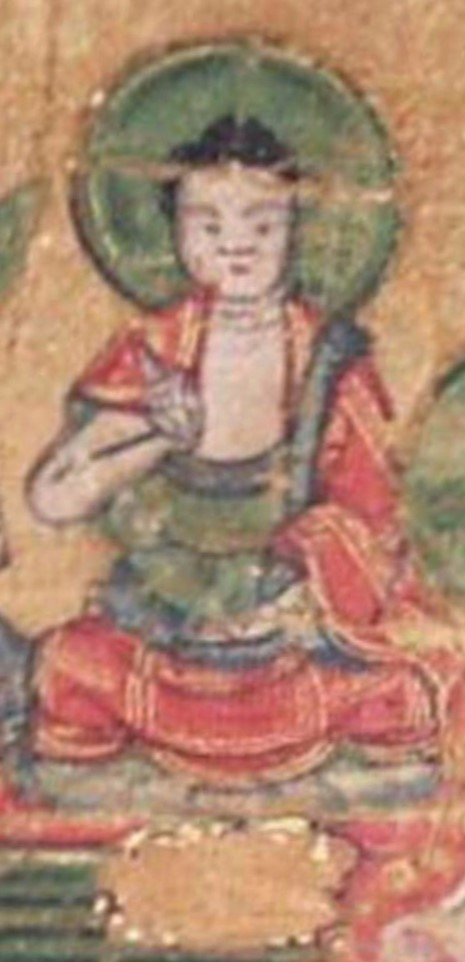
- The Buddha in the Manichaean Diagram of the Universe
- Predecessor: Zarathustra
- Successor: Jesus (夷數)
- Ethnic group: Magadhi Prakrit

In Manichaeism, the Buddha (喬達摩悉達多) is considered one of the four prophets of the faith, along with Zoroaster, Jesus and Mani. Mani believed that the teachings of the Buddha, Zoroaster, and Jesus were incomplete, and that his revelations were for the entire world, calling his teachings the "Religion of Light".

Manichaeism also often calls Jesus a Buddha. This is because the term prophet was unfamiliar to a Chinese audience so Buddha was used as a substitute. It does not imply a belief in enlightenment.

Manichaeism was introduced into China during the Tang dynasty through Central Asian communities and was regarded as an improper form of Buddhism by the Tang authorities.

== Influences from Buddhism ==
Manichaeism was directly influenced by Buddhism. Mircea Eliade noted similarities in the symbolism of light and mystic knowledge, predating Manichaeism, and possibly going back to an early common Indo-Iranian source.Giovanni Verardi notes that Manichaeism is the prime source for comparisons between Buddhism and Gnosticism, Manichaeism representing "the same urban and mercantile ambience of which Buddhism was an expression in India." When the mercantile economy declined due to the decline of the Roman Empire, Manichaeism lost its support. The Manichaeans were hostile to the closed society of farming and landownership, just like the Buddhism conflicted with the "non-urban world controlled by Brahman laymen." (Note: Note that Buddhism declined in India after the end of the Gupta Empire (c. 320–650 CE), which was related to the decline of the Roman Empire and the decline of sea trade with the Romans. Power was decentralised in India, and Buddhism lost its support from royal courts, being replaced by Brahmanical Hinduism.)

Mani, an Arsacid Persian by birth, was born 216 AD in Mesopotamia (modern Iraq), then within the Persian Sassanid Empire. According to the Cologne Mani-Codex, Mani's parents were members of the Jewish Christian Gnostic sect known as the Elcesaites.

Mani believed that the teachings of Buddha, Zoroaster, and Jesus were incomplete, and that his revelations were for the entire world, calling his teachings the "Religion of Light". Following Mani's travels to the Kushan Empire (Note: Several religious paintings in Bamiyan are attributed to him.) at the beginning of his proselytizing career, various Buddhist influences seem to have permeated Manichaeism:

Buddhist influences were significant in the formation of Mani's religious thought. The transmigration of souls became a Manichaean belief, and the quadripartite structure of the Manichaean community, divided between male and female monks (the "elect") and lay followers (the "hearers") who supported them, appears to be based on that of the Buddhist sangha.

According to Willis Barnstone and Marvin Meyer, evidence of the influence of Buddhist thought on the teachings of Mani can be found throughout texts related to Mani. In the story of the death of Mani, the Buddhist term nirvana is used:

It was a day of pain
and a time of sorrow
when the messenger of light
entered death
when he entered complete Nirvana

Manichaeism might have also adopted Buddhist meditation.

The pure devout must sit down in pious meditation and he should turn away from sin and increase what is pious.

== Usage of the term to refer to other individuals ==
After Manichaeism was introduced into China, because the image of Jesus was quite unfamiliar to Chinese culture, missionaries combined it with Buddhist culture, called Jesus Buddha, and gave him a model of great mercy and relief. Buddhist image. Therefore, believers wrote in the following excerpt from the hymn "Praise Jesus Text", which is like a Buddhist scripture in the Chinese Manichaean hymn scroll:

The Buddha-Jesus, who is the most powerful and compassionate person in the world, forgives my sins.
Listen to my painful words and lead me out of the sea of poisonous fire. I wish to give the fragrant water of liberation, the twelve jeweled crowns and the drapes. To cleanse me from the dust of my wonderful nature, and to adorn my pure body to make it upright. May I be rid of the three winters and three poisonous knots, and the six thieves and six poisonous winds. Let the great dharma spring glorify my nature, and let the trees of nature and flowers flourish. May the great waves of fire and the dark clouds and fogs be quenched. Let the great dharma day shine brightly, so that my mind may always be pure. May I be relieved of the disease of dumbness and blindness, and of the monsters and devils. Send down the great Dharma medicine for speedy healing, and silence the divine incantation to drive away the spirits. I have been subjected to so many obstacles and countless other hardships. In view of this, the great sage should forgive me and save me from all the disasters.
May Jesus have mercy on me and free me from all demonic bonds.

The Manichaean Painting of the Buddha Jesus is titled referring to Jesus as a Buddha. (Note: "夷數" (pinyin: Yíshù; Wade–Giles: I-shu) is the Chinese translation of the name Jesus by the Manichaeans.)

In the Uighur confession, four prayers are directed to the supreme God (Äzrua), the God of the Sun and the Moon, and fivefold God and the buddhas.

== Late syncretism and decline ==
Following the introduction of Manichaeism to China, Manichaeans in China adopted a syncretic, sinified vocabulary borrowed primarily from Chinese Buddhism. Between 9th and 14th-centuries, following centuries of pressure to assimilate and persecution by successive Chinese dynasties, Chinese Manichaeans increasing involved themselves with the Pure Land school of Mahayana Buddhism in southern China, practicing together so closely alongside the Mahayana Buddhists that over the years Manichaeism came to be absorbed into the Pure Land school making the two traditions indistinguishable. Through this close interaction, Manichaeism had profound influence on Chinese Maitreyan Buddhist sects such as the White Lotus Sect.

Manichaeism survived among the population and had a profound influence on the tradition of the Chinese folk religious sects integrating with the Maitreyan beliefs such as the White Lotus Sect.

Due to the rise of the Ming dynasty the name for Manichaeism Mingjiao was seen as offensive to the Emperor, so it received particular persecution

An account in Fozu Tongji, an important historiography of Buddhism in China compiled by Buddhist scholars during 1258–1269, says that the Manichaeans worshipped the "white Buddha" and their leader wore a violet headgear, while the followers wore white costumes. Many Manichaeans took part in rebellions against the Song government and were eventually quelled. After that, all governments were suppressive against Manichaeism and its followers and the religion was banned by the Ming Dynasty in 1370.

During and after the 14th century, some Chinese Manichaeans involved themselves with the Pure Land school of Mahayana Buddhism in southern China. Those Manichaeans practiced their rituals so closely alongside the Mahayana Buddhists that over the years the two sects became indistinguishable.

Manichaeism in China assumes certain Chinese characteristics, assimilating to both Buddhism and Taoism. Chinese translations of Manichaean treatises are couched in Buddhist phraseology, and the religion's founder (Mar) Mani (known in China as (末)摩尼, (Mo)-Mani) received the title of the "Buddha of Light" (Chinese: 光明佛 or 光佛), and a life story resembling that of Gautama Buddha. At the same time, the supposedly Taoist treatise, the Huahujing "Scripture of the Conversion of the Barbarians", popular with Chinese Manichaeans, declared Mani to be a reincarnation of Laozi. As to the Confucian civil authorities of the Song state, when the clandestine cells of Mani's followers came to their attention, they were usually lumped together with assorted other suspicious and potentially troublesome sects as "vegetarian demon worshipers" (Chinese: 吃菜事魔).

Not surprisingly, such Manichaean temples that were erected in Song China usually had an official Buddhist or Taoist affiliation. There are records, for example, of a Manichaean temple in Taoist disguise at Siming. This temple - one of the northernmost known Manichaean sites of the Song era - was established in the 960s, and was still active - in a more standard Taoist way, but with a memory of Manichaeism retained - in the 1260s.

In Qianku there is also a strong veneration of the Sun and the Moon, which are often called the Sunlight Buddha and Moonlight Buddha by locals

=== Cao'an temple ===
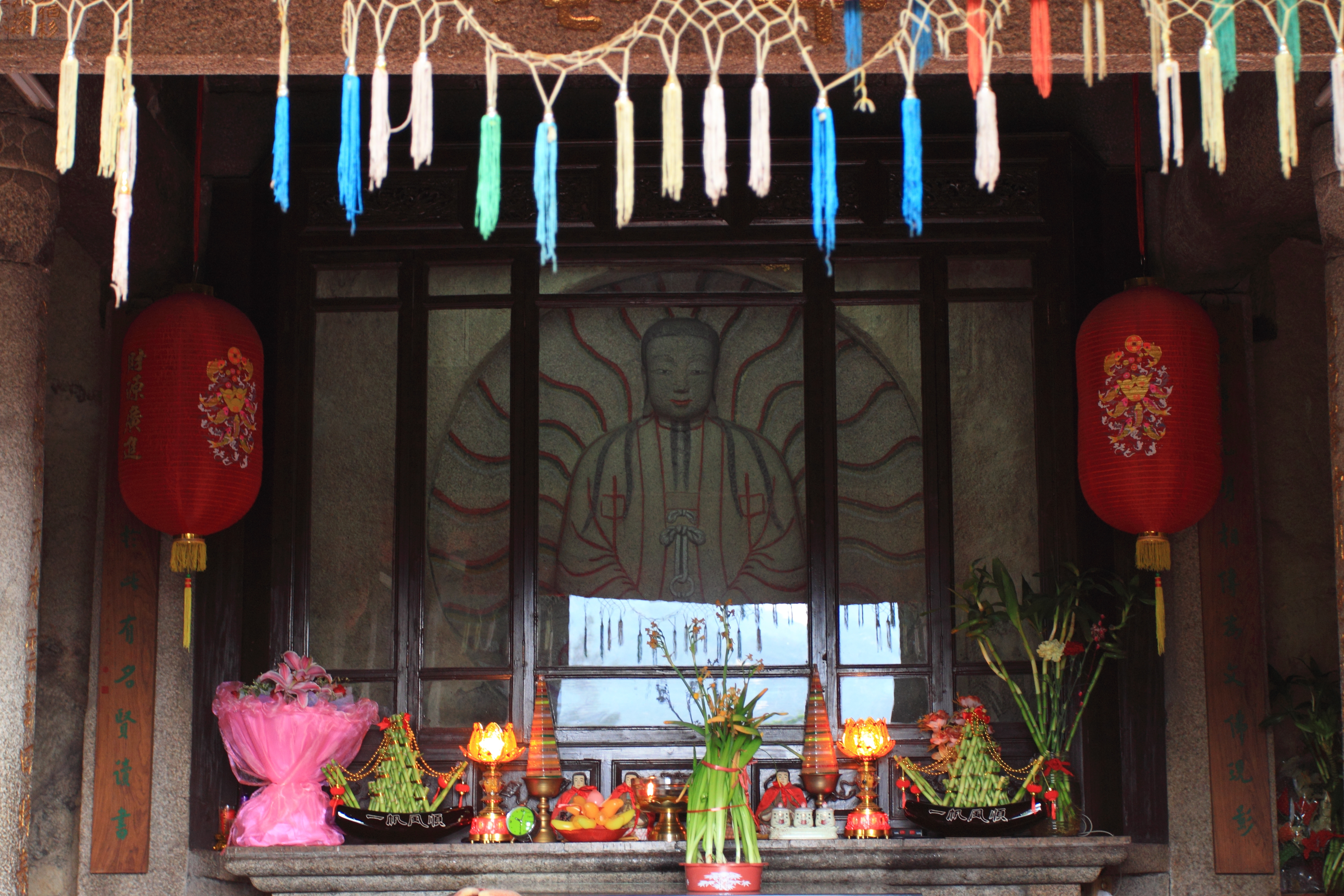
The Buddha of Light (Prophet Mani) carved from the living rock

The Cao'an temple in Fujian stands as a vivid example the subsumption of Manichaeism into Buddhism, as a statue of the "Buddha of Light" is thought to be a representation of the prophet Mani.

The most remarkable Manichaean relic in the temple is the statue of Manichaeism's founder Mani, commonly referred to in the Chinese Manichaean tradition as the "Buddha of Light". According to an inscription, the statue was donated to the temple by a local adherent in 1339.

While the statue may look like any other Buddha to a casual observer, experts note a number of peculiarities which distinguish it from a typical portrayal of the Buddha. Instead of being curly-haired and clean-shaven, as most other Buddha statues, this Buddha of Light is depicted having straight hair draped over his shoulders, and sporting a beard. The facial features of the prophet (arched eyebrows, fleshy jowls) are somewhat different from a traditional Chinese stone Buddha as well. It is even said that the stone Mani the Buddha of Light used to have a mustache or sideburns, but they were removed by a 20th-century Buddhist monk, trying to make the statue more like a traditional Buddha.

Instead of looking down, as Buddha statues usually do, the Mani statue looks straight at the worshipers. Instead of being held in a typical Buddhist mudrā, Mani's hands rest on his belly, with both palms facing upward.

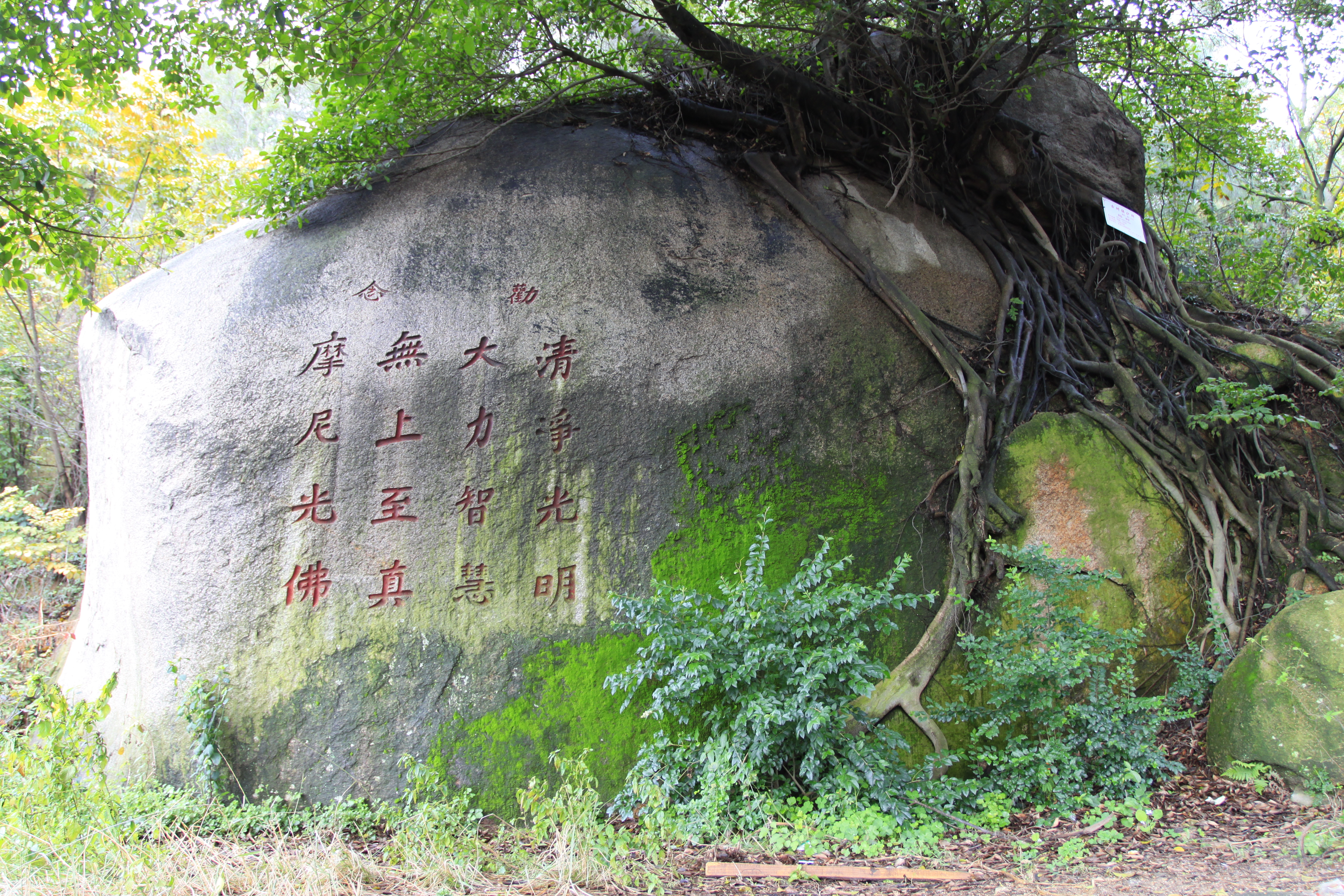
Restored inscription urging the faithful to remember "Purity (清净), Light (光明), Power (大力), and Wisdom (智慧)", and "Moni (摩尼) the Buddha of Light (光佛)"

In order to give the statue an overall luminous impression, the sculptor carved its head, body, and hands from stones of different hues.

Instead of a nianfo phrase, universally seen in China's Buddhist temples, an inscription on a stone in the courtyard dated 1445 urges the faithful to remember "Purity (清净), Light (光明), Power (大力), and Wisdom (智慧)", which are the four attributes of the Father of Light, one of the chief figures of the Manichaean pantheon. These four words (eight Chinese characters) were apparently an important motto of Chinese Manichaeism; it is described as such in an anti-Manichean work by the Fujianese Taoist Bo Yuchan (real name Ge Changgeng; fl. 1215). The original inscription was destroyed during the Cultural Revolution, but later "restored" (apparently, on another rock).

== See also ==
- Chinese Manichaeism
- Jesus in Manichaeism

== Annotations ==
=== Bibliography ===
- Ball, Warwick (2001). Rome in the East: the transformation of an empire. Routledge. p. 437.
- Barnstone, Willis; Meyer, Marvin W. (2005). The Gnostic Bible.
- Boyce, Mary (2001). Zoroastrians: their religious beliefs and practices. Routledge. p. 111.
- Coyle, John Kevin (2009). Manichaeism and Its Legacy. BRILL. ISBN 978-90-04-17574-7.
- Foltz, Richard (2010). Religions of the Silk Road (2 ed.). Palgrave Macmillan. ISBN 978-0-230-62125-1.
- Koenen, L.; Römer, C., eds. (1988). "Der Kölner Mani-Kodex. Über das Werden seines Leibes". Papyrologica Coloniensia (in German). 14 (Critical ed.). Abhandlung der Reinisch-Westfälischen Akademie der Wissenschaften.
- Lieu, Samuel N. C. (Mar 1980), "Nestorians and Manichaeans on the South China Coast", Vigiliae Christianae, vol. 34, no. 1, pp. 71–88, doi:10.2307/1582860, JSTOR 1582860
- Lieu, Samuel N. C. (1992), Manichaeism in the Later Roman Empire and Medieval China, Volume 63 of Wissenschaftliche Untersuchungen Zum Neuen Testament (2 ed.), Mohr Siebeck, ISBN 3161458206
- Lieu, Samuel N. C. (1998), Manichaeism in Central Asia and China, Volume 45 of Nag Hammadi and Manichaean Studies, Brill, ISBN 9004104054
- Ma, Xisha; Meng, Huiying (2011). Popular Religion and Shamanism. Brill. ISBN 978-9004174559.
- Mair, Victor H. (1987), "(Review of) Manichaeism in the Later Roman Empire and Medieval China: A Historical Survey by Samuel N. C. Lieu; The Chinese Transformation of Manichaeism: A Study of Chinese Manichaean Terminology by Peter Bryder", T'oung Pao, 73 (4/5): 313–324, JSTOR 4528393
- Michaels, Axel (2004), Hinduism. Past and present, Princeton, New Jersey: Princeton University Press
- Scott, David A. (1985), "Manichaean Views of Buddhism", History of Religions, 25 (2), University of Chicago Press: 99–115, doi:10.1086/463029, JSTOR 1062608
- Verardi, Giovanni (1997), "The Buddhists, the Gnostics and the Antinomistic Society, or the Arabian Sea in the First Century AD" (PDF), AION, 57 (3/4): 324–346
- Werner, Sundermann (20 July 2009). "Mani". Encyclopaedia Iranica.
- Yar, Char (2012). Monijiao (Manichaeism) in China (Speech). Lecture presented at the Worldwide Conference for Historical Research. academia.edu. Beijing.
