= Anima mundi =

Concept in metaphysics

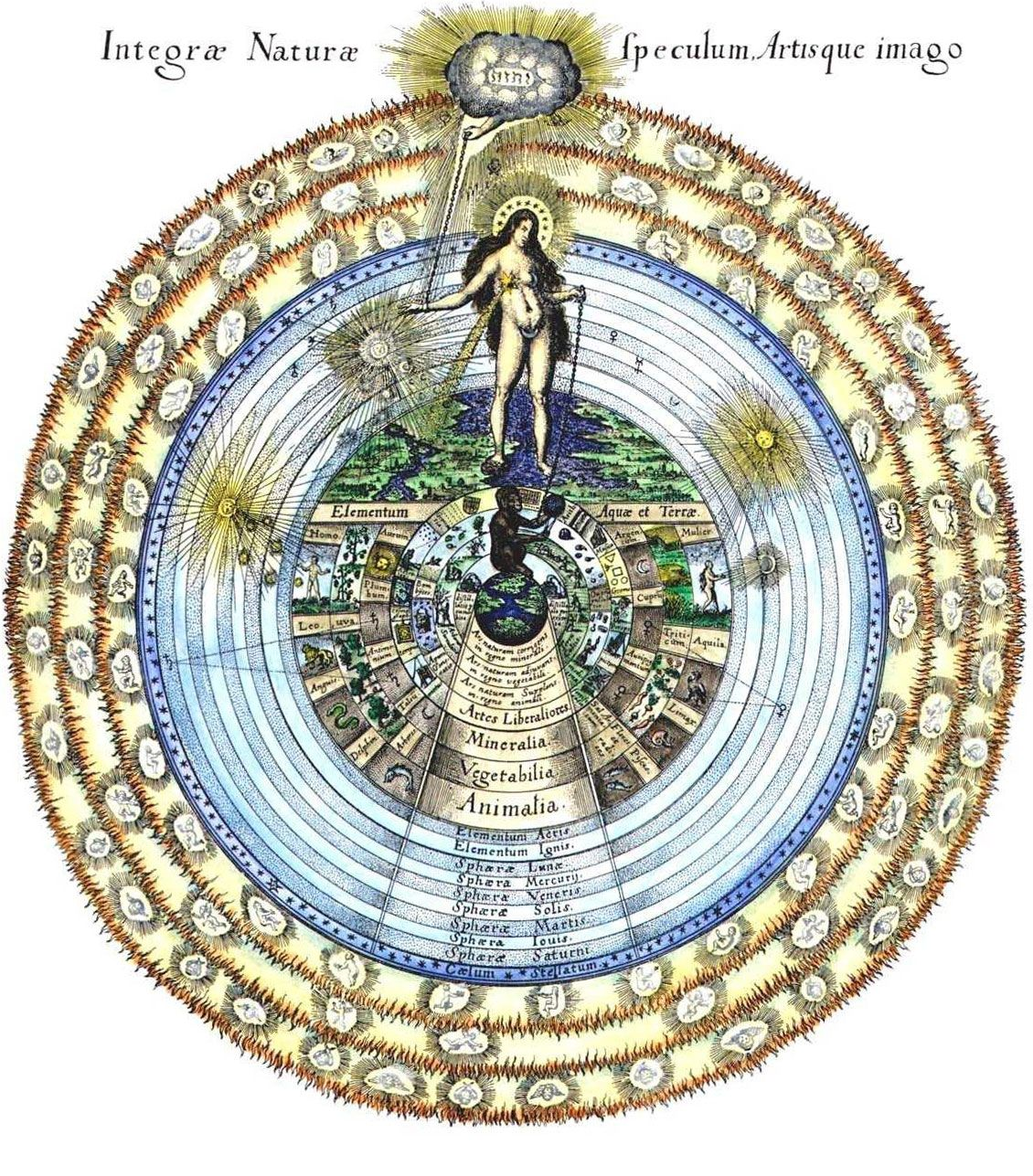
Illustration of the correspondences between all parts of the created cosmos, with its soul depicted as a woman, from Robert Fludd's Utriusque Cosmi Maioris Scilicet et Minoris Metaphysica, Physica atque Technica Historia

The concept of the anima mundi (Latin), world soul (Ancient Greek: ψυχὴ κόσμου, psychḕ kósmou), or soul of everything (ψυχή τοῦ παντός, psychḕ toû pantós) posits an intrinsic connection between all living beings, suggesting that the world is animated by a soul much like the human body. Rooted in ancient Greek and Roman philosophy, the idea holds that the world soul infuses the cosmos with life and intelligence. This notion has been influential across various systems of thought, including Stoicism, Gnosticism, Neoplatonism, and Hermeticism, shaping metaphysical and cosmological frameworks throughout history.

In ancient philosophy, Plato's dialogue Timaeus introduces the universe as a living creature endowed with a soul and reason, constructed by the demiurge according to a rational pattern expressed through mathematical principles. Plato describes the world soul as a mixture of sameness and difference, forming a unified, harmonious entity that permeates the cosmos. This soul animates the universe, ensuring its rational structure and function according to a divine plan, with the motions of the seven classical planets reflecting the deep connection between mathematics and reality in Platonic thought.

Stoicism and Gnosticism are two significant philosophical systems that elaborated on this concept. Stoicism, founded by Zeno of Citium in the early 3rd century BCE, posited that the universe is a single, living entity permeated by the divine rational principle known as the logos, which organizes and animates the cosmos, functioning as its soul. Gnosticism, emerging in the early centuries of the Common Era, often associates the world soul with Sophia, who embodies divine wisdom and the descent into the material world. Gnostics believed that esoteric knowledge could transcend the material world and reunite with the divine.

Neoplatonism and Hermeticism also incorporated the concept of the world soul into their cosmologies. Neoplatonism, flourishing in the 3rd century CE through philosophers like Plotinus and Proclus, proposed a hierarchical structure of existence with the World Soul acting as an intermediary between the intelligible realm and the material world, animating and organizing the cosmos. Hermeticism, based on writings attributed to Hermes Trismegistus, views the world soul as a vital force uniting the cosmos. Hermetic texts describe the cosmos as a living being imbued with a divine spirit, emphasizing the unity and interconnection of all things. Aligning oneself with the world soul is seen as a path to spiritual enlightenment and union with the divine, a belief that experienced a resurgence during the Renaissance when Hermeticism was revived and integrated into Renaissance thought, influencing various intellectual and spiritual movements of the time.

== Ancient philosophy ==
=== Plato ===
Plato described the universe as a living being in his dialogue Timaeus (30b–d):

Thus, then, in accordance with the likely account, we must declare that this Cosmos has verily come into existence as a Living Creature endowed with soul and reason [...] a Living Creature, one and visible, containing within itself all the living creatures which are by nature akin to itself.

Plato's Timaeus describes this living cosmos as being built by the demiurge, constructed to be self-identical and intelligible to reason, according to a rational pattern expressed in mathematical principles and Pythagorean ratios describing the structure of the cosmos, and particularly the motions of the seven classical planets. The living universe is also a god titled Ouranos and Kosmos, which shows, as scholars have argued, that Plato mediates between the poetic and presocratic traditions.

In Timaeus, Plato presents the cosmos as a single, living organism that possesses a soul and intelligence. The demiurge, a divine craftsman, creates the universe by imposing order on pre-existing chaotic matter. This creation is not ex nihilo but rather a process of organizing the cosmos according to the eternal Forms, which are perfect, immutable archetypes of all things.

Plato explains that the world soul is a mixture of the same and the different, woven together to form a unified, harmonious entity. This soul permeates the entire cosmos, animating it and endowing it with life and intelligence. The world soul is responsible for the rational structure of the universe, ensuring that everything functions according to a divine plan.

The rational pattern of the cosmos is expressed through mathematical principles and Pythagorean ratios, reflecting the deep connection between mathematics and the structure of reality in Platonic thought. The motions of the seven classical planets (the Moon, Mercury, Venus, the Sun, Mars, Jupiter, and Saturn) are particularly significant, as they embody the harmony and order of the universe.

Plato's identification of the cosmos as a god, titled Ouranos and Kosmos, reveals his synthesis of different philosophical traditions. The name Ouranos connects the world soul to the ancient Greek personification of the sky, while Kosmos signifies order and beauty. By mediating between poetic and presocratic traditions, Plato integrates mythological and philosophical elements into a coherent cosmological vision.

=== Stoicism ===
The Stoic school of philosophy, founded by Zeno of Citium in the early 3rd century BCE, significantly contributed to the development of the concept of the world soul. Stoicism posits that the universe is a single, living entity permeated by a divine rational principle known as the logos. This principle organizes and animates the cosmos, functioning as its soul.

Central to Stoic cosmology is the belief that the logos operates as the rational structure underlying all existence. This rational principle is equated with God, nature, and the soul of the universe, making the cosmos a living, rational organism. The Stoics identified the world soul with the concept of pneuma, a life-giving force that pervades and sustains all things. Pneuma is a mixture of air and fire, elements considered active and capable of bestowing life and motion.

The Stoic philosopher Cleanthes described the world soul in his "Hymn to Zeus", where he praises Zeus (a personification of the logos) for harmonizing the cosmos and ensuring its rational order. Chrysippus, another prominent Stoic, further developed the idea of the world soul, arguing that it is the animating principle that ensures the coherence and unity of the cosmos.

The Stoic view of the world soul differs from Plato's in that it emphasizes the materiality of the pneuma. For the Stoics, the soul of the universe is not an abstract, separate entity but a physical presence that interpenetrates the cosmos, providing it with structure and purpose. This physicalist interpretation reflects the Stoic commitment to the idea that only bodies can act and be acted upon.

The Stoic concept of the world soul also has ethical implications. Since the logos governs the cosmos rationally, living in accordance with nature means aligning one's life with this rational order. The Stoics believed that by understanding and accepting the world's rational structure, individuals could achieve a state of tranquility and virtue.

== Gnosticism and Neoplatonism ==
=== Gnosticism ===
Gnosticism, a diverse and syncretic religious movement that emerged in the early centuries of the Common Era, also incorporated the concept of the world soul into its cosmological and theological framework. Gnostic systems generally posited a dualistic worldview, contrasting the material world with a higher, spiritual reality. In this context, the world soul often played a crucial role in bridging the divine and material realms.

In Gnostic thought, the world soul is often associated with the figure of Sophia (Wisdom), who embodies both the divine wisdom and the tragic descent into the material world. Sophia's fall and subsequent redemption are central themes in many Gnostic texts. According to the Apocryphon of John, a key Gnostic scripture, Sophia's emanation resulted in the creation of the material world, which is seen as flawed and distant from the divine pleroma (fullness).

In Gnostic systems, the concept of the world soul often carries significant ethical and soteriological implications. Gnostics believed that by acquiring esoteric knowledge and understanding their divine origin, individuals could transcend the material world and reunite with the divine. This process of gnosis involved recognizing the world soul's entrapment in the material realm and working towards its liberation.

==== Manichaeism ====
In Manichaeism, a major Gnostic religion founded by the prophet Mani in the 3rd century CE, the world soul was also called the Light Soul and the Living Soul (Middle Persian: grīw zīndag), contrasting it with matter, which was associated with lifelessness and death and within which the world soul was imprisoned. The world soul was personified as the Suffering Jesus (Jesus patibilis) who, like the historical Jesus, was depicted as being crucified in the world. This mystica cruxificio was present in all parts of the world, including the skies, soil, and trees, as expressed in the Coptic Manichaean psalms.

==== Mandaeism ====
Mandaeism, another Gnostic tradition that has survived to the present day, also incorporates a concept akin to the world soul. In Mandaean cosmology, the soul's journey through the material world and its eventual return to the World of Light is a central narrative. The soul's purification and ascent are facilitated by esoteric knowledge and ritual practices.

=== Neoplatonism ===
The concept of the world soul continued to influence later philosophical thought, particularly in the development of Neoplatonism. Neoplatonists such as Plotinus and Proclus expanded on Plato's ideas, emphasizing the unity and divinity of the cosmos and its connection to the One, the ultimate source of all existence.

Neoplatonism, which flourished in the 3rd century CE, is a philosophical system that builds upon the teachings of Plato and incorporates metaphysical elements. Plotinus, the founder of Neoplatonism, articulated a vision of reality that centers on a hierarchical structure of existence. At the pinnacle of this hierarchy is the One, an ineffable and transcendent principle from which all reality emanates. The One generates the Nous (Divine Mind), which in turn produces the World Soul.

The World Soul in Neoplatonism functions as an intermediary between the intelligible realm (the realm of the Forms) and the sensible world (the material universe). Plotinus describes the World Soul as the vital force that animates and organizes the cosmos, imbuing it with life and intelligence. It is both one and many, maintaining unity while simultaneously generating individual souls and entities within the cosmos.

Proclus, a prominent later Neoplatonist, further developed these ideas. He posited a more elaborate structure, with the World Soul divided into a higher, more divine aspect and a lower, more material aspect. This dual nature allows the World Soul to mediate between the purely intellectual and the physical realms, ensuring the coherence and order of the universe.

The Neoplatonists viewed the World Soul not only as a metaphysical principle but also as a means to achieve personal and cosmic harmony. By aligning one's soul with the World Soul, individuals could attain a higher state of being and participate in the divine order of the cosmos. This process involves philosophical contemplation, ethical living, and the cultivation of virtues that reflect the harmonious nature of the World Soul.

The influence of Neoplatonism extended beyond the classical period, significantly impacting early Christian, Islamic, and Renaissance thought. The integration of Platonic and Neoplatonic ideas into Christian theology, particularly through the works of Augustine and Pseudo-Dionysius, demonstrates the enduring legacy of the concept of the World Soul.

== Medieval and Renaissance thought ==
=== Scholasticism ===
During the 12th-Century Renaissance of the High Middle Ages, the analysis of Plato's Timaeus by members of the School of Chartres like William of Conches and Bernardus Silvestris led them to interpret the world soul as possibly or certainly the same as the Christian Holy Spirit under the covering (integumentum) of another name. As or immediately after Peter Abelard was condemned by Bernard of Clairvaux and the 1141 Council of Sens for doctrines similarly close to pantheism, William of Conches condemned his own writings on the subject and revised his De Philosophia Mundi to avoid its discussion.

=== Hermeticism ===
Hermeticism, a spiritual, philosophical, and esoteric tradition based primarily on writings attributed to Hermes Trismegistus, integrates the concept of the world soul into its cosmological framework. The Hermetic tradition, which flourished in the Hellenistic period and saw a revival during the Renaissance, views the world soul as a vital, animating force that permeates and unites the cosmos.

Hermetic writings, particularly the Corpus Hermeticum and the Asclepius, emphasize the unity and interconnection of all things in the universe. These texts describe the cosmos as a living being imbued with a divine spirit or soul. The world soul is seen as the intermediary between the divine intellect (Nous) and the material world, ensuring the harmonious functioning of the cosmos.

In the Corpus Hermeticum, the world soul is often depicted as an emanation of the divine that sustains all creation. This soul is responsible for the life, order, and movement within the universe, acting in accordance with the divine will. The Hermetic worldview is deeply rooted in the idea that understanding and aligning oneself with the world soul can lead to spiritual enlightenment and union with the divine.

==== Paracelsus ====
The Renaissance alchemist and physician Paracelsus significantly contributed to the Hermetic tradition by integrating the concept of the world soul into his medical and alchemical theories. Paracelsus believed that the world soul, which he referred to as the Archeus, was the vital force that governed the processes of nature and the human body. He posited that health and disease were influenced by the balance and interaction of this vital force within individuals.

Paracelsus' view of the world soul extended to his understanding of the macrocosm and microcosm, where the human body (microcosm) is a reflection of the larger universe (macrocosm). By studying the world soul's manifestations in nature, Paracelsus believed that alchemists and physicians could uncover the secrets of health and transformation.

==== Giordano Bruno ====
Giordano Bruno, a 16th-century Italian philosopher, theologian, and occultist, significantly contributed to the Renaissance revival of the Hermetic tradition. His work is known for its bold integration of Hermeticism, Copernican heliocentrism, and an infinite universe theory, which brought the concept of the world soul into a new, expansive context.

Bruno's cosmology was groundbreaking in that it proposed an infinite universe populated by innumerable worlds. Central to this vision was the idea of the world soul, or anima mundi, which Bruno described as an immanent and animating force pervading the entire cosmos. He argued that the world soul is the source of all motion, life, and intelligence in the universe, linking all parts of the cosmos into a single, living entity.

In his work De la causa, principio et uno (On Cause, Principle, and Unity), Bruno articulated his belief in the unity of the universe and the presence of a single, universal spirit. This spirit, akin to the world soul, ensures the cohesion and harmony of the cosmos, reflecting the Hermetic principle of the interconnectedness of all things.

Bruno was deeply influenced by the Hermetic texts, particularly the Corpus Hermeticum, which he saw as containing profound truths about the nature of the universe and the divine. His philosophy integrated the Hermetic concept of the world soul with the revolutionary scientific ideas of his time, leading to a vision of the cosmos that was both mystical and rational.

Bruno's emphasis on the world soul can also be seen in his metaphysical poetry and dialogues, where he often depicted the universe as a divine, living organism animated by an internal spirit. This perspective was revolutionary, challenging the Aristotelian view of a finite, hierarchical cosmos and aligning more closely with the Hermetic and Neoplatonic traditions.

Bruno's radical ideas, including his support for the Copernican model and his concept of an infinite universe with a pervasive world soul, led to his persecution by the Roman Catholic Church. He was tried for heresy and ultimately burned at the stake in 1600. Despite his tragic end, Bruno's ideas significantly influenced later thinkers and contributed to the development of modern cosmology and metaphysics.

==== Robert Fludd ====
Another key figure in Hermeticism, Robert Fludd, elaborated on the concept of the world soul in his extensive writings on cosmology and metaphysics. Fludd's works depict the world soul as the divine anima mundi that connects all levels of existence, from the highest spiritual realms to the material world. He emphasized the idea of cosmic harmony, where the world soul orchestrates the symphony of creation, maintaining balance and order.

Fludd's illustrations and writings highlight the Hermetic belief in the interconnection of all things, with the world soul as the binding principle that ensures the unity of the cosmos. His work reflects the Hermetic conviction that by attuning oneself to the world soul, one can achieve deeper knowledge and spiritual enlightenment.

== Later European philosophers ==
Although the concept of a world soul originated in classical antiquity, similar ideas can be found in the thoughts of later European philosophers such as those of Baruch Spinoza, Gottfried Leibniz, Immanuel Kant, Friedrich Schelling, and Georg W.F. Hegel (particularly in his concept of Weltgeist).

== Modern relevance ==
The concept of Anima Mundi, or the World Soul, continues to resonate in contemporary philosophical, ecological, and spiritual discourse. Modern interpretations often explore the interconnectedness of life and the universe, reflecting ancient notions through new lenses.

=== Ecological perspectives ===
In contemporary environmental philosophy, the idea of Anima Mundi is often invoked to emphasize the intrinsic value of nature and the interconnectedness of all living things. Ecologists and environmentalists draw parallels between the ancient concept and modern holistic approaches to ecology. James Lovelock's Gaia hypothesis posits that the Earth functions as a self-regulating system, echoing the idea of the World Soul animating and organizing the cosmos. This holistic view suggests that recognizing the Earth as a living entity can foster a deeper environmental ethic and a sense of stewardship for the planet.

=== Philosophical and scientific discourse ===
Philosophers like David Abram have explored the phenomenological aspects of Anima Mundi in the context of sensory experience and perception. Abram's work emphasizes the animate qualities of the natural world, suggesting that recognizing the Earth's sentience can foster a deeper ecological awareness and a sense of kinship with all forms of life. Additionally, systems thinking and complexity theory in science reflect a renewed interest in holistic and integrative approaches that resonate with the concept of the World Soul, highlighting the interconnection and interdependence of various components within ecological and social systems.

=== Spiritual and New Age movements ===
The Anima Mundi also finds relevance in modern spiritual and New Age movements, where it is often associated with the idea of a living, conscious Earth. Practices such as Earth-centered spirituality, animism, and certain strands of neopaganism embrace the notion of the World Soul as a guiding principle for living in harmony with nature. These movements emphasize rituals, meditations, and practices aimed at connecting with the spirit of the Earth and recognizing the sacredness of all life.

=== Literature and the arts ===
The influence of the Anima Mundi extends into contemporary literature and the arts, serving as a metaphor for exploring themes of unity, interconnection, and the mystery of existence. Authors and artists draw on the symbolism of the World Soul to convey a sense of wonder and reverence for the natural world. This is evident in the works of poets like Mary Oliver, who often evoke the living essence of nature in their writings, and in the visual arts, where the interplay of life and the cosmos is a recurring theme.

==== Popular culture ====
Anima Mundi is also referenced in media like games, a notable example is in World of Warcraft.

== See also ==
- Classical theism
- Pachamama
- Panentheism
- Panpsychism
- Prima materia
- Process theology
- Spiritual ecology
- Unus mundus
