= Divine light =

Aspect of divine presence

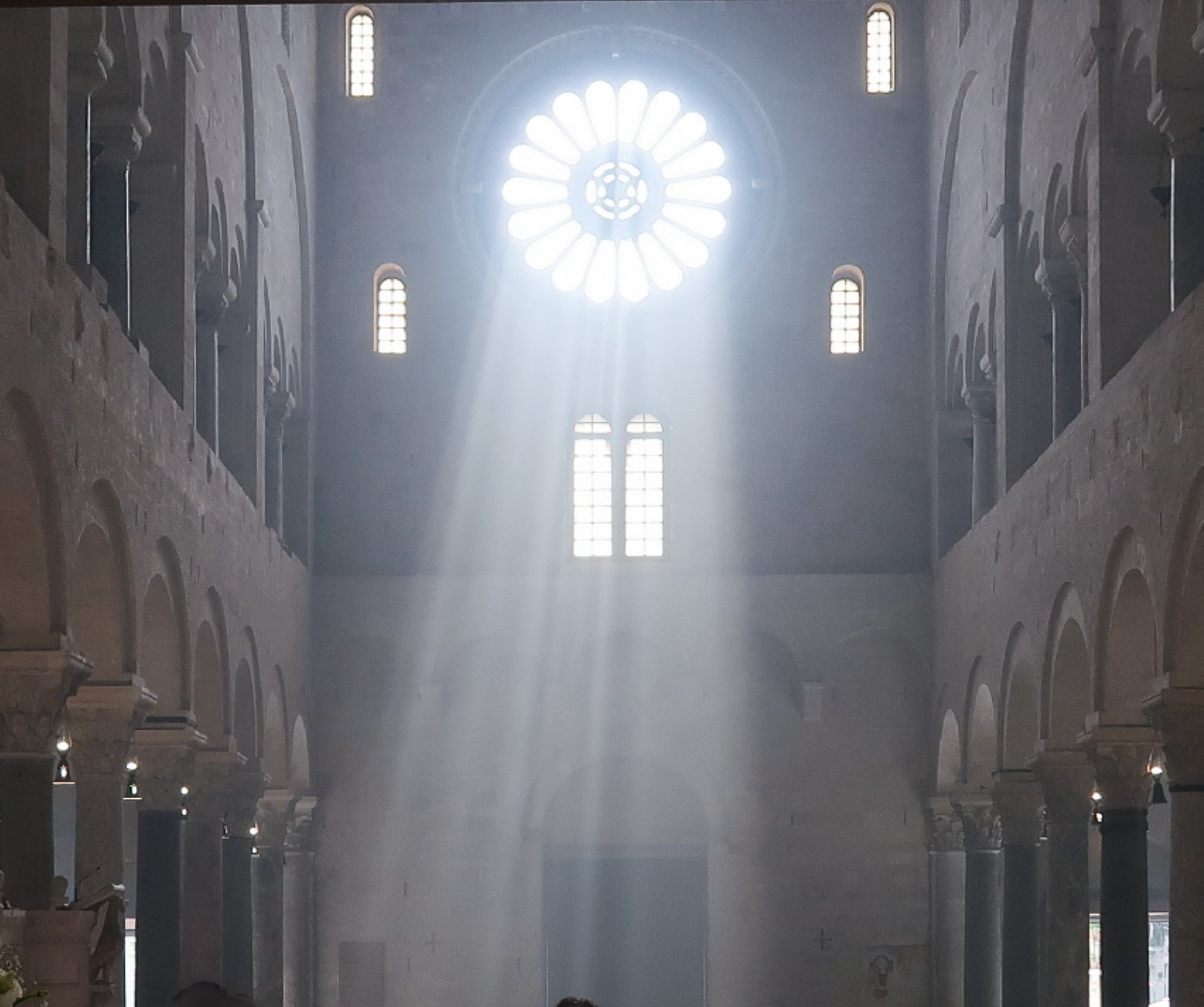
Effect of light from the rose window in Bari Cathedral, recurring in religious architecture to metaphorically allude to the spiritual light.

In religious philosophy, the divine light (also called divine radiance or divine refulgence) is an aspect of divine presence perceived as light during a theophany or vision, or represented as such in allegory or metaphor.

Light has always been associated with a religious and philosophical symbolic meaning, considered a source of not only physical but metaphysical illumination, as a metaphor for the revelation of a truth hidden in the shadows.

The value of light often recurs in history of philosophy, especially Neoplatonic, in the course of which it is understood both as a structural component of every being, including physical ones, and as a metaphor of spiritual light.

== Types and terms ==
The term "light" has been widely used in spirituality and religion, such as:

- An Nūr – Islamic term and concept, referenced in Surah an-Nur and Ayat an-Nur of the Quran.
- Inner light – Christian concept often associated with Quaker doctrine.
- Johrei – In various Japanese new religions such as the Church of World Messianity, it is a concept involving the interpersonal transmission of divine light. Mahikari movement religions also practices similar divine light transmission rituals.
- Jyoti or Jyot – a holy flame that is lit with cotton wicks and ghee or mustard oil. It is the prayer ritual of devotional worship performed by Hindus offer to the deities. Jyoti is also a representation of the divine light and a form of the Hindu goddess Durga shakti.
- Ohr Ein Sof – in Rabbinic Judaism and Kabbalah, meaning the "Infinite Light."
- Prakāśa – An Indic concept found in Buddhism and Hinduism which is related to the nature of consciousness
- Tabor Light – the uncreated light revealed to the apostles present during the Transfiguration of Jesus; also experienced as illumination on the path to theosis in Eastern Orthodox theology during theoria, a form of Christian contemplation.

== Buddhism ==
Buddhist scripture speaks of numerous Buddhas of light, including Amitābha (the Buddha of Boundless Light), a Buddha of Unimpeded Light, and the Buddhas of Unopposed Light, of Pure Light, of Incomparable Light, and of Unceasing Light.

== Christianity ==
Bible commentators such as John W. Ritenbaugh see the presence of light as a metaphor of truth, good and evil, knowledge, and ignorance. In the first Chapter of the Bible, Elohim is described as creating light by fiat and seeing the light to be good. John 1:5 also says that "God is light".

=== Eastern Orthodoxy ===
In the Eastern Orthodox tradition, the Divine Light illuminates the intellect of man through "theoria" or contemplation. In the Gospel of John, the opening verses describe God as Light: "In Him was life and the life was the light of men. And the light shines in the darkness and the darkness did not comprehend it" (John 1:5).

In John 8:12, Christ proclaims "I am the light of the world", bringing the Divine Light to mankind. The Tabor Light, also called the Uncreated Light, was revealed to the three apostles present at the Transfiguration.

=== Quakers ===
Quakers, known formally as the Religious Society of Friends, are generally united by a belief in each human's ability to experience the light within or see "that of God in every one". Most Quakers believe in continuing revelation: that God continuously reveals truth directly to individuals. George Fox said, "Christ has come to teach His people Himself." Veronika Koller explains liberal Quakers also see light as a revelation: "Quakers need to be open to 'a new light', i.e. continuing revelation". Friends often focus on feeling the presence of God. As Isaac Penington wrote in 1670, "It is not enough to hear of Christ, or read of Christ, but this is the thing – to feel him to be my root, my life, and my foundation..." Quakers reject the idea of priests, believing in the priesthood of all believers. Some express their concept of God using phrases such as "the inner light", "inward light of Christ", or "Holy Spirit". A core belief of Quakers is, "all can be saved, through the direct relationship established by God in Christ with ‘every [person] that cometh into the world [...]’ ". Quakers first gathered around George Fox in the mid-17th century and belong to a historically Protestant Christian set of denominations.

=== Mystical Christianity ===
St. Augustine describes his experience of the divine light in Confessions as "...the immutable light higher than my mind—not the light of every day, obvious to anyone, nor a larger version of the same kind which would, as it were, have given out a much brighter light and filled everything with its magnitude. It was not that light, but a different thing, utterly different from all our kinds of light. It transcended my mind, not in the way that oil floats on water, nor as heaven is above earth. It was superior because it made me, and I was inferior because I was made by it. The person who knows the truth knows it, and he who knows it knows eternity. Love knows it. Eternal truth and true love and beloved eternity: you are my God."

Several Christian mystics throughout the Middle Ages have also expressed God in terms of light, and no one more famously than San Juan de la Cruz (St. John of the Cross). His poems Noche Oscura and Llama de Amor Viva (The Dark Night and The Living Flame of Love, respectively), as well as his discourses The Ascent of Mount Carmel and The Dark Night, both heavily employ metaphors of light and darkness in order to express San Juan's mystical theology.

In "The Flowing Light of the Godhead," Mechthild of Magdeburg describes her mystical experiences.

== Hinduism ==
In Hinduism, Diwali—the festival of lights—is a celebration of the victory of light over darkness. A mantra in Bṛhadāraṇyaka Upaniṣad (1.3.28) urges to God: "from darkness, lead us unto light". The Rig Veda includes nearly two dozen hymns to the dawn and its goddess, Ushas.

=== Sant Mat ===
In the terminology of Sant Mat, light and sound are the two main expressions of God.

== Manichaeism ==
Manichaeism, the most widespread Western religion prior to Christianity, was based on the belief that God was, literally, light. From about 250-350 CE, devout Manichaeans followed the teachings of self-proclaimed prophet Mani. Mani's faithful, who could be found from Greece to China, believed in warring kingdoms of Light and Darkness, in "beings of light," and in a Father of Light who would conquer the demons of darkness and remake the earth through shards of light found in human souls. Manichaeism also co-opted other religions, including Buddhist teachings in its scripture and worshiping Jesus the Luminous who was crucified on a cross of pure light.

Among the many followers of Manichaeism was the young Augustine, who later wrote, "I thought that you, Lord God and Truth, were like a luminous body of immense size, and myself a bit of that body." When he converted to Christianity in 386 CE, Augustine denounced Manichaeism. By then, Manichaeism had been supplanted by ascendant Christianity.

Manichaeism's legacy is the word Manichaean—relating to a dualistic view of the world, dividing things into either good or evil, light or dark, black or white.

== Neoplatonism ==
In On the Mysteries of the Egyptians, Chaldeans, and Assyrians, Iamblichus refers to the divine light as the manifestation of the gods by which divination, theurgy, and other forms of ritual are accomplished.

== Hermeticism ==
The almost every of the 16 or so books of the Corpus Hermeticum makes more or less use of the analogy of light in their expressions of the Divine. Nous (Mind of Reason) as related the Logos (Word of God) is often also spoken of in terms conveying a sense of brightness and radiance.

Several aspects of the Corpus' creation stories have set the Divine light as both pre-existing and as the catalyst for the separation of the elements which comprise the physical world: "Out of the light came forth the Holy Word which entered into the watery substance, and pure fire leapt from the watery substance and rose up; the fire was insubstantial, piercing and active. The air, being light[weight], followed the breath, and mounted up til it reached the fire, away from earth and water, so that it seemed to be suspended from the fire" (1.5).

Additionally, this light was crucial to the creation of humankind. "Nous, God, being male and female, beginning as life and light, gave birth by the Word to another Nous, the Creator of the world... Nous, the Father of all, who is life and light, brought forth Man, the same as himself, whom he loved as his own child; for Man was very beautiful, bearing the image of his Father... From life and light, Man became soul and Nous—from life, soul, and from light, Nous..." (1.9, 12, 17).

Of a human's ability to witness this light, it is said to "[p]ray that through grace you will be able to perceive God as so great that even just one ray of Him may shine in your mind" (5.2), and that "[i]t does not, like the rays of the sun, which are fiery, blaze on the eyes and make them close. This is the vision of the Supreme Good; it shines forth in such a way that the man who has the power can as far as possible perceive the flowing light of pure perception" (10.4).

See especially Books I (Poimandres), V, X, XI, XIII, and XVI.

== Zoroastrianism ==
Light is a core concept in Iranian mysticism. The root of this thought lies in Zoroastrian beliefs, which define the supreme God, Ahura Mazda, as the source of light. This essential attribute is manifested in various schools of thought in Persian mysticism and philosophy. Later, this notion was dispersed across the entire Middle East, shaping the paradigms of religions and philosophies emerging in the region. After the Arab invasion, this concept was incorporated into Islamic teachings by Iranian thinkers, the most famous of them being Shahab al-Din Suhrawardi, the founder of the illumination philosophy.

== See also ==
- Black-and-white dualism – Metaphorical contrast of white and black
- Body of light – Hermetic starfire body
- Emanationism – Belief that all things derive from a first reality
- Inner light – Quaker religious concept
- World of Light – Heavenly realm in Mandaeism
