= Jesus in Manichaeism =

Jesus as portrayed in Manichaeism

Jesus (夷數)
- God of Salvation; God of Light; God of the Moon
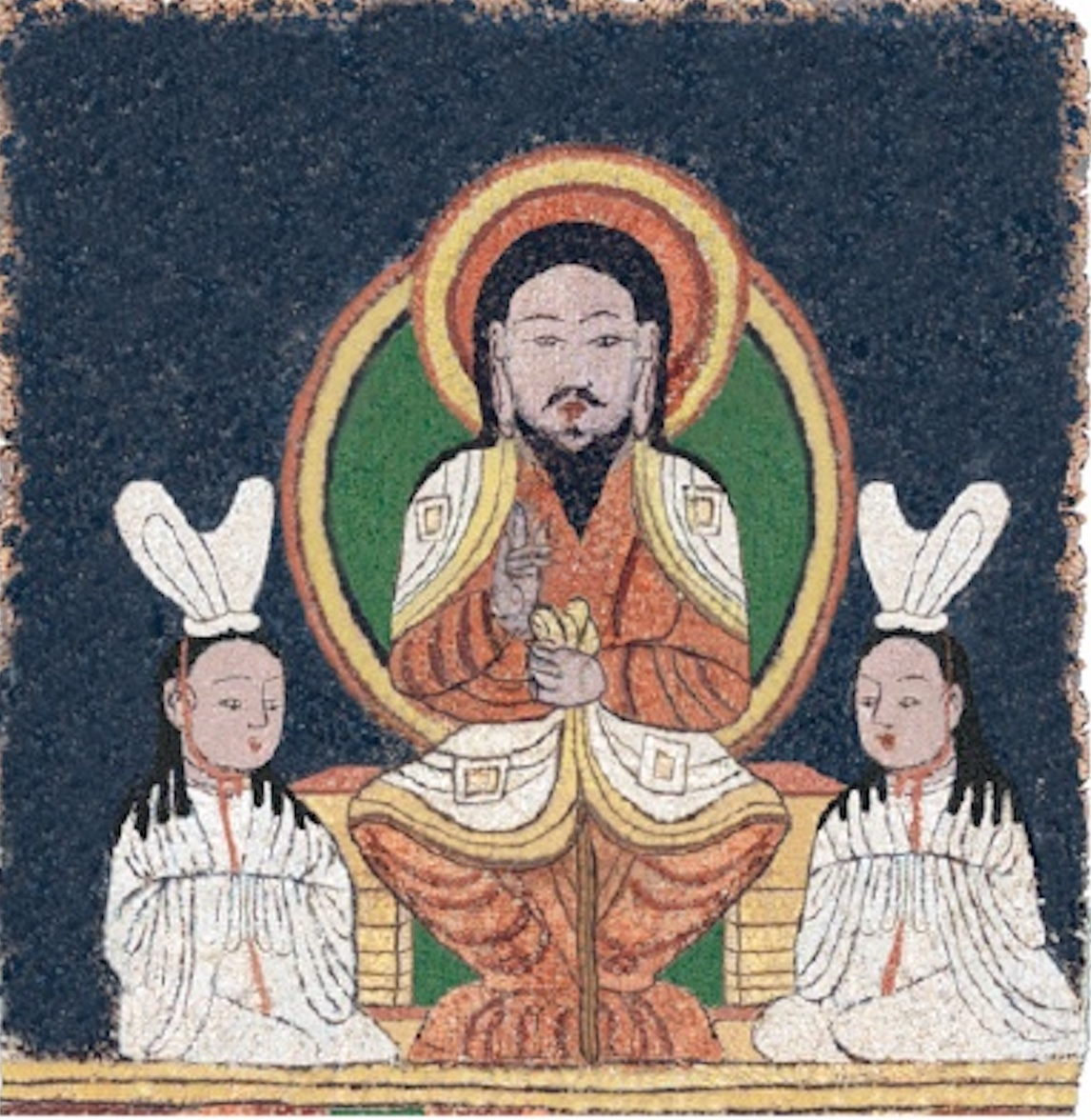
- Portrait of the King Jesus, 10th century. Found in Xinjiang Gaochang, it is the oldest known Manichean Jesus portrait.
- Other names: Jesus of Light (光明夷數); Jesus the Splendour (夷數精和); Jesus the Buddha of Harmony (夷數和佛)
- Predecessor: Śākyamuni Buddha (釋迦文佛)
- Successor: Mani the Buddha of Light (摩尼光佛)
- Abodes: World of Light (明界), Moon Palace (月宮)
- Symbol: cross of light, moon
- Ethnic group: Hebrew
- Parents: Father of Greatness

Equivalents
- Christian: Jesus
- Islamic: ʿĪsā ibn Maryam

In Manichaeism, Jesus (Romanization of Parthian and Pahlavi: Yyšw '[Yišō]) is considered one of the four prophets of the faith, along with Zoroaster, Gautama Buddha and Mani. He is also a "guiding deity" who greets the light bodies of the righteous after their deliverance.

Before the introduction of Manichaeism to Central Asia, the number of prophets recognized by it was undetermined. After being introduced to Central Asia, it was determined to be five, that is, the above-mentioned four prophets plus the Hindu god Narayana, because Hinduism had significant influence in ancient Central Asia.

Mani, the founder of the church, grew up in a Christian family in the 3rd century AD. His father Pātik was a believer in the church. They lived in southern Mesopotamia under the rule of the Sasanian Dynasty. Although Mani mentions Zoroastrianism and Sakyamuni in his own writings, Jesus is the key point. For example: "Jesus is Mani's savior"; "Mani, the apostle of Jesus Christ" (Mani's crystal seal and his own name in the letter); "Mani is the Holy Spirit of Jesus" (Mani's disciples' honorific title to him). Church Father Augustine once wrote about the Manichaeans' obsession with Jesus and there are many hymns in the Manichaean scriptures in various languages.

== Jesus and Mani ==
Mani was exposed to various forms of Christianity in southern Mesopotamia in the third century, and Jesus formed an important component in his teachings. Mani grew up in a Judeo-Christian community of the Elcesaites and had contact with other Christian groups, such as the Bardesanists and Marcionists. In this western region of the Sassanid Empire, Zoroastrianism was significantly less dominant than in the central provinces. The cosmopolitan and multi-ethnic environment of late ancient Mesopotamia allowed the well-educated Mani to consider the teachings of other prophets in relation to his own. While also Zoroaster and the historical Buddha were commented upon, Jesus received the most attention in Mani's writings. Mani's ties to Jesus are divided into three main themes: "Jesus as Mani's personal savior" (as seen in the Cologne Manichaean Codex (en)), "Mani as the Apostle of Jesus Christ" (as seen in the Mani's crystal seal and as a self-designation in his letters), and "Mani as the paraclete of Jesus" (as seen in the designations of his disciples). In a sermon preserved in a Coptic translation from 4th century Egypt, Mani summarizes the life of Jesus.

Various sources confirm that themes of Christian origin, especially the figure of Jesus, continue to be significant throughout Manichean history. Augustine's writings document the Manichean devotion to Jesus. Manichean hymns to Jesus are preserved in a variety of languages, especially Coptic from 4th century Egypt and, to a lesser extent, Parthian, Sogdian, Middle Persian, and Uighur, from Karakhoja in the 8th to 11th centuries, and even Middle Chinese, 8th century North China. This wealth of Jesus themes, especially in the western part of the Manichaean world, led to a Christian reading of Manichaeism that dominated early studies of this religion. Today, opinions on the origin of Manichaeism are divided into two opposing interpretations, according to which Manichaeism originated in Zoroastrianism with strong Christian influences or, vice versa, in Christianity with strong Zoroastrian influences. No matter which of these two traditional views is held, there is no doubt that the subjects of Jesus were an integral part of Manichaeism.

== In Manichaean thought ==
In original Christian usage, Jesus's proper name (traditionally interpreted as "Yahweh is the help") may or may not be accompanied by the epithet Christ or Messiah, but Christ was also used alone, as if it were a name in itself. By using such epithets, the Fathers of the early church expressed their conviction that Jesus had fulfilled the hope of an eschatological redeemer.

In Gnostic teachings, on the other hand, there was a strong tendency to separate the earthly Jesus, that is, the man Jesus of Nazareth, from the heavenly Christ, the cosmic saviour, a distinction that may already have been foreshadowed in the Judeo-Christian community of the Elcesaites, in which Mani grew up with the idea of a cosmic Jesus suffering on land and in water. The Christian notion of the unique sacrifice of Jesus is not found in Manichaeism, and therefore it appears that Jesus was not essential to Manichean doctrine. In reality, however, he was one of the most popular figures in Manichean writings and at least six different aspects can be distinguished, all of which were of great importance to Manichean beliefs and worship.

== Six identities of Jesus ==
Yeshua (In Greek: "Iēsoûs"; Latin: "Iesus"; English: "Jesus") was originally a common name in ancient Palestine; Christos is a title of Koine Greek origin meaning "anointed", which is a loose translation of the Hebrew title Messiah. The Church Fathers used the combination of the two, Iēsoûs Christos, indicating that Christianity fully affirms that Jesus is the Messiah, i.e. the saviour promised to the Jews in the Bible. In contrast, Gnosticism, with its dualist theology, tends to clearly distinguish the historical Jesus and Christ as God. In Manichaeism, three separate identities of Jesus are distinguished, which are sometimes distinguished further by historians to enumerate at least six distinct aspects of Jesus all of which were of great importance for Manichean belief and worship.

=== Jesus the Luminous ===
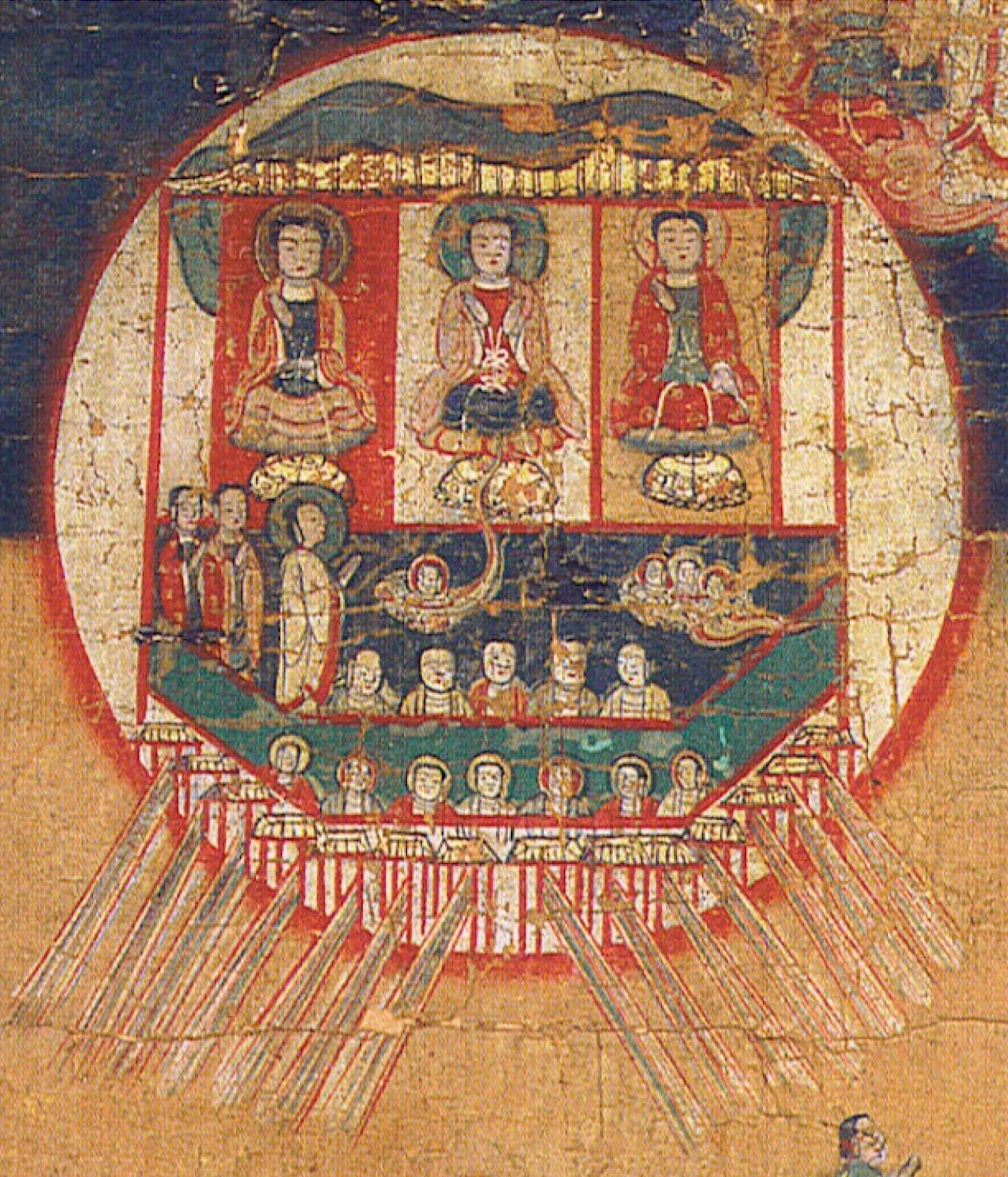
The moon palace depicted as a ship in the "Manichaean Universe Diagram", Yuan dynasty. From left to right: The Virgin of Light (謹你嚧詵); Jesus the Luminous (光明夷數); the First Enthymesis (先意); Beneath them, five angels gathering souls and seven navigators row in front; Mani wearing a white robe stands on their left as an observer.

Jesus the Luminous (Yišōʿ zīwā; also translated as Jesus the Shining, Jesus the Splendour, and Jesus the Radiance) is the pre-existent aspect of Jesus in Manichaeism, comparable to the eternal Logos in Christianity. He brings knowledge about the secrets of the past, the present and prophecy of the future on one hand, and the ability to differentiate between good and evil towards humanity, on the other. As Jesus the Luminous his primary role was as a revealer and guide; accordingly, it was Jesus the Luminous who awoke Adam revealed to him the divine origins of his soul and its painful captivity by the body and mixture with matter. Accordingly, it is also Jesus who frees Adam and advises him to eat from the Tree of knowledge to escape the prison of the Prince of Darkness.

This aspect of Jesus is the saviour who redeems the light imprisoned in man; the redemptive Intelligence, the Great Nous, is the emanation of him. Jesus the Luminous is one of the redeeming deities of the "third evocation" (a series of deities evoked by the Father of Greatness for the purpose of salvation) and is regarded as an emanation of the Third Messenger, the first member of the third evocation, but, due to its great importance and multiple functions, its position in the divine hierarchy is sometimes represented differently, for example, as Son of Greatness (that is, of the Father of Greatness) or Son of the first man (second member of the "first evocation").

He is the Great Wisdom, who is responsible for saving the light molecules imprisoned in the human body. He is the third messenger summoned by the supreme deity of Manichaeism to save the world. The Third Messenger's act of salvation made the demons anxious and fearful of losing control of the light element, so they created Adam and Eve, the original human ancestors, and imprisoned the light in the human body as a soul. The Light was able to convey to Adam the spiritual knowledge of salvation in order to awaken the sunken souls of humans. But Adam was tempted by Eve to give birth to Cain, Abel and Seth, resulting in the failure of salvation. As mankind continues to reproduce, the soul is subjected to the flesh, and the light element cannot escape from the confinement of the Prince of Darkness.

=== Jesus the Child ===
Jesus the Child is described as an emanation of Jesus the Luminous with a close relationship to the Suffering Jesus, identified with the embodiment of the soul's will to redemption.

=== Jesus the Moon ===
As Jesus the Luminous has his cosmic seat on the moon, at least in popular belief, the moon itself is identified with Jesus the Luminous. A Sogdian text contains the phrase "at night when Jesus [the moon] rose."

=== Jesus the Risen ===
The Risen Jesus, or eschatological Jesus, is prophesied to rule over humanity for 120 years after his final judgment and before the great conflagration purifies the remaining redeemable light. From the Coptic sermon on the Great War, in which Jesus the Luminous is depicted as rendering the Last Judgment, it is clear that the aspect of the Risen Jesus was closely related to that of Jesus the Luminous.

=== Jesus the Messiah ===
Jesus the Messiah was the historical Jesus of Nazareth who was identified as the prophet of the Jews and the forerunner of Mani who proclaimed the truth and performed miracles. The Manichaeans upheld a monophysite, docetic Christology, believing that he was wholly divine only, having only a spiritual body and not a material one, although appearing on earth as an apostle of light with a human appearance. Consequently, he never experienced human birth, but was truly born only at his baptism, as it was on that occasion that the Father openly acknowledged his sonship. Christ's changing form and appearance was identified as a "mystery", recalling Augustine's description of Christ's mystica passio. The suffering, death, and resurrection of Jesus the Messiah was in appearance only, exemplary of the suffering and eventual deliverance of the human soul but of no salvific value in itself, although it prefigured Mani's own martyrdom.

=== Jesus the Suffering ===
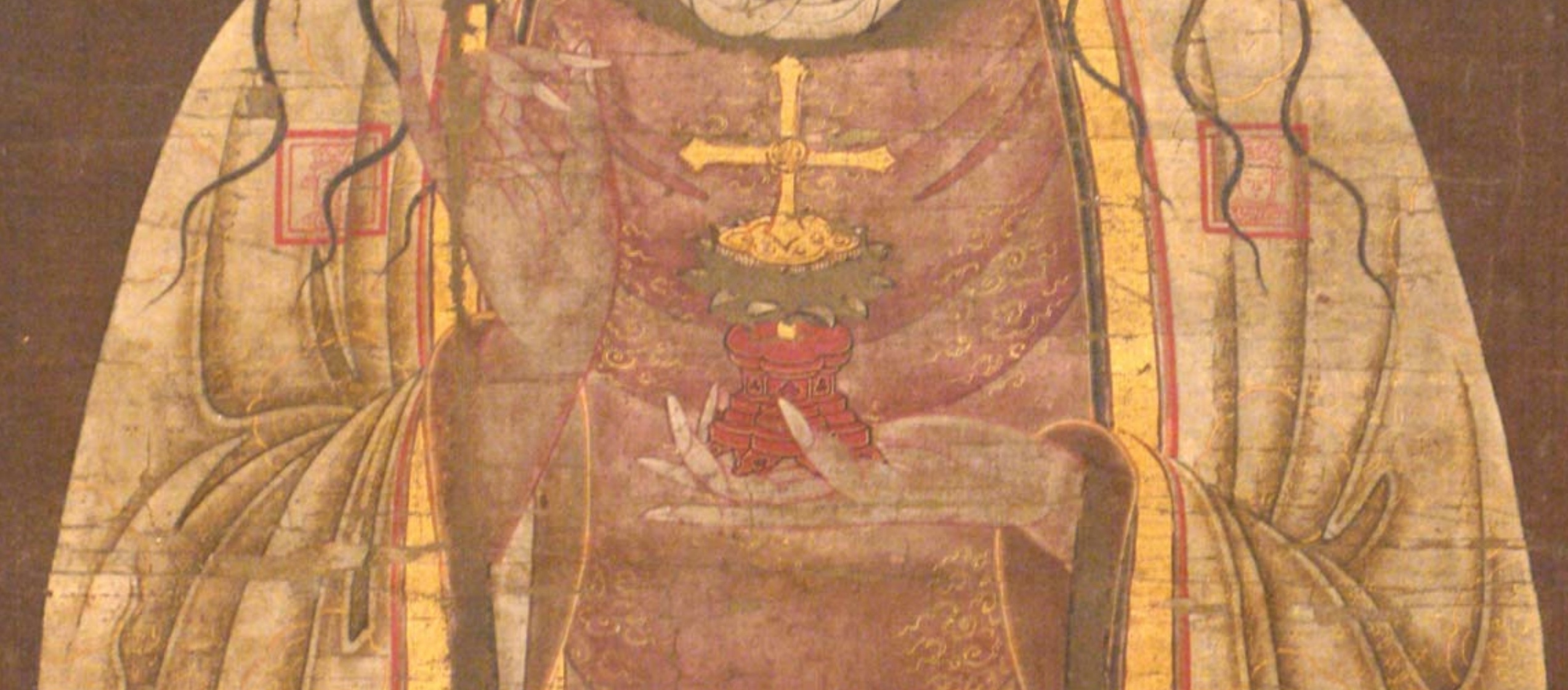
The cross of light depicted in the details of the Southern Song Dynasty "Manichaean Painting of the Buddha Jesus" is placed on the Zhu Honglian platform.

Suffering Jesus (Jesus patibilis) is identical to the World Soul and the Living Self, which is the light that is imprisoned in matter; like the historical Jesus, he is depicted crucified in the world. The pain suffered by the imprisoned light was understood to be real and imminent, not merely metaphorical. This constant and universal suffering of the captive soul is expressed in the crucifixion of the Suffering Jesus, who was the "life and salvation of Man", on the cross of light on which he was suspended. This mystica cruxificio was present not only in every tree, herb, fruit, and vegetable, but even in the stones and the soil of the Earth, as described in the Coptic Manichaean psalms.

=== Summary ===
All the aspects of Jesus in Manichaeism can be summed up by a unified concept of a cosmic, suffering and world-saving, "redeemed redeemer" figure. Through these aspects, Jesus became an omnipresent and ubiquitous figure in Manichaeism cosmology. However, in each of his aspects Jesus may be represented by more precise mythological entities: Jesus the Luminous by the Great Nous, Suffering Jesus by the World Soul, Jesus the Child by the Enthymesis of Life, Jesus the Moon by the brilliance of the moon, and so on.

== In Kephalaia literature ==
=== The Kephalaia of the Teacher ===
While Jesus is only rarely called Jesus the Splendour in other Manichaean writings, he is commonly called as such in the Kephalaia of the Teacher. In the Kephalaia, Jesus is an emanation of the Father of Greatness and apparently identical with the Third Envoy and the living word, brought forth to restore the damage done by the rebellion of the Archons. When Jesus the Splendour descends to the earth, he later takes on the shape of flesh to manifest himself in the material world.

== In the 'Praise Jesus' text ==
After Manichaeism was introduced into China, because the image of Jesus was quite unfamiliar to Chinese culture, missionaries combined it with Buddhist culture, called Jesus Buddha, and gave him a model of great mercy and relief. Buddhist image. Therefore, believers wrote in the following excerpt from the hymn "Praise Jesus Text", which is like a Buddhist scripture in the Chinese Manichaean hymn scroll:

The Buddha-Jesus, who is the most powerful and compassionate person in the world, forgives my sins.
Listen to my painful words and lead me out of the sea of poisonous fire. I wish to give the fragrant water of liberation, the twelve jeweled crowns and the drapes. To cleanse me from the dust of my wonderful nature, and to adorn my pure body to make it upright. May I be rid of the three winters and three poisonous knots, and the six thieves and six poisonous winds. Let the great dharma spring glorify my nature, and let the trees of nature and flowers flourish. May the great waves of fire and the dark clouds and fogs be quenched. Let the great dharma day shine brightly, so that my mind may always be pure. May I be relieved of the disease of dumbness and blindness, and of the monsters and devils. Send down the great Dharma medicine for speedy healing, and silence the divine incantation to drive away the spirits. I have been subjected to so many obstacles and countless other hardships. In view of this, the great sage should forgive me and save me from all the disasters.
May Jesus have mercy on me and free me from all demonic bonds.

== See also ==
- Christology
- Logos (Christianity)
- Jesuism
- Jesus in Islam
- Docetism
- Xiapu Manichaean manuscripts
- Yesseus Mazareus Yessedekeus in Sethianism
