= List of awards and nominations received by Asha Bhosle =

Asha Bhosle awards and nominations
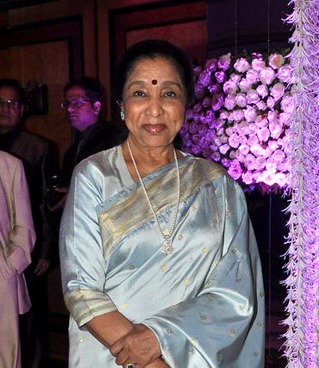
- Asha Bhosle at Sunidhi Chauhan's wedding reception
Awards and nominations
Award	Wins	Nominations
Filmfare Awards	9	20
Grammy Awards	0	2
Bengal Film Journalists' Association Awards	4	4
Maharashtra State Film Awards	18	18
IIFA	1	1
Screen Awards	1	1
Zee Cine	1	1
Mirchi Music	1	1

Totals (Note: Certain award groups do not simply award one winner. They acknowledge several different recipients, have runners-up, and have third place. Since this is a specific recognition and is different from losing an award, runner-up mentions are considered wins in this award tally. For simplification and to avoid errors, each award in this list has been presumed to have had a prior nomination.)
- Wins: 76
- Nominations: 89

Asha Bhosle (born 8 September 1933) is an Indian singer who has recorded numerous songs throughout her career. This is a complete list of awards and recognitions she has won.

== Filmfare Awards ==
Asha Bhosle has won seven Filmfare Awards for Best Female Playback Singer out of 18 nominations. She won her first two awards in 1967 and 1968, when her elder sister Lata Mangeshkar still used to accept the award (Lata Mangeshkar asked not to be considered for the award nominations after 1969 to promote new talent.) After receiving the award in 1979, Asha Bhosle emulated her sister and requested that her name not be considered for the nominations hereafter. Despite this, she is the most frequent winner of this award to date, tying with Alka Yagnik. She was later given a Special Award for Rangeela Lifetime Achievement Award in 2001.

Year	Category	Song/Nomination	Result
1967	Best Playback Singer (Female)	Garibon Ki Suno– Dus Lakh	Won
1969	Best Playback Singer (Female)	Parde Mein Rehne Do – Shikar	Won
1972	Best Playback Singer (Female)	Zindegi Ek Safar Hain Suhana – Andaz	Nominated
1972	Best Playback Singer (Female)	Piya Tu Ab Toh Aaja – Caravan	Won
1973	Best Playback Singer (Female)	Dum Maro Dum – Hare Rama Hare Krishna	Won
1974	Best Playback Singer (Female)	Jab Andhera Hota Hain - Raja Rani	Nominated
1974	Best Playback Singer (Female)	Hungama Ho Gaya - Anhonee	Nominated
1974	Best Playback Singer (Female)	Hone Lagi Hain Raat Jawan – Naina	Won
1975	Best Playback Singer (Female)	Achchhe Samay Par Tum - Bidaai	Nominated
1975	Best Playback Singer (Female)	Yeh Hawas Hai Tu Kya Jaane – Hawas	Nominated
1975	Best Playback Singer (Female)	Chori Chori Sola Singar - Manoranjan	Nominated
1975	Best Playback Singer (Female)	Chainse Humko Kabhi – Pran Jaye Par Vachan Na Jaye	Won
1976	Best Playback Singer (Female)	Kal Ke Apne – Amanush	Nominated
1976	Best Playback Singer (Female)	Sapna Mera Toot Gaya - Khel Khel Mein	Nominated
1977	Best Playback Singer (Female)	I Love You – Barood	Nominated
1978	Best Playback Singer (Female)	Layee Kahan Hai Zindagi – Taxi Taxie	Nominated
1979	Best Playback Singer (Female)	O Sathi Re - Muqaddar Ka Sikandar	Nominated
1979	Best Playback Singer (Female)	Yeh Mera Dil – Don	Won
1996	Filmfare Special Award	songs of Rangeela	Won
2001	Filmfare Lifetime Achievement Award		Won

== National Film Awards ==
National Film Award for Best Female Playback Singer - 1981 for "Dil Cheez Kya Hai" from Umrao Jaan

National Film Award for Best Female Playback Singer - 1987 for "Mera Kuch Samaan" from Ijaazat

== Bengal Film Journalists' Association (BFJA) Award ==
Year	Category	Film	Result
1966	BFJA Award for Best Female Playback Singer (Hindi)	Waqt	Won
1967	BFJA Award for Best Female Playback Singer (Hindi)	Teesri Kasam	Won
1971	BFJA Award for Best Female Playback Singer (Bengali)	Megh Kalo	Won
1987	BFJA Award for Best Female Playback Singer (Hindi)	Ek Pal	Won

== Maharashtra State Film Awards ==
Asha Bhosle was the greatest playback singer in Marathi film industry. She had sung maximum songs in Marathi language. She was awarded "Maharashtra State Film Award for Best Female Playback Singer" a record 18 times.

== Other Awards ==
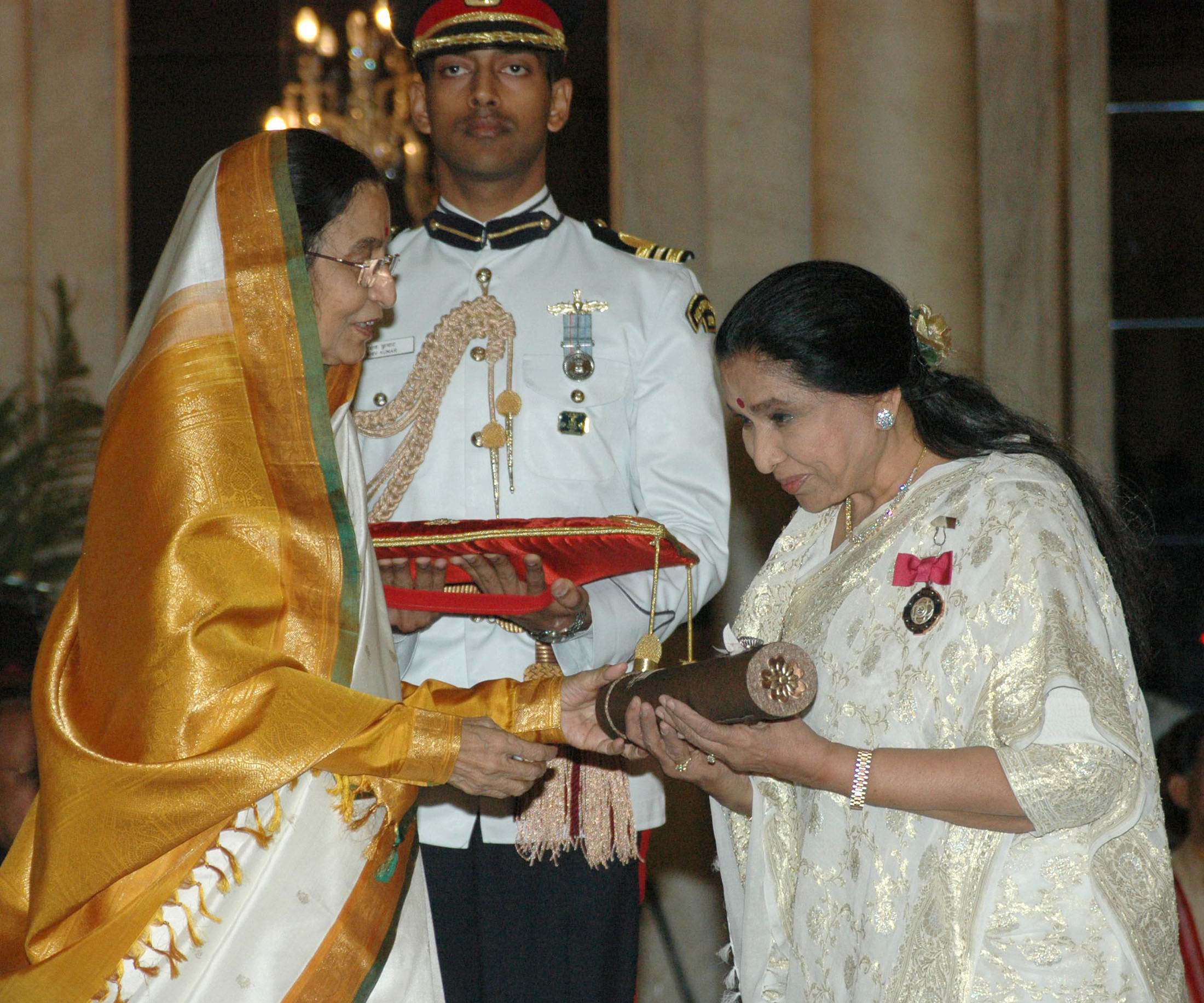
The President, Smt. Pratibha Devisingh Patil presenting the Padma Vibhushan to Dr.(Smt.) Asha Bhosle, famous playback singer, at an Investiture-I Ceremony, at Rashtrapati Bhavan, in New Delhi on May 05, 2008

1987 : Nightingale of Asia

1989 : Lata Mangeshkar Award by Madhya Pradesh Government

1997 : Grammy Award Nomination for Legacy with Ustad Ali Akbar Khan

1997 : Screen Videocon Award for Jaanam Samjha Karo

1997 : MTV Award for best playback singer for Jaanam Samjha Karo

1997 : Channel V Award for Jaanam Samjha Karo

1999 : Screen Award for Contribution to International Music

1999 : Lata Mangeshkar Award by Maharashtra Government

2000 : Dada Saheb Phalke Award

2000 : Singer Of the Millennium (Dubai)

2000 : Kolhapuri Bhushan Award

2000 : Sangli Bhushan Award

2000 : Omega Excellence Lifetime Achievement Award

2000 : Zee Gold Bollywood Award for Mujhe Rang De from Takshak

2001 : MTV Award for Kambakht Ishq

2001 : Dayawati Modi Award

2002 : Zee Cine - Hall Of Fame Award

2002 : Jeevan Gaurav Puraskar

2002 : Rajshree Shahu Puraskar

2002 : Zee Cine Award for Radha Kaise Na Jale from Lagaan

2002 : Screen Videocon Award for Radha Kaise Na Jale from Lagaan

2002 : Sansui Movie Award for Radha Kaise Na Jale from Lagaan

2002 : IIFA Award for Best Female Playback Singer

2002 : Star Screen Award for Best Female Playback Singer

2002 : BBC Lifetime Achievement Award (presented by the UK Prime Minister Tony Blair)

2003 : Swaralaya Yesudas Award for outstanding contributions to Indian music

2004 : Living Legend Award by the Federation of Indian Chamber of Commerce and Industry

2005 : MTV Immies, Best Female Pop Act for Aaj Jaane Ki Zid Na Karo.

2005 : Most Stylish People in Music

2006 : 48th Grammy Awards - 2006 - Grammy Award for Best Contemporary World Music Album - You've Stolen My Heart (nominated)

2008 : Padma Vibhushan Award

2011 : IIFA Life Time Achievement Award

2012 : 18th Annual Colour Screens Life Time Achievement Award

2012 : Mirchi Music Awards Lifetime Achievement Award

2013 : Pandit Hridaynath Lifetime Achievement Award

2014 : Music Living Legend Award by Global Indian Music Academy Awards (GiMA)

2014 : Lifetime Achievement Award for her contribution to Indian cinema at the Dubai International Film Festival (DIFF)

2018 : Yash Chopra Memorial Award

2018 : Deenanath Mangeshkar Award

2018 : Banga Bibhushan Award (Highest West Bengal Civilian Award)

2021 : Maharashtra Bhushan Award

== Honours and recognitions ==
- Honorary Doctorates from the University Of Amravati & Jalgaon in Literature.
- Asha Bhosle is the recipient of the first Doctor of Literature (D.Litt.) of the Jodhpur National University.
- Asha Bhosle has also received the Freddie Mercury Award.
- Asha Bhosle has received the Sur Singar Award.
- The Birmingham Film Festival paid her a special tribute in November 2002.
- Asha Bhosle was among top 20 music icons of the past 50 years.
- In 2011, The Guinness Book of World Records officially acknowledged Asha Bhosle, at The Asian Awards, as the most recorded artist in the history of music. She was awarded a certificate for "the most studio recordings (singles) from Sebastian Coe for recording up to 11,000 solo, duet and chorus-back songs and in over 20 Indian languages since 1943". At the event she was also awarded the Lifetime Achievement Award.
- Asha Bhosle is also the first Indian Singer to be nominated for the Grammy Award.
