= Mangueshi =

- Village
- Location in Goa, India Mangueshi (India)
- Coordinates: 15.446595°N 73.970067°E
- Country: India
- State: Goa
- District: North Goa

Languages
  - Official: Konkani
- Time zone: UTC+5:30 (IST)
- PIN: 403404
- Vehicle registration: GA
- Nearest city: Ponda
- Website: goa.gov.in

Mangueshi is a village located within Ponda taluka in the coastal state of Goa, India. Mangueshi or Mangueshim are other variations for the same name.

Entrance path to Mangeshi Temple

View of Shri Mangeshi Temple Lake.jpg

== History ==
The original site of Mangueshi Temple is Kushasthali or Cortalim in Salcette taluka. To avoid the increasing Portuguese missionary activities in Goa, the GSB community was afraid for the safety of the temples and idols. Hence the families worshipping Shree Shantadurga and Shree Manguesh, on a moonless night, leaving their homes and hearths crossed over the Zuari River to a safer region which was under the rule of the Muslim King Adilshah.

After remaining in the house of a temple priest for sometime, the deity idol was finally installed at its present site in the village.

The territory of Ponda was not under Portuguese rule in the 16th Century and hence was seen as a safe haven by the Hindus fleeing persecution by the Jesuits and Portuguese. The forests of Ponda were ideal places for Hindus to form makeshift temples with the Idols they had salvaged from the broken temples of Sashti (Salcette taluka).

Shri Mangeshi Temple Rath (Temple Chariot).

== Mangeshkar Family ==
The famous musical family of the Mangeshkar's belong to this village of Mangeshi. Their father, Deenanath Mangeshkar was born (1900) in the village of Mangueshi then in Portuguese India to a temple priest and handmaiden of the deity Manguesh. His mother tongue was Konkani. His father was a married Karhade Brahmin pujari and his mother was his Devadasi mistress belonging to Gomantak Maratha Samaj community of Goa.

Deenanath's father had the last name Hardikar;, but Deenanath did not inherit his father's Brahmin caste and surname because his parents were not married to each other. Deenanath adopted the surname Mangeshkar in order to identify his family with his native town - Mangueshi.

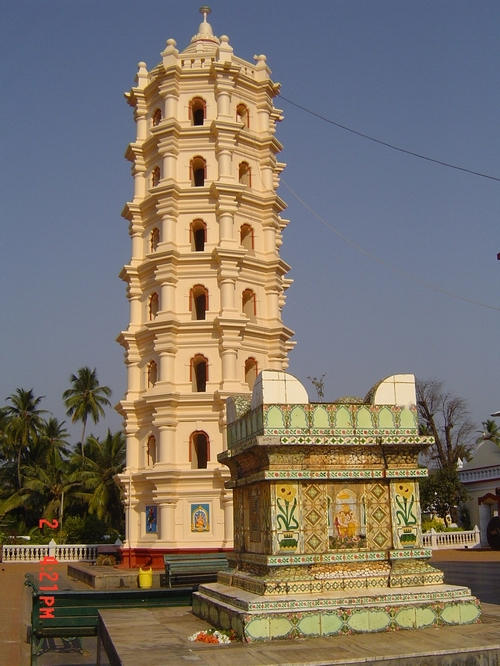
Shri Mangeshi Temple - Majestic 7 storied Deepa Stambha.

== See also ==
- Mangueshi Temple
- Kavale
- Shanta Durga temple
