= Nivdung =

1989 Marathi language film

Nivdung is a 1989 Marathi drama film produced by Hridaynath Mangeshkar. It stars Ravindra Mankani and Archana Joglekar in the lead roles. The other cast includes Sunil Shende, Suhas Bhalekar, and Nayana Apte.

== Plot ==
The movie shows the struggle of a young artist. He comes from a village to the city to try his luck in acting. When he reaches the city he does odd jobs in a theater. He tries very hard to get a role in a play. He also attempts to audition in an acting competition. He is very attracted to the leading lady of the play. She behaves insultingly towards him. Disappointed and dejected, he decides to return to his village and come back to the city only when he has full potential. Meanwhile, in the city, the producer of the theatrical company tries to misbehave with the leading lady; but she escapes from him and joins the young man. The young lady is mesmerized by the beauty of the village and develops a loving bond with young man's mother while gradually falling in love with the young man. The young man, still smarting from her previous behavior, continues to behave rudely with her. All ends well when he receives the news that he has won an award in acting. He becomes free of his past encumbrance of not having enough talent and they both come together.

== Song ==
The songs of the movie were very popular. The music was composed by Hridaynath Mangeshkar. Some songs were sung by him and Asha Bhosale. One of the songs, "Ghar Thakalele", is a poem by the poet Grace and was sung by Hridaynath Mangeshkar. The song "Lav lav kari pat" was sung by Padmaja Phenany Joglekar.

Song	Singer
Ti Geli Tevha	Hridaynath Mangeshkar
Kevha Tari Pahatey	Padmaja Phenani-Joglekar
Ghar Thakleley Sanyasi	Hridaynath Mangeshkar
"Na Manogey To"	Jyotsna Hardikar
"Tu Tevha Tashi"	Hridaynath Mangeshkar
"Luv Luv Kari Patt"	Padmaja Phenani-Joglekar
"Waryani Halatey Raan"	Hridaynath Mangeshkar
