= Lata Mangeshkar Award =

Musical award given by the Government of Madhya Pradesh, Maharashtra & Andhra Pradesh

The Lata Mangeshkar Award is a national-level award instituted to honour works in the field of music. Various state governments of India present awards with this name. The state Government of Madhya Pradesh started this award in 1984. The award consists of a certificate of merit and a cash prize. A Lata Mangeshkar Award has also been given by the Government of Maharashtra since 1992. This is also officially known as "Lata Mangeshkar Award for Lifetime Achievement". Another award is given by the Government of Andhra Pradesh.

After the death of Lata Mangeshkar in 2022, an award named after her was by a charitable trust managed by the Mangeshkar family. The recipients of the various Lata Mangeshkar Awards are as below.

== Master Deenanath Mangeshkar Smriti Pratishthan ==
The Mangeshkar family and the Master Deenanath Mangeshkar Smriti Pratishthan charitable trust decided to institute the award 2022 onwards, to honour the memory of Lata Mangeshkar, who died in February 2022 following multiple organ failure. She was 92.

Awarded by the Master Deenanath Mangeshkar Smriti Pratishthan
| Year | Recipient | Notes |
|---|---|---|
| 2022 | Narendra Modi | Prime Minister |
| 2023 | Asha Bhosle | Singer |
| 2024 | Amitabh Bachchan | Actor |
| 2025 | Kumar Mangalam Birla | Businessman |

== Government of Maharashtra ==
The award presented by the Maharashtra government, the Lata Mangeshkar Award for Lifetime Achievement, consisted of a cash reward of ₹500,000, a citation, a trophy and a shawl.

Issued by Government of Maharashtra
| Year | Recipient | Notes |
|---|---|---|
| 1992 | Manik Varma | Playback Singer |
| 1993 | Shrinivas Khale | Music Director |
| 1994 | Gajanan Watve | Music Director |
| 1995 | Datta Davjekar | Music Director |
| 1996 | Jitendra Abhisheki | Music Director |
| 1997 | Hridaynath Mangeshkar | Music Director |
| 1998 | Jyotsna Bhole | Playback Singer |
| 1999 | Asha Bhosle | Playback Singer |
| 2000 | Anil Biswas | Music Director |
| 2001 | Sudhir Phadke | Music Director |
| 2002 | Ravindra Jain | Music Director |
| 2003 | Pyarelal | Music Director |
| 2004 | Manna Dey | Playback Singer |
| 2005 | Snehal Bhatkar | Music Director |
| 2006 | Jaymala Shiledar | Playback Singer |
| 2007 | Khayyam | Music Director |
| 2008 | Mahendra Kapoor | Playback Singer |
| 2009 | Suman Kalyanpur | Playback Singer |
| 2010 | Sulochana Chavan | Playback Singer |
| 2011 | Yashwant Dev | Music Director |
| 2012 | Anandji | Music Director |
| 2013 | Ashok Patki | Music Director |
| 2014 | Krishna Kalle | Playback Singer |
| 2015 | Prabhakar Jog | Music Director |
| 2016 | Uttam Singh | Music Director |
| 2017 | Pushpa Pagdhare | Playback Singer |
| 2018 | Raamlaxman | Music Director |
| 2019 | Usha Khanna | Music Director |
| 2020 | Usha Mangeshkar | Playback Singer |
| 2021 | Suresh Wadkar | Playback Singer |
| 2022 | Anuradha Paudwal | Playback Singer |
| 2023 | Bhimrao Panchale | Playback Singer |

== Government of Madhya Pradesh ==
Awarded by Government of Madhya Pradesh
| Year | Recipient | Notes |
|---|---|---|
| 1984 | Naushad | Music Director |
| 1985 | Kishore Kumar | Singer |
| 1986 | Jaidev | Music Director |
| 1987 | Manna Dey | Singer |
| 1988 | Khayyam | Music Director |
| 1989 | Asha Bhosle | Singer |
| 1990 | Laxmikant–Pyarelal | Music Directors |
| 1991 | K. J. Yesudas | Singer |
| 1992 | R. D. Burman | Music Director |
| 1993 | Sandhya Mukherjee | Singer |
| 1994 | Anil Biswas | Music Director |
| 1995 | Talat Mahmood | Singer |
| 1996 | Kalyanji–Anandji | Music Directors |
| 1997 | Jagjit Singh | Singer |
| 1998 | Ilaiyaraaja | Music Director |
| 1999 | S. P. Balasubrahmanyam | Singer |
| 2000 | Bhupen Hazarika | Music Director |
| 2001 | Mahendra Kapoor | Singer |
| 2002 | Ravindra Jain | Music Director |
| 2003 | Suresh Wadkar | Singer |
| 2004 | A. R. Rahman | Music Director |
| 2005 | Kavita Krishnamurthy | Singer |
| 2006 | Hridaynath Mangeshkar | Music Director |
| 2007 | O. P. Nayyar | Music Director |
| 2008 | Ravi | Music Director |
| 2009 | Anuradha Paudwal | Singer |
| 2010 | Rajesh Roshan | Music Director |
| 2011 | Hariharan | Singer |
| 2012 | Usha Khanna | Music Director |
| 2013 | Alka Yagnik | Singer |
| 2014 | Bappi Lahiri | Music Director |
| 2015 | Udit Narayan | Singer |
| 2016 | Anu Malik | Music Director |
| 2017 | Suman Kalyanpur | Singer |
| 2018 | Kuldeep Singh | Music Director |
| 2019 | Shailendra Singh | Singer |
| 2020 | Anand–Milind | Music Directors |
| 2021 | Kumar Sanu | Singer |
| 2022 | Uttam Singh | Music Director |
| 2023 | K. S. Chithra | Singer |
| 2024 | Shankar–Ehsaan–Loy | Music Directors |
| 2025 | Sonu Nigam | Singer |
| 2026 | Shantanu Moitra | Music Director |

- O. P. Nayyar was selected for the award in 2007, but refused to accept.

== Government of Andhra Pradesh ==
Issued by Government of Andhra Pradesh
| Year | Recipient | Notes |
|---|---|---|
| 2011 | Shankar Mahadevan | Music Director |
| 2011 | K. S. Chithra | Singer |
