= Saagara Pran Talamalala =

Marathi patriotic song

Ne majasi ne parat maatrubhumilaa, Saagara Pran Talamalala is a Marathi patriotic song based on a poem written by Vinayak Damodar Savarkar. Lyrics:

== Performance ==
The original music was composed by Pandit Hridaynath Mangeshkar (पं. हृदयनाथ मंगेशकर). It has been recorded by him and Lata, Usha and Meena Mangeshkar.
