= Deenanath Mangeshkar =

Indian actor and musician (1900–1942)

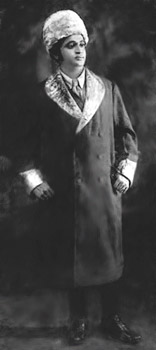

Background information
- Also known as: Pandit Deenanath Mangeshkar; Master Deenanath Mangeshkar; Dinanath Mangeshkar; Dina
- Born: 29 December 1900; Mangueshi, Goa, Portuguese India
- Died: 24 April 1942 (aged 41) Poona, Bombay Presidency, British India
- Genres: Indian classical, Indian semi-classical, Natya Sangeet
- Occupations: Vocalist, Singer, Marathi film producer
- Instrument: Vocals

Deenanath Mangeshkar (Marathi pronunciation: [d̪iːnanaːt̪ʰ məŋɡeːʃkəɾ]; 29 December 1900 – 24 April 1942) was an Indian actor, Natya Sangeet musician and Hindustani classical vocalist who was active in Marathi theatre. He is the father of well-known singers Lata Mangeshkar, Asha Bhosle, Meena Khadikar and Usha Mangeshkar as well as composer Hridaynath Mangeshkar.

== Background ==
Deenanath Mangeshkar was born in Mangueshi, Goa on 29 December 1900. His father, Ganesh Bhatt Navathe, called Bhikoba or Bhikambhatt, was a Karhade Brahmin who served as priest at the famous Mangeshi Temple in Goa. The family had two more surnames associated with it - Hardikar and Abhisheki. Dinanath's mother Yesubai Rane was his father's mistress belonging to the Devadasi community of Goa, which is now known as Gomantak Maratha Samaj. In his teens, he adopted the surname "Mangeshkar," which means "of Mangesh." Mangesh is also the name of the deity worshipped in the Mangeshi Temple.

As a Devadasi, Yesubai was a reputed musician. Deenanath's father's surname was Hardikar, whose family performed the Abhishekam (ritual bathing) of the lingam of Shiva at Mangueshi Temple, thus they were known as Abhishekis. Deenanath's paternal half-brother, Balwant Nawathe, was the father of the Indian vocalist Jitendra Abhisheki.

== Career ==
Deenanath Mangeshkar started taking singing and Indian classical music lessons from Shri Baba Mashelkar at the age of five. He was also to become a disciple at the Gwalior gharana. He was fascinated by the variety and aggressive style of Ramkrishnabuwa Vaze and became Vaze's gandabandh shagird (formally initiated disciple in Indian classical music). In his youth, he also travelled to Bikaner and took formal training in classical music from Pundit Sukhdev Prasad, father of Pundit Mani Prasad, of the Kirana Gharana. He joined the Kirloskar Sangeet Mandali and the Kirloskar Natak Mandali at the age of 11. Later, he left Kirloskar Mandali, and formed Balwant Mandali with his friends Chintaman Ganesh Kolhatkar and Krishnarao Kolhapure. This new group had Ram Ganesh Gadkari's blessing, but Gadkari died in January 1919 shortly after the group was formed.

Deenanath's good looks and melodious voice won him popularity in the Marathi theatre. So much so that the then giant of the Marathi stage, Bal Gandharva publicly declared that he would welcome the entry of Deenanath in his organisation "by throwing a carpet of rupee coins under his feet". He produced 3 films in 1935, one of them being Krishnarjun Yuddha. It was made in both Hindi and Marathi, and a song in the film was sung by and filmed on Deenanath.

Mangeshkar had also studied Indian astrology. Partly out of his interest in astrology and numerology, he believed that dramas with 5 letters, with anuswar (diacritical) on the third letter, were lucky for him. Examples : Ranadundubhi (रणदुंदुभी), Rajsanyas (राजसंन्यास), Deshkantak (देशकंटक). The dramas produced by Deenanath were extremely popular amongst the masses due to his masterly presentation of the songs composed by Vaze and their patriotic content.

== Personal life ==
=== First marriage ===
Deenanath's first wife was Narmada (later renamed "Shrimati" by her husband). She was the daughter of Gujarati Seth Haridas Ramdas Lad – a prosperous businessman of the town of Thalner (in the district Dhule (Khandesh), Maharashtra). Deenanath and Narmada were married in 1922. She was 19 at the time of their marriage and Deenanath was 21. They had a daughter named Latika, who died in her infancy. Deenanath's wife also died shortly thereafter.

=== Second marriage ===
Deenanath then married his first wife's sister, Shevanti. Some sources claim that Deenanath renamed his second wife "Shrimati" as well, however it is widely agreed that in reality, he renamed her "Sudhamati". Their wedding was solemnised at Dhule was a quiet ceremony within the house in 1927. Shevanti's mother chose not to attend. The couple had five children: Lata, Meena, Asha, Usha, and Hridaynath.

Their first child was named Hema. But Deenanath called her Lata in memory of his deceased infant daughter. The name stuck and it was by that name that his legendary eldest daughter, Lata Mangeshkar, was widely known.

== Death ==
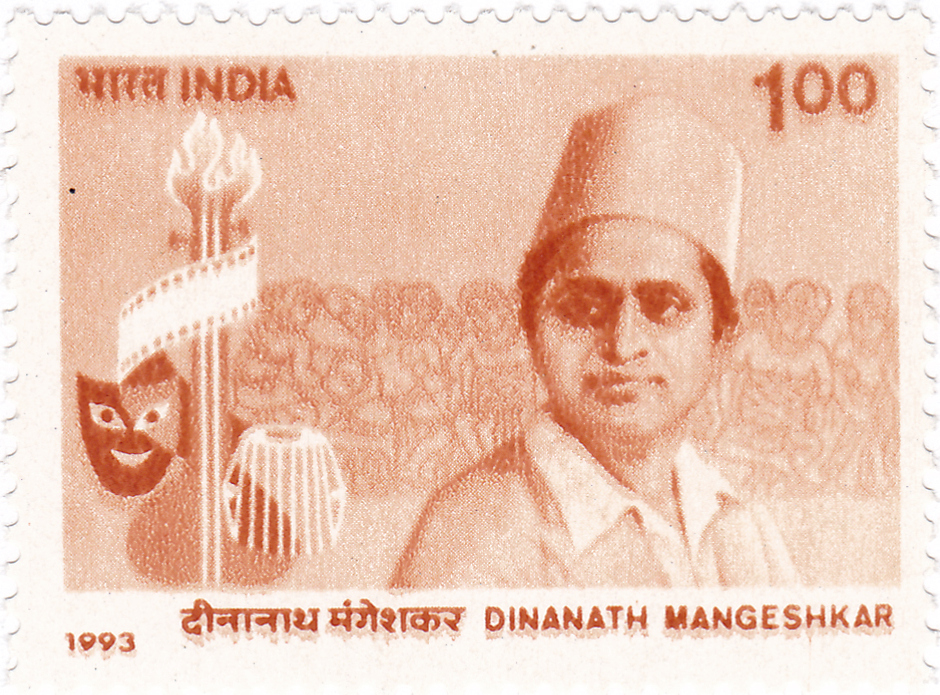
Mangeshkar on a 1993 stamp of India

Deenanath took to alcohol during the days of financial hardship in 1930s. After being ill for a few weeks, he died in Pune in April 1942. He was only 41 at the time of his death.

His family has erected a Deenanath Mangeshkar Hospital and research centre in his name in Pune.

== Theatrical productions ==
Some of his theatrical productions, in which he sang and starred too, are

- Manapaman (मानापमान) (written by K.P. Khadilkar)
- Ranadundubhi (रणदुंदुभी) (written by Veer Vamanrao Joshi) Music composed by Vaze buwa
- Punyaprabhaav (पुण्यप्रभाव)(written by Ram Ganesh Gadkari)
- Sanyasta Khadga (संन्यस्तखड्ग) (written by Vinayak Damodar Savarkar) Music composed by Vaze buwa
- Rajsanyaas (राजसंन्यास) (written by Ram Ganesh Gadkari)
- Deshkantak (देशकंटक)
- Ram Rajya Viyog (रामराज्य वियोग)

== See also ==
- Mangeshkar Family
