= You're the One for Me =

You're the One for Me can refer to:

- "You're the One for Me", a 1981 single by D. Train
- "You're the One for Me", a 2007 single by Brett Lee featuring Asha Bosle
- "You're the One for Me", a song by Status Quo from the album In Search of the Fourth Chord (2007)
- "You're the One for Me, Fatty", a 1992 single by Morrissey
