= Asha Bhosle =

Indian singer (1933–2026)

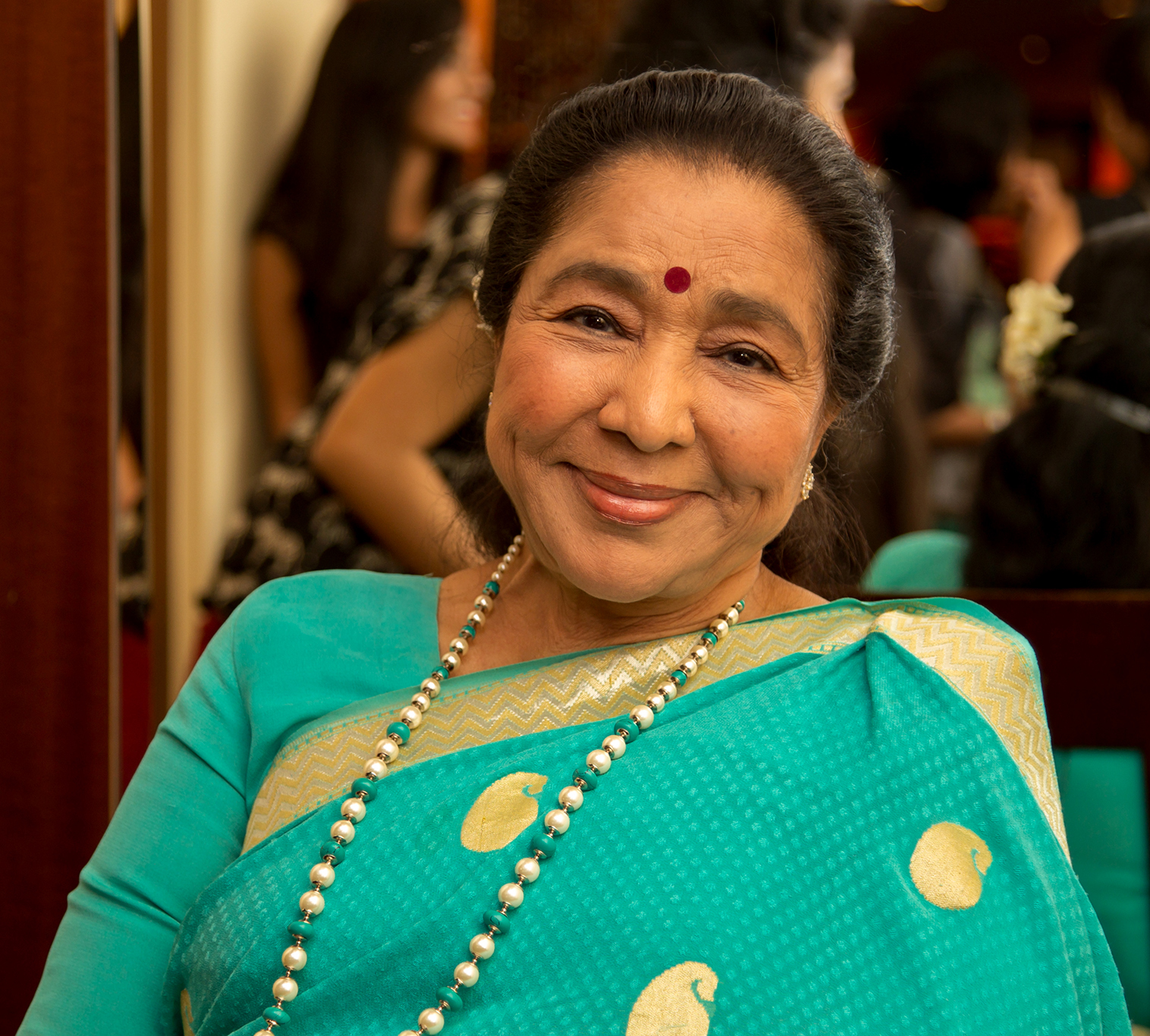
- Bhosle in 2015
- Born: Asha Mangeshkar; 8 September 1933; Goar, Sangli State, British India (present-day Maharashtra, India)
- Died: 12 April 2026 (aged 92); Mumbai, Maharashtra, India
- Occupations: Playback singer; actress
- Years active: 1943–2026
- Works: Full list
- Spouse(s): Ganpatrao Bhosle (m. 1949; died 1966) R. D. Burman (m. 1980; died 1994)
- Children: 3 (including Varsha Bhosle)
- Father: Deenanath Mangeshkar
- Relatives: See list
- Family: Mangeshkar family and Manikya dynasty (in-laws)
- Awards: Full list
- Honours: Dadasaheb Phalke Award (2000); Padma Vibhushan (2008); Banga Bibhushan (2018); Maharashtra Bhushan (2021)
- Musical career
- Genres: Filmi; Qawwali; ghazals; folk; bhajans; pop; classical; Gurbani; Nazrul Geeti; Rabindra Sangeet
- Instrument: Vocals

Asha Bhosle (Note: Bhosle's name has been credited variously as Asha, Asha Bhosle, Asha Bhonsale, Asha Bhonsle, Asha Bhonsley, Asha Bhosale and Asha Bhosley. She is often referred to as Ashaji – the Hindi suffix ji denotes respect.) (née Mangeshkar; 8 September 1933 – 12 April 2026) was an Indian playback singer and actress who predominantly worked in Indian cinema. Known for her versatility, she was described in the media as one of the greatest and most influential singers in Hindi cinema. In a career spanning over eight decades, she recorded songs for films and albums in various Indian languages and won several accolades including two National Film Awards, four BFJA Awards, eighteen Maharashtra State Film Awards, nine Filmfare Awards including a Lifetime Achievement Award and a record seven Filmfare Awards for Best Female Playback Singer, (Note: Tied with Alka Yagnik.) in addition to two Grammy nominations. In 2000, she was honoured with the Dadasaheb Phalke Award, India's highest award in the field of cinema. In 2008, she was honoured by the Government of India with the Padma Vibhushan, the second-highest civilian honour of the country. The Guinness Book of World Records acknowledged her in 2011 as the most recorded artist in music history.

Bhosle was the younger sister of playback singer Lata Mangeshkar and belonged to the prominent Mangeshkar family. Renowned for her soprano voice range and often credited with her versatility, her work included film music, pop, ghazals, bhajans, traditional Indian classical music, folk songs, qawwalis, and Rabindra Sangeet. Apart from Hindi, she sang in over 20 Indian and foreign languages. In 2013, she made her debut as an actress in the film Mai, and received critical acclaim for her performance. In 2006, she stated that she had recorded over 12,000 songs in her career, a figure repeated by several other sources.

== Early life ==
Asha Mangeshkar was born in the small hamlet of Goar in Sangli, then in the salute princely state of Sangli (now in Maharashtra), into the musical family of Pandit Deenanath Mangeshkar, who was Marathi and Konkani, and his Gujarati wife, Shevanti. Deenanath was an actor and classical singer on the Marathi musical stage. When Bhosle was nine years old, her father died. The family moved from Pune to Kolhapur and then to Mumbai. She and her elder sister Lata Mangeshkar began singing and acting in films to support their family. She sang her first film song, '"Chala Chala Nav Bala", for the Marathi film Majha Bal (1943). The music for the film was composed by Datta Davjekar. She made her Hindi film debut when she sang the song "Saawan Aaya" for Hansraj Behl's Chunariya (1948), though another film, Andhon Ki Duniya, was released before Chunariya in the same year; in both films she sang three songs each. Her first solo Hindi film song was for the movie Raat Ki Rani (1949). She made her Assamese film debut song when she sang the song "Pokhiraj Ghora" for the movie Sikimik Bijuli along with Kishore Kumar and Dr. Bhupen Hazarika in 1969.

Bhosle described herself as "an accident singer" who had learned by keenly listening to her father Deenanath Mangeshkar, his disciples, and her elder sister Lata Mangeshkar sing. She maintained daily riyaaz (practice) regardless of her age, stating that music was "equivalent to breathing" for her. Bhosle cited Elvis Presley and Bill Haley to have influenced her to embrace the western music style.

Her sisters, Lata and Usha Mangeshkar, have been playback singers. Her elder sister Meena Mangeshkar and younger brother Hridaynath Mangeshkar are music directors.

== Career ==
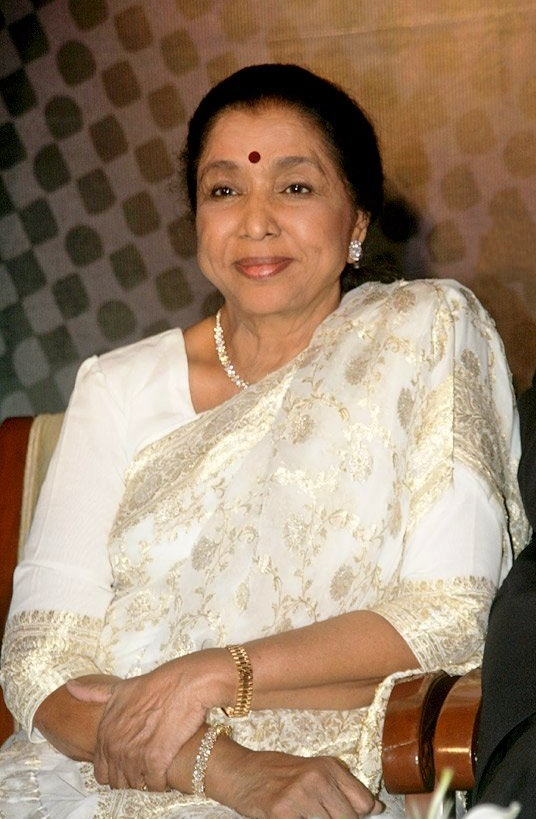
Asha Bhosle in 2008

From the late 1940s to early 1950s, prominent playback singers like Geeta Dutt, Shamshad Begum and Lata Mangeshkar dominated singing for female leads and big films. In the 1950s, Bhosle sang more songs than most playback singers in Hindi films. Most of these were in low budget films. Her earliest songs included compositions by A. R. Qureshi, Sajjad Hussain, S. Mohinder, Sardar Malik and Ghulam Mohammed. Singing in Sangdil (1952), composed by Sajjad Hussain, she got reasonable recognition. In the same year, she had the lead in the film Chham Chhama Chham, under O. P. Nayyar, she sang 10 out of 11 songs in that film. Consequently, film director Bimal Roy gave her a chance to sing in Parineeta (1953). Raj Kapoor signed her to sing all songs in Boot Polish (1954), which gained her popularity.

O. P. Nayyar gave Bhosle a number of songs from 1952 to 1956, and she achieved success with B. R. Chopra's soundtrack of Naya Daur (1957). Her duets with Rafi like "Maang Ke Saath Tumhara", "Saathi Haath Badhana" and "Uden Jab Jab Zulfein Teri", penned by Sahir Ludhianvi, earned her recognition. It was the first time she sang all the songs for a film's leading actress. B. R. Chopra then approached her for several of his later productions, including Dhool Ka Phool, Gumrah (1963), Waqt (1965), Hamraaz (1967), Aadmi Aur Insaan (1969), Dhund (1973) and many more. O. P. Nayyar's future collaboration with Bhosle also resulted in success. Gradually, she established her status and received the patronage of such composers as Sachin Dev Burman and Ravi. Bhosle and O. P. Nayyar had a professional and personal parting of ways in the 1970s. In 1966, Bhosle's performances in the duets from one of music director R.D. Burman's soundtracks, for the movie Teesri Manzil, won popular acclaim. Reportedly, when she first heard the dance number "Aaja Aaja", she felt she would not be able to sing this westernised tune. While Burman offered to change the music, she refused, taking it as a challenge. She completed the song after ten days of rehearsals, and "Aaja Aaja", along with such other songs as "O Haseena Zulfonwali" and "O Mere Sona Re" (all three duets with Rafi), became successful. Shammi Kapoor, the film's leading actor, was once quoted as saying, "If I did not have Mohammad Rafi to sing for me, I would have got Asha Bhosle to do the job". Bhosle's collaboration with Burman resulted in numerous hits and a marriage. During the 1960s and 1970s, she was the voice of Hindi film actress and dancer Helen, on whom "O Haseena Zulfon Wali" was picturised. It is said that Helen would attend her recording sessions so that she could understand the song better and plan dance steps accordingly. Some of their other popular numbers include "Piya Tu Ab To Aaja" (Caravan) and "Yeh Mera Dil" (Don), among others.

In 1981, Bhosle attempted a different genre by singing several ghazals for the Rekha-starrer Umrao Jaan, including "Dil Cheez Kya Hai", "In Aankhon Ki Masti Ke", "Yeh Kya Jagah Hai Doston" and "Justju Jiski Thi". The film's music director, Khayyam, had lowered her pitch by half a note. Bhosle herself expressed surprise that she could sing so differently. The ghazals won her the first National Film Award of her career. A few years later, she won another National Award for the song "Mera Kuchh Saamaan" from Ijaazat (1987).

In 1995, 62-year-old Bhosle sang for actress Urmila Matondkar in the movie Rangeela. The soundtrack featured songs like "Tanha Tanha" and "Rangeela Re" sung by her, and composed by music director A. R. Rahman, who would go on to record several songs with her. During the 2000s, several of Bhosle's numbers became chartbusters, including "Radha Kaise Na Jale" from Lagaan (2001), "Kambakht Ishq" from Pyaar Tune Kya Kiya (2001), "Yeh Lamha" from Filhaal (2002) and "Lucky Lips" from Lucky (2005). In October 2004, The Very Best of Asha Bhosle, The Queen of Bollywood, a compilation album of songs recorded by Bhosle for albums and Hindi language films that were released between 1966 and 2003, was released. and did for 1995 Pakistani film Sangram .

In 2012 she judged Sur Kshetra.

In 2013, Bhosle debuted in the film Mai in the title role, at the age of 79. Bhosle played the role of a 65-year-old mother who suffers from Alzheimer's disease and is abandoned by her children. She received positive reviews for her acting as well from critics.

In May 2020, Bhosle launched her YouTube channel, "Asha Bhosle Official".

In an interview with The Indian Express in 2023, Bhosle stated: "The most difficult part of my musical journey was to consciously create my own identity. Today, I am pleased that my form of music is known as the Asha Bhosle style." In the same 2023 interview, Bhosle said her connection with music had grown stronger with age: "I no longer just sing a tune, I feel the notes surging through my veins. It's almost like I see the music."

== Partnership with music directors ==
=== O. P. Nayyar ===
Music director O. P. Nayyar was the composer who transformed Bhosle's status from vampish roles to that of the heroine.

Nayyar first met Bhosle in 1952, at the music recording of Chham Chhama Chham. He then called her for a film called Mangu (1954), and gave her a big break in superhit films like Baap Re Baap (1955), Ham Sab Chor Hain (1956), C.I.D. (1956), Duniya Rang Rangeeli (1957), Mr. Qartoon M. A. (1958) and many more. However, it was the success of Naya Daur (1957) that made the duo popular. After 1959, she was emotionally and professionally involved with O. P. Nayyar.

The team of O. P. Nayyar and Bhosle is best remembered for their breezy and sometimes sirenish songs. Some good examples of their sensuous numbers are "Aaiye Meharbaan" picturised on Madhubala (Howrah Bridge, 1958) and "Yeh Hai Reshmi Zulfon Ka Andhera", (Mere Sanam, 1965). "Aao Huzoor Tumko" (Kismat, 1968) and "Jaiye Aap Kahan Jayenge" (Mere Sanam, 1965) were also popular. They also recorded songs for many hit movies like Tumsa Nahin Dekha (1957), Ek Musafir Ek Hasina (1962) and Kashmir Ki Kali (1964). O. P. Nayyar used the Bhosle-Rafi duo for his most popular duets such as "Mangke Saath Tumhara", "Uden Jab Jab Zulfein Teri" (both from Naya Daur), "Aap Yun Hi Agar Humse Milte Rahe", "Main Pyaar Ka Rahi Hoon" (both from Ek Musafir Ek Hasina), "Deewana Hua Baadal", "Ishaaron Ishaaron Mein" (both from Kashmir Ki Kali).

Bhosle recorded her last song for O. P. Nayyar in the movie Pran Jaye Par Vachan Na Jaye (1974). The solo number "Chain Se Humko Kabhi" garnered many awards, but it was not included in the movie.

They separated on 5 August 1972. It is not clear what made them part their ways. On being asked the reason for their parting, O. P. Nayyar once said, "I know astrology very well. I knew that one day I had to part with her. Something also happened that upset me, so I left her." Nevertheless, he also said "...now that I am seventy-six, I can say that the most important person in my life was Asha Bhosle. She was the best person I ever met."

The parting of Bhosle and O. P. Nayyar was bitter, and probably therefore she hesitated to give Nayyar his due. While talking about O. P. Nayyar in an interview with The Times of India, she once remarked, "Whichever composer gave me work, it was because my voice was suited to his music at that point. No one musician did me any favor by asking me to sing for him." She gives the credit for her first big break to B. R. Chopra, the producer of Naya Daur.

=== Khayyam ===
Another music director who recognized Bhosle's talent early was Khayyam. Their partnership dates back to his first movie Biwi (1948), in which Khayyam was assistant music director. Khayyam gave her some good assignments in the 1950s, including Footpath and Phir Subah Hogi. However, their collaboration is chiefly remembered for the songs of Umrao Jaan.

=== Ravi ===
Music composer Ravi considered Bhosle one of his favorite singers. She sang for his first movie Vachan (1955). The melodious lullaby from this movie, "Chanda Mama Door Ke" became an overnight hit among young mothers in India. Ravi got her to sing bhajans for the movies Gharana, Grahasti, Kaajal and Phool Aur Patthar, Ravi and Bhosle recorded a variety of songs, including the popular comic duet with Kishore Kumar :– "C A T...Cat, Cat Maane Billi" (Dilli Ka Thug). The bhajan "Tora Man Darpan Kehlaye" (Kaajal) attained great popularity.

They also recorded songs for many popular movies like Waqt, Chaudhvin Ka Chand, Gumrah, Bahu Beti, China Town, Aadmi Aur Insaan, Dhund, Hamraaz and many more. For Chaudhvin Ka Chand, Ravi wanted Geeta Dutt (the wife of actor and producer Guru Dutt) to sing the songs. Guru Dutt insisted that only Bhosle could do justice with those songs, which has been proved.

=== Sachin Dev Burman ===
Sachin Dev Burman was one composer who recognized the potential and versatility in Bhosle. He used Bhosle's voice, as well as her sister Lata Mangeshkar's. He had some misunderstandings with Lata from 1957 to 1962, and in that time Bhosle was his only female voice. She and Burman Dada gave many songs in movies such as Nau Do Gyarah, Kala Pani, Kala Bazar, Insan Jaag Utha, Lajwanti, Sujata, Teen Devian and many more. They recorded many songs together after 1962 as well.

=== Rahul Dev Burman (Pancham) ===
Bhosle first met Rahul Dev Burman (also known as Pancham) when she was the mother of two and he was in 10th grade having dropped out to pursue music. Their partnership was first noticed in Teesri Manzil (1966). She went on to record a variety of songs with him – cabarets, rock, disco, ghazals and classical.

In the 1970s, Bhosle and Burman's youthful Western songs took Hindi film music by storm – the raunchy cabaret "Piya Tu Ab To Aaja" (Caravan, picturized on Helen), the rebellious "Dum Maro Dum" (Hare Rama Hare Krishna, 1971), the sexy "Duniya Mein Logon Ko" (Apna Desh, 1972) and the romantic "Chura Liya Hai Tumne" (Yaadon Ki Baaraat, 1973). Burman also recorded many hit duets with Bhosle and Kishore Kumar such as "Jaan-E-Jaan Dhundhta Phir Raha" (Jawani Diwani) and "Bhali Bhali Si Ek Soorat" (Buddha Mil Gaya).

In the 1980s, Burman and Bhosle recorded subtle numbers for films like Ijaazat (1987) - "Mera Kuch Saaman", "Khaali Haath Shaam Aayi Hai" and "Katra Katra". They also recorded the duet "O Maria!" (Saagar).

Bhosle used to call R. D. Burman "Bob". She married him in 1980. Their partnership lasted until his death.

R. D. Burman made her sing some of the most legendary songs in Bengali as well, namely "Mohuaye Jomechhe Aaj Mou Go", "Chokhe Chokhe Kotha Bolo", "Chokhe Naame Brishti" (Bengali version of "Jaane Kya Baat Hai"), "Baanshi Sune Ki Ghore Thaka Jaye", "Sondhya Belay Tumi Aami" and "Aaj Gun Gun Gun Kunje Amar" (Bengali version of "Pyaar Deewana Hota Hai") and many other songs.

=== Bappi Lahiri ===
Bhosle had a long collaboration with Bappi Lahiri, from the mid 70s to the mid 90s. Bhosle gave many songs under Bappi Lahiri, among which were Haathkadi (1982), Namak Halaal (1982), Sharaabi (1984), Himmatwala (1983), Mawaali (1983), Tohfa (1984) and Prem Pratigyaa (1989). The last duet of Kishore-Bhosle, "Guru Guru, Aa Jao Guru" from Waqt Ki Awaz (1988), also had music by Bappi Lahiri. Bappi Lahiri also composed the memorable ghazal "Kisi Nazar Ko Tera Intazaar Aaj Bhi Hai" for Aitbaar (1985), also sung by Bhosle.

=== Ilaiyaraaja ===
Prolific Indian film composer Ilaiyaraaja began employing Bhosle's vocals in the early 1980s, their earliest collaboration being for the film Moondram Pirai (1982) (remade in Hindi as Sadma in 1983). Their association continued, mostly through the latter half of the 1980s and early 1990s. Another notable song from this period is "Shenbagamae" for the movie Enga Ooru Pattukaran in 1987. In 2000, Bhosle sang the theme song for Kamal Haasan's political film Hey Ram. The song, "Nee Partha Parvai" in Tamil and Janmon Ki Jwala in Hindi (or Aparna's Theme), was a duet with singer Hariharan.

=== A. R. Rahman ===
A. R. Rahman worked with Bhosle's on Rangeela (1995). She and Rahman went on to record more songs like "Mujhe Rang De" (Thakshak), "Radha Kaise Na Jale" (Lagaan, duet with Udit Narayan), "Kahin Aag Lage" (Taal), "O Bhanware" (Daud, duet with K. J. Yesudas), "Venilla Venilla" (Iruvar, 1999), "September Madham" (Alaipayuthey, 2000) and "Dhuan Dhuan" (Meenaxi, 2004).

=== Jaidev ===
When S D Burman's assistant Jaidev started giving music independently, he got Bhosle to sing some of his songs as well. They worked in Hum Dono (1961), Mujhe Jeene Do (1963), Do Boond Pani (1971) and other movies. In 1971, the pair released an LP of eight non-film devotional songs and ghazals called An Unforgettable Treat. Bhosle considered Jaidev a close friend who stood by her when she was struggling personally and professionally. Upon his death in 1987, she released a compilation album of lesser-known songs he had composed for her, called Suranjali.

=== Shankar–Jaikishan ===
Shankar–Jaikishan worked with Bhosle in a number of songs, especially, from 1965 to 1972. Some hits of this trio including the seductive "Parde Mein Rehne Do" (Shikar, 1968). Bhosle got her second Filmfare Award for the song. She also sang "Zindagi Ek Safar Hai Suhana" (Andaz, 1971) for Shankar–Jaikishan, in which she tried to yodel like Kishore Kumar, whose version of the song is more popular. They also used her voice in films like Boot Polish (1954), Shree 420 (1955), Chori Chori (1956), Jis Desh Men Ganga Behti Hai (1960), Junglee (1961), An Evening in Paris (1967) and Kal Aaj Aur Kal (1971), Lal Patthar (1971), Aankhon Aankhon Mein (1972) among others. Bhosle gave all female vocals for the songs of Mera Naam Joker (1970) also.

=== Anu Malik ===
Composer Anu Malik and Bhosle have recorded many singles together starting from Poonam (1981), including songs for the hit films like Sohni Mahiwal (1984). Their most popular songs include "Yeh Lamha Filhaal Jee Lene De" (Filhaal) and "Kitabein Bahut Si" (Baazigar) among others. The voice of Bhosle in Anu Malik's "Jab Dil Mile" (Yaadein) stood out among voices of Udit Narayan, Sukhwinder Singh and Sunidhi Chauhan. Their last collaboration was on the song "Prem Mein Tohre" (Begum Jaan), which also received praise.

=== Other composers ===
Madan Mohan recorded a number of songs with Bhosle, including the popular folk number "Jhumka Gira Re" picturised on Sadhana from Mera Saaya (1966), some other films of Madan Mohan with Bhosle are Aakhri Dao (1958), Adalat (1958), Pooja Ke Phool (1964), Neela Aakash (1965), Neend Hamari Khwab Tumhare (1966) to name a very few. In Chhoti Si Baat (1976), Bhosle sang the "Jaaneman Jaaneman" number with K. J. Yesudas for Salil Chowdhury. Salil's 1956 movie Jagte Raho also had a number recorded by Bhosle, "Thandi Thandi Saawan Ki Phuhaar", Bhosle also had the lead for Salil Chowdhury in Amanat (1955). Bhosle sang many hit songs under C. Ramchandra in films like Insaniyat (1955), Raj Tilak (1958), Paigham (1959), Navrang (1959), Amar Deep (1958), Sharada (1957), Aasha (1957) among others, the superhit song "Eena Meena Deeka" (from Aasha, sung by Kishore and Bhosle in two different versions) was composed by C. Ramchandra.

Another Bhosle patron is the young composer Sandeep Chowta, who got her to sing "Kambakht Ishq", a trio with Sonu Nigam and Sukhwinder Singh for the movie Pyaar Tune Kya Kiya (2001). The song gained major popularity among the Indian youth. Vidyasagar recorded Bhosle's voice for a popular duet song "Konja Neram" for the Rajinikanth starrer Chandramukhi (2005) along with Madhu Balakrishnan.

Bhosle worked with Lata-patrons like Laxmikant–Pyarelal, Naushad Ali, Ravindra Jain, N. Dutta and Hemant Kumar. When Naushad was asked to sum up the essential difference between Lata and Bhosle, he said that Bhosle "lacks certain something which Lata, and Lata alone has." Later he stated in an interview, "Maybe I said it because I then had a closed ear on Asha". Naushad, later in his life, also admitted that he had been unfair to Bhosle. Bhosle also worked with other noted Hindi film composers like Roshan, Chitragupt, Kalyanji-Anandji, Usha Khanna, Nadeem-Shravan, Jatin-Lalit and others.

== Non-film music ==
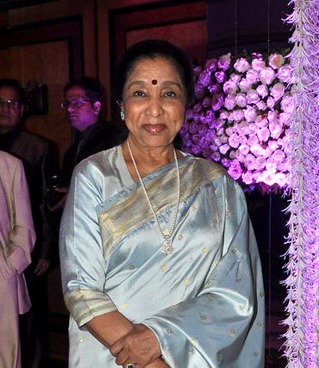
Asha Bhosle at Sunidhi Chauhan's wedding reception

=== Studio albums ===
In a rare feat, noted lyricist Gulzar, music director R.D. Burman and Bhosle came together in 1987 to create a double album titled Dil Padosi Hai, which was released on 8 September 1987. In 1995, Bhosle underwent the gatha bandan (thread-tying) ceremony with Hindustani classical music maestro Ali Akbar Khan to learn a classical repertoire held within the Maihar gharana (stylistic school of Indian classical music), as handed down to Khan by his father Allauddin Khan (the guru of Ravi Shankar). Later, Bhosle and Ustad Ali Akbar Khan recorded eleven fixed compositions (or bandishes) in California for Legacy, a private album that earned them a Grammy Award nomination for Best Global Music Album at the 39th Annual Grammy Awards.

In the 1990s, Bhosle experimented with remixed R.D. Burman songs. She was criticized by many, including Khayyam, for tampering with old melodies. Nevertheless, albums like Rahul And I became quite popular. In 1997, Bhosle did a private Indipop album Janam Samjha Karo with Lesle Lewis. The album was hugely popular and won her many awards including the 1997 MTV Award.

Bhosle was once asked by director B. R. Ishara to compose music for one of his films, but she politely declined. In 2002, she turned music composer with the album Aap Ki Asha, an eight-song music and video album. The lyrics were written by Majrooh Sultanpuri. The album was released by Sachin Tendulkar on 21 May 2001 at a lavish party in Mumbai. The album received mixed reviews.

Bhosle had spotted Pakistani singer Adnan Sami's talent when he was about 10 years old. At that time, she was performing in London with R. D. Burman. It was she who had asked him to pursue his interests in music. When Adnan grew up and became a professional musician, Bhosle sang the title duet with him for his best-selling album Kabhi To Nazar Milao. The two came together again in the album Barse Badal. The album comprises eight songs, based on Indian Classical music. She contributed the song Yun Na Thi to the recording Womad Talking Book Volume Four: An Introduction to Asia 1 on Womad Records.

Bhosle sang ghazals for many albums like Meraj-E-Ghazal, Aabshar-e-Ghazal and Kashish. In 2005, Bhosle released a self-titled album as a tribute to the four ghazal maestros – Mehdi Hassan, Ghulam Ali, Farida Khanum and Jagjit Singh. The album features eight of her favorite ghazals like Farida Khanum's Aaj Jaane Ki Zid Na Karo, Ghulam Ali's Chupke Chupke, Aawargi and Dil Mein Ek Lahar, Jagjit Singh's Ahista Ahista and Mehdi Hassan's Ranjish Hi Sahi, Rafta Rafta and Mujhe Tum Nazar Se. These classic ghazals were recreated with modern sounds by musician Pandit Somesh Mathur. The album was aimed at the younger generation, who, according to Bhosle, are "turned off" by the traditional sounds of tabla and sarangi.

Numerous compilations of Bhosle's songs have been released as well. To commemorate her 60th birthday, EMI India released three cassettes: Bala Main Bairagan Hoongi (devotional songs), The Golden Collection: Memorable Ghazals (non-film ghazals by composers such as Ghulam Ali, R.D. Burman and Nazar Hussain), and The Golden Collection: The Ever Versatile Asha Bhosle (44 popular film songs).

In 1996, Bhosle sang Channeache Rati among several other songs in Rajendra Talak's Konkani album Daryachya Deger with Suresh Wadkar.

In 2006, she recorded an album Asha and Friends, singing duets, with film actors Sanjay Dutt and Urmila Matondkar and famous cricket player Brett Lee, with whom she sang, "You're the One for Me" ("Haan Main Tumhara Hoon"). All these songs composed by Shamir Tandon were shot on video by journalist turned director S. Ramachandran.

In 2009, she sang a song for Sri Lankan artistes Bathiya and Santhush titled "Dedunna Sedi".

In 2014, she sang a song titled "Dil Lagane Ko Dil Jab" for the International Women's Day special album, Women's Day Special: Spreading Melodies Everywhere. It was composed by Shamir Tandon and penned by Saajan Agarwal. That same year, she sang one more song titled "Bappa Morya" with her granddaughter Zanai Bhosle on Ganesh chaturthi for Saregama Music company composed by Nitin Shankar song written by Sahil Sultanpuri.

In 2015, Bhosle recorded a Sufi song, "Fariyad Sun Fakira" with co-singers Javed Ali and Pankaj Kumar.

In 2016, she recorded the album 82 with music director Mandar Agashe who decorated six of Suresh Bhat's ghazals with his musical touch of pop, reggae, blues, and rock. The album was named after her age at the time of recording. About the album 82, Bhosle said, "I had a long association with Suresh Bhat and have a lot of memories about him. With this album, I will relive those memories. I don't need to tell you how powerful his words were and, with the album, that power can be experienced again. Mr. Bhat always wanted to record these ghazals in the pop and rock genres and it is good to see Mandar fulfilling that wish. I just wish Mr. Bhat was among us today."

In 2020, during the COVID-19 pandemic and the lockdown throughout the nation, Bhosle along with many noted artists like S. P. Balasubrahmanyam, Udit Narayan, Kailash Kher, Usha Uthup, Shaan, Alka Yagnik, Sonu Nigam and other 200 artists of India, worked on a song named "Jayatu Jayatu Bharatam" to unite the country during the pandemic.

=== Concerts and collaborations with foreign artists ===
In the 1980s and 1990s, Bhosle staged concerts in Canada, Dubai, UK, US and many other countries. In October 2002, she did a concert with Sudesh Bhosle and others in London, for "Help the Aged", to help raise funds for the elderly in India. In 2007 she toured the US, Canada, and West Indies in a tour called "The Incredibles". In this tour, she was accompanied by singers Sonu Nigam, Kunal Ganjawala and Kailash Kher. This tour, originally scheduled for only 12 concerts, went on to run more than 20.

In the early 1990s, Bhosle sang with Boy George ("Bow Down Mister"). In 1997, she sang a love song with the boy band Code Red, at the age of 64. She also recorded the song "The Way you Dream" (One Giant Leap), with Michael Stipe that was used in the English movie, Bulletproof Monk. The song was also included on the 2002 album 1 Giant Leap.

In 1997, the British band Cornershop paid tribute to Bhosle with their song "Brimful of Asha," an international hit which was later remixed by Fatboy Slim. In 2001, the CD single of Nelly Furtado's "I'm Like a Bird" included a "Nellie vs. Asha Remix" created by Digital Cutup Lounge.

In 2003, British opera pop singer Sarah Brightman sampled her song "Dil Cheez Kya Hai" on her album Harem. It was used as the intro for her song "You Take My Breath Away".

In 2005, American string quartet Kronos Quartet re-recorded R D Burman compositions like "Chura Liya", "Piya Tu" and "Mera Kuchh Saaman" among others and got Bhosle to sing them. Despite her age, she recorded three to four songs a day, leaving the quartet members stupefied. On 23 August 2005, You've Stolen My Heart: Songs from R.D. Burman's Bollywood was released in US. The album was nominated for a Grammy Award in 2006, for Best Contemporary World Music Album. In the 1990s, a friend introduced David Harrington of Kronos Quartet to the song "Aaj Ki Raat." Harrington was mesmerised, and the song ended up on the album Kronos Caravan.

Also in 2005, The Black Eyed Peas sampled her songs "Ae Naujawan Sab Kuchh Yahan" (Apradh, 1972) and "Yeh Mera Dil Pyaar Ka Diwana" (Don, 1978) in their hit single "Don't Phunk with My Heart". In late 2006, Bhosle collaborated with Australian test cricket star, Brett Lee. The single, "You're the One for Me", debuted at number 4 on the charts and reached a peak position of number 2.

In 2006, Bhosle recorded one song for the soundtrack of the Pakistani movie Mein Ek Din Laut Kay Aaaonga. She sang the song titled "Dil Key Taar Bajey", with Pakistani pop singer Jawad Ahmed. It was aired as part of the film's promotional campaign and became very popular, featuring on top music charts.

In 2023, on her 90th birthday, Bhosle performed a Broadway-style live show at Dubai's Coca-Cola Arena, where she both sang and danced. At the press conference announcing the show, she declared: "Mein iss film industry ki aakhri Mughal hoon" ("I am the last Mughal of the film industry"), referring to her longevity and creative association with generations of musicians and filmmakers.

In 2026, Bhosle featured on British virtual band Gorillaz's ninth studio album The Mountain, on the track "The Shadowy Light".

== Bengali career ==
Bhosle sang her first Bengali song in 1958 under the banner of His Master's Voice. The songs were music by Sudhin Dasgupta and Binod Chattopadhyay. On the next year, she recorded her "Pooja Songs" from His Master's Voice with music composed by Manna Dey. She sang many Pooja songs in Bengali. Among her popular puja albums was Pujoy Asha, released in 2018.

Rahul Dev Burman converted some Hindi tracks to Bengali such as "Gunjone Dole Je Bhramar" (made from Gunguna Rahe Hain Bhanware in Aradhana), "Chokhe Name Bristi" (from Jane Kya Baat Hai), "Aaj Gun Gun Gun Kunje" (from Pyaar Deewana Hota Hain). In the mid-1970s, she would frequently sing for Bengali songs tuned by Sudhin Dasgupta, Nachiketa Ghosh etc. In 1971, she sang the Rabindra Sangeet "Megher Kole Rod Hesechhe" in Kuheli, under the music direction of Hemanta Mukherjee. In 1977, she sang the duet "Sara Pyaar Tumhara" with Kishore Kumar in Anand Ashram and "Amar Swapno Tumi" in its Bengali version with the same title, under the music direction of Shyamal Mitra. In the 1970s, she sang a lot of songs in films such as Chhadmabeshi, Bandi, Mouchak, Swayamsiddha, Amanush, Anand Ashram etc. In 1981, she sang the duet "Aadho Aalo Chhayate" with Kishore in Kalankini Kankabati. In 1982, she sang the Bhajan "Kunjo Bihari He Giridhari" in Mayer Ashirbad, In the same year, she sang "Kotha Hoyechilo" in Troyee. In 1987, she sang "Chirodini Tumi Je Amar" in Amar Sangee, composed by Bappi Lahiri. In 2014, she created the album "Pancham Tumi Kothay" in honor of her husband Rahul Dev Burman's 75th birth anniversary. In this album she sang 8 songs previously composed by Burman. She also sang in a 2014 film Paarapaar at the age of 81.

== Marathi career ==
Bhosle started her playback singing in Marathi with the mythological film Gokulcha Raja. Thereafter Bhosle sang thousands of Marathi film songs, Bhavgeet (non-film songs). Natya sangeet from Master Deenanath Mangeshkar's Marathi Sangeet natak was also recorded in Bhosle's voice. During the 1950s and 60s, Bhosle and her sister Lata were the main playback singers for Marathi films. She won the 1962 Maharashtra State Film Award for Best Female Playback Singer for the Marathi film, Manini. In 1963 music director Vasant Desai used her voice with Talat Mahmood in the film, Molkarin.

Some Marathi films in which Bhosle rendered her voice are: Molkarin, Jait Re Jait, Gharkul, Devbappa, Sangtye Aika, Sinhasan, Samna, Maratha Tituka Melvava, and Nivdung.

Bhosle also sang many Marathi devotional songs (abhang) with music composed by Shrinivas Khale.

== Personal life ==
At the age of 16, Asha eloped with 31-year-old Ganpatrao Bhosle, her sister Lata Mangeshkar's personal secretary and married him against her family's wishes. Following their wedding, her husband and in-laws mistreated her. After a few years of marriage, Bhosle was turned out by a suspicious Ganpatrao and she went to her maternal home with two children while pregnant with her third child. They separated in 1960.

The eldest of her three children, Hemant Bhosle (named after Hemant Kumar), spent most of his early years as a pilot and quit to have a brief career as a music director. Hemant's best known compositions are the Kishore-Bhosle duets from the film Anpadh: "Aji Kaho Kya Haal Hai" picturised on Vijendra Ghatke and "Sarika" and "Salamat Raho Tum" picturised on Ashok Kumar and Sarika. Hemant died of cancer in 2015.

Bhosle's daughter Varsha committed suicide on 8 October 2012; she was 56 years old and worked as a columnist for The Sunday Observer and Rediff. Bhosle's youngest child, Anand Bhosle, studied business and film direction. He managed Bhosle's career. Her granddaughter Zanai Bhosle (daughter of Anand Bhosle) runs iAzure Apple Inc. store in Mumbai. Zanai is an emerging singer and Kathak dancer and sang with Bhosle.She also had two grandsons, Chaitanya Bhosle (through her elder son, Hemant) and Ranjai Bhosle (through her younger son, Anand).

Bhosle married Rahul Dev Burman in 1980 after a protracted romance despite opposition from Rahul's mother to their relationship. This was the second marriage for both Rahul and Bhosle. Rahul, 6 years younger than her, got divorced from Rita Patel in 1971.

Bhosle enjoyed cooking. In an interview with The Times of India, she said that had she not become a singer, she would have been a cook. She founded a restaurant chain, Ashaʼs, which offers traditional north-western Indian cuisine.

=== Rivalry with Lata Mangeshkar ===
Bhosle's sibling rivalry with Lata Mangeshkar garnered media attention, despite denials from the pair regarding a rivalry. As young children, they were very close. As a child, Lata used to carry Bhosle all the time. They were so inseparable that when Lata went to school she would take Bhosle with her. One day the teacher protested that they cannot have two students on one fee. Lata refused to return to school without Bhosle and quit her studies.

Lata considered Bhosle's act of eloping as irresponsible, leaving her alone to sing and earn for the family. This led to tension between them. Bhosle herself stated in an interview – "It was a love marriage and Lata didi did not speak to me for a long time. She disapproved of the alliance." At one time, their relationship was very adversarial and there have been periods of non-communication.

In her initial days in the industry, Bhosle always played second fiddle to her elder sister. Some say that Lata had once criticised Bhosle's relationship with O. P. Nayyar. This widened the rift between the two sisters and O. P. Nayyar also decided that he would never work with Lata. O. P. Nayyar had once revealed that "Asha and Lata, staying in opposite flats at Bombay's Pedder Road, shared a maid. Said maid's responsibility was to come and tell the younger sister that Lata had just recorded something wonderful for Bhosle to lose her vocal poise. Such was her Lata phobia that it took me some months to convince Bhosle that she had a voice individualistic enough to evolve a singing style all of her own." Bhosle once said that she had worked for years to curate a voice and a style that was different from Lata, so that she could carve her own niche and not be banished to live in her sister's shadow.

Bhosle and Lata also sang together. Their first duet was for the film Daman (1951). Some of their songs include "Man Bhawan Ke Ghar aye" (Chori Chori, 1956), "Sakhi ri sun bole papihaa us paar" (Miss Mary, 1957), "O chand jahaan woh jayein" (Sharada, 1957), "Mere Mehboob Mein Kya Nahi" (Mere Mehboob, 1963), "Unse Nazrein Mili" (Gazal, 1964), "Ai kash kisi deewane ko" (Aaye Din Bahar Ke, 1966), "Jabse Laagi Toose Najariya" (Shikar, 1968), "Main Haseena Nazneena Koi Mujhsa Nahi" (Baazi, 1968), "Main Chali Main Chali" (Padosan, 1968), "Chhap tilak sab" (Main Tulsi Tere Aangan Ki, 1978), and "Man kyun behka" (Utsav, 1984). While singing, Lata used to hold her notebook in her right hand, while Bhosle held hers in the left hand. This meant Lata had her face away from Bhosle, making it difficult for them to "anticipate" each other.

The film Saaz was supposedly based on Lata and Bhosle's rivalry. Bhosle said about the movie – "To have two women in long plaits, take a couple of incidents and exaggerate them into a 3-hour film is such a waste of time." In the last few years, Bhosle and Lata have often been seen in public, enjoying each other's company. In an interview with The Times of India, Bhosle said – "I remember, sometimes both of us would be at a function and some industry types would ignore me and interact only with her, as if to prove their loyalty. Later, didi and I would have a good laugh!"

== Death ==
On 11 April 2026, Bhosle was hospitalised at Breach Candy Hospital in Mumbai due to exhaustion and pulmonary chest infection. Her granddaughter Zanai Bhosle announced her admission via social media, requesting privacy during the treatment. She died on 12 April, at the age of 92, due to multiple organ failure.

Following the announcement of her death several tributes were paid to her including from Prime Minister Narendra Modi, Home Minister Amit Shah and West Bengal Chief Minister Mamata Banerjee. Film industry figures, such as A. R. Rahman, Akshay Kumar, and Suniel Shetty offered public condolences. A moment of silence was observed before the IPL match between Mumbai Indians and Royal Challengers Bengaluru at Wankhede Stadium in Mumbai, and players from both teams were spotted wearing black armbands as a tribute.

Her last rites were performed with full state honors at Shivaji Park on 13 April 2026.

== In popular culture ==
British alternative rock band Cornershop released "Brimful of Asha" in 1997. The song, dedicated to Bhosle, became an international hit single for the band and topped the UK Singles Chart in February 1998. A number of remixes have been released as well, notably by Norman Cook, also known as Fatboy Slim.

== Awards ==
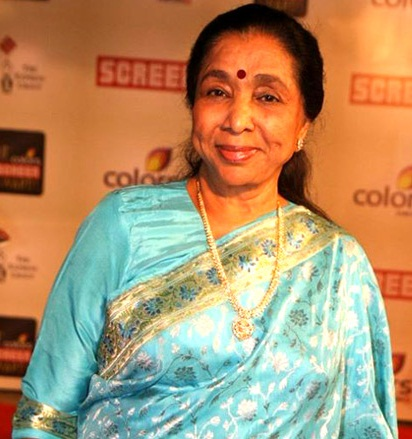
Asha Bhosle at the 18th Annual Colors Screen Awards in 2012

=== National honors ===
India :

  - Padma Vibhushan (2008) by the Government of India.
- In 2018, She was honoured with Banga Bibhushan by the Government of West Bengal.
- In 2021, Bhosle was honoured with the Maharashtra Bhushan by the Government of Maharashtra.

=== Filmfare awards ===
Asha Bhosle had won seven Filmfare Best Female Playback Awards of 18 nominations. She won her first two awards in 1967 and 1968. (Mangeshkar asked not to be considered for the award nominations after 1969 to promote new talent). After receiving the award in 1979, Bhosle emulated her elder sister and requested that her name not be considered for the nominations hereafter. Despite this, Bhosle is the most frequent winner of this award to date, tying with Alka Yagnik. She was later given a Special Award for Rangeela in 1996, and the Filmfare Lifetime Achievement Award in 2001. Following is the list of her Filmfare Awards:

==== Filmfare Best Female Playback Award ====
- 1967: "Garibon ki Suno" (Dus Lakh, 1966)
- 1969: "Parde Mein Rehne Do" (Shikar, 1968)
- 1972: "Piya Tu Ab To Aaja" (Caravan, 1971)
- 1973: "Dum Maro Dum" (Hare Rama Hare Krishna, (1971)
- 1974: "Hone Lagi Hai Raat" (Naina, 1973)
- 1975: "Chain Se Humko Kabhi" (Pran Jaye Par Vachan Na Jaye, 1974)
- 1979: "Yeh Mera Dil" (Don, 1978)

==== Special Award ====
- 1996 – Special Award (Rangeela, 1995)

==== Lifetime Achievement Award ====
- 2001 – Filmfare Lifetime Achievement Award

=== National Film Awards ===
Bhosle won the National Film Award for Best Female Playback Singer twice:

- 1981: Dil Cheez Kya Hai (Umrao Jaan)
- 1986: Mera Kuch Samaan (Ijaazat)

=== IIFA Awards ===
IIFA Award for Best Female Playback

- 2002: "Radha Kaisa Na Jale" (Lagaan)

=== Grammys ===
Bhosle is one of the very few Indian artists who have been nominated at the Grammy Awards.

- 39th Grammy Awards - 1997

- Grammy Award for Best Global Music Album - Ali Akbar Khan's Legacy (nominated)

- 48th Grammy Awards - 2006

- Grammy Award for Best Contemporary World Music Album - You've Stolen My Heart (nominated)

=== Other awards ===
Bhosle won numerous other awards, including:

- 1987: Nightingale Of Asia Award (from the Indo–Pak Association, UK).
- 1989: Lata Mangeshkar Award (Government of Madhya Pradesh).
- 1997: Screen Videocon Award (for the album Jaanam Samajha Karo).
- 1997: MTV Award (for the album Jaanam Samajha Karo).
- 1997: Channel V Award (for the album Jaanam Samjha Karo).
- 1998: Dayawati Modi Award.
- 1999: Lata Mangeshkar Award (Government of Maharashtra)
- 2000: Singer of the Millennium (Dubai).
- 2000: Zee Gold Bollywood Award (for Mujhe Rang De from Thakshak).
- 2001: MTV Award (for Kambakht Ishq).
- 2002: BBC Lifetime Achievement Award (presented by the UK Prime Minister Tony Blair).
- 2002: Zee Cine Award for Best Playback Singer - Female (for Radha Kaise Na Jale from Lagaan).
- 2002: Zee Cine Special Award for Hall of Fame.
- 2002: Sansui Movie Award (for Radha Kaise Na Jale from Lagaan).
- 2003: Swaralaya Yesudas Award for outstanding contributions to Indian music.
- 2004: Living Legend Award by the Federation of Indian Chamber of Commerce and Industry.
- 2005: MTV Immies, Best Female Pop Act for Aaj Jaane Ki Zid Na Karo.
- 2005: Most Stylish People in Music.

=== Honours and recognitions ===
- In 1997, Bhosle became the first Indian singer to be nominated for the Grammy Award, for Legacy, an album with Ustad Ali Akbar Khan.
- She received seventeen Maharashtra State Awards.
- She received the Dadasaheb Phalke Award in 2000 for her outstanding contribution to Indian cinema.
- She holds honorary doctorates from the university of Amravati and University of Jalgaon in Literature and from the University of Salford in Arts.
- She received The Freddie Mercury Award for Outstanding Achievement in Arts.
- The Birmingham Film Festival paid her a special tribute in November 2002.
- She was among top 20 music icons of the past 50 years.
- In 2011, the Guinness Book of World Records officially acknowledged Bhosle, at The Asian Awards, as the most recorded artist in the history of music. She was awarded a certificate for "the most studio recordings (singles) from Sebastian Coe for recording up to 11,000 solo, duet and chorus-backed songs and in over 20 Indian languages since 1947". At the event she was also awarded the Lifetime Achievement Award.
- Asha Bhosle is the recipient of the first Doctor of Literature (D.Litt.) of the Jodhpur National University.
- BBC list of 100 inspiring women for 2015.

== See also ==
- Mangeshkar Family
