= Devli =

Devli may refer to:

- Deoli, Rajasthan: City in Rajasthan, India
- Devli (social group): Social group from Goa, India
