= S. Ramachandran =

S. Ramachandran may refer to:

- S. Ramachandran (filmmaker), Indian film journalist and director
- S. Ramachandran (scientist) (1934–2016), Indian biotechnologist
- S. M. Ramachandran, Indian politician in Tamil Nadu
- Srinivasan Ramachandran, Indian bioinformatician
- Subramaniam Ramachandran, missing Sri Lankan Tamil journalist
- N. S. Ramachandran (1908–?), Indian composer of Carnatic music
- Panruti S. Ramachandran (born 1937), Indian politician in Tamil Nadu
- V. S. Ramachandran (born 1951), Indian-American neuroscientist
- S. Ramachandran Pillai (born 1938), Indian communist politician from Kerala
- S. Ramachandran. Indian politician in Tamil Nadu
