= Madhav Shinde =

Madhav Shinde was a film director predominantly working in Marathi film industry. He was born on 3 October 1917 in Kolhapur, Maharashtra.He died on 19 August 1988 at the age of 71years in Kolhapur after a brief illness.

He is best known for the films Gruhdevta (1957), Kanyadaan (1960) and Manasala Pankh Astat (1961) for which he won the National Film Award for Best Feature Film in Marathi. He was associated with a film production company named 'Surel Chitra'. Most of his films had Vasant Prabhu as Music Composer, P Savlaram as lyricist, and Lata Mangeshkar as the main singer. Vasant Desai and Meena Mangeshkar also composed music for his films.

== Selected filmography ==
- wadal (1953)
- Kanchanga (1954)
- Gruhdevta (1957)
- Shikaleli Bayako (1959)
- Kanyadan (1960)
- Manasala Pankh Astat (1961)
- Bayakocha Bhau
- Dharma Kanya (1969)
- Sansar (1981)
