= Padmaja Phenany Joglekar =

Indian musician

- Born: 7 July 1962 (age 64)
- Known for: Hindustani Classical Music, Semi classical and devotional music

Padmaja Phenany Joglekar is a Hindustani Classical singer. She is a disciple of Padmavibhushan Pandit Jasraj., Padmavibhushan Pandit Ramnatayan & Padmashri Pandit Hridaynath Mangeshkar. She was awarded the Padma Shri Award in 2001.

== Early life ==
Brought up in the tradition of Indian classical music, Padmaja graduated in microbiology and opted for a career in music. Today she sings both Hindustani Classical ( Khayal, Thumri, Tappa etc.) and the light popular variety ( Gazals, Geet, Bhajans etc.).

== Personal life ==
She is married to Sunil Joglekar who is an Engineer and has a son Aditya

== Career ==
Joglekar started learning Hindustani Classical music under the guidance of the vocalist Jasraj. She took further training from the Sarangi maestro Pandit Ram Narayan and the music director Pandit Hridaynath Mangeshkar.

Her three albums titled Hee Shubhra Phulanchi Jwala, Rang Bawara Shravan and Ghar Nachale Nachela consist of Marathi poems written by poets like Kusumagraj, Indira Sant, Vinda Karandikar, Mangesh Padgaonkar, Shankar Ramani, Suresh Bhat, Grace & Shantabai Shelke. She has also released an album of Marathi Gazals and recently two albums titled Hey Gagana and He Sparsha Chandanyanche. Her latest Marathi album Megha Re was released in Diwali 2009.

In her album titled Geet Naya Gata Hoon, Padmaja sang poems written by former Prime Minister of India Hon Atal Bihari Vajpayee. She has also tuned and sung poems written by former Prime Minister Shri V P Singh, album to be released shortly.

She has released an Gazal Album ‘Zindagi ki Zuban’ and Hindi album of bhajans composed by Shri Anup Jalota titled "Mangaldeep". Another album of Gazals written by such great poets like Daag, Jigar, Ahmed Faraz, Dr. Bashir Badr etc. & are also in the making. Her latest album Rang consists of Sufi style songs in Hindi.

=== Concerts ===
Padmaja Joglekar has performed at various conferences in India and also had many concerts in the UK, United States, Canada, Singapore Australia and UAE including the Bruhan Maharashtra Mandal (BMM) 2013 convention held at Rhodes Island in July 2013.

- "Mangaldeep" a concert of Marathi Bhavgeet & poems. The concert includes the songs Padmaja has sung in the film Nivdung (Kenvha tari Pahate & Lavlav kari Paat), her composition of poems of Kusumagraj, Indira Sant, Shankar Ramani, Suresh Bhat etc. from her various albums (Hee shubhra phulanchi Jwala, Ranga Bavara Shravan, Ghara nachale Nachale etc.) and some Bandish and associated songs based on that bandish which she has learnt from her guruji Hridaynath Mangeshkar.
- "BhaktiRang", a concert of devotional music. It consists of Bhajans by Meera, Kabir, Tulsi, Nanak, and Rahim etc. They are mainly in Hindi with a few in Gujarati. She has been performing this concert since last two years and has also performed a few combined concerts with Shri Anup Jalota and Padmashri Purshottamdas ji Jalota. The press report of Chennai concert is available on the Hindu website whose address is
- "Mehefil -E -Gazal" consisting of gazals of shayars like Ghalib, Daag, Jigar, Bahadurshah Zafar, Faiz Ahmad Faiz, Momin, Mir Taki Mir etc. & living legends like Ahmad Faraz, Dr. Bashir Badr etc. In this concert she sings her own compositions as well as some popular ones.
- "Tere Sur aur mere Geet" - This is the latest concert launched in 2005. It consists of Classics of Hindi Film mainly 50's to 70's period consisting of compositions of such great composers like Pandit Ravi Shankar, Madan Mohan, Salil Choudhary, S D Burman, Jaidev, Sham Sundar, Vasant Desai & R D Burman. This is not an orchestra but a Mehfil.
