= Ashaʼs =

Indian restaurant chain founded by Asha Bhosle

Asha's
- Type: Private
- Industry: Restaurant
- Genre: Fine dining
- Founded: Dubai, United Arab Emirates (2002)
- Area served: Middle East; United Kingdom
- Key people: Asha Bhosle
- Website: ashasrestaurants.com

Asha's is an Indian fine-dining restaurant chain founded by the late Indian playback singer Asha Bhosle. The restaurant was first established in Dubai and has operated outlets in the Middle East and the United Kingdom.

== History ==
Asha's was founded in Dubai in 2002, with its first outlet opening at Wafi Mall. It was founded by Asha Bhosle, an Indian playback singer who predominantly worked in Indian cinema. According to interviews with Bhosle, the restaurant concept originated from her personal interest in cooking and her desire to present Indian cuisine in an international fine-dining format.

The brand later expanded beyond Dubai, opening locations in other international markets. In 2017, Bhosle inaugurated an outlet at Yas Mall, Abu Dhabi, continuing the brand's expansion in the Gulf region.

The restaurant has received international media attention due to visits by high-profile celebrities. Actor Tom Cruise was reported to have dined at the Birmingham restaurant during a film-related visit to the city. Singer Pink was also reported to have visited the Birmingham outlet prior to a concert.

== Cuisine ==
Asha's primarily serves North Indian cuisine, featuring a menu of traditional dishes adapted for a fine-dining setting. Bhosle stated in 2025 that she remained personally involved in the culinary direction of the brand and regularly visited the kitchens when in Dubai.

== Locations ==
Asha's has operated restaurants in Dubai, Abu Dhabi, Qatar, Bahrain, Kuwait, Manchester and Birmingham.
