= Devli (social group) =

Social group from Goa, India

Devli is a traditional community historically associated with service in temples in Goa, India. The term "Devli" is also used to refer to a small temple.

Historically, members of the Devli community played a significant role in the village system in Goa. Their primary responsibilities involved maintaining temples and assisting with religious rituals. These duties included cleaning the temple premises, preparing flowers and lamps for worship, and performing specific tasks during festivals or processions, such as ringing bells or playing musical instruments. The Devli community was traditionally granted fixed agricultural land by the local temple administration or village community for their maintenance. They also received a specific share of temple offerings, including rice and sweets, and were entitled to food offerings during religious festivals.

The Devli community is considered to have links with the ancient tradition of Devadasis (women dedicated to temple service). Scholars have suggested that this tradition may have been introduced to Goa by the Sumerians around 2300–2280 BCE. Following the migration of various groups to the region, including the Gaud Saraswat Brahmins, the practice became integrated into the local culture. Over time, this tradition evolved, leading to a division of responsibilities: one group focused on managing temple affairs and religious services, while the other provided artistic performances before the deity. While initially seen as a dedicated service to the temple, the status of the Devli community underwent changes over time.

Traditionally, women in the Devli community were considered wedded to the deity, a practice linked to the Devdasi system. They did not marry in the conventional sense but underwent a ritual known as Shens. In some historical instances, girls from the community were sent to families of higher-status men as a "Ghedi," a practice that has since ceased. Marriage within the community, as well as with members of other groups like the Bhavin, Bande, and Chedvan, is now recognized by society. Today, many families have moved away from their traditional roles, with younger generations pursuing modern education and professions. The community is now often referred to as the Gomantak Maratha Samaj.
