= Mai (2013 film) =

- Directed by: Mahesh Kodiyal
- Written by: Mahesh Kodiyal; Manoj Tapasya
- Produced by: Alliance Entertainment; Rhythm D'vine Entertainment Pvt. Ltd., Madhusudan Group
- Starring: Asha Bhosle; Padmini Kolhapure; Ram Kapoor
- Cinematography: Sachin K. Krishn
- Edited by: Ashish Amrute
- Music by: Nitin Shankar
- Release date: 1 February 2013
- Country: India
- Language: Hindi

Mai (transl. Mother) is a 2013 Indian Hindi-language film which marks the debut of veteran singer Asha Bhosle as a lead actress. The film is a family drama of how children abandon their ailing old parents. The film is also the debut directorial venture of Mahesh Kodiyal.

== Plot ==
Mai, a widowed mother of four, is a 65-year-old woman with Alzheimer's disease who lives with her only son, Munna. When Munna gets an opportunity to move to USA for his job, he decides to admit Mai in an old age home. But Mai's eldest daughter Madhu objects to this. After the other two daughters also abandon Mai for various reasons, Madhu decides to bring Mai to her own home. Madhu's husband Subhash and teenage daughter Charu dislike this. After a series of events Madhu's family accepts Mai lovingly in their family but she dies.

== Cast ==
- Asha Bhosle as Mai
- Padmini Kolhapure as Madhu, Mai's eldest daughter
- Ram Kapoor as Subhash Joshi, Mai's son-in-law, Madhu's husband, Charu's father
- Shivani Joshi as Charu, Madhu's daughter
- Kshitee Jog as Mai's second daughter
- Anupam Kher as the Doctor (Cameo role)

== Production ==
The film features playback singer Asha Bhosle in the title role. Bhosle debuted through this film as an actress at the age of 79. Padmini Kolhapure, who is the real-life niece of Bhosle, played the role of her eldest daughter.

Bhosle dedicated the film to her mother, who was also lovingly called "Mai". About her acting experience, she says that she did not find acting difficult but also states that this will be her "only experiment with acting".

== Music ==
Manoj Tapadia and Sahil Sultanpuri penned the film's songs. The score is composed by music director Nithin R Shankar. Sahil Sultanpuri brings his first song "Dhakku Makum", Tapadia has previously written songs of the films Manorama Six Feet Under and Cheeni Kum, both of 2007. The song "Dhakku Makum" features the popular Marathi traditional song "Yere Yere Pausa" which is sung by Zanai Bhosle, Asha Bhosle's granddaughter. The song is a rain dance sequence choreographed by Lollypop, known for the choreography of "Aati Kya Khandala" and was released at Lalbaugcha Ganpati on 19 September 2012 on the occasion of Ganesh Chaturthi. The complete music album was released on 22 January 2013 by Sachin Tendulkar.

No.	Title	Lyrics	Singer(s)	Length
1.	"Mai"	Manoj Tapadia	Asha Bhosle
2.	"Chanda Ki Bindiya"	Manoj Tapadia	Asha Bhosle
3.	"Dhakku Makum"	Sahil Sultanpuri	Amit Kumar, Zanai Bhosle
4.	"Loag Yahaan"	Manoj Tapadia	Sukhwinder Singh
5.	"Learn To Adjust"	Manoj Tapadia	Arjun Kanungo, Payal Dev

== Reception ==
Professional ratings
Review scores
Source	Rating
NDTV	3.5/5 stars
Rediff	3/5 stars
The Times of India	2.5/5 stars
Mid-Day	2/5 stars

The film released for audiences on 1 February 2013 with a grand premier on the previous night at Cinemax, Versova. The premier was attended by notable personalities of Bollywood like Amitabh Bachchan, Shatrughan Sinha, Sridevi, Tanuja, and more.

In their review, various critics appreciated Bhosle's performance but criticised the film for clichéd plot. Filmfare also appreciated Bhosle by writing that she "weaves magic but not enough to save a mediocre movie".
