= Chokhe Chokhe Kotha Bolo =

1971 song by Asha Bhosle

"Chokhe Chokhe Katha Balo"
- CD cover featuring Asha Bhosle

Single by Asha Bhosle
- Language: Bengali
- English title: You speak with your eyes, but no words from your mouth
- Released: 1971
- Length: 3:26
- Label: Saregama
- Composer: R. D. Burman
- Lyricist: Gauriprasanna Mazumder
- Producer: R. D. Burman

Lyrical video
- "Chokhe Chokhe Katha Balo" on YouTube

"Chokhe Chokhe Kotha Bolo" is a Bengali-language romantic song by Indian singer Asha Bhosle. The song was written by Gauriprasanna Mazumder and composed and produced by singer R. D. Burman. It serves as a popular and nostalgic song played during the Durga Puja festival in Bengal and is among the most popular Bengali songs performed by Asha Bhosle.

== Background ==
"Chokhe Chokhe Kotha Bolo" is an example of a staple song of Durga Puja which is a single and does not belong to any film. The song "ruled the pandals [temples]" from the first time when it was released in 1971 with its composition by R. D Burman. It performed well and was played in crowded pandals.

== Reception ==
Agnivo Niyogi of The Telegraph writes that the song was not loud or dramatic, but "struck a chord".

== Adaptation ==
A Hindi remake of the song titled "Nahi Nahi Abhi Nahin" sung by Kishore Kumar and Asha Bhosle was written by Anand Bakshi, where R. D. Burman assisted Bakshi and Ramesh Behl in composing the song. R. D. Burman adapted the song's music from the original Bengali song written by Gauriprasanna Mazumder and released in 1971.

== Performances ==
Asha Bhosle visited Durgapur for a concert on February 12, 1984, and the event was arranged by SMS Recreation Club. She performed songs on a stage at the Hostel Avenue Ground in the DSP Township, which Lata Mangeshkar sang at the previous year. Anjan, also known as Toton Das was an organizer of the Bhosle's concert. In the event, she started the concert by singing "Chokhe Chokhe Kotha Bolo", in which she was accompanied by her husband R. D. Burman.

Indian singer Sunidhi Chauhan sang a cover version of song during a concert in Kolkata, West Bengal on March 26, 2026. Chauhan initially started by singing Hindi songs and some of her previously-sung songs. Despite singing many hit songs in the concert, she also talked to the audience in-between. Chauhan sang it on stage with her own vocals without any significant change in the music, emotions or depth from the original song. Priyanka Mukherjee of Hindustan Times wrote that the entire concert hall became silent when Chauhan took up the microphone and started singing it, when the audience was waiting for a Hindi song. Mukherjee writes that the simplicity of the original song and her vocals "created a strangely clam atmosphere". Most of the audience lit up their phone lights and joined in her singing.
