= Rajaram Painginkar =

Indian social reformer

Portrait of Rajaram Painginkar

Rajaram Rangaji Painginkar was an Indian social reformer, industrialist, and classical musician from Goa. He is noted for his significant contributions to the social upliftment of the Gomantak Maratha Samaj and his involvement in religious and educational reforms.

== Early life and education ==
Rajaram Rangaji Painginkar was born in the village of Poinguinim in the Canacona taluka of Goa into a family belonging to the Gomantak Maratha Samaj. He began his schooling in Painginim at the age of eight and later completed his primary education in Loliem.

In 1906, Painginkar moved to Bombay, where he sought classical musical training. He formally became a disciple of Raghunathji Mashelkar, under whom he studied the tabla. He worked as a professional tabla accompanist to make a living. During this period, he developed a deep interest in reading historical literature. This passion led him to collaborate with local youth to establish the "Dattaprasad Vachan Mandir," a reading room and library.

He later married Seeta Kinnar from Karwar.

== Social reform and activism ==
Painginkar's career as a social reformer was influenced by the writings of Hirabai Nageshkar and Dada Vaidya, which focused on social issues and the status of women. Inspired to act against social injustices, he sought the guidance of Gopalmama Jambavlikar and, in 1910, initiated movements against practices such as the Veshya (prostitution) system and religious rituals associated with caste-based exploitation.

He worked to unite various sub-castes, including the Naik, Bande, Farjat, Devali, Bhavin, and Perni, to form a cohesive social identity. His reform efforts included promoting the education of children from marginalized backgrounds, abolishing the dowry system, facilitating the marriage of women who wished to leave the traditional systems and lead settled lives, and organizing widow remarriages.

Painginkar established his base in Bombay to further the cause of the Gomantak Maratha Samaj. He received support from various community members and leaders, including Parshuram Kakodkar, Sitaram Painginkar, and Dr. Laxmanrao Dharwadkar. Journalists such as Dr. Shirgaonkar (editor of Prabhat) and Hegde Desai (editor of Bharat) also aided his movement by publishing articles to raise social awareness.

In February 1921, he organized a public Satyanarayan Puja in Painginim, an event that became widely discussed across Goa.

== Institutional work and later years ==
From 1925 to 1932, Painginkar was actively involved with the Pragatik Maratha Samaj and the Portuguese Shikshan Prasarak Maratha Samaj. In 1929, he organized a community parishad (conference) in Shiroda, presided over by Ramchandra N. Velingkar. This is when the Gomantak Maratha Samaj organization was officially named.

He dedicated 58 years of his life to these social movements. Under the auspices of the Samaj, he started boarding houses for students. His legacy is commemorated by the naming of the central hall in the Gomantak Maratha Samaj building in Panaji after him.

At the age of 80, Painginkar authored his autobiography titled Mi Kon? (Who Am I?), written in Marathi. The book covers his life with honesty and in detail. He used the proceeds from its sale to fund student welfare. Critics and historians view his life as a blend of social reform and industrial success that significantly impacted Goan society.

Anjali Arondekar writes about Painginkar and the work he did to protect his community in the 2023 book, Abundance: Sexuality's History.
