= Dil Padosi Hai =

Studio album by Asha Bhosle
- Released: 9 August 1987
- Recorded: 1987
- Studio: HMV Studios
- Genres: Hindi classical; Ghazal-influenced art pop
- Label: The Gramophone
- Producer: R. D. Burman

Dil Padosi Hai is a 1987, private Indian music album by Asha Bhosle, in collaoration with the composer and music director R. D. Burman and lyricist Gulzar. The songs of the album were all penned by Gulzar, composed by Burman, and sung by Bhosle, on whose birthday, September 8, 1987, the album was released in Mumbai.

== Track listing ==
The album comprises 14 songs:

1. "Bheeni Bheeni Bhor"
2. "Koi Diya Jale Kahin"
3. "Manjhi Re Manjhi"
4. "Juthe Tere Nain"
5. "Jaane Do Mujhe"
6. "Saawan Sasura Sataye"
7. "Aye Zindagi"
8. "Umeed Hogi Koi"
9. "Sham Se Aankh Mein Nami Si Hai"
10. "Haan Mere Gham"
11. "Rishte Bante Hain"
12. "Raat Chup Chaap"
13. "Saaton Baar Bole Bansi"
14. "Raat Christmas Ki Thi"

== Release ==
Bombay: The City Magazine wrote a positive review of the film: "Dil Padosi Hai fully exploits Bhosale's rich and versatile voice tripping through Gulzar's exquisite lyrics and Burman's gusty music". Subhash K. Kha listed the number "Umid Hogi Koi" as one of Bhosle's most underrated, and said the album "featured a feast of masterpieces". The Telegraph also reviewed the album positively when it released, writing that "the overall charm of experimentation and sincerity cannot be missed".
