= Varsha Bhosle =

Indian singer, journalist and writer (1956–2012)

- Born: 1956; Nagpur, India
- Died: 8 October 2012 (aged 55–56); Mumbai, Maharashtra, India
- Cause of death: Suicide by shooting
- Education: Elphinstone College
- Occupations: Singer; columnist
- Spouse: Hemant Kenkre (before 1998)
- Parents: Asha Bhosle (mother); Ganpatrao Bhosle (father); R. D. Burman (stepfather)
- Family: Mangeshkar family and Manikya dynasty (in-laws)

Varsha Bhosle (1956 – 8 October 2012) was an Indian singer, journalist and writer based in Mumbai. She was the daughter of acclaimed playback singer Asha Bhosle.

== Career ==
Bhosle was a professional Hindi and Bhojpuri playback singer, and appeared in concerts with her mother. Varsha finished her schooling from Hill Grange High School, on Pedder Road, Mumbai, in 1973, with an ISC. She studied Political Science at Elphinstone College, which is affiliated with Bombay University in Mumbai.

She wrote columns for the Indian web portal Rediff during 1997 – 2003; columns for The Sunday Observer during 1994 – 1998; and for Gentleman magazine in 1993. She also wrote a few articles for The Times of India and Rakshak – The Protector police magazine.

== Personal life ==
Varsha lived in Mumbai with her mother. She had married a sports writer and public relations professional Hemant Kenkre but the couple divorced in 1998.

She had a history of depression, exacerbated by the death of a close friend, and underwent psychiatric treatment. On 9 September 2008, she reportedly attempted suicide by taking an overdose of prescribed medicine, after which she was admitted to Mumbai's Jaslok hospital. On 8 October 2012, Bhosle committed suicide at her Prabhu Kunj residence in Mumbai. Her body was discovered by her mother's driver and maid in a pool of blood on the sofa at her home. Mumbai Police later confirmed the suicide and said she shot herself in the head with a licensed weapon.
