= You're the One for Me (Brett Lee song) =

Single by Brett Lee featuring Asha Bhosle

from the album Asha and Friends, Vol. 1
- Released: 8 January 2007
- Recorded: India: October 2006
- Genre: Pop
- Length: 3:59
- Songwriter: Brett Lee

"You're the One For Me" (Hindi: Haan Main Tumhara Hoon) is a song written by Australian cricketer Brett Lee during the 2006 ICC Champions Trophy in India. It was released as a duet featuring Lee and Bollywood star Asha Bhosle.

The lyrics were reportedly written in 30 minutes by Lee between practice sessions at the Champions Trophy.

The song tells the story of a westerner, played in the video clip by Brett Lee, trying to woo a young Indian woman. Asha Bhosle plays the role of an advisor, teaching him Hindi in order to impress the girl. Lee, who plays in a band known as "Six & Out" with some New South Wales teammates, plays guitar and sings in English as well as in Hindi.

Like many Indian songs, "You're the One for Me" has a distinct Bollywood flavour, visible both in the musical style of the piece and the arrangement of the video clip.

== Chart success ==
"You're the One for Me" has achieved relative success in India, owing greatly to Lee's cult status as an international Cricketer and Bhosle's popularity as a Bollywood singer. Upon release, the song debuted at #4 on the Indian Singles Chart and reached as high as #2. It is unknown whether it will be released into other markets but the song has since been discovered by Lee's compatriots and is being given frequent rotational on Australian radio stations.

== Chart position ==
Chart (2007)	Peak position
Indian Singles Chart	2
