= S. Ramachandran (filmmaker) =

Indian film journalist and film director

- Born: Kolkata, West Bengal, India
- Occupations: Film Director, Film Journalist
- Spouse: Sonal Ramachandran
- Parent(s): VS Srinivasan; Krishnaveni

S. Ramachandran is an Indian film journalist and filmmaker who has directed several music videos in collaboration with Mauj Music. He has also worked on music videos featuring artists such as Asha Bhosle, Sanjay Dutt, Brett Lee, and Urmila Matondkar.

== Career ==
Ramachandran played a significant role in the promotion and public relations of Pooja Bhatt's film Holiday (2006) and was similarly involved in the marketing and PR activities for another Bhatt project, Jism 2 (2012), starring Sunny Leone. For the latter film, he additionally contributed to the film's production through his companies Sanskriti Media and Entertainment and Brandstand.

Ramachandran has directed music videos for Mauj Music, featuring Asha Bhosle and a lineup of celebrities under the banner "Asha & Friends." He also directed music videos featuring Asha Bhosle, Sanjay Dutt, Brett Lee, Urmila Matondkar, Ismail Darbar, Zubeen Garg, and Neetu Chandra, collectively known as "Rasiya Saajan."

Ramachandran ventured into producing, with projects such as the short film Talk To Me, which was submitted to various film festivals. He was one of the producers for the film Imaandaari ki Maa Ki Aankh, for which the inaugural clap was given by Pooja Bhatt. He served as an associate producer for the film Doctor I Love You.

== Early years and personal life ==
Ramachandran was born in Kolkata at the Saradadevi hospital at the Ramakrishna Mission. He was born to Krishnaveni and VS Srinivasan. Srinivasan was working in the Indian Express Newspaper in Mumbai.
