= Hridaynath Mangeshkar =

Indian singer (born 1937)

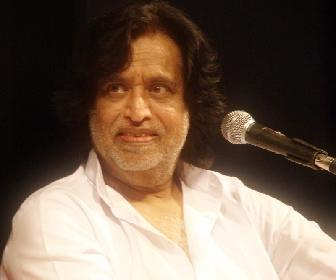
- Hridaynath Mangeshkar in 2008
- Born: 26 October 1937 (age 89); Sangli, Madhya Pradesh, British India (present-day Maharashtra, India)
- Occupations: Record producer; composer; playback singer
- Years active: 1952–present
- Father: Deenanath Mangeshkar
- Family: Mangeshkar family
- Honours: Padma Shri
- Musical career
- Genres: Indian folk music; filmi; classical; semi-classical; folk; orchestral
- Instruments: Harmonium, Tabla

Pandit Hridaynath Mangeshkar (Marathi pronunciation: [ɦɾud̪əjnaːt̪ʰ məŋɡeːʃkəɾ]; born 26 October 1937) is an Indian music director and singer. He is the only son of musician Pandit Deenanath Mangeshkar as well as younger brother of Lata Mangeshkar and Asha Bhosle. He is popularly known as Balasaheb in the music and film industry. He received the Filmfare Marathi Lifetime Achievement Award for his contributions to Marathi cinema. He was honoured with V. Shantaram Lifetime Achievement Award by the Government of Maharashtra.

== Career ==
Hridaynath debuted his music career in 1955 with the Marathi film Akash Ganga. Since then, he has composed music for various Marathi films such as Sansar, Chaani, Ha Khel Savalyancha, Janaki, Jait Re Jait, Umbartha and Nivdung and a few Bollywood films; the most notable among them being Subah, Lekin... and Maya Memsaab.

Mangeshkar has been very selective with his work. He has composed songs in Marathi and Hindi. His songs often have complex meters and require singers of great range and depth for enjoyable renditions. His composition of Vinayak Damodar Savarkar's poem Saagara Pran Talamalala is a case in point. His 1982 album Dnyaneshwar Mauli, featuring compositions from Jñāneśvar, one of the most famous poets in Marathi literature, set the standard for modern devotional music in Marathi.

Mangeshkar also composed music for the Doordarshan musical drama Phoolwanti. He has also composed folk songs. Staying true to the spirit, his Koli Geets (fishermen songs) reflect the traditional rhythms of the fishermen of Konkan. His music for the critically acclaimed movie Jait Re Jait is another example of his prowess in this genre. One of his most popular works is the composition for the Marathi film Nivdung.

At one point, Hridaynath was a student of Ustad Amir Khan; however, he feels that his guru is not as timeless as his sister Lata.

Mangeshkar has been the recipient of several awards throughout his career, such as the prestigious National Award at the hands of the President of India, the Lata Mangeshkar Award of Maharashtra state, and seven Maharashtra State Awards for Best Vocalist and Music Director/Composer.

Mangeshkar was awarded the title pandit by the people of Maharashtra at the hands of Bhimsen Joshi and Jasraj. The Shankaracharya has conferred upon him the title Bhaav Gandharva.

Mangeshkar was awarded Padma Shri by the Government of India in 2009.

A few of his most memorable Hindi film scores are Harishchandra Taramati, Prarthana, Chakra, Lekin..., Maya Memsaab, Lal Salaam, Yash Chopra's Mashaal, Dhanwan and Chaani.

Mangeshkar is also the first Indian composer to compose and release two entire albums featuring the poems and songs of the poet-saint Meera, titled Chala Vahi Des and Meera Bhajans. In 2011, he composed and released an album titled Meera Soor Kabeera, featuring the works of Meera, Kabir and Surdas. He produced an album featuring the ghazals of Ghalib, titled Ghalib and sung by Lata Mangeshkar. His collaborations with Marathi poets such as Shanta Shelke and Suresh Bhat have produced many classic Marathi songs.

Mangeshkar joined the political party Shiv Sena in 2009.

== Filmography ==
Year	Film	Director	Language	Notes
1959	Aakashganga	Bhalji Pendharkar	Marathi	Debut as music director
1960	Antaricha Diva	Madhav Shinde	Marathi	
1966	Pavna Kathcha Dhondi	Anant Thakur	Marathi	
1968	Dharmakanya	Madhav Shinde	Marathi	
1970	Harishchandra Taramati	Pradeep Kumar	Hindi	
1976	Ha Khel Sawalyancha	Vasant Joglekar	Marathi	
1977	Jait Re Jait	Jabbar Patel	Marathi	Maharashtra State Film Award for Best Music Director
1977	Chaani	V. Shantaram	Marathi	
1979	Janaki	Vasant Joglekar	Marathi	
1979	Sinhasan	Jabbar Patel	Marathi	
1980	Sansar	Madhav Shinde	Marathi	
1981	Chakra	Rabindra Dharmaraj	Hindi	
1981	Dhanwan	Surendra Mohan	Hindi	
1982	Umbartha	Jabbar Patel	Marathi	
1984	Mashaal	Yash Chopra	Hindi	
1984	Ram Ki Ganga	Sharankumar Chand	Hindi	
1985	Anant Yatra	Jayoo Patwardhan, Nachiket Patwardhan	Hindi	
1985	Pyaari Bhabhi	K. C. Agarwal	Hindi	
1985	Mahananda	K. G. Korgaonkar	Marathi	
1986	Mere Saath Chal	Suresh Kumar Sharma	Hindi	
1987	Sarja	Rajdutt	Marathi	
1989	Nivdung	Mahesh Satoskar	Marathi	
1991	Lekin...	Gulzar	Hindi	
1993	Maya Memsaab	Ketan Mehta	Hindi	
1995	He Geet Jeevanache	Ram Gabale	Marathi	
2002	Laal Salaam	Gaganvihari Borate	Hindi	
2006	Sail	Gajendra Ahire	Marathi	
2007	Ek Krantiveer: Vasudev Balwant Phadke	Gajendra Ahire	Marathi	
2010	Khel Saat Baracha	Ajit Shirole	Marathi	
2010	Kas	Aruna Joglekar, Mahesh Satoskar	Marathi	
2014	Anvatt	Gajendra Ahire	Marathi	
2017	22 June	Sanjay Malvankar	Marathi	

== Awards ==
- 1978 (16th Maharashtra State Film Awards) – Maharashtra State Film Award for Best Music Director for Jait Re Jait.
- 1990 (38th National Film Awards) – National Film Award for Best Music Direction for Lekin...

Official citation: For using traditional tunes and instruments creatively, with lilting melody and haunting perfection.

- 2009 – Padma Shri

== See also ==
- Mangeshkar Family
