= Meena Khadikar =

Indian playback singer and composer (born 1931)

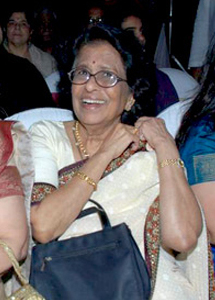
- Born: Meena Mangeshkar; 7 September 1931 (age 95)
- Occupations: Playback singer; vocalist
- Spouse: Dattatreya Khadikar (m. 1962)
- Children: 2
- Father: Deenanath Mangeshkar
- Relatives: See list
- Family: Mangeshkar family

Meena Khadikar (née Mangeshkar; born 7 September 1931) is an Indian Marathi and Hindi playback singer and composer. She is the second eldest daughter of Pandit Deenanath Mangeshkar and the sister of fellow singers Lata Mangeshkar, Asha Bhosle, Usha Mangeshkar and Hridaynath Mangeshkar.

== Career ==
Khadikar's work in Hindi cinema includes the songs Duniya Mein Hum Aaye Hain To from Mother India (sung with Lata Mangeshkar and Usha Mangeshkar), Phagun aaya from Pilpili Saheb, the duet Aapne chheen liya dil with Mohammed Rafi in the film Farmaish, Hai mausam yeh mastaana, muskuraana, dil churaana from Aabroo and Are koi jaao ri piya ko bulao from Patrani.

Khadikar is best known for composing music for the Marathi industry, including a popular kids' song and album Asawa Sunder Chocolatecha Bungla, which was later recorded in Bengali and Gujarati too. Khadikar's children Yogesh and Rachna sang the original song. Her song Saang Saang Bholanaath is also well known.

== Discography ==
Marathi Songs

- "Ye Javali Ghe Priyasakhaya Bhagavanta" – Mansala Pankh Astat Composer Meena Mangeshkar Singer Lata Mangeshkar
- "Bavarle Mi Bavarle"- Ek Hota Raja Best of the Song

Hindi Songs

- "Phagun Aaya" – Pilpili Saheb
- "Hai Mausam Yeh Mastaana Muskuraana Dil Churaana" – Aabroo
