= Mangeshkar family =

Indian family of musicians

- Current region: Mumbai, Maharashtra
- Members: Deenanath Mangeshkar; Lata Mangeshkar; Asha Bhosle; Varsha Bhosle; Usha Mangeshkar; Meena Khadikar; Hridaynath Mangeshkar
- Connected families: Mangeshkar-Hardikar-Abhisheki-Kolhapure extended family Manikya dynasty
- Traditions: Hindu

The Mangeshkar family (pronunciation: [maŋɡeːʃkəɾ]) is a prominent Indian family of musicians, headed by Deenanath Mangeshkar. The family is of Konkani origin.

== Overview ==
=== Deenanath Mangeshkar ===
The father of this famous musical family, Deenanath Mangeshkar, was born on 29 December 1900 in the village of Mangeshi (then in Portuguese India) to a temple pujari and handmaiden of the deity Mangesh. His father, Ganesh Bhatt Navathe (Abhisheki), was a married Karhade Brahmin who served as pujari at the famous Mangueshi Temple in Goa, and his mother was Ganesh's mistress, Yesubai, belonging to Gomantak Maratha Samaj. Since Deenanath's parents were not married to each other, he did not inherit his father's Brahmin caste and surname. Deenanath Mangeshkar had five children to Shevanti, namely Lata Mangeshkar, Asha Bhosle, Usha Mangeshkar, Meena Khadikar and Hridaynath Mangeshkar.

=== Lata Mangeshkar ===
Lata Mangeshkar was one of the best-known and most respected playback singers in India. She never married. She was known as the "Nightingale of India." She was conferred India's highest civilian award, the Bharat Ratna, in 2001. She died on 6 February 2022.

=== Asha Bhosle ===
Asha Bhosle was best known as a playback singer in Hindi cinema, although she has a wider repertoire. Asha, at the age of 16, had eloped with 31-year-old Ganpatrao Bhosle. They separated in 1960. They had three children and five grandchildren. The eldest of her three children, Hemant Bhosle (named after Hemant Kumar), spent most of his early years as a pilot and quit to have a brief career as a music director. Later he moved to Scotland, where he died in September 2015. Bhosle's daughter Varsha committed suicide on 8 October 2012. She was 56 years old and worked as a columnist for The Sunday Observer and Rediff.

Asha's youngest child, Anand Bhosle, has studied business and film direction. He manages Asha's career. Her grandson, Chaitanya (Chintu) Bhosle (Hemant's son) is a part of the world of music. He is a member of India's first & only boy band, "A Band of Boys".

Hemant Bhosle's best known compositions were the Kishore-Asha duets, such as Aji Kaho Kya Haal Hai from the film Anpadh, lip-synched by Vijendra Ghatke and Sarika, and Salamat Raho Tum from the same film, lip-synched by Ashok Kumar and Sarika. Hemant died of cancer in 2015. Hemant's son Chaitanya Bhosle is a singer and has a few albums to his name.

Asha's first husband, Ganpatrao, was her personal secretary. Their marriage failed miserably in 1960. Her husband and in-laws mistreated her. After a few years of marriage, Asha was turned out by a suspicious Ganpatrao, and she went to her maternal home with two children and pregnant with her third child. She continued to sing in films to earn money. Asha married Rahul Dev Burman in 1980. This was a second marriage for both Rahul and Asha. Rahul, six years younger than Asha, had earlier divorced Rita Patel in 1971. Asha Bhosale passed away on 12 April 2026, at the same age of 92 as Lata Mangeshkar did.

=== Usha Mangeshkar ===
Usha Mangeshkar is an Indian singer who has recorded many Hindi, Marathi, Bengali, Nepali, Bhojpuri and Gujarati songs. She remained unmarried.

=== Meena Khadikar ===
Meena Khadikar is an Indian Marathi and Hindi language playback singer and composer. She is also popular for composing various children's songs. She married Mr. Khadikar, who died around 2011. Her son Yogesh Khadikar has recorded a few songs. Yogesh is married to Jitendra Abhisheki's daughter.

=== Hridaynath Mangeshkar ===
Hridaynath Mangeshkar is a music composer and singer. He is married to Bharati Malvankar Mangeshkar, daughter of Marathi comedian Damuanna Malvankar. They have two sons, Aadinath Mangeshkar and Baijnath Mangeshkar, and a daughter, Radha Mangeshkar. In 2009, Radha launched her debut album Naav Maaza Shaami. She has been trained by Hridaynath and accompanies him in various stage shows.

== Photo gallery ==
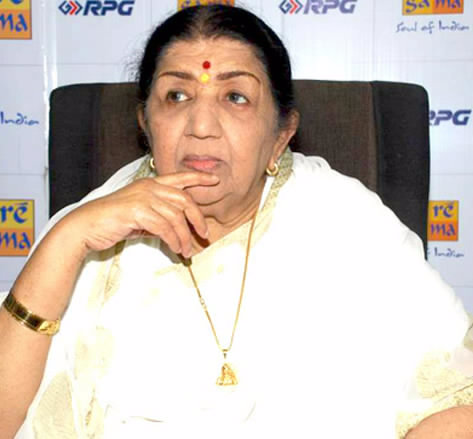
Lata Mangeshkar

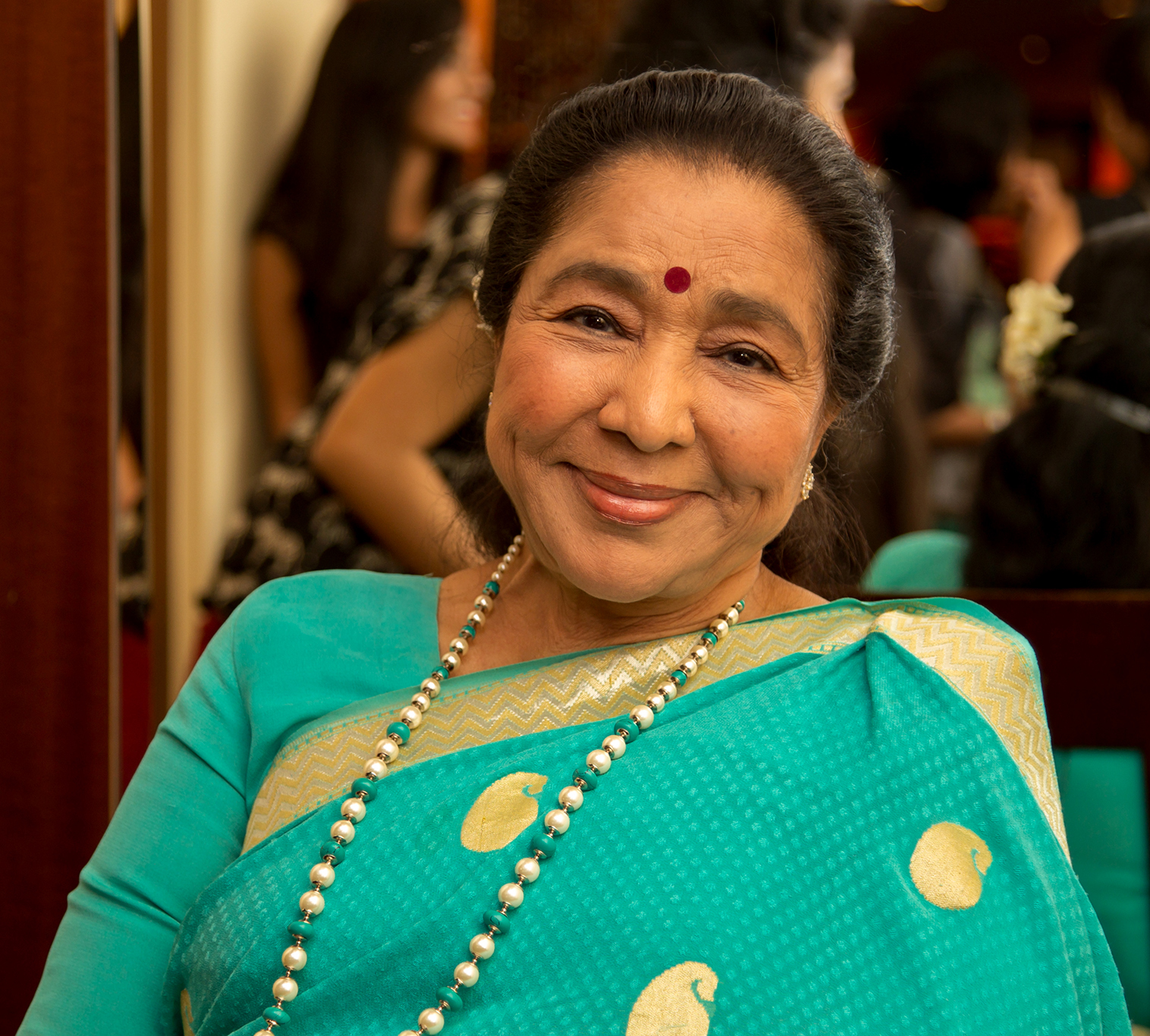
Asha Bhosle

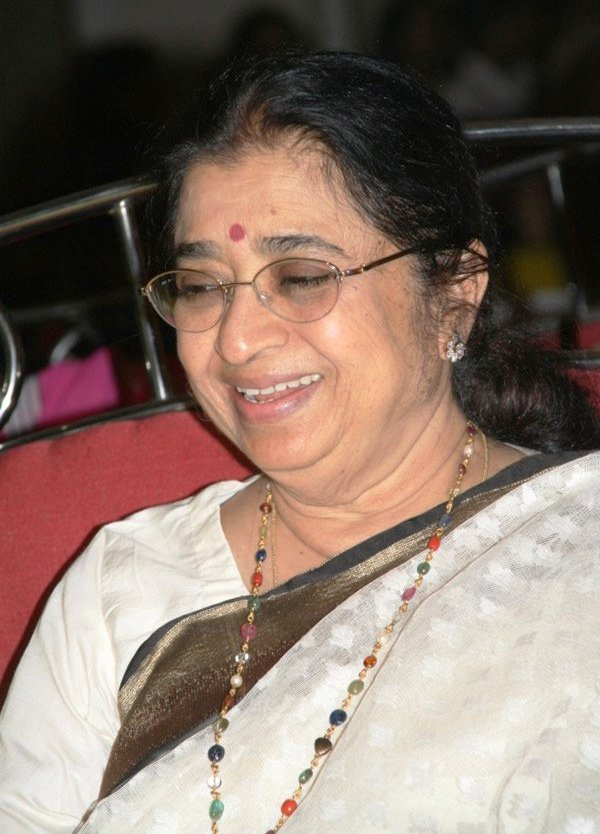
Usha Mangeshkar

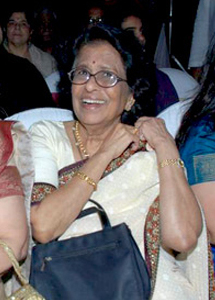
Meena Khadikar

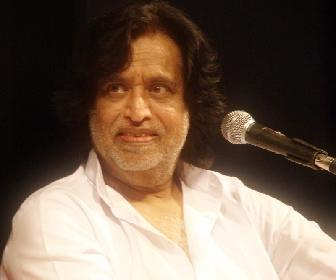
Hridaynath Mangeshkar
