= List of awards and nominations received by Lata Mangeshkar =

Lata Mangeshkar awards and nominations
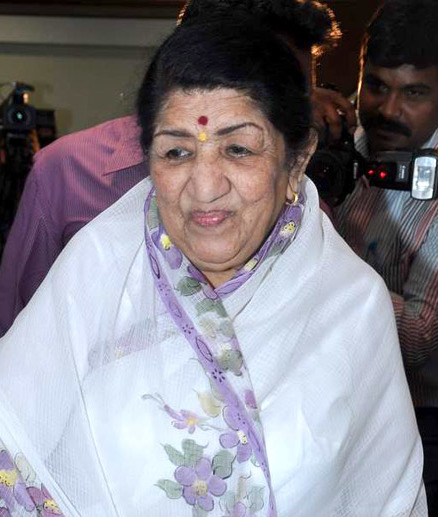
- Lata Mangeshkar in 2013
Awards and nominations
Award	Wins	Nominations
Filmfare Awards	7	22
National Film Awards	4	4
Bengal Film Journalists' Association Awards	14	14
Maharashtra State Film Awards	5	5
IIFA	2	2
Screen Awards	2	2
Zee Cine	1	3
Mirchi Music	1	1

Totals (Note: Certain award groups do not simply award one winner. They acknowledge several different recipients, have runners-up, and have third place. Since this is a specific recognition and is different from losing an award, runner-up mentions are considered wins in this award tally. For simplification and to avoid errors, each award in this list has been presumed to have had a prior nomination.)
- Wins: 82
- Nominations: 99

Lata Mangeshkar (born as Hema Mangeshkar; 28 September 1929 – 6 February 2022) was an Indian playback singer, music director and music producer who made Bollywood music. This is a list of awards and nominations received by Mangeshkar in her such long career.

== Government of India Honours and Awards ==
- 1969 - Padma Bhushan
- 1989 - Dadasaheb Phalke Award
- 1999 - Padma Vibhushan
- 2001 - Bharat Ratna
- 2008 - "One Time Award for Lifetime Achievement" honour to commemorate the 60th anniversary of India's Independence

== Maharashtra State Film Awards ==
- 1966 - Best Playback Singer for the songs of the film Sadhi Mansa
- 1966 - Best Music Director for Sadhi Mansa (Marathi) under the name 'Anandghan'
- 1977 - Best Playback Singer for Jait Re Jait
- 1997 - Maharashtra Bhushan Award
- 2001 - Maharashtra Ratna (First Recipient)

== National Film Awards ==
Lata Mangeshkar holds the record of being the oldest winner at the age of 61 of this award. She received her recent award in this category for the songs of film Lekin.... The jury presented her this award "for singing with outstanding expressions with the rarest and purest of styles."

- 1972 - Best Female Playback Singer for songs of the film Parichay
- 1974 - Best Female Playback Singer for songs of the film Kora Kagaz
- 1990 - Best Female Playback Singer for songs of the film Lekin...

== Filmfare Awards ==
The Filmfare Awards for playback singing first started in 1959. In 1956, the song "Rasik Balma" from the film Chori Chori by Shankar-Jaikishan won the Best Song Filmfare Award. Lata refused to sing it live in protest of absence of a Playback Singer category. The category was finally introduced in 1959. Though, separate awards for male & female singers were introduced later on. Lata Mangeshkar monopolized the best female playback singer award from 1959 to 1967. In 1970, Lata made the unusual gesture of giving up Filmfare awards in order to promote fresh talent.

- 1959 - "Aaja Re Pardesi" from Madhumati
- 1963 - "Kahi Deep Jale Kahi Dil" from Bees Saal Baad
- 1966 - "Tumhi Mere Mandir Tumhi Meri Pooja" from Khandan
- 1970 - "Aap Mujhe Achhe Lagne Lage" from Jeene Ki Raah
- 1993 - Filmfare Lifetime Achievement Award
- 1994 - Filmfare Special Award for "Didi Tera Devar Deewana" from Hum Aapke Hain Koun..!
- 2004 - Filmfare Special Award where a golden trophy was presented on the occasion of Filmfare Awards completing 50 years

== Bengal Film Journalists' Association Awards ==
All Best Female Playback Singer

- 1964 - for Woh Kaun Thi?
- 1967 - for Milan
- 1968 - for Raja Aur Runk
- 1969 - for Saraswatichandra
- 1970 - for Do Raaste
- 1971 - for Tere Mere Sapne
- 1972 - for Pakeezah
- 1973 - for Bon Palashir Padabali (Bengali film)
- 1973 - for Abhimaan
- 1975 - for Kora Kagaz
- 1981 - for Ek Duuje Ke Liye
- 1983 - for A Portrait Of Lataji
- 1985 - for Ram Teri Ganga Maili
- 1987 - for Amarsangee (Bengali film)
- 1991 - for Lekin...

== Doctor of Letters ==
- Maharaja Sayajirao University of Baroda (2005)
- Shivaji University, Kolhapur, India
- Pune University, India
- Indira Kala Sangeet Vishwavidyalaya, Khairagarh, India
- Fellow at Sangeet Natak Akademi in 1989
- Hyderabad University, India
- York University (1995)
- Baroda University

== Other awards and honours ==
- 1974 - Recorded in the Guinness Book of World Records for having sung the maximum number of songs in the world
- 1980 - Presented key of the city of Georgetown, Guyana
- 1980 - Honorary Citizenship of the Republic of Surinam
- 1985 - 9 June, declared as Asia Day in honour of her arrival in Toronto, Ontario, Canada
- 1987 - Honorary Citizenship of United States in Houston, Texas
- 1990 - Raja-Lakshmi Award by Sri Raja-Lakshmi Foundation, Chennai
- 1996 - Screen Award for Best Female Playback Singer for Hum Aapke Hain Koun..!
- 1996 - Rajiv Gandhi National Sadbhavana Award
- 1996 - Star Screen Lifetime Achievement Award
- 1997 - Rajiv Gandhi Award
- 1998 - Lifetime Achievement Award by the South Indian Educational Society
- 1999 - NTR National Award
- 1999 - Zee Cine Award for Lifetime Achievement
- 1999 - Zee Cine Award for Best Female Playback Singer for "Dil To Pagal Hai"
- 2000 - IIFA Lifetime Achievement Award
- 2000 - Jeevan Gaurav Puraskar by the Chaturang Pratishthan
- 2001 - Best Playback Singer of the Millennium (Female) by Hero Honda and file magazine "Stardust"
- 2001 - Noor Jehan Award (First Recipient)
- 2002 - Sahyadri Navratna Award for 'Swar Ratna' of the year.
- 2002 - Felicitation By CII (For Contribution to Music & the Film Industry)
- 2002 - Hakim Khan Sur Award (For National Integration by Maharana Mewar Foundation)
- 2002 - Asha Bhosle Award (First Recipient)
- 2003 - Inspiration / Special Award by MTV Immies
- 2004 - Living Legend Award by the Federation of Indian Chamber of Commerce and Industry (FICCI).
- 2005 - Legend Honour by Sahara One Sangeet Awards
- 2006 - Life Achievement Award by Merrill Lynch investment managers and Adora (India's second largest diamond exporter)
- 2007 - Forever Indian Award
- 2007 - Uttam Vaggayekar Jialal Vasant Award
- 2009 - ANR National Award
- 2010 - Knight of the Legion of Honour (French highest civilian award)
- 2010 - "Pride of India - Kala Saraswathi" Music Award.
- 2010 - Bhojpuri Film Award for Best Female Playback Singer for Umaria Kaili Tohre Naam
- 2010 - Big Marathi Music Award for Lifetime Achievement (Best Playback Singer)
- 2010 - GIMA Award for Lifetime Achievement.
- 2010 - GIMA Award for Best Devotional Album for "Shree Hanuman Chalisa".
- 2011 - Swarbhaskar Awards by Pune Municipal Corporation (First Recipient)
- 2011 - Sri Chanrasekarendra Saraswathi National Eminence Award.
- 2011 - Swaralaya Yesudas Legendary Award
- 2011 - Pazhassi Raja award 2011's Sangeetha Ratna Award
- 2018 - Swara Mauli award, Swara Mauli title by spiritual guru Vidya Narsimha Bharati Swami
- 2020 - Only Singer Ranked all-India 23rd in TRA's Most Desired Personality list 2020
- 2023 - Rolling Stone magazine's list of "The 200 Greatest Singers of All Time" placed her at number 84.

Year unknown

- "Avadh Samman" by the Government of Uttar Pradesh.
- "Swar Bharati" award given by Shankaracharya of Sankeshwar
- The only Asian to have received the Platinum Disc of EMI London
- Conferred the title of Asthaan Sangeet Vidwaan Sarloo ("Court Musician of the Shrine"), Tirupathi.
- Member of the Rajya Sabha
