= Filmfare Lifetime Achievement Award =

Annual award for careers in Hindi film

Filmfare Award for Lifetime Achievement
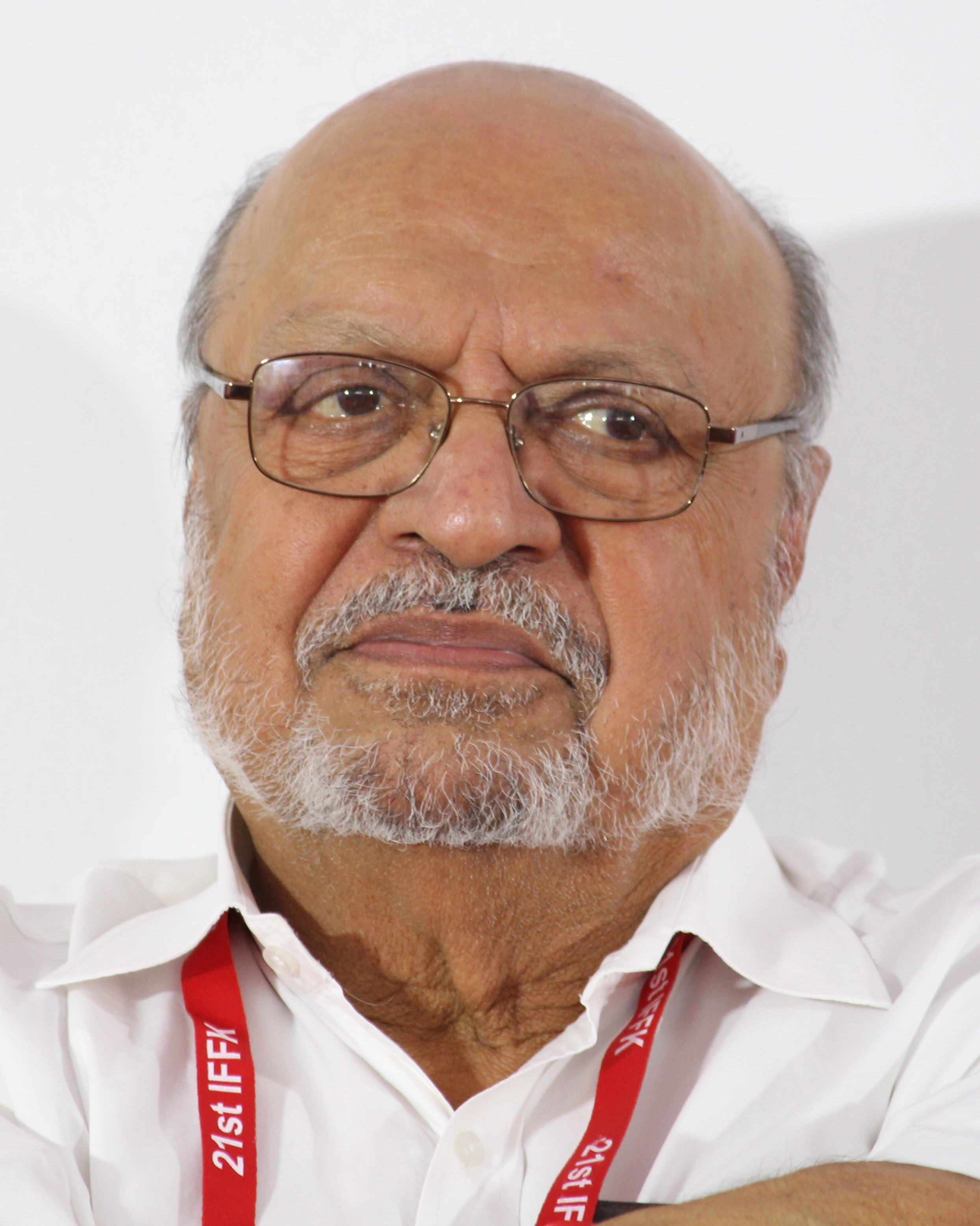
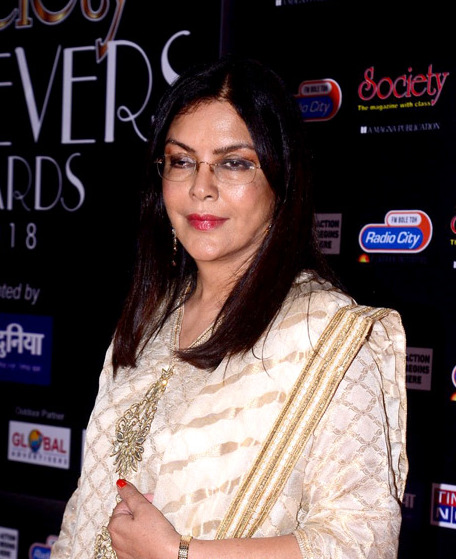
- The 2025 recipients: Shyam Benegal and Zeenat Aman
- Awarded for: Commemorating an artist's career
- Country: India
- Presented by: Filmfare
- First award: Amitabh Bachchan (1991)
- Currently held by: Shyam Benegal and Zeenat Aman (2025)
- Website: Filmfare winners

The Filmfare Lifetime Achievement Award, initially named Raj Kapoor Award for Lifetime Achievement after Raj Kapoor, is given by India's Filmfare magazine as part of its annual Filmfare Awards for Hindi films.

== List of recipients ==
† - Indicates the person also won the Dadasaheb Phalke Award

Year	Image	Honorees	Nature of work	Age when awarded (in years)
1991		Amitabh Bachchan †	Actor	48
1992	No award			
1993		Dev Anand †	Actor	69
1994		Dilip Kumar †	Actor	71
1994		Lata Mangeshkar †	Singer	64
1995		Waheeda Rehman †	Actress	57
1995		Shammi Kapoor	Actor	63
1996		Ashok Kumar †	Actor	84
1996		Vyjayantimala	Actress	62
1996		Sunil Dutt	Actor	66
1997		Dharmendra	Actor	61
1997		Mumtaz	Actress	49
1998		Sharmila Tagore	Actress	53
1999		Helen	Actress	60
1999		Manoj Kumar †	Actor	61
2000		Hema Malini	Actress	51
2000		Vinod Khanna †	Actor	53
2001		Feroz Khan	Actor	65
2001		Asha Bhosle †	Singer	67
2002		Gulzar †	Screenwriter / Lyricist	67
2002		Asha Parekh †	Actress	59
2003		Jeetendra	Actor	61
2003		Rekha	Actress	48
2004		Sulochana Latkar	Actress	75
2004		B. R. Chopra †	Director	89
2004		Nirupa Roy	Actress	73
2005		Rajesh Khanna	Actor	62
2006		Shabana Azmi	Actress	55
2007		Jaya Bachchan	Actress	58
2007		Javed Akhtar	Screenwriter / Lyricist	62
2008		Rishi Kapoor	Actor	55
2009		Om Puri	Actor	58
2009		Bhanu Athaiya	Costume Designer	79
2010		Shashi Kapoor †	Actor	71
2010		Khayyam	Music Director	83
2011		Manna Dey †	Singer	91
2012		Aruna Irani	Actress	65
2013		Yash Chopra † (posthumous)	Director	80
2014		Tanuja	Actress	70
2015		Kamini Kaushal	Actress	88
2016		Moushumi Chatterjee	Actress	61
2017		Shatrughan Sinha	Actor	71
2018		Bappi Lahiri	Music director	65
2018		Mala Sinha	Actress	81
2019		Sridevi (posthumous)	Actress	54
2020		Ramesh Sippy	Director	73
2021		Irrfan Khan (posthumous)	Actor	53
2022		Subhash Ghai	Director	77
2023		Prem Chopra	Actor	87
2024		David Dhawan	Director	72
2025		Shyam Benegal † (posthumous)	Director	90
2025		Zeenat Aman	Actress	73

== Superlatives ==
- In 58th Filmfare Awards, Yash Chopra became the first artist to become a posthumous winner.
- Oldest Winner – Manna Dey in 56th Filmfare Awards (aged 91)
- Youngest Winner – Amitabh Bachchan in 36th Filmfare Awards & Rekha in 48th Filmfare Awards (both aged 48)
- Number of Female recipients – 22
- Number of Male recipients – 29

== See also ==
- Filmfare Awards
- Bollywood
- Cinema of India
- Filmi music
