= Gomantak Maratha Samaj =

Caste of Goa

Regions with significant populations
- Primary populations in: Goa, Maharashtra, Karnataka & Deccan; Diaspora populations in: Anglosphere

Languages
- Konkani, Marathi, Kannada & others

Religion
- Hinduism

Gomantak Maratha Samaj is a Hindu community found in the Indian state of Goa. They are known as Nutan Maratha Samaj in the Sindhudurg district of Maharashtra and Naik Maratha Samaj in Maharashtra, Uttara Kannada district of Karnataka, also Telangana respectively.

== Origin ==
Gomantak Maratha is a relatively new ameliorative name. adopted by a community of traditional Hindu temple servants. They were previously known by the following names:

=== Kalavantin/ Kulambini ===
- Those who participated in music or singing and Dancing were known as ‘Kalavantini’ and Kalavant , literally meaning an artiste, they enjoyed a high status in the community. They were beauties with high Intelligence with vast knowledge of Hinduism, traditional puranic stories, honesty, and high devotion. Earlier they meant to remain celibate and provide music and dance for their Deity. They used to sing and dance in front of palanquin too during ritual ceremonies of their temple.

The Kalavant women (sometimes called as Narikin) as a custom became mistresses of Brahmin men who paid a huge sum of money to her mother.According to B.D. Satoskar They did not practice Prostitution, rather they chose monogamy. It were the Bhavin who did so and was thus called "Naikinn".

=== Chedvaan, Chede, Bandi, Farjand ===
They were not always connected to the temple but with the Brahmin landlords (Bhatkars), at whose residences they performed all types of household work.

The Gomantak Maratha Samaj is formed by combining the three Main sub - groups and Minor group Perni given above. Gomantak is not to be taken in the regional sense of the word or place, but in the sense of a native adjective. It means that Gomantak Maratha is not some Maratha caste of Gomantak, but it is to be taken to mean that this caste is having origin of the community which is in Goa, under the people's living there. As the old vast Gomantak extended from Kankavali to Gangavali, all the three sub - Groups of Above Mentioned were spread in this ancient Gomantak.

== History ==
The Devdasi system of temple servants had been prevalent in Goa since times immemorial. The Kalawantin community finds references throughout Goan history. From ancient times, Hindu upper-caste widows originally sought shelter in the temples if they did not commit Sati after the husband's death. These widows would then become the mistresses of the Brahmins. Any resulting daughters from the relationship would either be sold by their mothers to become mistresses of Brahmins or become temple servants and entertainers. The sons would also become temple servants and musicians.

The Portuguese called them bailadeiras (dancers). In 1598, the Viceroy Francisco da Gama passed a law on behalf of King Philip I of Portugal that prohibited members of the community from entering the Velhas Conquistas on the grounds that the community members "perform many obscene dances, sing dirty songs and do all sorts of things that only reflect a diabolic state."

During British colonial rule, many Kalawantin community members moved for economic reasons to the city of Bombay and other areas of British India. Most of these emigrants followed Hindustani classical music gharanas to improve their art and talent. Those who remained in Goa began organizing themselves after the Portuguese First Republic period. In 1910, Rajaram Painginkar started Kalawantin Movement from Poinguinim village in Goa. In 1917, Maratha Gayan Samaj (Maratha Singers Society) was formed in Kakode. In 1925, the Gomantak Maratha Samaj (G.M.S.) was formed under the leadership of Panginkar.

Following the Annexation of Goa, the G.M.S. was formally included by the Government of Goa as an Other Backward class.

== Notable members ==
- Mangeshkar Family
- Kishori Amonkar
- Dayanand Bandodkar
- Shashikala Kakodkar
- Kesarbai Kerkar
- Moghubai Kurdikar
- Anjanibai Malpekar
- Raghunath Mashelkar
- Rattan Bai Wairikar
- Vithal Nagesh Shirodkar

== See also ==
- Konkani people
- Devadasis
- Harijans
