= Geet Ramayan =

1950s Marathi radio programme

- Geet Ramayan Book Cover. The book compiles narration and lyrics of all the songs from the radio program.
- Genre: Indian music
- Running time: 15 minutes
- Country of origin: India
- Language: Marathi
- Home station: All India Radio, Pune
- Created by: G. D. Madgulkar (Author); Sudhir Phadke (Music)
- Written by: G. D. Madgulkar
- Executive producer: Sitakant Lad
- Narrated by: Sudhir Phadke
- Recording studio: Pune
- Original release: 1 April 1955 – 19 April 1956
- No. of episodes: 56

Geet Ramayan (Marathi: गीत रामायण, English: The Ramayana in Songs) is a collection of 56 Marathi language songs chronologically describing events from the Indian Hindu epic, the Ramayana. It was broadcast by All India Radio, Pune in 1955–1956, four years before television was introduced in India. Written by G. D. Madgulkar and the songs being composed by Sudhir Phadke, Geet Ramayan was acclaimed for its lyrics, music and singing. It is considered a "milestone of Marathi light music" and the "most popular" Marathi version of Ramayana.

The team of Madgulkar and Phadke presented a new song every week for a year with every song being aired first on a Friday morning and then again on Saturday and Sunday morning, between 8:45 AM and 9:00 AM IST. The program's first song "Kuśa Lava Rāmāyaṇ Gātī" was aired on 1 April 1955. Though Geet Ramayan is based on sage Valmiki's epic Ramayana, Madgulkar chose a different narrative format and was praised for the lyrics, and was called Ādhunik Valmiki (the modern Valmiki). The Geet Ramayan is considered as "the crescendo of Madgulkar's literary vigour". Phadke mainly used ragas of Hindustani classical music to compose the songs. He also selected the raga and the Tāla of a song to suit the time of the incident and the narrative mood. The poet and composer were praised for their contribution to the series.

The series showcased a total of 32 various characters from Ramayana. Rama (avatar of Vishnu and hero of the Ramayana) being the lead character of the series was given maximum number of songs (10), followed by eight songs for Sita (Rama's wife and avatar of the Hindu goddess Lakshmi). Madgulkar expressed their various moods, ranging from their divinity to the human weaknesses. Incidentally, the central antagonist of the Ramayana and Geet Ramayan, the demon-king Ravana, was not given any song. The series is narrated by Kusha and Lava, twin sons of Rama and Sita, and the writer of Ramayana (Valmiki) was also given one song in the series.

With increasing popularity since its release, Geet Ramayan has been translated into nine other languages: five Hindi translations and one each in Bengali, English, Gujarati, Kannada, Konkani, Sanskrit, Sindhi and Telugu. It has also been transliterated into Braille.

== Concept ==
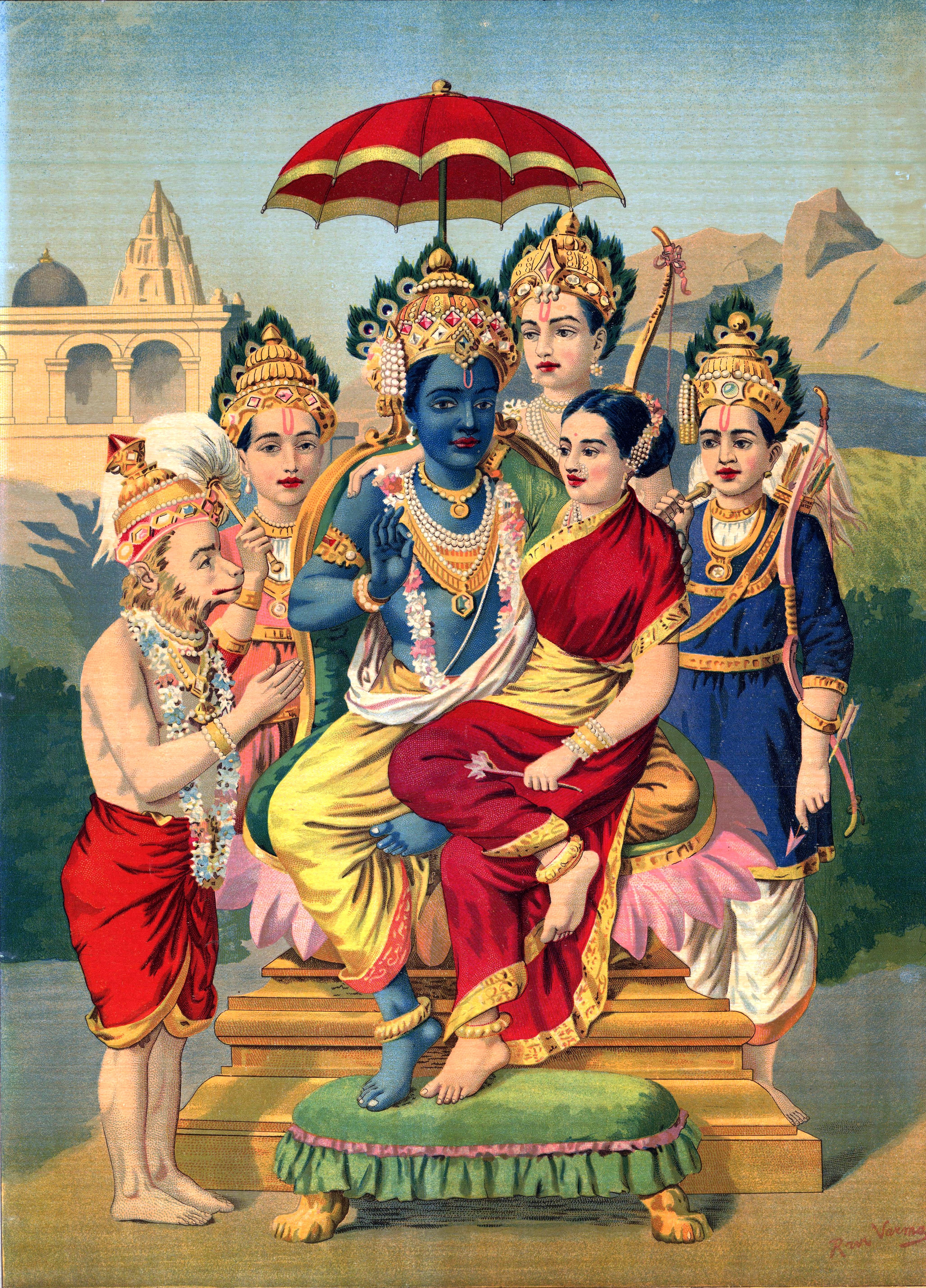
The central figures of the Ramayana: Rama, his wife Sita, the devotee Hanuman and Rama's three brothers (Lakshmana, Bharata and Shatrughna)

Geet Ramayan was conceptualized in 1955, four years before the introduction of television in India in 1959. During the early days of All India Radio, Pune (also known as Aakashwani Pune), station director Sitakant Lad wanted to begin a radio programme which would be entertaining and provide moral education. He hence outlined his plan to poet and writer G. D. Madgulkar (popularly known as "Ga-Di-Ma"). Since the Ramayana (written by Valmiki) is an Indian epic, Lad and Madgulkar came up with an idea of a version in singable verse. Madgulkar accepted the challenge, enlisting his Music Director friend Sudhir Phadke (popularly known as "Babuji") for the collaboration.

The team of Madgulkar and Phadke would present a new song every week for a year. Every song would be aired first on a Friday morning and then again on Saturday and Sunday morning, between 8:45 am and 9:00am IST. The programme was initially planned for a year (with 52 songs) with the concluding song Trīvār Jayajayakār Rāmā where Rama becomes the King, but 1955 in the Hindu calendar had an extra month (Adhikmās); therefore, four songs were added to extend the series to a total of fifty-six. The series ended with the song "Gā Bāḷāno, Shrīrāmāyaṇ" where the part post crown ceremony was added. Apart from the number of songs, Madgulkar and Phadke left music, lyrics and choice of singers ad libitum. Madgulkar was given artistic liberty for the choice of the meters for the song, execution of the story line, and the message he could convey through it.

Initially, the programme was scheduled to begin on the occasion of Gudi Padwa, beginning of the New year according to the lunisolar Hindu calendar but later finalized to be Rama Navami, traditional birthday of Rama. The program's first song "Kuśa Lava Rāmāyaṇ Gātī" was aired on 1 April 1955 at 8:45 am IST. Vidya Madgulkar, the poet's wife, recalled in an interview that Madgulkar wrote the first song and gave it to Phadke the day before the recording; however, Phadke lost the lyrics. With the broadcast already scheduled, station director Sitakant Lad requested Madgulkar to re-write the song which was readily declined by an angered poet. Lad then decided to lock the poet in one of recording rooms equipped with all the required writing material and agreed to unlock the door only when Madgulkar is ready with the lyrics. Madgulkar then rewrote the lyrics from memory in fifteen minutes so Phadke could compose the music.

== Lyrics ==
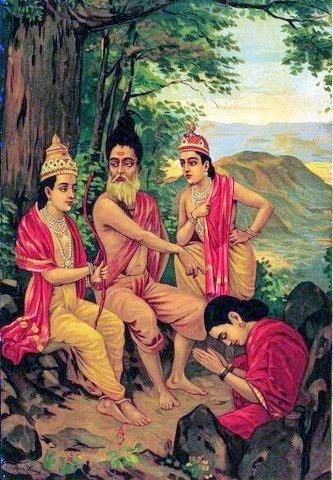
The Geet Ramayan included themes like liberation of Ahalya by Rama, which conveyed religious devotion. (Early-20th-century print by Ravi Varma Press)

Though Valmiki was the main inspiration for the Geet Ramayan, Madgulkar chose a different narrative format. He used a simple lyrical format with a flexible number of stanzas (from five to eleven stanzas, with three or four lines of varying length). The metre used was similar to Bhavageete, with roughly the same number of mātrās in each line. The metre was also suited to the narration and the characters who sang the song. Madgulkar used various formats, including narrative, descriptive and communal songs. He was praised for his lyrics, and was called "Ādhunik Valmiki" (the modern Valmiki); and the Geet Ramayan is considered "the crescendo of Madgulkar's literary vigour".

Madgulkar's narrative format was different from that of Valmiki's where he did not end the series with the coronation of Rama and Sita, but included Sita's abandonment by Rama, and her giving birth to the twins, Lava and Kusha. However, he chose not to include the last episode of Sita's final confrontation in Rama's court and her entering the earth. Madgulkar ended the series with the song "Gā Bāḷāno, Shrīrāmāyaṇ" which was voiced by Valmiki where he tells his disciples, Lava and Kusha, how they should recite the Ramayana in front of Rama. Evidently, this also completes the cycle of songs where it had begun, with Lava and Kusha singing in Rama's court.

Madgulkar did not make any attempt to provide new interpretation or meaning to the Ramayana but told the same story in the simpler and poetic format. With inclusion of characters like Ahalya and Shabari, he included the sentiments of religious devotion (Bhakti) and also gave divine touch to the story while describing the marriage of Sita and Rama as a union of Maya and Brahman. He composed songs on all seven chapters or Kāṇḍa of Ramayana. Out of 56 songs, poet composed twelve songs on Balakanda, seven on Ayodhya Kanda, fourteen on Aranya Kanda, three on Kishkindha Kanda, four on Sundara Kanda, twelve on Yuddha Kanda and three on Uttara Kanda.

As the series became popular, the daily newspapers in Pune began to print the text of the new song every week after its first airing. The first official edition of the text of these fifty-six poems and their prose narrations came out on the occasion of Vijayadashami, 3 October 1957, published for Akashwani by the director of the Publications Division, Delhi, in pocketbook size.

== Music and singing ==
Musical director Sudhir Phadke composed the songs based on the ragas of Hindustani classical music, including Bhopali, Bhimpalasi and Madhuvanti. The raga and Tāla of a song was selected to suit the time of the incident and the narrative mood. For example, the song "Calā Rāghavā Calā" is composed as a Bibhas (morning) raga, and the song describes an event taking place in the morning. The songs "Āj Mī Śāpmucta Jāhale" and "Yāckā, Thāmbu Nako Dārāta" are not based on a specific raga, but include several ragas in each song.

The singers, which included Vasantrao Deshpande, Manik Varma, Suresh Haldankar, Ram Phatak and Lata Mangeshkar, were familiar with the vocal style of Indian classical music. Phadke voiced all the songs for Rama, and well-known Kirana gharana singer Manik Varma voiced the character of Sita. Lata Mangeshkar sang one song for Sita, "Maj Sāng Lakṣmaṇā", in which Sita questions Rama about her abandonment but her question remains unanswered.

== Characters ==
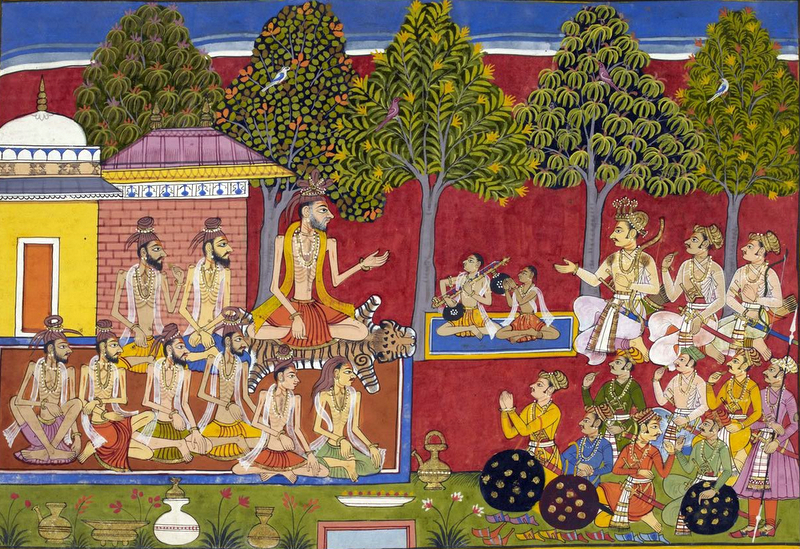
17th-century painting of Kusha and Lava singing the Ramayana at Valmiki's hermitage

A total of 32 characters from the Ramayana were voiced in the Geet Ramayan. Madgulkar expressed the emotions of characters such as Rama, Sita, Hanuman – the monkey (vanara) god and devotee of Rama – and Lakshmana (Rama's brother); he also attempted to give voice to the humblest characters in the epic. The vanara are given a song ("Setū Bāndhā Re Sāgarī") describing a bridge forming over the ocean so Rama and his army could cross to Lanka. The poet noted that the song described the sacrifice of joint labour and was an example of the principle, "Union is strength". Nishadraj Guha (King of Kevati, kingdom located by the banks of Ganges river) and the boatmen who helped Rama in crossing the Ganges river expressed themselves in "Nakos Nauke Parat Phirū". The author of the Ramayana, Valmiki, was also given a song (the final song, "Gā Bāḷāno, Shrīrāmāyaṇ") with his advice to Rama's sons Kusha and Lava before they appear before Rama.

Being hero of the Ramayana and Geet Ramayan, Madgulkar expressed the varied moods of Rama; he was the most-voiced character in the Geet Ramayan with ten songs, followed by Sita with eight. He portrayed Rama as a complex character full of emotions and passions, with some of the questionable deeds, yet bound by a traditional virtue and the sanctity of a promise. Madgulkar voiced Rama's personal ethical dilemmas (in "Vālīvadh Nā, Khalnidrālan" and "Līnate, Cārūte, Sīte") along with his courage (in "Nabhā Bhedunī Nād Chālale"), and steadfastness (in "Līnate, Cārūte, Sīte"). He was shown to be patient with his brothers and mothers (in "Parādhīn Āhe Jagatī Putra Mānavāchā"), obedient of father and sages (in "Calā Rāghavā Calā"), heroic on the battlefield, and diplomatic when dealing with the monkey king, Vali (in "Vālīvadh Nā, Khalnidrālan"). Madgulkar is said to have successfully shown Rama's divinity alongside his human weaknesses. He was shown to be distracted at the loss Sita (in "Koṭhe Sītā Janakanandinī?"), and wailed in Lakshmana's presence (in "Hī Ticyā Veṇitil Phule"). In another situation, he uttered some heart-wrenching words to Sita, in front of his army with blaming her for all the happenings (in "Līnate, Cārūte, Sīte"), and then he was also shown to explain his behavior with oaths and confessions of loyalty to Sita (in "Lokasākṣa Shuddhī Jhālī").

Rama's mother, Kausalya, sang three songs; his brother Bharata, his father Dasharatha, Hanuman, Lakshmana, the demon Surpanakha (sister of Ravana), Rama's guru-sage Vishvamitra and Kusha-Lava have two songs each. The central antagonist of the Ramayana, the demon-king Ravana, was not given a song; his oppressive presence was expressed in prose narration, poetic descriptions and songs sung by the other characters (such as Ravana's demon brother Kumbhakarna in "Lankevar Kāḷ Kaṭhin ālā").

== List of songs ==
List of songs (number, title, singer(s), raga, taal, air date, character(s) and length)
No	Title	Singer(s)	Raga	Taal	Aired On	Character(s)	Length	Ref
1	"Kuśa Lava Rāmāyaṇ Gātī" "कुश लव रामायण गाती" Description: The narrator describes the scene where Kusha and Lava (Rama's sons) begin singing the Ramayan taught to them by their guru, Valmiki. They sing before Rama on the occasion of Ashwamedh Yagna, unaware of the relationship between them.	Sudhir Phadke	Bhopali	Bhajani	1 April 1955	Narrator	10:11	
2	"Sarayū Tīrāvarī Ayodhyā" "सरयू तीरावरी अयोध्या" Description: Kusha and Lava describe the pleasant life and the people of Ayodhya; however, the childless King Dasharatha and his three wives; Kausalya, Sumitra, Kaikeyi; are unhappy.	• Mandakini Pandey • Pramodini Desai	Mishra Deskar	Bhajani	8 April 1955	• Kusha • Lava	9:41	
3	"Ugā Kā Kālij Mājhe Ule?" "उगा कां काळिज माझें उले?" Description: Kausalya, the eldest wife of Dasharatha, laments that they have not been blessed with any offspring.	Lalita Phadke	Mishra Kafi	Keherwa	15 April 1955	Kausalya	9:15	
4	"Udās Kā Tū?" "उदास कां तूं?" Description: Dasharatha consoles Kausalya, telling her they will perform the Ashwamedh Yagna and give gifts to please Agni dev. He hears a voice, telling him that he will beget four children.	Baban Navdikar	Desh	Bhajani	22 April 1955	Dasharatha	8:23	
5	"Daśarathā, Ghe He Pāyasadān" "दशरथा, घे हें पायसदान" Description: Pleased by Dasharatha's devotion, Agni dev appears with the prasad sent by Vishnu and says that the children conceived by the queens after consuming the prasad will be great warriors.	Sudhir Phadke	Bhimpalasi	Bhajani	29 April 1955	Agni	7:11	
6	"Rām Janmalā Ga Sakhī" "राम जन्मला ग सखी" Description: Dasharatha and his queens are blessed with four sons, and Ayodhya celebrates joyously.	• Suman Mate • Janki Iyer • Kalindi Keskar	Mishra Mand	Dadra	6 May 1955	Chorus	10:22	
7	"Sāvaḷā Ga Rāmcandra" "सांवळा ग रामचंद्र" Description: Kausalya sings happily to the other queens, describing how Rama is growing up.	Lalita Phadke	Mishra Pilu	Keherwa	13 May 1955	Kausalya	8:06	
8	"Jyeṣṭha Tujhā Putra Malā" "ज्येष्ठ तुझा पुत्र मला देइ दशरथा" Description: Rama and his brothers grow, studying a number of texts and becoming expert in warrior skills. Sage Vishvamitra asks Dasharatha to take Rama with him to protect the sacred yagnas, which were disrupted by demons.	Ram Phatak	Puriya Dhanashree	Ektal	20 May 1955	Vishvamitra	7:36	
9	"Mār Hī Trātikā Rāmcandrā" "मार ही त्राटिका, रामचंद्रा" Description: On their way, Vishvamitra teaches and tells stories to Rama and Lakshmana until they are attacked by a demon named Tratika and her sons, Subahu and Maricha. Vishvamitra describes the evil she brings, and orders Rama to kill her.	Ram Phatak	Shankara	Jhaptal	27 May 1955	Vishvamitra	5:26	
10	"Calā Rāghavā Calā" "चला राघवा चला" Description: Killing Tratika and Subahu and chasing the demon Maricha, Rama's valour impresses everyone. The King of Mithila, Janaka, is preparing for a yagna and the rishis ask Rama to come along.	Chandrakant Gokhale	Bibhas	Bhajani	3 June 1955	Rishi	8:22	
11	"Āj Mī Śāpmucta Jāhale" † "आज मी शापमुक्त जाहलें" Description: On their way to Mithila Rama finds an old, abandoned place where Vishvamitra tells him the story of Ahalya, wife of the sage Gautama Maharishi, and asks him to end her curse.	Malati Pandey	—	Keherwa	10 June 1955	Ahalya	6:43	
12	"Svayamvar Jhāle Sītece" "स्वयंवर झालें सीतेचे" Description: At Mithila, Rama wins the swayamvara and marries Janaka's daughter Sita.	Sudhir Phadke	Mishra Mand	Keherwa	17 June 1955	Charan	8:57	
13	"Vhāyace Rām Āyodhyāpati" "व्हायचे राम आयोध्यापति" Description: Seeing Rama content in married life and his affairs, Dasharatha decides to crown him as the next King of Ayodhya. Sita's sisters sing, announcing the news to Sita.	• Suman Mate • Usha Atre • Janaki Iyer • Yogini Joglekar • Mrs. Jog	Mishra Kafi	Keherwa	24 June 1955	• Urmila • Mandavi • Shrutakirti • Chorus	8:07	
14	"Modu Nakā Vacanās" "मोडुं नका वचनास" Description: Afraid that her son Bharata would become hapless if Rama becomes King, Kaikeyi asks Dasharatha to exile Rama and crown Bharata instead.	Kumidini Pednekar	Bihag	Tintal	1 July 1955	Kaikeyi	8:03	
15	"Nako Re Jāu Rāmarāyā" "नको रे जाउं रामराया" Description: Rama agrees to leave the kingdom, but Kausalya sadly pleads with him to stay.	Lalita Phadke	Mishra Bhairavi	Keherwa	8 July 1955	Kausalya	8:22	
16	"Rāmāviṇ Rājyapadī Koṇ Baisato?" "रामाविण राज्यपदीं कोण बैसतो?" Description: Lakshmana is furious, and questions the turn of events. He praises Rama as best to inherit the kingdom, and promises to see this done.	Suresh Haldankar	Mishra Bahar	Ektal	15 July 1955	Lakshmana	5:35	
17	"Jethe Rāghav Tethe Sītā" "जेथें राघव तेथें सीता" Description: Rama accepts Laxmana's request to accompany him, and asks his wife Sita for permission to leave. However, Sita has decided to follow her husband wherever he goes.	Manik Varma	Madhuvanti	Keherwa	22 July 1955	Sita	8:54	
18	"Thāmb Sumantā, Thāmbavi Re Rath" "थांब सुमंता, थांबवि रे रथ" Description: Seeing Rama leave Ayodhya with his wife and brother, the residents beg him to stay. They ask Sumanta, the minister of Ayodhya who is driving the chariot, to stop. They follow Rama to the Ganga River.	Chorus	Todi	Keherwa	29 July 1955	Chorus	10:05	
19	"Nakos Nauke Parat Phirū" "नकोस नौके परत फिरूं" Description: On the banks of the Ganga, Rama asks a boatman to take them across the river to continue their journey, and he complies.	Chorus	Mishra Dhun	Keherwa	5 August 1955	• Nishadraj Guha • Boatman	7:37	
20	"Yā Ithe, Lakṣmaṇā, Bāndh Kutī" "या इथें, लक्ष्मणा, बांध कुटी" Description: The trio reaches the Chitrakoot region. Praising the place, Rama asks Lakshmana for a building on the banks of the Mandakini River.	Sudhir Phadke	Mishra Khamaj	Keherwa	12 August 1955	Rama	8:49	
21	"Bolale Ituke Maj Shrīrām" "बोलले इतुके मज श्रीराम" Description: Sumanta returns to Ayodhya, and reports on Rama. He tells Kausalya and Sumitra not to worry about him, and to forgive Kaikeyi, and asks Bharata to rule the kingdom wisely.	Gajanan Watave	Jogkans	Keherwa	19 August 1955	Sumant	9:04	
22	"Dāṭalā Cohikade Andhār" "दाटला चोहिकडे अंधार" Description: Dasharatha is unable to bear the pain of Rama's exile, and remembers how Shravan's blind parents cursed him. Singing that he now sees only darkness everywhere, he dies.	Sudhir Phadke	Mishra Jogiya	Keherwa	26 August 1955	Dasharatha	9:18	
23	"Mātā Na Tū, Vairiṇī" "माता न तूं, वैरिणी" Description: Enraged, Bharata curses his mother Kaikeyi for causing Dashratha's death and sending Rama away. He decides to bring Rama back and make him the king.	Vasantrao Deshpande	Adana	Tintal	2 September 1955	Bharata	6:28	
24	"Cāpabāṇ Ghyā Karī" "चापबाण घ्या करीं" Description: Lakshmana notices a commotion, and discovers that Bharata is coming. He is angry and puzzled, wondering what more Bharata could now want from Rama.	Suresh Haldankar	Kedar	Ektal	9 September 1955	Lakshmana	6:39	
25	"Parādhīn Āhe Jagatī Putra Mānavāchā" "पराधीन आहे जगतीं पुत्र मानवाचा" Description: When Bharata finds Rama, Rama explains how humans are dependent on their fate; therefore, he should not feel sorry for him. He asks Bharata to return, rule Ayodhya and not look for Rama again until his exile ends.	Sudhir Phadke	Yaman Kalyan	Keherwa	16 September 1955	Rama	8:35	
26	"Tāt Gele, Māya Gelī" "तात गेले, माय गेली" Description: Bharata informs Rama of Dasharatha's death, pleading with him to return since he is incapable of ruling the kingdom. Rama refuses; Bharata requests his paduka as a sign of his blessings and leaves.	Vasantrao Deshpande	Puriya Dhanashree	Rupak	23 September 1955	Bharata	7:24	
27	"Koṇ Tū, Kuṭhalā Rājakumār?" "कोण तूं कुठला राजकुमार?" Description: While wandering in the forest, Ravana's sister Shurpanakha sees him. She asks to marry him; he politely refuses, since he is already married to Sita.	Malati Pandey	Mishra Kafi	Keherwa	30 September 1955	Surpanakha	7:22	
28	"Sūḍ Ghe Tyācā Lankāpati" "सूड घे त्याचा लंकापति" Description: Angry, Shurpanaka pleads with Ravana to avenge Lakshmana for cutting her nose. She praises Ravana, saying that he deserves to marry Sita, and asks him to solve the problems caused by the two brothers.	Yogini Joglekar	Mishra Hindol	Tintal	7 October 1955	Surpanakha	6:28	
29	"Maj Āṇun Dyā To" "मज आणुन द्या तो" Description: Ravana sends the demon Maricha, in the form of a golden deer. Sita is attracted by the bejewelled, sparkling deer, and sends Rama to fetch it.	Manik Varma	Mishra Kafi	Keherwa	14 October 1955	Sita	7:27	
30	"Yāckā, Thāmbu Nako Dārāta" † "याचका, थांबु नको दारात" Description: Seeing Rama and Lakshmana chasing the deer far away, Ravana comes to abduct Sita. Comparing him with Rama, Sita criticises his evil intentions and asks him to leave.	Manik Varma	—	Keherwa	21 October 1955	Sita	9:28	
31	"Koṭhe Sītā Janakanandinī?" "कोठें सीता जनकनंदिनी?" Description: Rama is unable to find Sita when he returns from the hunt. He laments his fate, and asks the surrounding trees where Sita is.	Sudhir Phadke	Mishra Jogiya	Keherwa	28 October 1955	Rama	9:46	
32	"Hī Ticyā Veṇitil Phule" "हीं तिच्या वेणिंतिल फुलें" Description: Searching for his wife, Rama finds her footprints and flowers she wore in her hair. He sees signs of a fight between two warriors, but is unable to figure out what happened.	Sudhir Phadke	Bhairavi	Keherwa	4 November 1955	Rama	9:22	
33	"Palavilī Rāvaṇe Sītā" "पळविली रावणें सीता" Description: Rama sees the injured Jatayu nearby. Jatayu tells him how he fought Ravana (and was fatally injured) while trying to rescue Sita. He then directs them towards Lanka, where Ravana flew away with Sita.	Ram Phatak	Maaru Bihag	Keherwa	11 November 1955	Jatayu	9:26	
34	"Dhanya Mī Śabarī Shrīrāmā" "धन्य मी शबरी श्रीरामा" Description: Rama meets Shabari on his way. She sings, pleased to see him, and offers him berries.	Malati Pandey	Shuddha Sarang	Bhajani	18 November 1955	Shabari	8:10	
35	"Sanmitra Rāghavānchā Sugrīv Aāj Jhālā" "सन्मित्र राघवांचा सुग्रीव आज झाला" Description: After meeting Rama, Sugriva (the vanara king of Kishkindha) tells the story of how his brother Vali took his wife Rumā and his kingdom. He pleads with Rama for help, and offers his vanara force to search for Sita. Rama decides to help him by killing Vali.	V. L. Inamdar	Brindabani Sarang	Ektal	25 November 1955	Sugriva	9:12	
36	"Vālīvadh Nā, Khalnidrālan" "वालीवध ना, खलनिर्दालन" Description: After shooting Vali with an arrow, Vali asks Rama why. Rama replies that Vali should have forgiven Sugriva, since a younger brother is like one's own son. Rama justifies his interference by saying that he has King Bharata's permission to punish evil. He justifies attacking the unarmed Sugriva by comparing him with a deer that is killed by a hunter without warning.	Sudhir Phadke	Kedar	Keherwa	1 December 1955	Rama	7:52	
37	"Asā Hā Ekaca Shrīhanumān" "असा हा एकच श्रीहनुमान्" Description: Jambavan praises Hanuman for his ability to fly across the sea and find Sita in Ravana's Lanka. He describes Hanuman's childhood attempt to swallow the sun, and encourages him to fly high.	Vasantrao Deshpande	Multani	Bhajani	8 December 1955	Jambavan	7:18	
38	"Hīca Tī Rāmāchī Swāminī" "हीच ती रामांची स्वामिनी" Description: Hanuman flies to Lanka in search of Sita. He finally finds her in a garden, weeping and waiting for her husband to rescue her from Ravana's confinement.	V. L. Inamdar	Tilang	Keherwa	15 December 1955	Hanuman	7:14	
39	"Nako Karūs Valganā" "नको करूंस वल्गना" Description: Sita tells Ravana to let her go to her husband, promising him that Rama would forgive all his sins; if he does not let her leave, he will be killed by the archer Rama.	Manik Varma	Shankara	Ektal	22 December 1955	Sita	7:29	
40	"Maj Sāng Avasthā Dūtā" "मज सांग अवस्था दूता" Description: When Hanuman sees Sita, he gives her Rama's ring. She asks about him, and about when her husband will kill the demon Ravana.	Manik Varma	Bhimpalasi	Keherwa	29 December 1955	Sita	10:19	
41	"Peṭavi Lankā Hanumant" "पेटवी लंका हनुमंत" Description: Lava and Kusha describe Hanuman setting fire to Lanka.	• Mandakini Pandey • Pramodini Joshi	Malkaush	Keherwa	5 January 1956	• Kusha • Lava	8:32	
42	"Setū Bāndhā Re Sāgarī" "सेतू बांधा रे सागरीं" Description: To reach the island of Lanka, the vanaras build a bridge. The bridge stones float on the water when they are inscribed, "Sri Rama".	Chorus	Mishra Dhun	Keherwa	12 January 1956	Vanaras	8:12	
43	"Raghuvarā, Bolat Kā Nāhī" "रघुवरा, बोलत कां नाहीं?" Description: Ravana, with Vidyujivha's help, fools Sita by showing her Rama's bow and his broken head. Sita is grief-stricken.	Manik Varma	Mishra Jogiya	Keherwa	19 January 1956	Sita	7:51	
44	"Sugrīvā He Sāhas Asale" "सुग्रीवा, हें साहस असलें" Description: After Sugriva attacks Ravana and loses the fight Rama scolds him for his impulsiveness, asking him to plan his attack next time.	Sudhir Phadke	Sampoorna Malkaush	Keherwa	26 January 1956	Rama	8:53	
45	"Rāvaṇās Sāng Angadā" "रावणास सांग अंगदा" Description: Rama sends Angada to Ravana with his message, suggesting that if Ravana gives Sita away war will be averted.	Sudhir Phadke	Sarang	Ektal	2 February 1956	Rama	8:17	
46	"Nabhā Bhedunī Nād Chālale" "नभा भेदुनी नाद चालले" Description: Kusha and Lava describe the pitched battle between the vanara and the rakshasa.	• Mandakini Pandey • Pramodini Joshi	Bhairavi	Keherwa	9 February 1956	• Kusha • Lava	8:26	
47	"Lankevar Kāḷ Kaṭhin" "लंकेवर काळ कठिण" Description: Seeing the poor condition of Lanka in the battle, Ravana wakes Kumbhakarana from his long sleep and he then enters the battlefield.	V. L. Inamdar	Hindol	Khemta	16 February 1956	Kumbhakarna	8:15	
48	"Āj Kā Niṣphaḷ Hotī Bāṇ" "आज कां निष्फळ होती बाण?" Description: Rama vainly tries many times to kill Ravana with his arrows. Helpless, he is unable to solve the mystery.	Sudhir Phadke	Mishra Asavari	Keherwa	23 February 1956	Rama	8:03	
49	"Bhūvarī Rāvaṇvadha Jhālā" "भूवरी रावणवध झाला" Description: After Vibhishan reveals Ravana's secret Rama shoots him in the navel, killing him. Joyous at the demon's death, Gandharvas and Apsaras sing praise to Rama.	Chorus	Maaru Bihag	Bhajani	1 March 1956	• Gandharva • Apsara	9:38	
50	"Līnate, Cārūte, Sīte" "लीनते, चारुते, सीते" Description: After the war ends, Rama frees Sita and they are reunited.	Sudhir Phadke	Yamani Bilaval	Keherwa	8 March 1956	Rama	8:36	
51	"Lokasākṣa Shuddhī Jhālī" "लोकसाक्ष शुद्धी झाली" Description: When people raise doubts about Sita's chastity, Sita proves herself in a trial by ordeal.	Sudhir Phadke	Shuddha Kalyan	Bhajani	15 March 1956	Rama	9:04	
52	"Trīvār Jayajayakār Rāmā" "त्रिवार जयजयकार, रामा" Description: Rama returns to Ayodhya in a pushpaka vimana, and the citizens celebrate his arrival.	Chorus	Bhairavi	Bhajani	22 March 1956	Chorus	8:50	
53	"Prabho, Maj Ekac Var Dyāvā" "प्रभो, मज एकच वर द्यावा" Description: Hanuman asks for Rama's blessing and a place near his feet, saying that he would always be devoted to him.	Ram Phatak	Mishra Pahadi	Bhajani	29 March 1956	Hanuman	6:41	
54	"Dohāḷe Puravā Raghukulatilakā" "डोहाळे पुरवा रघुकुलतिलका" Description: Sita announces her pregnancy to Rama, telling him how happy she is and about the many things she wishes to do.	Manik Varma	Mishra Pilu	Keherwa	5 April 1956	Sita	8:09	
55	"Maj Sāng Lakṣmaṇā" "मज सांग लक्ष्मणा" Description: When some citizens still question Sita's chastity, Rama abandons her. She pleads with her brother-in-law, Lakshmana, to help her.	Lata Mangeshkar	Mishra Jogiya	Keherwa	12 April 1956	Sita	9:48	
56	"Gā Bāḷāno, Shrīrāmāyaṇ" "गा बाळांनो, श्रीरामायण" Description: Sita takes shelter in the sage Valmiki's ashram, where she gives birth to twin sons: Kusha and Lava. Valmiki educates them, teaching them the Ramayan and asking them to spread the message.	Sudhir Phadke	Bhairavi	Bhajani	19 April 1956	Valmiki	8:09	
Total							7:35:42	
†	Independent composition							

== Performances ==
After Geet Ramayan's original broadcast was over in March of 1956, requests of re-broadcast were flooding the radio station. All-India Radio repeated the entire series of fifty-six weekly songs due to popular demand. After the broadcast, Phadke produced public concerts of selected songs. The first public performance was held in the Madgulkars' bungalow, "Panchavati" at Wakdewadi, Pune on 28 May 1958. In 1979, a Silver Jubilee celebration of the programme took place at the New English School in Pune for eight nights. Atal Bihari Vajpayee, the then Minister of External Affairs, attended the show as the guest of honour along with the then Deputy Prime Minister of India Yashwantrao Chavan, Bollywood film director Basu Bhattacharya, actor Dada Kondke, and celebrated classical singers such as Bhimsen Joshi and Kishori Amonkar. Vajpayee also attended the Golden Jubilee celebration with Sharad Pawar and Balasaheb Thackeray. National Award-winning art director Nitin Chandrakant Desai designed the stage depicting scenes from the Ramayana. The event featured all the songs from the original Geet Ramayan now vocalized by Madgulkar's son Anand Madgulkar, Shridhar Phadke, Suresh Wadkar, Upendra Bhat, Padmaja Phenany Joglekar and others.

== Reception ==
As the radio programme became popular, daily newspapers in Pune began printing the lyrics of the new songs each week. The publication department of All India Radio also compiled the lyrics and excerpts from the introductory comments in a book form. The 179-page volume, then priced at ₹ 2, was launched on 3 October 1957 on the occasion of Vijayadashami. In 1965, His Master's Voice released ten LPs featuring the voice of Sudhir Phadke. In 1968, the Gramophone Company of India released a 10-cassette set, again featuring Phadke's voice, and 50,000 records were sold. Madgulkar's son, Anand, produced a televised version showcasing twenty-eight episodes of the Geet Ramayan on Zee Marathi; however, it received a lukewarm response. He has also written a book, Geet Ramayanache Ramayan, describing the making of the radio programme. Live shows of Geet Ramayan are still produced on occasion of Rama Navami.

Geet Ramayan has been translated into nine other languages and also transliterated into Braille. The translations are:

Bengali

- By Kamala Bhagwat, a performer from Calcutta

English

- By Mr. Ursekar, a retired judge who used a Shakespearean style

Gujarati

- By Hansraj Thakkar of Mumbai; sung by Hansraj Thakkar and Kumud Bhagwat

Hindi

- By Rudradatta Mishra of Gwalior, and published by Nagesh Joshi; sung by Vasant Ajgaonkar
- By Hari Narayan Vyas; sung by Bal Gokhle
- By Kusum Tambe of Mandla, Madhya Pradesh
- By an unknown singer from Nagpur, Avadhi
- By Bal Gokhale of Baroda

Kannada

- By B. H. Tofakhane; sung by Upendra Bhat

Konkani

- By Mr. Kamath; sung by Upendra Bhat
- By B.V. Baliga

Sanskrit

- By Vasant Gadgil; sung by Malati Pande, Kamala Ketkar and Sanjay Upadhye
- By Sitaram Datar of Andheri, Thane sung by Milind Karmarkar, Madhuri Karmarkar and Sudha Datar

Sindhi

- By poet and singer Rita Shahani, who performed the songs as classical ragas. Also, choreographed and directed a dance-drama based on the book.

Telugu

- By Vanamamalai Varadacharya; sung by Dhondushastri and Shyamala Satyanarayan Rao

== See also ==
Ramavataram

== Bibliography ==
- Aklujkar, Vidyut (2004). "The "Radio-Active" Gīta-Rāmāyaṇa: Home and Abroad". In Mandakranta, Bose (ed.). The Rāmāyaṇa Revisited. Oxford University Press. ISBN 978-0-19-516832-7.
- Das, Sisir Kumar (1995). A History of Indian Literature 1911–1956:Struggle for Freedom: Triumph and Tragedy. Sahitya Akademi. ISBN 978-81-7201-798-9.
- Datta, Amaresh (1987). Encyclopaedia of Indian Literature: A-Devo. Sahitya Akademi. ISBN 978-81-260-1803-1.
- Datta, Amaresh (1988). Encyclopaedia of Indian Literature: Devraj to Jyoti. Sahitya Akademi. ISBN 978-81-260-1194-0.
- Godbole, Arun (2009). अजरामर 'गीत रामायण' [Immortal Geet Ramayan] (in Marathi). Kaushik Prakashan.
- Lal, Mohan (1992). Encyclopaedia of Indian Literature: Sasay to Zorgot. Vol. 5. Sahitya Akademi. ISBN 978-81-260-1221-3.
- Madgulkar, Anand (2004). 'गीत रामायणाचे' रामायण (in Marathi). Utkarsh Prakashan. ISBN 978-81-7425-342-2.
- Prabhavananda, Swami (1979). The Spiritual Heritage of India. Vedanta Press. ISBN 978-0-87481-035-6.
- Rao, B. S. S. (1992). Television For Rural Development. Concept Publishing Company. ISBN 978-81-7022-377-1.
- Thiel-Horstmann, Monika (1991). "Eknaths Treatment of the Ramayana as a Socio". Rāmayaṇa and Rāmāyaṇas. Otto Harrassowitz Verlag. ISBN 978-3-447-03116-5.
