= Girish =

Girish is a given name. Notable people with the name include:

- Girish Gangadharan, Indian cinematographer
- Gireesh Kumar Sanghi, Indian politician
- Gireesh Puthenchery, Malayalam lyricist
- Gireesh Sahedev, television actor
- Girish Agarwal, Indian physicist
- Girish Bihari, Indian educationist and IPS officer
- Girish Chandra, multiple people
- Girish Karnad, Kannada writer, actor
- Girish Kasaravalli, Kannada film director
- Girish Kohli, Indian author
- Girish Kumar, Bollywood film actor
- Girish Kulkarni, Marathi film actor
- Girish Mishra, Indian author
- Girish Panchwadkar, Marathi singer and music director
- Girish Paranjpe, Indian businessman
- Girish Sant, social activist and energy policy commentator
- Girish Shambu, American film blogger
- Girish Soni, Indian politician
- Girish Tiwari (Girda), activist and writer
- Girish Wagh, Indian businessman
- K. Gireesh Kumar, Malayalam film director and screenwriter

== See also ==
- Gayathri Girish, Carnatic vocalist
- Girish Mancha, auditorium in Kolkata
