= Girish Panchwadkar =

- Born: Rajan; 1 July 1960 (age 65); Solapur, Maharashtra, India
- Origin: Solapur, Maharashtra, India
- Genres: Marathi Film and light Music
- Occupation(s): Marathi film and light music
- Years active: 1994-onwards

Girish Panchwadkar (Marathi: गिरीश पंचवाडकर; born 1 July 1960) is a Marathi singer and music director from India.

== Career ==
Girish learned music from his father Bhalchandra Panchwadkar. He formed a music group "Kshitij". He started his performance through the program "Shabdswaranche Indradhanushya" in Solapur in 1992. He has been performing on stage since 1994. He has also performed in All India Radio, Solapur many times. He also performed on Doordarshan, E TV Marathi. On 2 March 2009 he performed 'Marathi Bhavgeet Maifal' in "Rashtrapati Bhavan", New Delhi when Hon.Pratibha Patil was our Rashtrapati.

Since the last 10 years he has been performing along with his "Kshitij Musical group" in every Ganesh Festival in New Delhi. He likes to sing the songs of Sudhir Phadke, Suresh Wadkar, and Arun Date, Md.Rafi & Manna Dey.

He performed his Sugam Sangeet Programmes almost all major cities in Maharashtra and out of Maharashtra in Delhi, Allahabad, Kanpur, Zansi, Lucknow, Faridabad, Gudgaon, Devas, Ratlam, Indore, Bhopal, Banglore, Chennai, Hyderabad, Gulbarga, Goa etc.

His performance is appreciated by the legendary Marathi Music Director & Singer Sudhir Phadke (Babuji), Singer Gajananrao Watve, Prabhkar Jog, Music Director Shridhar Phadke, Senior Poet Mangesh Padgaonkar, Geetkar Jagdish Khebudkar, Poet Praveen Davane, Music Director Nandu Honap, Singer Pt.Ajit Kadkade, Sr.Lavani Singer Sulochana Chavan, Marathi Actor Ravindra Mahajani, Dr. Girish Oak, Rahul Solapurkar, Sharad Ponkshe, TV actor Vighnesh Joshi, Shailesh Datar, Senior Marathi Actor Ramesh Deo-Seema, actress Asha Kale, Rashichakrakar Sharad Upadhye, Singer Uttara Kelkar, Film Director Rajdatta .

== List of Awards ==
- Maharashtra Government: Gunwan Kamgar Puraskar
- Maharashtra Gunijan Ratna Kalagaurva Puraskar, Mumbai
- Mahapour Gaurav Award – Best Artist( By Solapur Mahanagar Palika)
- Mauli Krutadnyata Gaurav Puraskar, Karad
- Indapur Bhushan Puraskar
- Best Singer Award by Vaishnavi Group, Solapur

== Personal life ==
Girish has been working in the Bank of Maharashtra since July 1982. He is Manager in Bank.

He has two kids. His son Akshay is Tabla Visharad and can play tabla, dholak and dholki. He is founder & Director of " NaadSaptak Music Academy" in Pune. In his Music academy, Tabla, Sugam Sangeet, Harmonium, Kathak Dance classes are conducted. Many students are learning in "Nadsaptak Academy, Pune". Akshay is also a director of "Yuva Kshitij", an organisation of young artists in Solapur and Pune. He is also an actor, script writer and a voice-over artist. Now he is doing M.A. in music.

Girish's daughter Dr.Aaditi is also a good Singer having melodious voice. She is learning Classical Music as well as Sugam Sangeet also. Recently She has received the "Balgandharva Puraskar" as an upcoming youth talented singer, by Shukla Yajurvediya Brahman Sangh, Pune in 2013. She is also performing Sugam Sangeet programmes since last 7 years.

== Main Programs and Performances ==
1. Shabd-Swaranche Indradhanushya, Solapur (1994)
2. PahatGani ( Diwali Pahat)
3. AkshayGani
4. Bhaktirang....( Marathi & Hindi Bhakti-Songs)
5. Marathi Bhavgeet Maifal at Rashtrapati Bhavan (2009)
6. Kalawedh – By "Yuva Kshitij" young Artists Group
7. Tuze Geet Ganayasathi.. ( Based on Poems & Songs Of Kavivarya Mangesh Padgaonkar)
8. To Rajhans Ek.. ( Songs written by G. D. Madgulkar)
9. Reshim Gaani (Songs of Senior Poet Smt.Shantabai Shelke)
10. Paus Gaani ( Marathi & Hindi Songs of Rains)
11. Madhuchandra...& Chandra Aahe Sakshila.... ( Musical Prog. of songs of Moon, on the occasion of Kojagiri Paurnima))
12. Aairanichya Deva Tula..(Songs written by Geetkar Jagdish Khebudkar)
13. Fulala Mani Vasant..(Songs of 3 Music Directors-Vasant Desai, Vasant Prabhu, & Vasant Pawar)
14. Bhairav te Bharavi (Songs based on Various Classical Ragas)
15. Kalpavruksha Kanyesathi...(Songs written by Jankavi P.Sawalaram)
16. Geet-Ramayan (Written by GD Madgulkar & Composed by Sudhir Phadke)
17. Dhundi Kalyana...Toch Chandrama Nabhat....& Ek Dhaga Sukhacha....( Songs composed by Gr8 Music Director Babuji-Sudhir Phadke)
18. Tarun Aahe Ratra Ajuni....( Only Marathi Bhavgeet prog.)
19. Abhang-Rang....(On the occasion of Ashadhi Ekadashi every year.)
20. Yaade, Black & White.....( Old Hindi Songs from only Black & White Films)
21. Gaane Suhane....( Songs from Hindi Films)
22. Yaman-rang....(Marathi Hindi songs based on Raag Yaman.)
