= Datta Walvekar =

Indian Marathi singer and music director

Dr. Datta Walvekar (Marathi: दत्ता वाळवेकर) (30 March 1928 in Belgaum, India – 16 March 2010 in Pune) was an Indian Marathi singer and music director.

== Background ==
Popularly known as 'Master Datta' in the decade of the 1950s. These programs used to be staged in the big gatherings named "Melas". Walvekar came to Karad at the age of 6, in 1944. There he started acting in Marathi Plays, also started singing at the age of 14, in gatherings of social, cultural platforms of Melas. Walvekar started his career as a singer, by imitating his idol, Gajanan Watve, in the year 1948.

== Career as an actor ==
Walvekar also acted in Marathi Plays like "Yudhdhachya Sawlya" written by Gajanan Digambar Madgulkar (popularly known as Ga Di Ma), and "Lagnachi Bedi", written by Pralhad Keshav Atre, and enacted by Veteran actor Bapurao Mane. He was fortunate enough to have company of big personalities. His contemporary singers were Babanrao Nawdikar, Govind Kurwalikar, Kumudini Pednekar etc.

== Contribution on radio ==
Walvekar also directed many musicals on All India Radio, Pune and Mumbai. He composed songs for the programs of Doordarshan Mumbai. He was given a musical play to direct by the then Producer of All India Radio, Sitakant Lad, for the Inaugural function of New Building of All India Radio in Pune.

Style and type of Singing

Most important features of his singing style was his melodious voice. In his early twenties, he used to sing the songs of female origin also. His clear pronunciation of the words, melodious presentation with the emotions, used to impress the audiences on large scale.

Public Performances

In those days of 1950 and 1960, the meaningful Marathi poetry and songs were presented by the legendary singers like Datta Walvekar and Gajanan Watve, before the audience of thousands in all parts of Maharashtra.

In the public functions of Ganesh Festivals, Navratri or any other religious functions, he used to present a bouquet of love songs, patriotic songs as well as the comic songs to satisfy the demand from his fans and audiences. It was the time, when there were no TV Channels and no other ways of entertainment like after the year 1990. All India Radio was the only electronic Medium of entertaining and informing the audiences. Out of the public Performing Arts, Drama, Folk dance, Folk Music and Classical as well as Semi Classical Music was performed in close door or out door Programs before thousands of the fans. Master Datta was not only appreciated because of his sweet voice, by the audiences, but was flooded with the offers of the Public programs from various parts of the state.

Datta Walvekar had performed his musical programs and songs by himself, with his troupe, in almost all the states of India and all districts of Maharashtra.

== Other career ==
Master Datta Walvekar, since his Young years, was a fan of literature Gajanan Digambar Madgulkar, Actor Singer Balagandharva, and Music Director Shriniwas Khale. He used to call them as his Gods.

Datta Walvekar completed his education in the Linguistic, with his research on Khatri language, he got Doctorate from the University of Pune in 1976, under the guidance Dr. R. S. Walimbe. Datta Walvekar also served in Public Works Department of Government of Maharashtra, in New English School Tilak Road and Raman Bag, and in Brihan Maharashtra College of Commerce Pune, as a teacher and lecturer. He had hobbies like Photography, Painting and also writing short stories and Radio Plays. He had painted cover pages of some Magazines and Periodicals in Marathi. He had written many short stories, published in many periodicals like Bua, Jatra, Vahini, Maher, Menaka, Sakal. He had written 18 th chapter of Bhagvadgeeta in a short space equal to two fingers, in micro letters.

== Publications ==
He wrote his autobiography " Pushpavin Kalpataru", which was published by Shrividya Prakashan in Pune in 2007, in the hands of Music Director Shriniwas Khale and Singer Gajanan Watwe. His second book "Kshatra Boli" was a developed version of his research on Khatri Language and community.

Younger generation always used to seek his advice on practising music and doing regular "Riyaz", of singing with emotion and expression in voice, with maximum importance to the words in poetry and literary compositions of the songs. He was often invited to many musical concerts and competitions as Chief Guest and Judge.

== Awards and felicitations ==
Datta Walvekar was awarded PhD by University of Pune in 1976, for his Research on Khatri Language.

He was awarded the Life Time Achievement award by All India Marathi Literary Meet in Pune in 2003 and All India Marathi Theatre meet at Karad in 2006, for his outstanding contributions in Music and Theatre.

He was also felicitated by All India Kshatriya Community, Maharashtra Sahitya Parishad, Pune Marathi Granthalaya, Deccan Education Society, Vithal Rakhumai Devasthan – Shrikshetra Pandharpur, for his contribution in Music.
