= Shridhar Phadke =

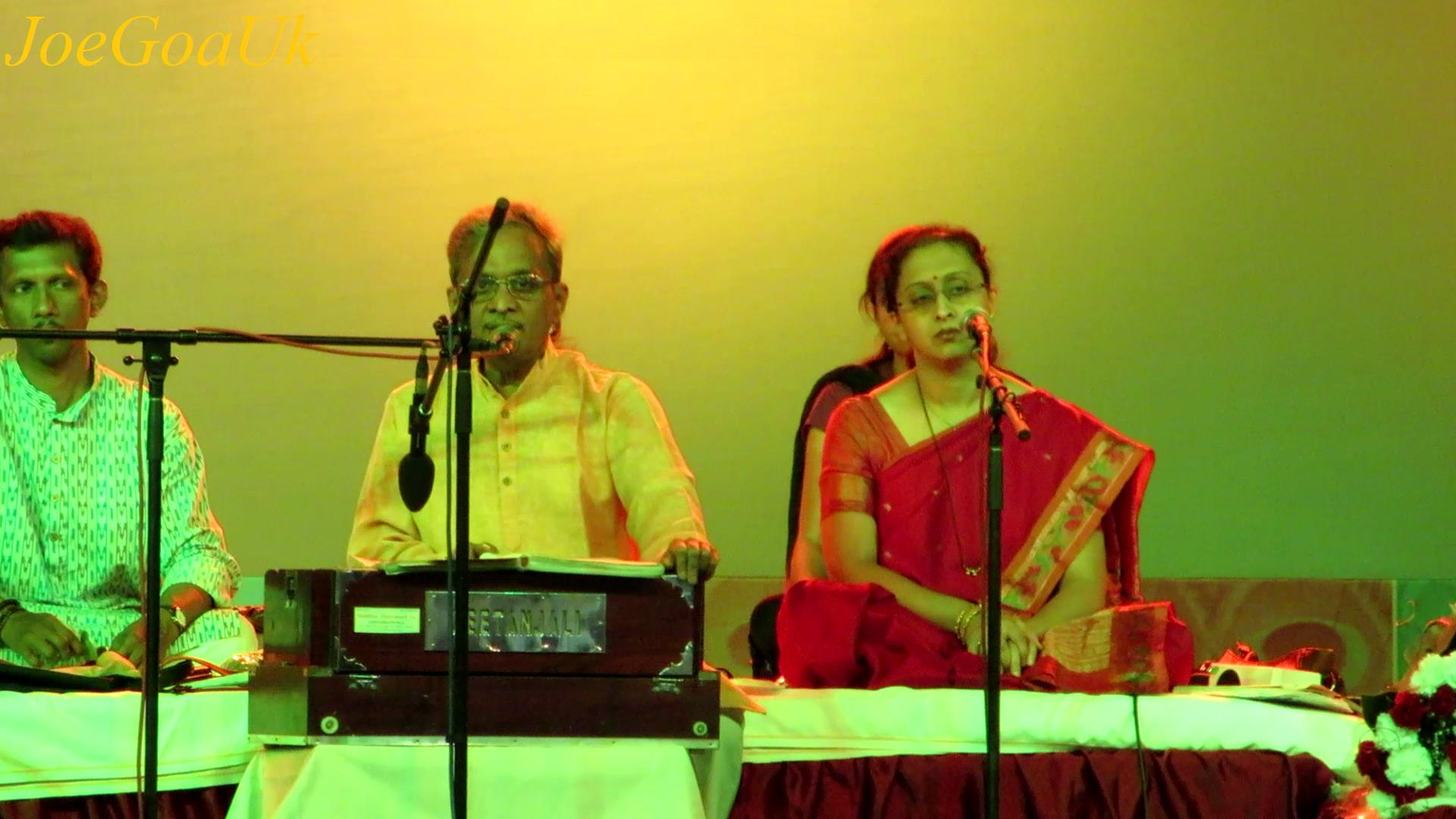
- Shridhar Phadke at IFFI 2012

Background information
- Born: Shridhar Sudhir Phadke; 9 September 1950 (age 75)
- Origin: Mumbai, Maharashtra, India
- Genres: Indian classical music
- Occupations: Singer and composer
- Instrument: Vocal

Shridhar S. Phadke (Marathi: श्रीधर फडके, born 9 September 1950) is a famous Marathi language music composer from Maharashtra, India.

== Early life ==
Shridhar Phadke was born on 9 September 1950 in Mumbai. He is son of the famous Marathi singer and composer Sudhir Phadke and singer Lalitabai Phadke. He completed his education from D. G. Ruparel College of Arts Science and Commerce and later did his post graduation in Information Technology in United States of America in the decade of 1970. Later he joined Air India. He retired from Air India as Executive Director-IT in the year 2009.

He has not undergone any formal training for music. When Shridhar Phadke was in USA for his post graduation, he composed his first tune for a devotional song Devachiye Dwari. Sudhir Phadke heard this song and appreciated the tune. Sudhir Phadke also sung this song in one of his programs in the USA. Later this song was recorded in the voice of Suresh Wadkar for album Omkar Swaroopa (Marathi: ॐकार स्वरूपा).

== Career ==
Shridhar Phadke started his career as a music director with the film Laxmichi Paule (Marathi: लक्ष्मीची पाउले). Earlier it was decided that Sudhir Phadke would compose music for this film. But the director heard the tune of the song 'Phite Andharache Jaale' (Marathi: फिटे अंधाराचे जाळे) composed by Shridhar Phadke. He liked the tune very much and decided to include this song in the film. Later it was decided that all songs from this film be composed by Shridhar Phadke. Around the same time he met the producer of an America-based company Neelam Audio & Video and both decided to produce a Marathi cassette of his ten compositions. It was released as Swaravel स्वरवेल in 1984 in the United States.

=== Composer ===
Shridhar Phadke has composed music for many Hindi, Marathi films. Some of them can be listed as:

- Laxmichi Paule (Marathi: लक्ष्मीची पाउले)
- Hridaisparshi (Marathi: ह्रदयस्पर्शी)
- Gharabaaher (Marathi: घराबाहेर)
- Vaarsa Laxmicha (Marathi: वारसा लक्ष्मिचा)
- Putravati (Marathi: पुत्रवती)
- Lekru (Marathi: लेकरू)
- Vishwavinayak (Marathi: विश्वविनायक)

Shridhar Phadke has composed many independent albums as well. Some of the very famous albums are:

- Rutu Hirawa (Marathi: ऋतु हिरवा)
- Bhavdhara (Marathi: भावधारा)
- Swarvel (Marathi: स्वरवेल)
- Gajavadan Sundar (Marathi: गजवदन सुंदर) Devotional songs sung by Anuradha Paudwal
- Omkar Swaroopa (Marathi: ॐकार स्वरूपा)
- Aboliche Bol (Marathi: अबोलीचे बोल)
- Ghan Barase Halakasa (Marathi: घन बरसे हलकासा)
- He Gagana (Marathi: हे गगना)
- Tejomaya Naadabramha (Marathi: तेजोमय नाद्ब्रम्ह)
- Kaahi Bolayache Aahe (Marathi: काहि बोलायाचे आहे)
- Tallinn Govinde (Marathi: तल्लीन गोविंदे)
- Sur Varada Rama (Marathi: सुर वरद रामा)
- Phite Andharache Jaale (Marathi: फिटे अंधाराचे जाळे)
- Sangeet Manamohi Re (Marathi: संगीत मनमोही रे)
- Rat Re Gurucharani (Marathi: रत रे गुरुचरणी)
- Avagha Vitthaloo (Marathi: अवघा विठ्ठलु)
- Lilaav (Marathi: लीलाव)
- Sakar gandhar ha (2013)
- Sadaphuli (2016)

=== Concerts ===
Shridhar Phadke regularly performs all over the world. Following are some of his concerts:

- Rutu Hirawa (Marathi: ऋतु हिरवा) Songs composed by Shridhar Phadke
- Babujinchi Gaani (Marathi: बाबूजींची गाणी) Songs composed/sung by Sudhir Phadke
- Geet Ramayan (Marathi: गीत रामायण) Songs from Geet Ramayan
- Phite Andharache Jaale (Marathi: फिटे अंधाराचे जाळे) Mix songs composed/sung by Shridhar Phadke and Sudhir Phadke
- Omkar Swaroopa (Marathi: ॐकार स्वरूपा) Devotional songs composed by Shridhar Phadke

=== Awards ===
Shridhar Phadke has won many prestigious awards for his compositions. These include:

- Filmfare Award (Marathi) (1994) for Best Music for film Varsa Laxmicha
- Filmfare Award (Marathi) (1996) for Best Music for film Putravati
- Filmfare Award (Marathi) (2000) for Best Music for film Lekaru.
