= Bhalchandra Panchwadkar =

- Origin: Pandharpur, Maharashtra, India
- Genres: Marathi light music
- Occupation(s): Music director, singer

Bhalchnadra Panchwadkar (Marathi: भालचंद्र पंचवाडकर), is a Marathi singer and music director.

== Personal life ==
Panchwadkar has two children. His son Girish Panchwadkar is a Marathi singer.
