= Suresh Wadkar =

Indian singer (born 1955)

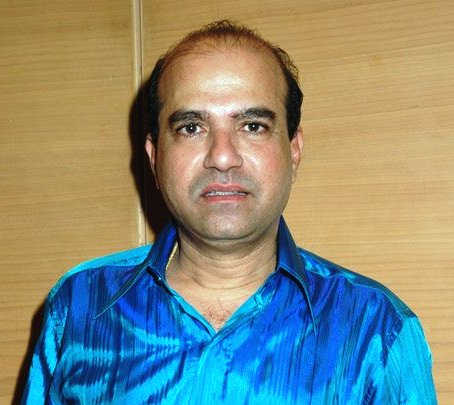
- Suresh Wadkar in 2008
- Born: Suresh Eshwara Wadkar; 7 August 1955 (age 71); Kolhapur, Bombay State (present–day Maharashtra), India
- Occupations: Playback singer music director
- Years active: 1976–present
- Spouse: Padma Wadkar (m. 1998)
- Children: 2
- Awards: Padma Shri (2021); Sangeet Natak Akademi Award (2018); Lata Mangeshkar Award (2023)
- Musical career
- Genres: Devotional; Classical; Ghazals
- Instrument: Vocals

Suresh Eshwara Wadkar (born 7 August 1955) is an Indian playback singer who performs in Hindi and Marathi films. He has also sung songs in some Bhojpuri films, Odia albums and bhajans and in Konkani films.

He was awarded the Sangeet Natak Akademi Award for 2018 for Sugam Sangeet. In 2020, the Government of India honoured him with the Padma Shri, the fourth highest civilian award of India.

== Early life and musical training ==
Suresh Eshwara Wadkar was born in Kolhapur in a middle-class family that soon moved to Girangaon. His father Eshwara Wadkar worked in cloth mills and his mother cooked food for the mill workers. In youth, he wrestled at akhadas and frequented the Talwalkar gym with his father, who was also a wrestler.

In 1968, when Wadkar was 13, Jialal Vasant encouraged him to work towards the "Prabhakar" certificate offered by the Prayag Sangit Samiti, because it was equivalent to a BEd and qualifies the awardee to teach professionally. Wadkar successfully completed his "Prabhakar" and joined Arya Vidya Mandir in Mumbai as a music teacher.

== Singing career ==
Though groomed for Indian classical music, Wadkar entered the Sur-Singar competition in 1976. He won the competition which was judged by composers from the Indian film industry including Jaidev and Ravindra Jain. Ravindra Jain introduced him to the world of playback singing, and Wadkar sang Jain's composition Sona Kare Jhilmil Jhilmil Vrishti Pade Tapur Tupur in the film Paheli (1977). Jaidev also offered him the song "Seene Mein Jalan" in the film Gaman (1978).

At the time, Lata Mangeshkar was so impressed with his voice that she strongly recommended him to film personalities including Laxmikant–Pyarelal, Khayyam and Kalyanji-Anandji. Laxmikant-Pyarelal, impressed with his voice, soon recorded a duet with Lata, "Chal Chameli Bagh Mein" for Krodhi (1981). Soon after, he was given the opportunity to perform for songs in Hum Paanch, Pyaasa Sawan ("Megha Re Megha Re") and above all, his turning point in films – Raj Kapoor's Prem Rog (1982). After that, Wadkar sang many songs under the R. K. Banner, and he often gave his voice for Rishi Kapoor in Henna, Prem Granth, Bol Radha Bol, Vijay and others. He also sang for Rajiv Kapoor in Ram Teri Ganga Maili. Two of his most famous songs are "Tum Se Milke" from Parinda (1989) and "Aye Zindagi Gale Laga Le" from Sadma (1983) and "Gori Sapno me hai" from Insaaf ki Manzil (1988). Wadkar sang his first Tamil song in the 2009 film Kanden Kadhalai, an adaptation of the Hindi blockbuster Jab We Met. The song is a ghazal type song called "Naan Mozhi Arindhaen". He has sung numerous devotional songs in various Indian languages for many denominations including many Vaishnav and Shaivite sampradayas such as the Swaminarayan Sampradaya. In 1996, Wadkar sang Channeache Rati among several other songs in Rajendra Talak's Konkani album Daryachya Deger with Asha Bhosle.

=== Marathi music career ===
Suresh Wadkar has worked with some of the top class Marathi music directors like Pt.Hridaynath Mangeshkar, Sudhir Phadke, Shrinivas Khale, Shridhar Phadke, Vasant Desai, Ashok Patki, Anil-Arun etc.

== Other work ==
In 2002, Wadkar produced the film "Tanman.com". In 2003, he collaborated with arist Shivanand (Udayraj A. Gadnis) on Cosmic Raga Mandal project. He was a judge on the Indian TV singing show Sa Re Ga Ma Pa L'il Champs and at the 2005 Sangeet Awards. In 2022, he was the judge for Zee TV's devotional music reality show Swarna Swar Bharat along with Kumar Vishwas and Kailash Kher.

=== Music schools ===
Wadkar is the director of the Ajivasan(Acharya Jialal Vasant Sangeet NIkaetan) Music Academy in Mumbai He also has a training institute in and New Jersey/New York City area. He has also started an online music school, called SWAMA (Suresh Wadkar Ajivasan Music Academy), under Ace Open University.

== Personal life ==
Wadkar is married to classical singer Padma and the couple has two daughters, Ananya and Jiya.

== Awards and nominations ==
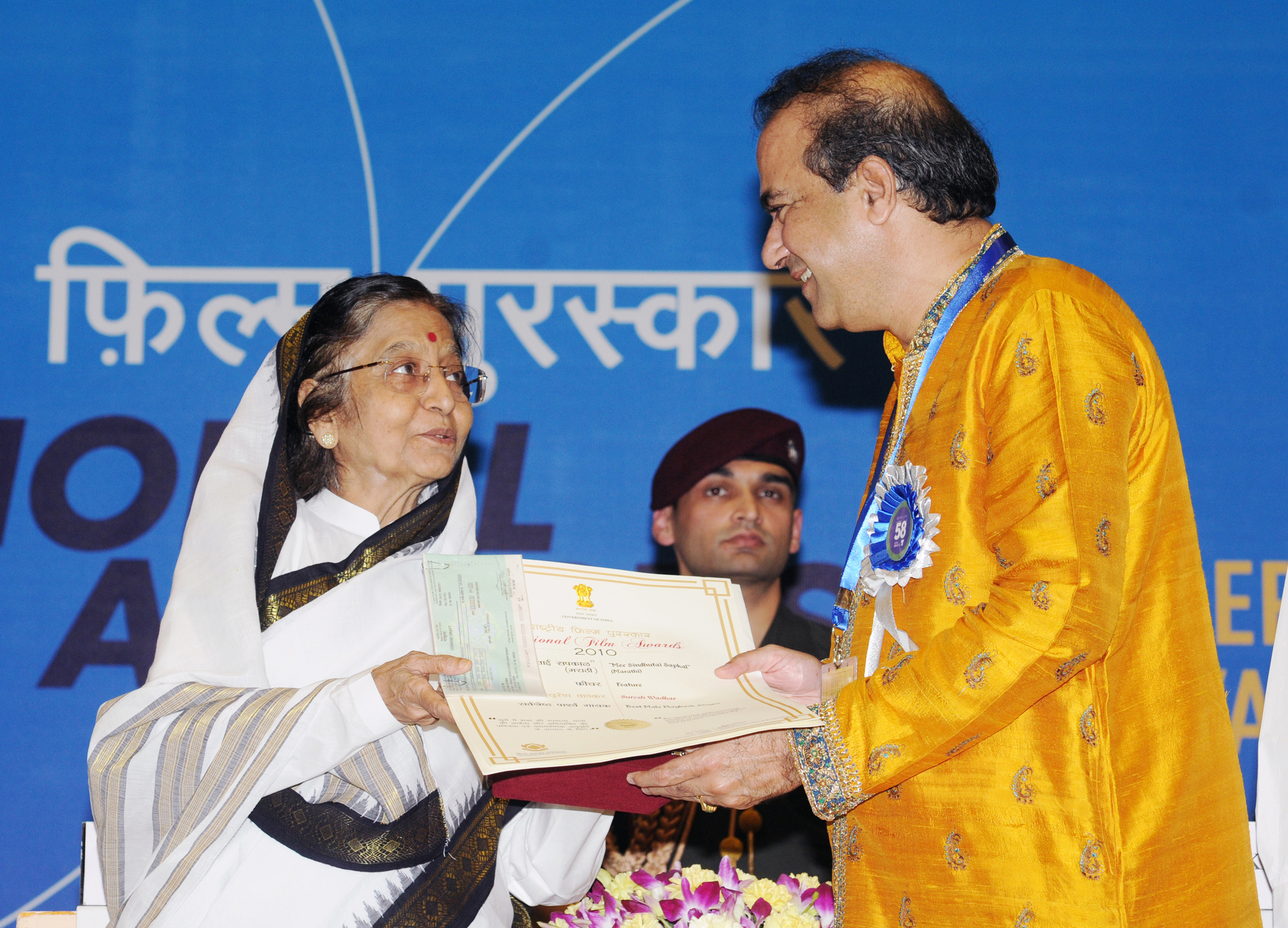
Wadkar was conferred upon the National Film Award for Best Male Playback Singer by President Pratibha Patil for his rendition of Hey Bhaskara in the biopic Mee Sindhutai Sapkal (2010).

In 1976, Wadkar won the Madan Mohan Best Male Playback Singer Award at the Sur-Singar competition. He is also a recipient of the 2004 Lata Mangeshkar Puraskar instituted by Madhya Pradesh government. He also won the 2007 Maharashtra Pride Award which is given by the government of Maharashtra to citizens of note. He got awarded by Late Sadashiv Amarapurkar Award 2017 by Ahmednagar's Think Global Foundation.

He was awarded the Sangeet Natak Akademi Award for 2018 for Sugam Sangeet. On January 25, 2020, his name was announced for Government of India's fourth highest civilian honour, the Padma Shri, for his work in the field of arts.

=== National Film Awards ===
==== Wins ====
- 2010 – Best Male Playback Singer – "Hey Bhaskara Kshitijavari Ya" (Mee Sindhutai Sapkal)

=== Filmfare Awards ===
He, along with KK, holds the record for most number of nominations for the Filmfare Award for Best Male Playback Singer without ever winning.

==== Nominations ====
- 1983 – Best Male Playback Singer – "Mein Hoon Prem Rogi" (Prem Rog)
- 1983 – Best Male Playback Singer – "Meri Kismat Mein Tu" (Prem Rog)
- 1986 – Best Male Playback Singer – "Main Hi Main Hoon" (Ram Teri Ganga Maili)
- 1990 – Best Male Playback Singer – "Lagi Aaj Sawan Ki" (Chandni)
- 1991 – Best Male Playback Singer – "O Priya Priya" (Dil)
- 1997 – Best Male Playback Singer – "Chappa Chappa Charkha Chale" (shared with Hariharan) (Maachis)

=== Maharashtra State Film Awards ===
- 1980 – Best Male Playback Singer – "Gandh Phulancha Gela Sangun" (Bhalu)
- 1981 – Best Male Playback Singer – "Aga Naach Naach Radhe" (Gondhalat Gondhal)
- 1982 – Best Male Playback Singer – "Aga Dis Jatil Dis Yetil" (Shapit)
- 1983 – Best Male Playback Singer – "Pahile Na Mi Tula" (Gupchup Gupchup)
- 1984 – Best Male Playback Singer – "Jeevanachi Ghadi" (Rath Jagannathacha)
- 1987 – Best Male Playback Singer – "Urala Surala Gharpan Sarala" (Khatyal Sasu Nathal Soon)
- 1988 – Best Male Playback Singer – "Me Avaguni" (Pandharichi Waari)
- 1990 – Best Male Playback Singer – "Ubhe Abhagi Jeevan Sare" (Aaghat)
- 1993 – Best Male Playback Singer – "Saibabancha Mahima Apaar" (Saibaba)
- 2000 – Best Male Playback Singer – "Kshitijavaril Tara" (Jodidaar)

=== Bengal Film Journalists' Association Awards ===
- 1986 – Best Hindi Male Playback Singer – "Ram Teri Ganga Maili Ho Gayee Hain" (Ram Teri Ganga Maili)

== Collaborators ==
Suresh Wadkar has sung for a variety of composers in the Indian film industry. These include:

- Shrinivas Khale (Marathi)
- Shridhar Phadke (Marathi)
- Anil-Arun
- Laxmikant Pyarelal
- Kalyanji Anandji
- R.D. Burman
- Ilayaraja
- Ravindra Jain
- Bappi Lahiri
- Khaiyyam
- Usha Khanna
- Arun Paudwal
- A.R. Rahman
- Vidyasagar
- Nadeem-Shravan
- Vishal Bhardwaj
- Rajesh Roshan
- Raamlaxman
- Shiv-Hari
- Jatin–Lalit
- Hridaynath Mangeshkar
- Shridhar Phadke
- Anand–Milind
- Anu Malik
- Himesh Reshammiya
- Shankar–Jaikishan
- Ravi
- Chitragupta
- Rajkamal
- Jaidev
- Mohinderjit Singh
- Brahma Kumaris
- Kaushal Inamdar
- Dr Swaroop Roy
