= Bhoopali =

Hindustani raga

- Thaat: Kalyan
- Type: Audava
- Time of day: Early night, 7-9 PM
- Arohana: S R G P D S'
- Avarohana: S' D P G R S
- Pakad: S R G R S D1 S R G; S R G R S D1 S R G P G D P G R S; G R P G G R S R D1 S; G R S D1 S R G R P G D P G R S
- Chalan: S R G R S D1 S R G; S R G R S D1 P1; P1 D1 S R G R G; S R P G; G R S R G P; G P D P D D S’; P G P D P D S’ R’ G’ R’ G’; G’ R’ S’ D P G R S
- Vadi: G
- Samavadi: D
- Synonym: Bhup; Bhup Kalyan
- Equivalent: Mohanam; Major pentatonic scale

Bhoopali, also known as Bhoop, Bhopali, or Bhupali, is a Hindustani classical raga. Bhupālī, is a raag in Kalyan Thaat. It is a pentatonic scale (uses 5 notes in ascending and descending scale). Most of the songs in this raga are based on Bhakti rasa. Since it uses 5 notes, belongs to the "Audav jaati" of ragas.

The same raga in Carnatic music is known as Mohanam.

Raga Bhoopali, Raga Yaman, and Raga Bhairav tend to be the three basic ragas of Hindustani music, learned first by its students.

== Theory ==
Madhuvanti Pal plays raag Bhoopali on rudra veena

Karhade (2011) explains that raga Bhopali consists of just 5 notes—सा रे ग प ध (sa, re, ga, pa, and dha).

It does not use Ma (also called Madhyam) and Ni (also called Nishadh). It is said that the absence of Ni (representative of physical pleasure) and Ma (representative of loving) means this raga is about non-attachment.

The Introduction consists of two parts – Aaroh आरोह (where the notes are simply recited on an ascending scale) and Avaroha (where the notes are simply recited on a descending order)

Thereafter, with these same five notes, different combinations are made by the singer, similar to short phrases, also called "chalan."

=== Aroha and avaroha ===
The scale of Bhopali uses only Shuddh swaras.

- Aroha (ascent): Sa Re Ga Pa Dha Sa'
- Avaroha (descent): Sa'! Dha Pa Ga Re Sa

=== Vadi and samavadi ===
- Vadi

Gandhar – ga

- Samavadi

Dhaivat – Dha

=== Alap ===
1. S, D1, D1...S, R, - S...D1, S..., D1, - - - P1, S, - - D1, S, - D1, P1, P1, D1, D1 D1 S

=== Pakad and chalan ===
The Pakad (a catchphrase that often helps in identifying a raga) is:

S R G R S D1 S R G

or:

S R G R S D1 S R G P G D P G R S

or:

G R P G G R S R D1 S

or:

G R S D1 S R G R P G D P G R S

or:

G R P G S R D1 S

Some chalans (elaborations of the pakad) are:

1. S R G R S D1 S R G
2. S R G R S D1 P1
3. P1 D1 S R G R G
4. S R P G
5. G R S R G P
6. G P D P D D S’
7. P G P D P D S’ R’ G’ R’ G’
8. G’ R’ S’ D P G R S

Note: Normally written swaras (individual notes) indicate the middle octave. A swara immediately followed by 1 indicates the mandra saptak (lower octave) and ' indicates the taar saptak (higher octave).

A few movements in Bhopali are important to note. There is typically a slide when descending between Sa and Dha, as well as between Pa and Ga. These slides parallel each other and can be used to create symmetry about how the Swaras are developed. Also, many performers will bring out the Kalyan flavor of Bhopali by using abhasi of the notes Shuddha Ni and Tivra Ma. That is to say, these notes are only vaguely suggested in passing ornaments, not actually sung for long enough for the Swara to become a clear part of the raga. Some examples would be:

(N_{1})D_{1} S

P(m)P(m) D P

where the notes in parentheses are connected by slides or sung as meend.

=== Bandish ===
This bandish is bound with Teentaal (16 beats).

1 2 3 4 | 5 6 7 8 | 9 10 11 12 | 13 14 15 16 |

Asthayi:

D S D2 P | G2 R2 S R2 |

G2 _ G2 P | G2 R2 S _ |

S R2 G2 P | R2 G2 P D2 |

G2 P D2 P | G2 R2 S _ |

Antara:

G2 _ G2 G2 |P _ D2 P |

S' _ S' S' |D3 R3 S' _|

G3 G3 R3 S'|R3 R3 S' D3|

S' _ D2 P |G2 R2 S _|

The Asthayi starts with the 9th beat.

== Organisation and relationships ==
Raga Bhoopali belongs to the Kalyan Thaat.

Related ragas: Deshkar (a pentatonic raga belonging to the Bilawal Thaat with the same scale as Bhoopali). Shuddha Kalyan is another similar raga.

=== Samay (Time) ===
First part of night. 7-9

=== Rasa ===
Bhakti Rasa (Devotional)

The essence from the raga evokes the Shanti Rasa—peaceful and calming.

The Rasa can also be called Shanta Rasa

=== Film songs ===
Bhoopali is a popular raga used in Indian folk songs and thus in Hindi and other regional film songs.

Hindi:

- "Jyoti Kalash Chhalake" (Bhabhi Ki Chudiyan) (1961)
- "Pankh Hote To Ud Aati Re" (Sehra) (1963)
- "Main Jahaan Rahoon" (Namastey London) (2007)
- "Dil Hoom Hoom Kare" (Rudaali) (1993)
- "Sayonara Sayonara" (Love in Tokyo) (1966)
- "Dekha ek khwaab to yeh silsile hue" (Silsila)(1981)
- "Aayat" (Bajirao Mastani) (2015)
- "Neel Gagan Ki Chaanv Mein" (Amrapali) (1966)

Marathi: (Data in the table below is currently under revision, for what is in it is yet to be confirmed)

Song	Source Type	Film/Natak/Album	Year of First Release	Singer	Lyricist	Composer
Ghanashyama Sundara	Film	Amar Bhoopali	1951	Lata Mangeshkar, Panditrao Nagarkar	Honaji Bala	Vasant Desai
Dehaachi Tijori	Film	Aamhi Jato Amuchya Gava	1968	Sudhir Phadke	Jagdish Khebudkar	Sudhir Phadke
Sujana Kasa Mana Chori	Sangeet Natak	Swayamwar	1916	Balgandharva, Kumargandharva, Neelakshi Joshi, Madhuvanti Dandekar	K. P. Khadilkar	Bhaskarbuwa Bhakhle
Sharayu Tiravari Ayodhya	Song Cycle	Geet Ramayan	1955	Sudhir Phadke	G. D. Madgulkar	Sudhir Phadke
Jai Jai Maharashtra Maza	State Song of Maharashtra	Album	1960	Shahir Sable	Raja Badhe	Shrinivas Khale
Swaye Shri Ram Prabhu Aikati	Song Cycle	Geet Ramayan	1955	Sudhir Phadke	G. D. Madgulkar	Sudhir Phadke
Maze Maher Pandhari	Abhang	Album	—	Pt. Bhimsen Joshi, Kishori Amonkar	Sant Eknath Maharaj	Ram Phatak
Dhundh Madhumati Raat Re	Film	Keechak Wadh	1959	Lata Mangeshkar	G. D. Madgulkar	Master Krishnrao
Tujhya Kantisam Raktpataka	Film	Annapurna	1968	Suman Kalyanpur	G. D. Madgulkar	Snehal Bhatkar
Khel Mandiyela Valvanti Ghai	Abhang	Album	—	Lata Mangeshkar	Sant Tukaram Maharaj	Traditional
Airanichya Deva Tula	Film	Saadhi Manasa	1965	Lata Mangeshkar	Jagdish Khebudkar	Anandghan (Lata Mangeshkar)
Utha Pandharichya Raja	Film	Sant Gora Kumbhar	1967	Prasad Sawkar	G. D. Madgulkar	Sudhir Phadke
Uthi Uthi Gopala	Sangeet Natak	Dev Deenaghari Dhavla	1970	Kumargandharva	Bal Kolhatkar	Vasant Desai
Uthi Shri Rama	Film	Te Maze Ghar	1963	Asha Bhosle	Ravindra Bhat	Sudhir Phadke
Utha Utha Ho Sakalik	Bhupali/Devotional	Album	—	Lata Mangeshkar	Ramanand	Hridaynath Mangeshkar
Ata Visavyache Kshan	Bhavageet	Album	2013	Lata Mangeshkar	B. B. Borkar	Salil Kulkarni
Abir Gulal Udhalit Rang	Devotional Song	Album	—	Pt. Jitendra Abhisheki	Sant Chokhamela	Traditional
Omkar Pradhan Roop Ganeshache	Devotional Song	Album	—	Suman Kalyanpur	Sant Tukaram Maharaj	Kamalakar Bhagwat

Kannada:

- "Malgudi Days Theme Music"
- "Mohana Muraliya Naada Leelege"
- "Olave Jeevana Saakshaatkaara"
- "Bellane Belagayitu"
- "Aashaadha Maasa Bandeetavva"
- "Belliya Raja Baaro Kullara Raja Baa"
- "Utthunga Naadininda Ondu Hudugi (Folk)"
- "Nigi Ningee Ningi Ningee"
- "Hottito Hottitu Kannadada Deepa"
- "Udayavaagali Namma Cheluva Kannada Naadu"
- "Bayaside Ninnanu Bhaavada Melake"
- "Ellaadaru Iru, Entaadaru Iru"
- "Karunaalu Baa Belake"
- "Tungaa Teeradi Ninta Suyativara"
- "Teraa Yeri Ambaradaage"
- "Tunturu Alli Neera Haadu"
- "Sarasada Ee Prati Nimisha"
- "Amara Madhura Prema"
- "Malli Malli Minchulli"
- "Nanna Aase Hannaagi Nanna Baala Kannaade"
- "Innu Hattiraa Hattiraa Baruveya"
- "Radha Madhava Vinoda Haasa"
- "Yaava Janmada Maitri"
- "Kogile O Kogile"
- "Naliyutaa Hrudaya Haadanu Haadide"
- "Kogileye Kshemave"
- "Santasa Araluva Samaya"
- "Doni Sagali Munde Hogali"
- "Mudala Maneya Muttina Neerina"
- "Appaa I Love You Paa"
- "Jenina Holeyo Haalina Maleyo"
- "Naavaaduva Nudiye"
- "Om Karadi Kande"
- "Neela Megha Gaali Beesi"
- "Ee Hasiru Siriyali Manavu Mereyali"
- "Ee Sambhaashane"
- "Baanallu Neene Bhuviyallu Neene"
- "Yogi Manege Bandaa"
- "Mella Mellane Bandane"
- "Jayatu Jaya Viththala"
- "O Pandu Ranga Prabho Viththala"
- "Avatarisu Baa Narayana"
- "Pillangoviya"

=== Tamil movie songs in Mohanam ===
Song	Movie	Lyricist	Composer	Singer
Giridhara Gopala	Meera		S. V. Venkatraman	M. S. Subbulakshmi
Thillai Ambala Nadaraajaa	Soubhagyavathi	Pattukkottai Kalyanasundaram	Pendyala Nageswara Rao	T. M. Soundararajan
Nilavum Malarum	Then Nilavu	Kannadasan	A. M. Rajah	A. M. Rajah, P. Susheela
Aarumugamana Porul	Kandhan Karunai	Kannadasan	K. V. Mahadevan	S. Janaki, Rajalakshmi
Om Namasivaya	Thiruvilaiyadal	Kannadasan	K. V. Mahadevan	Sirkazhi Govindarajan, P. Susheela
Malargal Nanaindhana	Idhaya Kamalam	Kannadasan	K. V. Mahadevan	P. Susheela
Velli Mani Oosaiyil	Iru Malargal	Vaali	M. S. Viswanathan	P. Susheela
Chittukuruvikenna	Saavale Samali	Kannadasan	M. S. Viswanathan	P. Susheela
Iraivan Varuvan	Shanthi Nilayam	Kannadasan	M. S. Viswanathan	P. Susheela
Yaumuna Nadhi Inge	Gowaravam	Kannadasan	M. S. Viswanathan	S. P. Balasubramaniam, P. Susheela
Sangey Mozhangu	Kalangarai Vilakam	Bharathidasan	M. S. Viswanathan	P. Susheela, Seerkazhi Govindarajan
Thanga Thoniyile	Ulagam Sutrum Vaaliban	Vaali	M. S. Viswanathan	K. J. Yesudas, P. Susheela
Bansaye	Ulagam Sutrum Vaaliban	Vaali	M. S. Viswanathan	T. M. Soundarajan, L. R. Easwari
Kadaloram Vaangiya Kaatru	Rickshawkaaran	Vaali	M. S. Viswanathan	T. M. Soundarajan
Vanda naal mudhal	Paavamannippu	Kannadasan	M. S. Viswanathan	T. M. Soundarajan
Thiruchendoorin Kadalorathil Senthilnaathan	Dheivam	Kannadasan	Kunnakudi Vaidyanathan	T. M. Soundararajan, Seerkazhi Govindarajan
Neelakkadalin Oratthil	Annai Velankanni	Kannadasan	G. Devarajan	T. M. Soundararajan, P. Madhuri
Oru Kadhal Samrajyam	Nandha En Nila		V. Dakshinamoorthy	P. Jayachandran, T. K. Kala
Ninu Kori Varnam Isaithida	Agni Natchatram		Illayaraja	Chitra
Kanmaniye Kadhal Enbadhu	Aarilirunthu Arubathu Varai		Illayaraja	S. P. Balasubrahmanyam, S. Janaki
Nilavu thoongum	Kungumachimizh		Illayaraja	S. P. Balasubrahmanyam, S. Janaki
Iru Paravaigal	Niram Maratha Pookal		Illayaraja	Jency
Meenkodi Theril	Karumbhu Vil		Illayaraja	K.J. Yesudas, Jency Anthony
Vaan Pole Vannam	Salangai Oli	Vairamuthu	Illayaraja	S. P. Balasubhramaniam, S. P. Sailaja
Oru Thanga Rathathil	Dharma Yutham		Illayaraja	Malaysia Vasudevan
Kannan Oru kaikulanthai	Bhadrakali		Illayaraja	KJ Yesudas, P Susheela
Kaathirunthen Thaniye	Rasa Magan		Illayaraja	Chandrasekar, Srilekha
Sreeramane Unnai	Kangalin Vaarthaigal		Illayaraja	K. S. Chithra, Illayaraja
Oru Raagam	Anandha Ragam	Gangai Amaran	Illayaraja	K. J. Yesudas, S. Janaki
Geetham Sangeetham	Kokarako	Gangai Amaran	Illayaraja	S. P. Balasubrahmanyam
Poovil Vandu	Kaadhal Oviyam	Vairamuthu	Illayaraja	S. P. Balasubrahmanyam
Ravi varman oviyamo	Puthu vayal		Aravinth	S. P. Balasubrahmanyam
Sivappu Lolaku	Kaadhal Kottai		Deva	S. P. Balasubrahmanyam
Vellarika	Kaadhal Kottai		Deva	Krishnaraj
Nepala Malaiyoram	Thaikulame Thaikulame		Deva	S. P. Balasubhramaniam, Swarnalatha
Priya Priya	Kattabomman (film)		Deva	S. P. Balasubhramaniam, K.S.Chitra
Thoonganakuruvi	Jallikattu kalai		Deva	S. P. Balasubhramaniam, K.S.Chitra
Kadhal Kaditham	Cheran Pandiyan	Soundaryan		S.A. Rajkumar, Swarnalatha
Boom Boom	Boys	Kabilan	A. R. Rahman	Adnan Sami, Sadhana Sargam
Ennodu Nee Irundhaal	I	Kabilan	A. R. Rahman	Sid Sriram, Sunitha Sarathy
Porale Ponnuthayi	Karuthamma	Vairamuthu	A. R. Rahman	Unni Menon, Sujatha Mohan, Swarnalatha(Pathos)(Won National Award)
Madrasai Suthi (Ragamalika:Mohanam, Punnagavarali)	May Maadham	Vairamuthu	A. R. Rahman	Shahul Hameed, Swarnalatha, G. V. Prakash & Manorama
Pakkada Pakkade	Gentleman	Vairamuthu	A. R. Rahman	Minmini
Varayo Thozhi	Jeans	Vairamuthu	A. R. Rahman	Sonu Nigam, Harini
Samba Samba	Love Birds	Vairamuthu	A. R. Rahman	Aslam Mustafa
Kannai Katti Kollathey	Iruvar	Vairamuthu	A. R. Rahman	Hariharan
Poi Solla Poren	Thiruttu Payale	Vairamuthu	Bharadwaj	KK, Kanmani
Oru Kathal Enpathu	Chinna Thambi Periya Thambi	Vairamuthu	Gangai Amaran	S. P. Balasubrahmanyam, S. Janaki
Chinnapattam Poochi	Sugamana Sumaigal	Vairamuthu	Chandrabose	K. S. Chithra, Mano
Kaalai Neeye	Kaalaiyum Neeye Maalaiyum Neeye	Vaali	Devendran	S. Janaki
Malaiya Kodainju Pathaya Amaichen	Pudhu Padagan	S. Thanu		S. P. Balasubrahmanyam, K. S. Chithra
Unnai Ninachi	Avathara Purushan		Sirpy	S. P. Balasubrahmanyam, K. S. Chithra
Mudhal Mudhalai	Varushamellam Vasantham		Sirpy	P. Unnikrishnan, Sujatha
Pottu Mela Pottu	Janakiraman		Sirpy	S. P. Balasubrahmanyam, Anuradha Sriram
Mainaave Mainaave	Thithikudhe		Vidyasagar	P. Unnikrishnan, Sadhana Sargam
Rosave Rosave	Ellaichami	Pulamaipithan	S. A. Rajkumar	Malaysia Vasudevan, K. S. Chithra
Maname Thottal	Thottachinungi		Phillip Jerry	Hariharan, K. S. Chithra
Kadhalithal Anandham	Style		Bharani	Hariharan, K. S. Chithra
Uchi Mudhal	Sukran	Vijay Antony		Timmy, Gayathri
Engeyum Kadhal	Engeyum Kadhal	Thamarai	Harris Jayaraj	Aalap Raju, Devan Ekambaram, Ranina Reddy

Malayalam movie songs in Mohanam (Selected)
Song	Movie	Lyricist	Composer	singer(s)
Malini nadiyil	Sakunthala	Vayalar Ramavarma	G Devarajan	KJ Yesudas, P Suseela
Manjalayil mungi thorthi	Kalithozhan	P Bhaskaran	G Devarajan	P Jayachandran
Manjani Poonilaav	Nagarame Nandi	P Bhaskaran	K Raghavan	S Janaki
Suprabhatham (neelagiriyude)	Panitheeratha Veedu	Vayalar Ramavarma	MS Viswanathan	P Jayachandran
Chandrikayilaliyunnu	Bharyamar Sookshikkuka	Sreekumaran Thampi	V Dakshinamoorthy	KJ Yesudas, P Leela, AM Raja
Pournami Chandrika	Rest House	Sreekumaran Thampi	MK Arjunan	KJ Yesudas
Madhuchandrikayude	Anachadanam	Vayalar Ramavarma	G Devarajan	P Jayachandran
Swargaputhri Navarathri	Nizhalattam	Vayalar Ramavarma	G Devarajan	KJ Yesudas
Guruvayurambala Nadayil	Othenante makan	Vayalar Ramavarma	G Devarajan	KJ Yesudas
Ezharapponnana purath	Akkarappacha	Vayalar Ramavarma	G Devarajan	P Madhuri
Nin maniyarayile	CID Nazir	Sreekumaran Thampi	MK Arjunan	P Jayachandran
Arivin Nilave	Rajashilpi	ONV Kurup	Raveendran	KS Chithra
Etho nidrathan	Ayal Katha Ezhuthukayanu	Kaithapram	Raveendran	KJ Yesudas
Maarikkuliril neela thulasi	Kouravar	Kaithapram	SP Venkitesh	KJ Yesudas, KS Chithra
Chandanalepa Sugandham	Oru vadakkan veeragatha	K Jayakumar	Ravi Bombay	KJ Yesudas
Aareyum Bhava gayakan aakkum	Nakhakshathangal	ONV Kurup	Ravi Bombay	KJ Yesudas
Maayaponmane	Thalayanamanthram	Kaithapram	Johnson	KS Chithra
Manje vaa madhuvidhu vela	Thusharam	Yousuf Ali Kechery	Shyam	KJ Yesudas, SP Balasubrahmaniam
Thaara noopuram chaarthi	Sopanam	Kaithapram	SP Venkitesh	KJ Yesudas, Manju Menon
Mouliyil mayilpeeli	Nandanam	Gireesh Puthenchery	Raveendran	KS Chithra
Ponkasavu njoriyum	joker	Yousuf Ali Kechery	Mohan Sithara	P Jayachandran, KS Chithra
Parvanendu mukhi	Parinayam	Yousuf Ali Kechery	Ravi Bombay	KS Chithra
Kaliveedurangiyallo	Deshadanam	Kaithapram	Kaithapram	KJ Yesudas
Aakasha neelima	Kayyum thalayum purathidaruth	Mullanezhi	Raveendran	KJ Yesudas
Nee en sarga soundaryame	Kathodu kathoram	ONV kurupp	Ouseppachan	KJ Yesudas, Lathika

== See also ==
- Durga
- Shivaranjani
