= Monika Boehm-Tettelbach =

German Indologist (1941–present)

Monika Boehm-Tettelbach (also known as Monika Horstmann, Thiel-Horstmann, Jordan-Horstmann; born in Berlin, 1941) is a German Indologist and an emerita professor at Heidelberg University. She is known for her work on the religious history and literature of northern India from the 16th century.

== Life ==
Monika Boehm-Tettelbach studied ethnology, Indology, Hittite and Avestan at the Free University of Berlin between 1960–66. She received her doctoral degree with a thesis on Sadani, a dialect of the Bhojpuri language spoken in Bihar.

She worked at the Free University until 1969, and then at the Heidelberg University's Indological seminar till 1973. For her habilitation, she presented work on Sadani folk song traditions. In 1976, she was visiting faculty at Stockholm University; from 1985–1986, she worked at the Institute of Oriental Languages of the Australian National University. In 1989, she obtained a professorship at the University of Cologne, before returning to Heidelberg in 1990, where she became Dean of the Faculty of Language and Literary Studies. She was the head of the Department of Contemporary South Asian Studies at Heidelberg until her retirement in 2006.

She established Indological Institutes at the University of Bamberg and the University of Cologne. She was awarded the Landeslehrpreis des Landes Baden-Württemberg für das Sprachprogramm des Südasien-Instituts by the German government in 2004.

She was elected an honorary fellow of The Sanskrit College and University in Kolkata in 1992. In 2017, she was elected an International Honorary Member of the American Academy of Arts and Sciences.

== Research ==
Boehm-Tettelbach's linguistic work on the Sadani language was published under the name Jordan-Horstmann. Her researches into Dadu Dayal and his sect, and her translations of his songs were published under Thiel-Horstmann, while her investigations of the Jaipur royals appeared under Horstmann.

=== Linguistics ===
Jordan-Horstmann's monograph on Sadani, a Bhojpuri dialect, was published in 1969, a translation of her 1966 doctoral thesis. She documented the state of flux of the language, where speakers were often using Hindi words in place of Sadani. However, her structural description of the language itself in non-technical terms, and the awkward use of morphophonemes, as well as analytical errors, were criticised.

=== Religion ===
Jordan-Horstmann published works on Bhojpuri folk songs in 1975, followed by studies on their Christian versions.

Her focus shifted to the bhakti religious and social traditions of north India. She wrote on sant groups as well as Sikh, Krishna and Rama devotional rites. She investigated archives in Rajasthan, establishing a typology for difficult-to-read documents, and combined these researches with fieldwork and sociological study.

As Thiel-Horstmann, her translation of Dadu Dayal's poetry was published in 1991. Dadu was an itinerant bhakti saint. Thiel-Horstmann prepared a collection of 443 pada hymns, and established how they were created via the common cultural background of the author and audience. Dadu, she showed, shared his inspiration with earlier saints of the Panchvani as well as Guru Nanak, the founder of the Sikh faith. The songs drew on the western Indian tradition of dhol songs, and were similar to the lyrical formulas of Mirabai. These were multilingual creations and widely distributed by his followers.

=== Politics ===
Horstmann's monograph on Pratap Singh, a monarch of Jaipur, appeared in 2013. She showed how religious rites legitimated regnal power in Rajasthan as in other parts of India and Nepal. Despite the monarchy being hereditary, Pratap Singh's dynasty, the Kachwahas, required constant confirmation from other clans and religious notables. The arrival of the Pushtimarg sect led to its preeminence in the royal court and clashes with the Jain community, possibly for economic reasons. She showed the continuity of court rituals down to the 21st century and the enthronement of Padmanabh Singh in 2011. Despite the abolition of royal titles in India in 1970, the investiture demonstrated the reinforcement of ancient politico-religious rites to present a type of stability. The monograph was appreciated for its extensive archival research and careful philological analysis.

== Selected works ==
- Sadani. A Bhojpuri Dialect Spoken in Chotanagpur (Bihar). Indologia Berolinensis. Vol. 1. Wiesbaden: Otto Harrassowitz. 1969.
- Sadani-Lieder. Studien zu einer nordindischen Volksliedliteratur. Neuindische Studien (in German). Vol. 5. Wiesbaden: Otto Harrassowitz. 1978.
- Crossing the Ocean of Existence. Braj Bhāṣā Religious Poetry from Rajasthan. A Reader. Wiesbaden: Otto Harrassowitz. 1983.
- Nächtliches Wachen. Eine Form indischen Gottesdienstes. Indica et Tibetica (in German). Vol. 6. Bonn: Indica et Tibetica Verlag. 1985.
- Leben aus der Wahrheit. Texte aus der heiligen Schrift der Sikhs. Klassiker der östlichen Meditation (in German). Vol. 3. Zürich: Benziger. 1988.
- Dādū. Lieder. Beiträge zur Südasienforschung (in German). Vol. 138. Stuttgart: Franz Steiner. 1991.
- In Favour of Govinddevjī. Historical Documents Relating to a Deity of Vrindaban and Eastern Rajasthan. In collaboration with Heike Bill. Delhi: Indira Gandhi National Centre for the Arts and Manohar. 1999.
- Banāsā. A Spiritual Autobiography. Wiesbaden: Otto Harrassowitz. 2003.
- Felsinschriften. Zeitgenössische Hindi-Lyrik. Moderne indische Literatur (in German). Vol. 7. Heidelberg: Draupadi-Verlag. 2007.
- Der Zusammenhalt der Welt. Religiöse Herrschaftslegitimation und Religionspolitik Mahārājā Savāī Jaisinghs (1700–1743). Khoj – A Series of Modern South Asian Studies (in German). Vol. 8. Wiesbaden: Otto Harrassowitz. 2009.
