= Ramachandra Krishanji Phatak =

Indian composer and singer

Ramachandra Krishnaji Phatak
- Born: October 21, 1917
- Died: September 26, 2002 (aged 84)
- Other name: Ram Phatak
- Known for: Marathi music

Ramachandra Krishnaji Phatak (Marathi: रामचंद्र कृष्णाजी फाटक) (October 21, 1917 – September 26, 2002), also known as Ram Phatak (Marathi: राम फाटक), was a Marathi music composer and singer. His famous compositions include several songs by Bhimsen Joshi and Sudhir Phadke .
