= Girish Mishra =

Indian writer

Dr. Girish Mishra was an Indian author, columnist, teacher and commentator. He is famous for his commentary on Indian economy for nearly past half century.

== Life ==
Dr. Girish Mishra Born in Champaran, Bihar. He earned a Master of Arts as well as a Doctorate in Economics with an emphasis on Economic History. He was Reader in Economics, Kirori Mal College at University of Delhi,(India).

He has written extensively for all leading Indian dailies and periodicals including The Times of India, Hindu, Indian Express, Mainstream Weekly, Economic and Political Weekly and Dainik Jagran.

He has many books on topics related to Economy and Economic History.

Mishra died on 27 April 2019 and was cremated at Dayanand Muktidham Crematorium, Lodhi Road, New Delhi. He is succeeded by his two sons, Sanjay and Anurag Mishra.

== Books ==
=== Books in English ===
- Safedposho Ka Aapradh,
- Imaging architects: Creativity in the religious monuments of India (2002)
- Rammanohar Lohia, the man and his ism (1992)
- Sociology and Economics of Cateism in India (with Braj Kumar Pandey, Dec 2002)
- White-collar crimes (1998)
- Malthus and his ghost(2001)
- Nehru and the Congress Economic Policies (1988)
- Balzac: Mirror of Emerging Modern Capitalism(2002)
- Comparative Economic Development (1996)
- An Economic History of Modern India (1994 & 1997)
- Intellectual Property Rights And NIEO (1990)
- Debt Problems - Dimensions and Approaches(1989)
- Western Financial Institutions And Developing Countries(1987)
- Economic Systems (1986, 1991 and 1997)
- Economic Effects of Militarisation - edited(1984)
- A Study of Soviet Constitution : Economic Aspects (1984)
- Relevance of Indo-soviet Economic Relations (1983)
- Some Economic Aspects of New Soviet Constitution (1980)
- Contours of Indo-soviet Economic Relations
- Agrarian problems of permanent Settlement - A Case Study of Champaran (1978)
- Public Sector in Indian Economy (1975)

=== Books in Hindi ===
- Adhunik Bharat Ka Arthik Itihas (1997)
- Arthik Pranaliyan (1981)
- Soviet Samvidhan Ke Arthik Paksha (1980)

=== Papers ===
- "Agricultural Labour in Bihar" (Agricultural Situation in India -Oct 1995)
- "Indigo Plantation and Agrarian Relations in Champaran During the 19th Century" (Indian Economic and Social history Review Vol III No. 4)
- "Socio-Economic Background of Gandhi's Movement in Champaran" (Indian Economic and Social history Review Vol V No. 3)
- "Socio-Economic Roots of Casteism in Bihar" (Transition From capitalism to Socialism and Other Essays - KM Ashraf Memorial Trust)
- "Role of State Sector in Indian Economy" (Role of State Sector in Developing Countries, 1977)
- "Economic Development in India Since Independence" (Democracy In India :Challenges And Perspectives Edited by Prof. R P Dhokalia, published by BHU 1975)
- "Intermediary Tenure Holders Under Permanent Settlement" (Marxist Miscellany Sep. 1976)
- "Some Aspects of Bihar's Industrial Economy on the Eve of Independence" (The Indian Historical Review, Vol. X, No 1- 2)
- "Some Aspects of Bihar's Industrial Economy on the Eve of Independence" (Studies in History And Society : Myth and Reality)
- "Some Aspects of Bihar's Industrial Economy on the Eve of Independence" (The Struggle For Freedom In India 1945-47 published by Nehru Memorial Museum and Library) Memorial Museum and Library
- "Elite People Dichotomy : An Exaggerated View"(The Indian Historical Review, Vol. X, No 1- 2)
- "Indo-Soviet Trade : Some Controversies" (The USSR in Transition, edited by Prof R R Sharma)
- "Some Aspects of Indo-Soviet Economic Relations" (Asian Dimension of Soviet Policy, edited by D D Nirula and Prof. R R Sharma)
- "Indo-Soviet Economic Relations" (Studies in Indo-Soviet Relations, 1986)
- "Economic Co-Operation in South Asia" (Nehru's Vision Edited by PN Haksar 1987)
- "Political Economy of Neo- Colonialism" (India's unity and Security : Challenges)
- "Historical Roots of Indo-Soviet Economic Co-Operation" (Sinews of Self Reliance, edited by Girish Mathur, 1987)
- "Some Aspects of Present Day Fascism" (Challenge of Fascism in Contemporary World)
- "Economics of Communalism in India" (Religious Fundamentalism in Asia, 1994)
- "Some Aspects of Changing Agrarian Structure in Pre Independence Bihar " (Peasants in Indian History 1996)
- " The Sathi Land Agitation in Champaran" (Peasant Struggle in Bihar, 1994)

=== Translation from English into Hindi ===
- A Contribution to the Critique of Political Economy by Karl Marx
- Fundamental Problems of Marxism by G V Plekhanov
- Biography of Engels by Zelda K. Coates

*A Science in Its Youth by Anikin

== Seminars abroad ==
- 1974 Bulgaria Problems of Economic Planning in Developing Countries
- 1978 Bulgaria Problems of Capital Accumulation
- 1979 France Role of TNCs in Developing Countries
- 1986 Uzbekistan Indo-Soviet Relations 18th-20th Centuries
- 1988 Germany Economic Development in the Third World
- 1989 Uzbekistan or Russia Nehru's Contribution to Indo-Soviet Relations

Currently he is working on several books for National Book Trust.
