= Upendra Bhat =

Indian Classical Singer

Upendra Bhat is a singer of Hindustani classical music, from the Kirana Gharana, who reminds the listeners of his legendary Guru – Pandit Bhimsen Joshi.

== Career ==
Born and brought up in Mangalore, a city in Kanara; Upendra began his musical career under Sangeeth Vidwan Shri Narayan Pai of Mangalore. He then received further training under Madhava Gudi, a senior disciple of Pandit Bhimsen Joshi. In 1980 Upendra shifted to Pune. Since then, he has been under the vigilant eyes of his Guru and has been receiving regular training from Bhimsenji.

In 1996, on the occasion of the 7th Birth Anniversary of Jñāneśvar, Upendra was felicitated for his musical talent at the hands of the Honourable President of India, Shri Shankar Dayal Sharma. He received the "Musician of the year Award" in the year 2000, from the Andhra Pradesh Association of North America. He was also awarded a citation for his contribution as a classical vocalist, during the 'Millennium Konkani Sammelan', held in Chicago, in the year 2000.

He also did a rendition of some of Bhimsen's songs in a concert after his guru's death.

== Recent achievements ==
Today, Upendra Bhat is an acclaimed classical vocalist. He holds a master's degree in Music – Sangeet Visharad and Sangeet Alankar – awarded by Akhil Bharatiya Gandharva Mahavidyalaya, Bombay. He is the graded artist of the All India Radio. His concerts are regularly broadcast or telecast by Radio and different TV channels. Apart from these he has given performances at several prestigious concert platforms like "Harivallabh Sangeet Sammelan'Jalandhar, 'Sawai Gandharva Music Festival', Pune and so on, both in India and in other countries like the UK, US, Dubai and Bahrain etc.
