= Girish Bihari =

Indian police officer (1938–2009)

Dr. Girish Bihari
- Born: 5 March 1938; Faizabad, Uttar Pradesh
- Died: 29 April 2009 (aged 71); Lucknow, Uttar Pradesh
- Occupations: Educationist, IPS Officer

Dr Girish Bihari (5 March 1938 – 29 April 2009) was an Indian educationist and Indian Police Service (IPS) officer. He joined the IPS in 1961, and held the post of Director General of Police in the state of Uttar Pradesh during the period 12 August 1995 – 31 March 1996. He retired from the IPS in March 1996 and died on 29 April 2009.

== Academics ==
Ph.D.; M.Sc.; LL.B.; Prof. in French, Russian, German, Spanish, Diplomas in Journalism, Computer, Yoga (B.H.U.), Management, Police Community Relations.

Member: International Police Association, Research Degree Committee, Ph.D. Examiner, Indian Society of Criminology, Indian Council of World Affairs, Indian Institute of Defence Studies, Authors Guild of India. Former Principal Police Training College; Guest Lecturer Internal Security Academy, B.S.F. Academy, National Police Academy

== Bibliography ==
- Civil insurgency and intelligence operations (1982) New Delhi : Lancers Publishers
- Gitanjali of Rabindra Nath Tagore — As I saw It and Understood It (2006) Lucknow: Film Institute
- Kamayani of Jai Shankar Prasad — As I saw It and Understood It (2006) Lucknow: Film Institute

== Awards ==
- President's Police Medal for Meritorious Services
- `Man of the Year’ Award presented by the Governor of Uttar Pradesh on behalf of National Institute for Personnel Management
