= Shrinivas Khale =

Indian musician (1926–2011)

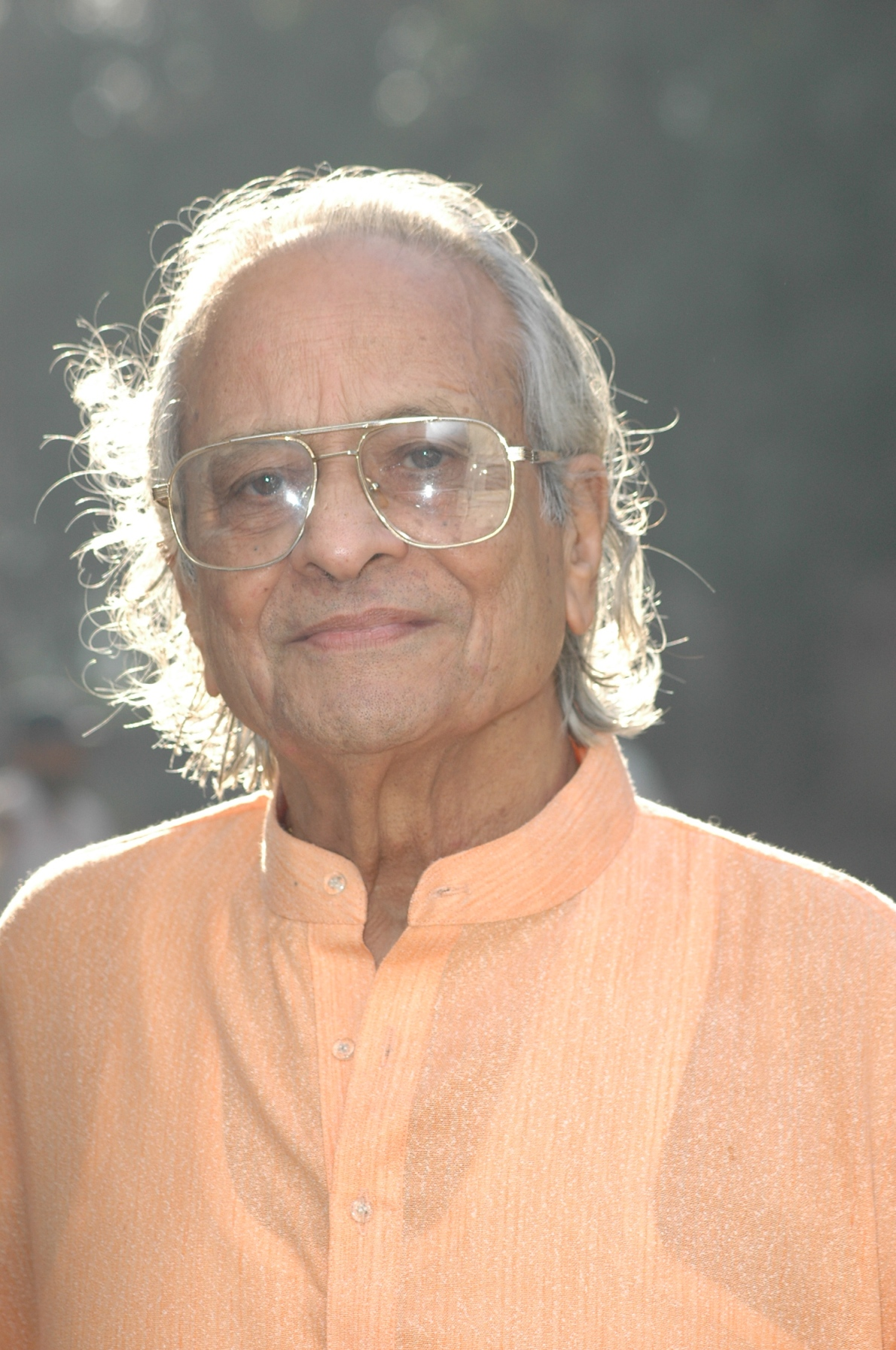

Background information
- Also known as: Khale Kaka
- Born: Shrinivas Vinayak Khale; 30 April 1926; Bombay, Bombay Presidency, British India
- Died: 2 September 2011 (aged 85) Thane, Maharashtra, India
- Genres: Indian classical music
- Occupations: Composer, Music Director
- Instrument: Harmonium
- Years active: 65 years

Shrinivas Vinayak Khale (30 April 1926 – 2 September 2011), fondly addressed as "Khale Kaka", was an Indian composer/music director from Maharashtra, India.

== Early life ==
Khale was born in a Hindu family, having origins from Parali village in Kokan-Raigad zilla, Maharashtra, India. His father was Vinayak Kashinath Khale, and mother was Laxmi Vinayak Khale. His elder brother, Kashinath Khale, influenced his choice of a career in music.

== Career ==
Shrinivas initially studied at the Music College (now the Faculty of Performing Arts of Maharaja Sayajirao University of Baroda) and obtained his Diploma in vocal music. Shrinivas was trained by Madhusudan Joshi of the Agra-Atrauli gharana (school of music).

Although Khale primarily composed music for the Marathi film industry, he composed music in other Indian languages as well: Hindi, Bengali, Gujarati and Sanskrit. He recorded 141 poems and composed music for six Marathi films (Yanda Kartavya Ahe–1956, Bolki Bahauli–1961, Palsala Pane Teen–year not known, Jivhala–1968, Porki–1970, and Sobati–1971; A film Laxmi Pujan–1952 was never released). He also provided music to theatrical plays Paanigrahan, Vidushak and Devache paay during his stint in Akashwani, Mumbai.

In 2008, the Chandraseniya Kayastha Prabhu community organization of Vadodara held a musical program to felicitate Khale after he returned to the city after 30 years. He is the recipient of the Padma Bhushan award in 2010.

On behalf of Hridayesh Arts, an annual award called the Swar Shrinivas Puraskar has been instituted. The first recipient being Kamlesh Bhadkamkar who has spent 12 years as a music composer and has worked closely with Kaka himself.

His last album "Nath Maza Mi Nathancha" was released in September 2009 which includes Abhangas and Bhaktigeet by Saint Krishnadas. Among his disciples is noted music composer and singer Shankar Mahadevan.

== Filmography ==
- Yanda Kartavya Ahe (1956)
- Bolki Bahauli (1961)
- Palsala Pane Teen
- Jivhala (1968)
- Porki (1970)
- Sobati (1971)
- Laxmi Pujan (1952) (unreleased)
- Kalee 2011 (Director: Vaibhav Kulkarni, Incomplete)

== Honors ==
- (2012) Hridayesh Arts by Hridyanath Mangeshkar, Mangesh Padgaonkar, Yeshwant Dev and his disciples (in honor of 1st anniversary)
- (2012) Swar Gandhar Pratisthan and Thane Viraat Samajik & Sanskrutik Manch (in honor of 1st anniversary)
- (2011) Hridayesh Arts by Shri. Sushil Kumar Shinde
- (2010) Shankaracharya, Sawan Kumar Tak (director), Governor of Maharashtra K. Shankarnarayanan at Raj Bhavan, Mumbai
- (2010) BK Bhagat Pratishthan members of Thane
- (2008) Mr. Kumar Ketkar, chief editor of Loksatta (Marathi newspaper) and Hridayesh Arts
- (2006) Dainik Lokmat by Mr Vilasrao Deshmukh
- (2005) Ram Gabale (Marathi film director)
- (2005) Hridayesh Arts by Bharat Ratna Gansamradni Lata Mangeshkar
- (2000) Atharva Pratishthan by Shiv Sena Pramukh Shri Balasaheb Thakrey
- (1995) Suvarna Tabakadi / Golden Disc by Shri Naushad Ali through Hridayesh Arts
- (1993) Shrimati Lata Mangeshkar Puraskar from Governor of Maharashtra P.C.Alexander at Raj Bhavan, Mumbai
- (1991) Swaryatri Samaj Gaurav by Guruprathistan Mumbai on Doordarshan

== Awards ==
- (2006) Zee Chitra Gaurav Lifetime Achievement Award
- (2010) Padma Bhushan Awards (2010–2019)
- (2010) Big Marathi Music Award for "Best Music Director"
- (2009) Sarva Shreshtha Puraskar
- (2008) Swarna Ratna Puraskar and Music Director Datta Davjekar Puraskar
- (2007) Sangeet Ratna Puraskar
- (2007) Worldspace honour for outstanding contribution to Marathi music as Composer
- (2006) Jeevan Gaurav Puraskar
- (2003) Samanvay Pratishthan Puraskar, Sudhir Phadke Puraskar, Bal Gandharva Puraskar
- (2000) Mahalaxmi Puraskar
- (1995) Golden Disc for completing 50 years in field of music
- (1993) Lata Mangeshkar Award
- (1970) Sur Sringar Puraskar
