= G. D. Madgulkar =

Marathi poet, lyricist, writer and actor

G. D. Mādgulkar
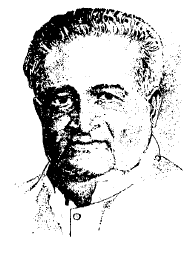
- Ga Di Mādguḷkar
- Born: 1 October 1919; Shetphale in Ātpādi taluka in Sāngli district, India His village is Mādguḷe in Ātpādi
- Died: 14 December 1977 (aged 58)
- Occupations: Poet, lyricist, playwright, script writer, dialog writer, actor, and orator
- Writing career
- Pen name: (GaDiMā)
- Genre: Marāthi
- Notable work: गीतरामायण (Geet Rāmāyana)
- Movement: Marāthi
- Website: gadima.com

Gajānan Digambar Mādguḷkar (1 October 1919 – 14 December 1977, गदिमा ) was a Marāthi poet, lyricist, writer and actor from India. He is popularly known in his home state of Mahārāshtra by just his initials as Ga Di Mā. He was awarded Sangeet Natak Akademi Award in 1951 and Padma Shri in 1969. He wrote 157 screenplays and over 2,000 songs in his career. He was called Ādhunik Valmiki (the modern Valmiki) of current era due to his composition of Geet Rāmāyan (lit. Ramayana in Songs) as the most notable work. 2019 was celebrated as his birth century year. Government of Maharashtra hosts various events and festivals to grace the occasion.

== Career ==
Madgulkar wrote poetry, short stories, novels, autobiographies and scripts, dialogues and lyrics for Marathi as well as Hindi movies. His poems have been adapted to a wide range of musical forms such as Sugam-Sangeet (light music), Bhāwa-Geet (emotional songs), Bhakti-Geet (devotional songs), and Lāwani (a genre of folk songs in Maharashtra). Madgulkar entered the world of movies in 1938 at Kolhāpur. He contributed to 157 Marathi and 23 Hindi movies. He was also an artist. He loved to draw nature scenes.

He had knowledge of 10 languages including Marathi, Hindi, English, Urdu, Bengali, Gujarati, Punjabi, Kannada, Tamil and Telugu.

He was the elder brother of Marathi writer of poetry and novels Vyankatesh Madgulkar.

== Works ==
=== Collections of poems ===
- Sugandhi Veena
- Jogiya
- Char sangitika
- Geet Ramayan
- Kavykatha
- Chaitraban
- Geetgopal
- Geetsaubhadra
- Vaishakhi
- Pooriya
- Ajun Gagima
- Naach re mora

=== Collection of short stories ===
- Laplele ogh
- Bandhavarchya babhali
- Krushnachi karangali
- Bolka shankh
- Veg ani itar katha
- Thorli pati
- Tupacha nandadeep
- Chandani udbatti
- Bhatache phool
- Sone ani mati
- Teen chitrakatha
- Kalavantanche anand paryatan
- Teel ani tandul

=== Autobiographies ===
- Vatevarlya savlya वाटेवरल्या सावल्या
- Mantarlele diwas, मंतरलेले दिवस

=== Novels ===
- De tali ga ghe tali
- Mini
- Shashank manjiri
- Naach re mora
- Tulsi ramayan
- Shabdranjan
- Aakashachi phale
- Ubhe dhage aadve dhage

=== Plays ===
- Aakashachi phale
- Parachakra

=== Monthly magazines ===
- Akshar
- Dharti

==== Geet Ramayan ====
Geet Rāmāyan (lit. Ramayana in Songs) is considered his most notable work. A lyrical version of the Valmiki Ramayana in Marathi, it consists of 56 songs chronologically describing events from Ramayana. Sudhir Phadke composed the music for Geet Ramayan. Though it is based on sage Valmiki's epic Ramayana, Madgulkar chose a different narrative format and was praised for the lyrics, and was called Ādhunik Valmiki (the modern Valmiki).

==== Screenwriting ====
- जीवनज्योती Jeewan Jyoti 1953: Screenplay and Dialogs
- तूफान और दीया Toofān Aur Deeyā 1956: Story
- दो आंखे बारह हाथ Do Ānkhen Bārah Hāth 1957: Story, Screenplay, and Dialogs - the movie won recognition at Berlin International Film Festival.

==== Popular Songs ====
The following is a short list of some of the popular Marathi songs which "गदिमा" wrote:

- इंद्रायणीकाठी देवाची आळंदी (Indrāyani Kāthi Dewāchi Ālandi)
- उद्धवा, अजब तुझे सरकार (Uddhawā, Ajab Tujhze Sarkār)
- तुझ्या उसाला लागल कोल्हा (Tujhyā Usaālā Lāgel Kolhā)
- या चिमण्यानो, परत फिरा रे (Yā Chimanyāno, Parat Phirā Re)
- हे काम ने तडीला, हाजी मलंग बाबा (He Kām Ne Tadilā, Hāji Malang Bābā)
- विठ्ठला,तू वेडा कुंभार (Viththalā, Tu Wedā Kumbhār)

=== Acting ===
Year	Movie	Language	Director	Co-Actors
1938	ब्रह्मचारी (Brahmachari)	Marathi	Master Vinayak	Master Vinayak, Meenakshi Shirodkar, V.G. Jog, Salvi, Damuanna Malvankar, Javdekar, Vasant Eric
1942	पहिला पाळणा (Pahilā Pālnā)	Marathi	Vishrām Bedekar	Shanta Hublikar, Indu Natu, Baburao Pendharkar, Balabhai, Kusum Deshpande, Dinkar Kamanna, Vishnupant Aundhkar
1947	लोकशाहीर रामजोशी (Lokshāhir Rāmjoshi) (Marathi)/ MatwālāShayar Rāmjoshi (Hindi)	Marathi/Hindi	Bāburāo Painter (Marathi Version)	Jayaram Shiledar, Hansa Wadkar, Shakuntala, Parashuram, Sudha Apte, Samant, Gundopant Walawalkar, Jayaram Desai, Kanase, Sawalaram, Vaidya, Abhyankar
1948	बनवासी (Banawāsi)	Hindi	Kumār Chandrasekhar	
1948	अदालत (Adālat)	Hindi	Vasant Joglekar	
1950	पुढचं पाऊल (Pudhche Pāool)	Marathi	Rājā Parānjpe	P.L. Deshpande, Hansa Wadkar, Kusum Deshpande, Vivek, Mohammed Hussain, D. S. Ambapkar, Bal Chitale, Raja Paranjpe, Shakuntala Jadhav, Suman, Ravindra, Baby Neela
1952	लाखाची गोष्ट (Lākhāchi Goshta)	Marathi	Rājā Parānjpe	Chitra, Rekha, Raja Gosavi, Indira Chitnis, Ravindra, Sharad Talwalkar, Raja Paranjpe, Madan Mohan
1952	पेडगावचे शहाणे (Pedagāwache Shahāne)	Marathi	Rājā Parānjpe	Raja Paranjpe, Chittaranjan Kolhatkar, Dhumal, Master Dwarkanath, Vasant Shinde, Nalini Nagpurkar, Nayana, Prasad Sawkar, Sadashiv Thakar, Ganpatrao Kelkar, Daldaseth
1952	जीत (Jeet Kiskee)	Hindi	Vasant Joglekar	
1953	अंमलदार (Ammaladār)	Marathi	K. Nārāyan Kāle	P. L. Deshpande, K. Narayan Kale, Sheila Naik, Leela Ogale, Vinay Kale (Music Composer: G. D. Madgulkar)
1960	जगाच्या पाठीवर (Jagāchyā Pāthiwar)	Marathi	Rājā Parānjpe	Ramesh Deo, Seema Deo, Dhumal, Raja Paranjpe, Mai Bhide, Vinay Kale, Raja Gosavi, Sharad Talwalkar, Raj Dutt, Sudhir Phadke, Anna Joshi

== Awards and recognitions ==
- Sangeet Natak Akademi Award – 1951
- Padma Shri – 1969
- Vishnudas Bhave gold medal -1971

== Personal life ==
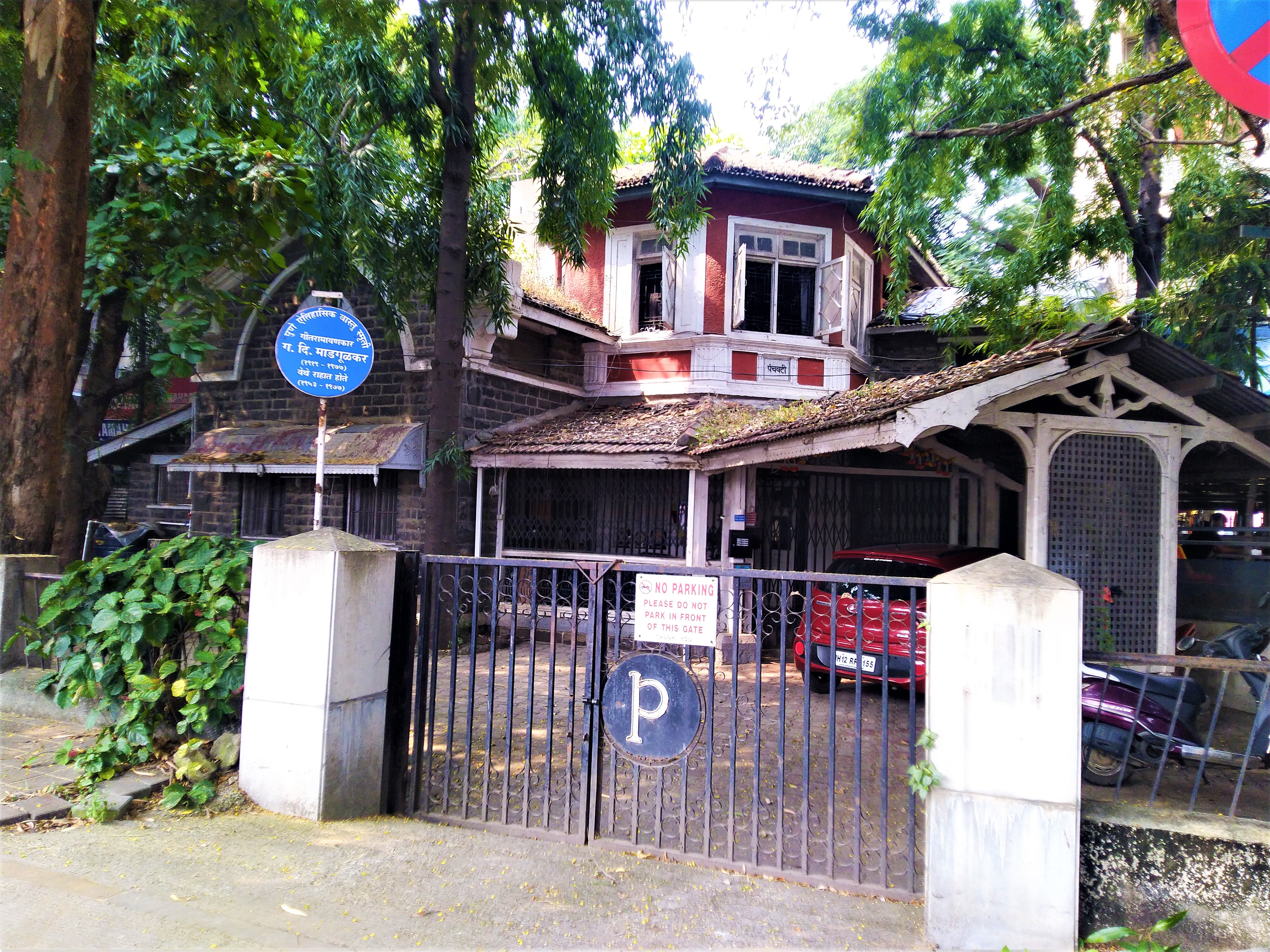
Panchavati - Residence of G. D. Madgulkar in Pune

Madgulkar was born in a Deshastha Brahmin family. He was married to Vidya (née Patankar, from Kolhapur) and they had 3 sons (Shridhar, Anand, Sharatkumar) and 4 daughters (Varsha, Kalpalata, Deepa, Shubhada). The popular Marathi writer, Vyankatesh Madgulkar was his younger brother.

His home in Pune ('Panchavati Bungalow') has become a place of attraction for his fans.

== Additional information ==
A strategically placed mango tree on the Film and Television Institute of India (FTII) campus in Pune serves as a platform for various informal discussions on cinema. G.D. Madgulkar is believed to have given this natural structure the name "Wisdom Tree."
