= Sudhir Phadke =

Indian singer and composer (1919–2002)

- Born: Ram Phadke; 25 July 1919; Kolhapur, Kolhapur State, British India
- Died: 29 July 2002 (aged 83); Mumbai, Maharashtra, India
- Other names: Babuji; Swaragandharva
- Occupations: Singer, Music composer
- Organisation: Rashtriya Swayamsevak Sangh
- Works: Geet Ramayan
- Spouse: Lalita Deulkar (m. 1949)
- Children: Shridhar Phadke
- Awards: National Film Award for Best Feature Film in Marathi (1963); Sangeet Natak Akademi Award (1991); Sahyadri Swara Ratna Puraskar (2002)

Sudhir Phadke (born Ram Phadke; 25 July 1919 – 29 July 2002) was an Indian singer and composer. Popularly known as Babuji, he is regarded as an icon of the Marathi film industry and Marathi Sugama Sangeetha with a legacy spanning five decades. Apart from Marathi, Phadke sang and composed songs in several other Hindi films as well.

== Life ==
Sudhir Phadke was born in Kolhapur on 25 July 1919. His birth name was Ram Vinayak Phadke, but he later changed his name to 'Sudhir' when he composed a song for His Master's Voice. He studied classical music under Vamanrao Padhye in Kolhapur, and wanted to be a classical vocalist. But later he busied himself in lighter forms of music. After beginning his career with His Master's Voice in 1941, he joined the Prabhat Film Company as a music director in 1946. During his long career, he composed music for many Marathi and Hindi films. He was also an immaculate playback singer. He recorded a large number of songs with singer Asha Bhosle; also he plays a vital role in making her career in Marathi film industry. Phadke married fellow singer Lalita Deulkar (1925-2010). Their son Shridhar Phadke (born 1950) is also a composer and singer.

Sitar player Sudhir Phadke (1962-2006) was a different person. He was the son of Sacchidananda Phadke, an eminent sitarist and composer, and his grandfather was Pandit Vaman Rao Phadke. Along with his younger sister, Sandhya Phadke-Apte, he also trained with Annapurna Devi, an eminent surbahar player of the Maihar Gharana. Hear the sitarist here : https://www.youtube.com/watch?v=c5NB3xRUWZI And there was a table tennis player with the same name. His best ranking was world number 35 in 1970s. Table Tennis player Sudhir Phadke passed away in 2018.

Geet Ramayana, based on poet G D Madgulkar's verses, is one of Phadke's most popular works. The programme ran on All India Radio for a year, 1955–56. Stage performances of the program continue to draw huge crowds even today. Phadke set to music all 56 songs, and they were sung by different singers for radio (Manik Varma, Lalita Deulkar, Lata Mangeshkar, Phadke himself, Vasantrao Deshpande, Ram Phatak, Usha Atre). All 56 songs were also recorded in Phadke's own voice.

In his last days of life, Phadke was involved in producing a Hindi film on the life of the Indian freedom fighter Vinayak Damodar Savarkar. The movie Veer Savarkar was funded by public donations. He was also actively involved with Goa Freedom Movement and in post freedom fight of India. Phadke was connected with Rashtriya Swayamsevak Sangh for over 60 years. He was the main inspiration and founder member of India Heritage Foundation in the United States.

== Filmography ==
=== As a composer ===
(Partial filmography)

1. Gokul (1946)
2. Rukmini Swayamvar (1946)
3. Aage Badho (1947)
4. Sita Swayamwar (1948)
5. Jivacha sakha (1948)
6. Sita Swayanwar (1948)
7. Vande Mataram (1948)
8. Aparadhi (1949)
9. Bheem (1949)
10. Maya Baazar (1949)
11. Ram Pratiggya (1949)
12. Sant Janabai (1949)
13. Shri Krishna Darshan (1950)
14. Johar Maibap (1950)
15. Pudhacha Paul (1950)
16. Vanshacha Diva (1950)
17. Jashas Tase (1951)
18. Vithal Rakhmai (1951)
19. Maalti Madhav (1951)
20. Murli Wala (1951)
21. Lakhaci Goshta (1952)
22. May Bahini (1952)
23. Narveer Tanaji (1952)
24. Pratapgad (1952)
25. Bolvita dhani (1953)
26. Kon Kunacha (1953)
27. Kuberacha Dhan (1953)
28. Soubhagya (1953)
29. Vahininchya bangadya (1953)
30. Pehli Taarikh (1954)
31. Ratna Ghar (1954)
32. In meen sade teen (1954)
33. Maharani Yesubai (1954)
34. Un paus (1954)
35. Owalni (1954)
36. Postatil mulgi (1954)
37. Rashmachya Gathi (1954)
38. Shevagyachya Shenga (1955)
39. Ganget ghoda nhala (1955)
40. Mi tulas tuzhya angani (1955)
41. Devghar (1956)
42. Sajni (1956)
43. Andhala magato ek dola (1956)
44. Maza ghar mazi manasa (1956)
45. Devagharcha lena (1957)
46. Gharcha zala thoda (1957)
47. Utavala narad (1957)
48. Gaj Gauri (1958)
49. Gokul Ka Chor (1959)
50. Jagachya pathiwar (1960)
51. Lagnala jato mi (1960)
52. Umaj padel tar (1960)
53. Bhabhi Ki Chudiyan (1961)
54. Adhi kalas mag paya (1961)
55. Kalanka Shobha (1961)
56. Mazi Aai (1961)
57. Nirupama ani parirani (1961)
58. Prapancha (1961)
59. Suwasini (1961)
60. Pyar Ki Jeet (1962)
61. Bhintila kaan astat (1962)
62. Char divas sasuche char divas suneche (1962)
63. Chimnyanchi shala (1962)
64. Gariba gharachi lek (1962)
65. Soniyachi paule (1962)
66. Bayko maheri jate (1963)
67. Ha maza marga ekla (1963)
68. Te maze ghar (1963)
69. Devacha khel (1964)
70. Gurukilli (1966)
71. Sant gora kumbhar (1967)
72. Ekati (1968)
73. Aamhi jaato amuchchya gaava (1968)
74. Aadhar (1969)
75. Dev manus (1970)
76. Dhakti bahin (1970)
77. Mumbaicha jawai (Marathi original of Basu Chatterjee Hindi language film Piya ka ghar) (1970)
78. Zala mahar pandharinath (1970)
79. Daraar (1971 film)
80. Bajiraocha beta (1971)
81. Zep (1971)
82. Lakhat ashi dekhani (1971)
83. Mi hi manus ahe(1971)
84. Anolkhi (1973)
85. Javai vikat ghene ahe (1973)
86. Kartiki(1974)
87. Jyotibacha navas (1975)
88. Ya sukhano ya (1975)
89. Aram haram ahe (1976)
90. Chandra hota sakshila (1978)
91. Dost asava tar asa (1978)
92. Sher Shivaji (1981)
93. Devghar Mar (1981)
94. Aplech dat amplech oth (1982)
95. Thorali Jau(1983)
96. Chorachya manat chandane (1984)
97. Maherchi manasa (1984)
98. Dhakti soon (1986)
99. Pudhacha paul (1986)
100. Sher Shivaji (1987)
101. Reshim gathi (1988)
102. Veer Savarkar (Hindi) (2001)

=== As an actor ===
1. Jagachya Pathivar (1960)

== Popular songs ==
=== Geet Ramayan (Marathi: गीत रामायण) ===
Composed and renditioned 'Geet Ramayan', 56 songs written by Madgulkar. Geet Ramayan, collection of songs is summary of Indian epic of Ramayana in chronological sequence. The first of Geet Ramayan by Sudhir Phadke was broadcast by All India Radio Pune on Friday 1 April 1955 on the day of Raam Navami (celebration of the birth of Lord Ram). From 1 April 1955 for 56 weeks, every Sunday a new song of Geet Ramayana was broadcast. It was one of the most popular programs of that time. Geet Ramayan has been translated in 9 Indian languages Assamese, Bengali, English, Hindi, Kannada, Konkani, Sindhi, Telugu and Oriya.

=== As a composer ===
- Jyoti kalash chalke (Bhabhi Ki Chudiyan), a song based on Raga Deshkar sung by Lata Mangeshkar
- "Pehli Tarikh", sung by Kishor Kumar the song is till date played on Radio Ceylon-Sri Lanka Broadcasting Corporation on 1st of every month.
- Maratha Sphurti Geet the regimental song of Maratha Light Infantry, was composed and arranged for the military band by Sudhir Phadke. The lyrics were written by G. D. Madgulkar.
- Chahiye Ashish Madhav a homage to Second Sarsanghchalak Shri M S Golwalkar of the RSS.

Other major creations of Phadke include: Ashi pakhare yeti, Dev devharyat nahi, Daav mandun mandun modu nako, Vikat ghetla shyam, Tujhe geet gaanyasaathi sur labhu de, Toch chandrama nabhaat.

== Awards ==
Phadke won numerous awards, including:

- National Film Award for Best Feature Film in Marathi at 11th National Film Awards (1963) for Ha Majha Marg Ekla.
- Sangeet Natak Akademi Award in 1991
- V. Shantaram Lifetime Achievement Award in 1994
- Sahyadri Swara Ratna Puraskar in April 2002, an award presented by DD Sahyadri

== Death ==
He died in Mumbai on 29 July 2002 at 10.30 AM after suffering a brain haemorrhage. His body was kept at Veer Savarkar Memorial at Dadar in central Mumbai, where many admirers came to pay their last tributes.

A Flyover which goes over the railway line and Dahisar river in the Mumbai suburb between Borivali and Dahisar connecting east and west was named after him.

Bhandup Village Road in Mumbai suburb of Bhandup (West) was renamed as Sangeetkar Sudhir Phadke Marg by BMC.

== In popular culture ==
Swargandharva Sudhir Phadke is a film based on his life starring Sunil Barve and Mrunmayee Deshpande.
