= List of songs recorded by Asha Bhosle =

Asha Bhosle (Note: Asha Bhosle has been credited variously as Asha, Asha Bhosle, Asha Bhonsale, Asha Bhonsle, Asha Bhonsley, Asha Bhosale and Asha Bhosley. She is often referred to as Ashaji – the Hindi suffix ji denotes respect.) was an Indian playback singer, entrepreneur and occasional actress and television personality who predominantly worked in Indian Cinema. Known for her versatility, she has been described in the media as one of the most influential and successful singers in Hindi Cinema. In her career spanning over eight decades she has recorded songs for films and albums in various Indian languages and received several accolades including two National Film Awards, four BFJA Awards, eighteen Maharashtra State Film Awards, nine Filmfare Awards including a Lifetime Achievement Award and a record seven Filmfare Awards for Best Female Playback Singer (Note: Tied with Alka Yagnik.), in addition to two Grammy nominations. In 2000, she was honoured with the Dadasaheb Phalke Award, India's highest award in the field of cinema. In 2008, she was honoured by the Government of India with the Padma Vibhushan, the second-highest civilian honour of the country. Additionally she holds the Guinness World Record for the most studio recordings - singles. The following is a complete list of her songs in various Indian languages:

== Marathi songs ==
Year	Film	Song	Music director(s)	Lyrics	Co-singer(s)
1951	Amar Bhoopali	"Saanga Mukund Kuni Ha Paahila"	Vasant Desai	Honaji Bala	Panditrao Nagarkar
1951	Amar Bhoopali	"Sundara Mhane Dilbara"	Vasant Desai	Honaji Bala	Panditrao Nagarkar
1952	Lakhachi Gosht	"Dolyat Vaach Mazhya"	Sudhir Phadke	G. D. Madgulkar	Sudhir Phadke
1952	Lakhachi Gosht	"Sang Tu Majha Hoshil Na"	Sudhir Phadke	G. D. Madgulkar	Solo
1952	Lakhachi Gosht	"Eksheel Ka Re Majha"	Sudhir Phadke	G. D. Madgulkar	Solo
1953	Gulacha Ganpati	"Ketkichya Banati"	Purushottam Laxman Deshpande	G. D. Madgulkar	Solo
1953	Gulacha Ganpati	"Wayida Kela"	Purushottam Laxman Deshpande	G. D. Madgulkar	Solo
1953	Gulacha Ganpati	"Hi Kuni Chhedli Taar"	Purushottam Laxman Deshpande	G. D. Madgulkar	Vasantrao Deshpande
1953	Gulacha Ganpati	"Ethach Taka Tambu"	Purushottam Laxman Deshpande	G. D. Madgulkar	Vasantrao Deshpande
1953	Shyamchi Aai	"Aai Mhanoni Koni"	Vasant Desai	Pralhad Keshav Atre	Solo
1953	Devbappa	"Nach Re Mora"	Purushottam Laxman Deshpande	G. D. Madgulkar	Solo
1953	Vahininchya Bangdya	"Don Nayananche Hitguj Zale"	Sudhir Phadke	Shantaram Athavale	Solo
1954	Postatil Mulgi	"Shapath Tula Prema"	Sudhir Phadke	G. D. Madgulkar	Solo
1954	Postatil Mulgi	"Te Majha Ghar"	Sudhir Phadke	G. D. Madgulkar	Solo
1954	Postatil Mulgi	"Phulpakharu"	Sudhir Phadke	G. D. Madgulkar	Solo
1954	Postatil Mulgi	"Panya Tujha Rang Kasa"	Sudhir Phadke	G. D. Madgulkar	Solo
1954	Oon Paaus	"Aavadti Bhari Mala Maze"	Sudhir Phadke	G. D. Madgulkar	Solo
1954	Oon Paaus	"Khedyamadhle Ghare Kaularu"	Sudhir Phadke	G. D. Madgulkar	Solo
1954	Oon Paaus	"Ya Katarveli"	Sudhir Phadke	G. D. Madgulkar	Solo
1954	Oon Paaus	"Wajavi Murli"	Sudhir Phadke	G. D. Madgulkar	Manik Varma
1955	Ganget Ghode Nhale	"Premat Tujhya Me Padle"			
1955	Ganget Ghode Nhale	"Hari Themb Ghe Re"			
1955	Mi Tulas Tuzya Angani	"Uth Uthuni Ratichi Raste"			
1955	Mi Tulas Tuzya Angani	"Eka Payavar Bhaar Thevuni"			
1959	Sangtye Aika	"Bugadi Majhi Sandli Ga"	Vasant Pawar	G. D. Madgulkar	
1959	Sangtye Aika	"Chandra Ugavato"	Vasant Pawar	G. D. Madgulkar	Vitthal Shinde
1959	Sangtye Aika	"Ram Ram Ghya"	Vasant Pawar	G. D. Madgulkar	Solo
1959	Sangtye Aika	"Zhali Bhali Pahat"	Vasant Pawar	G. D. Madgulkar	Solo
1960	Jagachya Pathivar	"Tula Pahate Re"	Sudhir Phadke	G. D. Madgulkar	Solo
1960	Jagachya Pathivar	"Ka Ho Dharila Majvar Rag"	Sudhir Phadke	G. D. Madgulkar	Solo
1960	Jagachya Pathivar	"Bai Mi Vikat Ghetla Shyam"	Sudhir Phadke	G. D. Madgulkar	Sudhir Phadke
1960	Jagachya Pathivar	"Thakle Re Nandalala"	Sudhir Phadke	G. D. Madgulkar	Solo
1961	Manini	"Are Khopya Madhe Khopa"	Vasant Pawar	Bahinabai Chaudhari	Solo
1961	Manini	"Vanvaas Ha Sukhacha"	Vasant Pawar	G. D. Madgulkar	Solo
1961	Manini	"Man Vadhay Vadhay"	Vasant Pawar	Bahinabai Chaudhari	Solo
1961	Prapanch	"Bail Tuze Harnawani"	Sudhir Phadke	G. D. Madgulkar	Solo
1961	Prapanch	"Aala Vasant Dehi"	Sudhir Phadke	G. D. Madgulkar	Solo
1961	Prapanch	"Mi Bheek Magnari"	Sudhir Phadke	G. D. Madgulkar	Solo
1961	Suvasini	"Kaal Me Raghunandan Pahile"	Sudhir Phadke	G. D. Madgulkar	Solo
1961	Suvasini	"Yenar Nath Aata"	Sudhir Phadke	G. D. Madgulkar	Solo
1961	Suvasini	"Kadhi Mi Pahin"	Sudhir Phadke	G. D. Madgulkar	Solo
1961	Vaijayanta	"Tumhi Maza Bajirao"	Vasant Pawar	G. D. Madgulkar	Solo
1961	Vaijayanta	"Sawal Jawab"	Vasant Pawar	G. D. Madgulkar	Shahir Amar Sheikh
1961	Vaijayanta	"Aaj Dise Ka Chandra Gulabi"	Vasant Pawar	G. D. Madgulkar	Vasantrao Deshpande
1961	Vaijayanta	"Raaga Raagane Gela Nighun"	Vasant Pawar	G. D. Madgulkar	Shahir Amar Sheikh
1961	Vaijayanta	"Abhal Fatale"	Vasant Pawar	G. D. Madgulkar	Solo
1961	Vaijayanta	"Ashi Marin Teer"	Vasant Pawar	G. D. Madgulkar	Solo
1961	Vaijayanta	"Sukali Mhanun Vaas Visarte"	Vasant Pawar	G. D. Madgulkar	Madhubala Chawla
1961	Aadhi Kalas Mag Paaya	"Aathavanincha Phulala Mandap"	Sudhir Phadke	G. D. Madgulkar	Solo
1961	Aadhi Kalas Mag Paaya	"Chamelis Aali Phule"	Sudhir Phadke	G. D. Madgulkar	Solo
1962	Ha Maza Marg Ekala	"Ha Maza Marg Ekala"	Sudhir Phadke	Ravindra Bhat	Sudhir Phadke
1962	Rangalya Ratri Asha	"Tumchani Maza Ek Kadha Photo"	Datta Davjekar	Jagdish Khebudkar	Sulochana Chavan, Chota Gandharva
1962	Rangalya Ratri Asha	"Naman Natwara"	Datta Davjekar	Jagdish Khebudkar	Chota Gandharva
1962	Prem Andhale Aste	"Aabhas Rangvita"	Ram Kadam	G. D. Madgulkar	Solo
1962	Prem Andhale Aste	"Sakhe Chal Door Jaau"	Ram Kadam	G. D. Madgulkar	Solo
1963	Molkarin	"Dev Jar Maj Kadhi Bhetla"	Vasant Desai	P. Sawalaram	Solo
1963	Molkarin	"Ekvaar Tari Ram Disava"	Vasant Desai	P. Sawalaram	Solo
1963	Chhota Jawan	"Dhav Dhav Savale Vithai"	Vasant Desai	G. D. Madgulkar	Solo
1963	Chhota Jawan	"Jaan Aahe Aplasi"	Vasant Desai	G. D. Madgulkar	Solo
1963	Chhota Jawan	"Yaal Kadhi Ho Ghari"	Vasant Desai	G. D. Madgulkar	Solo
1963	Te Mazhe Ghar	"Uthi Shrirama Pahat Zali"	Sudhir Phadke	Ravindra Bhatt	Solo
1963	Te Mazhe Ghar	"Divya Divyanchi Jyot"	Sudhir Phadke	Ravindra Bhatt	Solo
1963	Te Mazhe Ghar	"Gharatyat Ekti Mi"	Sudhir Phadke	Ravindra Bhatt	Solo
1964	Pathlaag	"Ya Dolyanchi Don Pakhare"	Datta Davjekar	G. D. Madgulkar	Solo
1964	Pathlaag	"Nako Marus Haak"	Datta Davjekar	G. D. Madgulkar	Solo
1964	Maratha Tituka Melvava	"Reshmachya Reghanni"	Lata Mangeshkar	Shanta Shelke	Solo
1964	Vaat Chuklele Navre	"Daan Deuni Sarvasvache"	Vasant Pawar	Ramchandra Hingane	Solo
1964	Vaishakh Vanava	"Sadi Dilli Shambhar Rupayanchi"	Datta Davjekar	G. D. Madgulkar	Solo
1964	Vaishakh Vanava	"Sasarchya Ghari Aale"	Datta Davjekar	G. D. Madgulkar	Solo
1964	Kay Ho Chamatkar!	"Kashyane Aaj Majhya Dolyat"	Vasant Pawar	G. D. Madgulkar	Solo
1964	Kay Ho Chamatkar!	"Nako Vajvus Pawar"	Vasant Pawar	G. D. Madgulkar	Solo
1965	Laxmi Aali Ghara	"Ughadi Daar Purva Disha"	Datta Davjekar	P. Sawalaram	Solo
1965	Padchhaya	"Bai Mazi Karangali Modali"	Datta Davjekar	G. D. Madgulkar	Solo
1965	Yuge Yuge Me Vaat Pahili	"Yuge Yuge Me Vaat Pahili"	Ram Kadam	G. D. Madgulkar	Solo
1965	Shevatcha Malusara	"Dev Nahi Mandiri"	Datta Davjekar	Jagdish Khebudkar	Solo
1965	Shevatcha Malusara	"Lajale Me Lajale"	Datta Davjekar	Jagdish Khebudkar	Solo
1965	Vavtal	"Wadachya Kathi"	Ram Kadam	Jagdish Khebudkar	Solo
1966	Patlachi Soon	Malhari Maza Malhari	Ram Kadam	Kavi Sanjeev	Solo
1967	Thamb Laxmi Kunku Lavte	"Jay Shramdevi Krupa Karu"	Prabhakar Jog	Jagdish Khebudkar	Solo
1967	Thamb Laxmi Kunku Lavte	"Pyalat Budali Duniya"	Prabhakar Jog	Jagdish Khebudkar	Solo
1967	Madhuchandra	"Madhu Ithe An Chandra Tithe"	N. Dutta	G. D. Madgulkar	Mahendra Kapoor
1967	Madhuchandra	"Ashi Hi Madhuchandrachi Raat"	N. Dutta	G. D. Madgulkar	Solo
1967	Madhuchandra	"Tula Samajle, Mala Samajle"	N. Dutta	G. D. Madgulkar	Solo
1968	Ektee	"Navika Chal Tithe"	Sudhir Phadke	G. D. Madgulkar	Solo
1968	Ektee	"Ek Phulale Phool"	Sudhir Phadke	G. D. Madgulkar	Solo
1968	Jiwhala	"Chanda Rani"	Shrinivas Khale, Anil Mohile	G. D. Madgulkar	Solo
1968	Jiwhala	"Priya Tuj Kaay Dise"	Shrinivas Khale, Anil Mohile	G. D. Madgulkar	Solo
1968	Dhanya Te Santaji Dhanaji	"Shankara Karuna Kara"	Vasant Desai	G. D. Madgulkar	Solo
1968	Dhanya Te Santaji Dhanaji	"Desh Ha Dev Ase Maza"	Vasant Desai	G. D. Madgulkar	Solo
1968	Dharmakanya	"God Gojiri Lajiri Lajar	Hridaynath Mangeshkar	G. D. Madgulkar	Krishna Kalle, Usha Mangeshkar
1968	Dharmakanya	"Purva Dishela"	Hridaynath Mangeshkar	G. D. Madgulkar	Solo
1968	Dharmakanya	"Nandalala Re Nandalala"	Hridaynath Mangeshkar	G. D. Madgulkar	Solo
1968	Dharmakanya	"Paithani Bilagun Mhanate"	Hridaynath Mangeshkar	G. D. Madgulkar	Solo
1968	Dharmakanya	"Sakhi Ga Murali Mohan"	Hridaynath Mangeshkar	G. D. Madgulkar	Solo
1969	Aadhar	"Vara Sute Sukhacha"	Sudhir Phadke	G. D. Madgulkar	Solo
1969	Aadhar	"Majhya Re Priti Phula"	Sudhir Phadke	G. D. Madgulkar	Solo
1969	Aamhi Jato Amuchya Gava	"Swapnat Rangale Mee"	Sudhir Phadke	G. D. Madgulkar	Sudhir Phadke
1969	Aamhi Jato Amuchya Gava	"Me Aaj Phul Jhale"	Sudhir Phadke	G. D. Madgulkar	Solo
1969	Aamhi Jato Amuchya Gava	"Hawas Maj Tu"	Sudhir Phadke	G. D. Madgulkar	Solo
1969	Aamhi Jato Amuchya Gava	"Mala He Dattaguru Disle"	Sudhir Phadke	G. D. Madgulkar	Solo
1969	Aparadh	"Tujhi Prit Aaj Kashi"	Datta Naik	Madhusudan Kalelkar	Solo
1969	Gan Gavlan	"Jugalbandi"	Ram Kadam	Jagdish Khebudkar	Krishna Kalle
1970	Mumbaicha Jawai	"Ka Re Durava"	Sudhir Phadke	G. D. Madgulkar	Solo
1970	Mumbaicha Jawai	"Aaj Kuni Tari Yave"	Sudhir Phadke	G. D. Madgulkar	Solo
1970	Ganane Ghungroo Haravale	"Ghyava Ekach Ghootka"	Shankar Patil	Jagdish Khebudkar	Solo
1970	Ganane Ghungroo Haravale	"Zhombto Garva"	Shankar Patil	Jagdish Khebudkar	Solo
1970	Dhakti Bahin	"Dhundi Kalyana"	Sudhir Phadke	Jagdish Khebudkar	Sudhir Phadke
1970	Dhakti Bahin	"Taalaat Nachat Hasat"	Sudhir Phadke	Jagdish Khebudkar	Solo
1970	Dhakti Bahin	"Sajana Aala Asa Dur Ka"	Sudhir Phadke	Jagdish Khebudkar	Solo
1970	Dhakti Bahin	"Hatamadhi Mogryacha Gajra"	Sudhir Phadke	Jagdish Khebudkar	Solo
1970	Dev Manus	"Pavasat Nhati"	Sudhir Phadke	G. D. Madgulkar	Solo
1970	Dev Manus	"Tyachi Majhi Preet"	Sudhir Phadke	G. D. Madgulkar	Solo
1971	Bajiraocha Beta	"Tipur Tipur"	Sudhir Phadke	G. D. Madgulkar	Solo
1971	Bajiraocha Beta	"He Asech Swapna Rahu De"	Sudhir Phadke	G. D. Madgulkar	Solo
1971	Ashich Ek Ratri Hoti	"Nahi Parva Aata Sakhya"	Ram Kadam	G. D. Madgulkar	Solo
1972	Kunku Maze Bhagyache	"Naav Navticha"	Ram Kadam	Jagdish Khebudkar	Solo
1972	Kunku Maze Bhagyache	"Tumchi Chatak Chandani"	Ram Kadam	Jagdish Khebudkar	Solo
1973	Aandhala Marto Dola	"Majhya Bhavala"	Prabhakar Jog	Jagdish Khebudkar	Solo
1973	Varhadi Ani Vajantri	"Shravan Aala Ga"	Ram Kadam	Jagdish Khebudkar	Solo
1973	Varhadi Ani Vajantri	"Kadhi Tu Disashil"	Ram Kadam	Jagdish Khebudkar	Solo
1973	Anolkhi	"Dhund Ekant Ha"	Sudhir Phadke	G. D. Madgulkar	Solo
1973	Anolkhi	"Amchya Raja Ka Rusla"	Sudhir Phadke	G. D. Madgulkar	Sudhir Phadke
1973	Bholi Bhabdi	"Haat Dabu Naka"	Ram Kadam	G. D. Madgulkar	Solo
1973	Bholi Bhabdi	"Tirki Nazar Nishani"	Ram Kadam	G. D. Madgulkar	Solo
1974	Sugandhi Katta	"Kambar Lachakali"	Ram Kadam	Jagdish Khebudkar	Solo
1974	Sugandhi Katta	"Tilgul Ghya Ho"	Ram Kadam	Jagdish Khebudkar	Solo
1974	Kartiki	"Diwa Barik Kara"	Sudhir Phadke	Jagdish Khebudkar	Solo
1974	Kartiki	"Haat Deoon Mala Savara"	Sudhir Phadke	Jagdish Khebudkar	Solo
1974	Kartiki	"Kashi Bai Jadugari"	Sudhir Phadke	Jagdish Khebudkar	Solo
1975	Ya Sukhano Ya	"Ya Sukhano Ya"	Sudhir Phadke	Jagdish Khebudkar	Solo
1976	Ha Khel Savalyancha	"Gomu Sangtina"	Hridaynath Mangeshkar	Sudhir Moghe	Hemant Kumar
1976	Ha Khel Savalyancha	"Aala Aala Vara"	Hridaynath Mangeshkar	Sudhir Moghe	Anuradha Paudwal
1976	Ha Khel Savalyancha	"Kajal Ratina Odhun Nela"	Hridaynath Mangeshkar	Sudhir Moghe	Solo
1976	Aaram Haram Aahe	"Asel Kothe Rutala Kanta"	Sudhir Phadke	Sudhir Moghe	Solo
1976	Aaram Haram Aahe	"Prem Vedi Radha"	Sudhir Phadke	Sudhir Moghe	Solo
1976	Aaram Haram Aahe	"Gandha Ha Shwas Ha"	Sudhir Phadke	Sudhir Moghe	Solo
1976	Aaram Haram Aahe	"Jashil Kuthe Muli Too"	Sudhir Phadke	Sudhir Moghe	Ravindra Sathe
1977	Bala Gau Kashi Angai	"Dhundit Gau Mastit Rahu"	N. Dutta	Madhusudan Kelkar, Jagdish Khebudkar	Mahendra Kapoor
1977	Bala Gau Kashi Angai	"Are Man Mohana"	N. Dutta	Jagdish Khebudkar	Solo
1977	Bala Gau Kashi Angai	"Sansar Mandate Mi"	N. Dutta	Jagdish Khebudkar	Solo
1977	Jait Re Jait	"Nabh Utaru Aala, Chimba Tharthar Valla"	Hridaynath Mangeshkar	N. D. Mahanor	Solo
1977	Jait Re Jait	"Jambhul Piklya Zaadakhali"	Hridaynath Mangeshkar	N. D. Mahanor	Ravindra Sathe
1977	Jait Re Jait	"Kunya Raajan Raajan"	Hridaynath Mangeshkar	N. D. Mahanor	Smita Patil
1977	Naav Motha Lakshan Khota	"Ya Ravji Basa Bhaoji"	Anil-Arun	Jagdish Khebudkar	Solo
1977	Naav Motha Lakshan Khota	"Nako Re Nandalala"	Anil-Arun	Jagdish Khebudkar	Solo
1977	Naav Motha Lakshan Khota	"Ek Pakhru Manat Bharlay"	Anil-Arun	Jagdish Khebudkar	Solo
1977	Devaki Nandan Gopala	"Tumchya Tondala Kulup"	Ram Kadam	Daddy Deshmukh	Solo
1977	Navra Maza Brahmachari	"Aaj Dupari"	Pandurang Dixit	Ram Ugaonkar	Solo
1977	Navra Maza Brahmachari	"Bhakas Gaavacha, Zhakas Pavhna"	Pandurang Dixit	Ram Ugaonkar	Solo
1978	Chandra Hota Sakshila	"Chandra Aahe Sakshila"	Sudhir Phadke	Jagdish Khebudkar	Sudhir Phadke
1978	Dhakti Mehuni	"Chukvoon Aaj Aale"	Ram Kinkar	Gangadhar Malambre	Solo
1979	Sunbai Oti Bharun Ja	"Suravatichya"	Bal Palsule	M. D. Devkate	Solo
1979	Sinhasan	"Ushakal Hota Hota"	Hridaynath Mangeshkar	Suresh Bhat	Ravindra Sathe
1979	Baeel Veda	"Ravi Kirane Venit Gunphun"	Vishwanath More	Prabhakar Nayak	Solo
1980	Fatakadi	"Kutha Kutha Jaycha Honeymoonla"	Bal Palsule	Jagdish Khebudkar	Solo
1980	Fatakadi	"Aai Mazi Devi Mazi"	Bal Palsule	Jagdish Khebudkar	Solo
1980	Fatakadi	"Dharani Aaichi Maya"	Bal Palsule	Jagdish Khebudkar	Solo
1980	Fatakadi	"Herala Ga Herala"	Bal Palsule	Jagdish Khebudkar	Solo
1980	Fatakadi	"Aali Fatakadi"	Bal Palsule	Jagdish Khebudkar	Solo
1980	Ranpakhare	"Taala Suranchi"	Vishwanath More	Jagdish Khebudkar	Solo
1980	Ranpakhare	"Aabhal Varti Khali Dharti"	Vishwanath More	Jagdish Khebudkar	Solo
1980	Ranpakhare	"Kiti Aale Kiti Gele"	Vishwanath More	Jagdish Khebudkar	Solo
1980	Ranpakhare	"Jeev Jhalay Veda Pisa"	Vishwanath More	Jagdish Khebudkar	Solo
1980	Ranpakhare	"Sur Majha Maaybaap"	Vishwanath More	Jagdish Khebudkar	Solo
1980	Ranpakhare	"Tumcha Naav Gaav Kaay"	Vishwanath More	Jagdish Khebudkar	Solo
1980	Bhalu	"Gandh Phulancha Gela Sangun"	Vishwanath More	P. Savlaram	Suresh Wadkar
1981	Gondhalat Gondhal	"Ha Mangala Ga Mangala"	Vishwanath More	Jagdish Khebudkar	Suresh Wadkar
1981	Gondhalat Gondhal	"Swapnat Sajna Yeshil Ka"	Vishwanath More	Jagdish Khebudkar	Solo
1982	Aaplech Daat, Aaple Oath	"Dhunyacha Dagad Dagdachi Pati"	Sudhir Phadke	Jagdish Khebudkar	Solo
1982	Shapit	"Dis Jatil Dis Yetil"	Sudhir Phadke	Sudhir Moghe	Suresh Wadkar
1982	Shapit	"Dola Asun Baghana"	Sudhir Phadke	Sudhir Moghe	Solo
1982	Shapit	"Man Majha Bhulala Bai"	Sudhir Phadke	Sudhir Moghe	Solo
1983	Laxmichi Paule	"Phite Andharache Jale"	Sudhir Phadke	Sudhir Moghe	Sudhir Phadke
1983	Laxmichi Paule	"Latkyachi Tanhulyachi"	Sudhir Phadke	Sudhir Moghe	Solo
1983	Laxmichi Paule	"Je Hote Have"	Sudhir Phadke	Sudhir Moghe	Solo
1983	Laxmichi Paule	"Majhya Punyaeeche Bal"	Sudhir Phadke	Sudhir Moghe	Solo
1983	Laxmichi Paule	"Naatha Tujhi Me Jahale"	Sudhir Phadke	Sudhir Moghe	Solo
1983	Gupchup Gupchup	"Gupchup Gupchup"	Anil-Arun	Madhusudan Kalelkar	Suresh Wadkar
1984	Bin Kamacha Navra	"Jhunjur Munjur'	Rajendra Vinay	Shantaram Nandgaonkar	Solo
1984	Mahananda	"Maage Ubha Mangesh" (version 1)	Hridaynath Mangeshkar	Shanta Shelke	Solo
1984	Lek Chalali Sasarla	"Lek Chalali Sasarla"	Raamlaxman	Annasaheb Deulgaonkar	Solo
1986	Pudhche Paool	"Ekach Hya Janmi Janu"	Sudhir Phadke	Sudhir Moghe	Solo
1986	Dhakti Soon	Ekati Tujhyavin Rahu Kashi	Sudhir Phadke	Sudhir Moghe	Solo
1986	Dhakti Soon	Saang tu Majhach na	Sudhir Phadke	Sudhir Moghe	Solo
1987	Bhatak Bhavani	"Mala Padliya Bhul"	Vishwanath More	Jagdish Khebudkar	Solo
1987	Bhatak Bhavani	"Ishkacha Bharun Detepala"	Vishwanath More	Jagdish Khebudkar	Solo
1988	Bandiwan Mi Ya Sansari	"Veglya Jagat Ya"	Vishwanath More	Jagdish Khebudkar	Suresh Wadkar
1988	Bandiwan Mi Ya Sansari	"Savaj Gavana"	Vishwanath More	Jagdish Khebudkar	Solo
1989	Hamaal De Dhamaal	"Man Mohana Tu Raja Swapnatla'	Anil Mohile	Vivek Apte	Ravindra Sathe
1989	Kalat Nakalat	"Manat Tujhe Manogat"	Anand Modak	Sudhir Moghe	Solo
1989	Nivdung	"Na Maanoge Toh"	Hridaynath Mangeshkar	Shanta Shelke	Solo
1991	Chaukat Raja	"Ek Jhoka Chuke Kaaljacha Thoka"	Anand Modak	Sudhir Moghe	Solo
1991	Chaukat Raja	"Hey Jeevan Sundar Aahe'	Anand Modak	Sudhir Moghe	Solo
1991	Jeeva Sakha	"Ae Jhipri Ga Baai"	Anil Mohile	Shantaram Nandgaonkar	Suresh Wadkar
1991	Jeeva Sakha	"Are Buddhu Milala"	Anil Mohile	Pravin Davane	Solo
1991	Maherchi Sadi	"Bhavasathi Dhava Karate, Aaee Aambe Jagdambe"	Anil Mohile		Solo
1991	Maherchi Sadi	"Maza Sonul Sonul Maza Chhakula Chhakula"	Anil Mohile		Solo
1992	Ek Hota Vidushak	"Bharala Aabhal"	Anand Modak	Namdeo Dhondo Mahanor	Solo
1992	Ek Hota Vidushak	"Kutha Tumhi Gela Hota Sanga Karbhari"	Anand Modak	Namdeo Dhondo Mahanor	Solo
1992	Ek Hota Vidushak	"Gachch Lakhlakhla"	Anand Modak	Namdeo Dhondo Mahanor	Solo
1992	Ek Hota Vidushak	"Lal Paithani Rang Majhya Cholila"	Anand Modak	Namdeo Dhondo Mahanor	Chandrakant Kale
1992	Ek Hota Vidushak	"Purvi Surya Udayala Ji"	Anand Modak	Namdeo Dhondo Mahanor	Solo
1992	Ek Hota Vidushak	"Bhar Tarunyacha Mala"	Anand Modak	Namdeo Dhondo Mahanor	Ravindra Sathe
1992	Ek Hota Vidushak	"Mee Gatana Geet Tula Ladiwala"	Anand Modak	Namdeo Dhondo Mahanor	Ravindra Sathe
1992	Ek Hota Vidushak	"Kunachi Ga Madi"	Anand Modak	Namdeo Dhondo Mahanor	Solo
1992	Ek Hota Vidushak	"Tumhi Jau Naka"	Anand Modak	Namdeo Dhondo Mahanor	Devaki Pandit
1993	Aapli Mansa	"Nakalta Ase Unn"	Ashok Patki	Saumitra	Suresh Wadkar
1994	Sukhi Sansarachi 12 Sutre	"Saavadhaantechaa Mee Dete Ishaaraa"	R. D. Burman	Saumitra	Solo
1994	Sukhi Sansarachi 12 Sutre	"Rum Jhum Jhun Aikanaa Maajhiyaa"	R. D. Burman	Saumitra	Solo
1994	Sukhi Sansarachi 12 Sutre	"Hekanaa Thodaa Gaavaat"	R. D. Burman	Saumitra	Suresh Wadkar, Chorus
1994	Sukhi Sansarachi 12 Sutre	"Sandhyaavelaa Tujhe Majhe"	R. D. Burman	Saumitra	Suresh Wadkar, Chorus
1994	Sukhi Sansarachi 12 Sutre	"Kunee Naahi Aaspaas Re Priyaa"	R. D. Burman	Saumitra	Suresh Wadkar, Vijay Joshi
1994	Vazir	"Saanj Ye Gokuli"	Shridhar Phadke	Sudhir Moghe	Solo
1995	Aboli	"Tujhya Vatela Ole"	Nishikant Sadaphule	Namdeo Dhondo Mahanor	Solo
1996	Putravati	"Paha Ho Paha"	Shridhar Phadke	Sant Eknath	Solo

=== Non-film songs ===
Year	Album	Song	Music director(s)	Lyrics	Co-singer(s)
1952	Streejanma Hi Tuzhi Kahani	"Devkinche Baal Bai"	Vasant Pawar	G. D. Madgulkar	Solo
1952	Streejanma Hi Tuzhi Kahani	"Haale Dule Panyavari"	Vasant Pawar	G. D. Madgulkar	Solo
1955	Aathavanitil Gaani	"Dhaga Dhaga Akhand Vinuya"	Vasant Prabhu	P. Savalaram	Solo
1955	Aathavanitil Gaani	"Aji Mi Brahma Pahile"	Vasant Prabhu	P. Savalaram	Solo
1955	Aathavanitil Gaani	"Kanthatach Rutalya Taana"	Shrinivas Khale	G. D. Madgulkar	Solo
1955	Aathavanitil Gaani	"Dalita Kandit Abhang"	Vasant Prabhu	P. Savalaram	Solo
1955	Aathavanitil Gaani	"Kay Karu Me Bola"	Vasant Prabhu	P. Savalaram	Solo
1955	Aathavanitil Gaani	"Vithu Maza Lekurwala"	Vasant Prabhu	P. Savalaram	Solo
1955	Aathavanitil Gaani	"Eka Talyat Hoti Badake"	Shrinivas Khale, Anil Mohile	G. D. Madgulkar	Solo
1955	Aathavanitil Gaani	"Too Visaruni Ja"	Yashwant Dev	G. D. Madgulkar	Solo
1963	Alaoukik Gaane	"Naam Gheta Tuze Govind"	Vasant Prabhu	Shanta Shelke	Solo
1963	Alaoukik Gaane	"Radha Gaulan Karite Manthan"	Vasant Prabhu	Shanta Shelke	Solo
1963	Alaoukik Gaane	"Ja Ja Ja Re Nako Bolu"	Vasant Prabhu	Shanta Shelke	Solo
1967	Aawaz Chandanyanche	"Chandanyat Phirtana"	Hridaynath Mangeshkar	Suresh Bhat	Solo
1967	Aawaz Chandanyanche	"Kevhatari Pahate"	Hridaynath Mangeshkar	Suresh Bhat	Solo
1967	Aawaz Chandanyanche	"Samayichya Shubhra Kalya"	Hridaynath Mangeshkar	Suresh Bhat	Solo
1967	Aawaz Chandanyanche	"Gele Dyayche Rahoon"	Hridaynath Mangeshkar	Suresh Bhat	Solo
1967	Aawaz Chandanyanche	"Taroon Aahe Ratra Ajuni"	Hridaynath Mangeshkar	Suresh Bhat	Solo
1981	Evergreen Asha Bhosle Marathi Songs Vol 1	"Soubhagya Lavle Ga"	Ashok Patki	Shantaram Nandgaonkar	Solo
1981	Evergreen Asha Bhosle Marathi Songs Vol 1	"Chala Ga Sai"	Bal Palsule	Shanta Shelke	Solo
1981	Evergreen Asha Bhosle Marathi Songs Vol 1	"Mala Baiko"	Bal Palsule	Chintamani Potdar	Mahendra Kapoor
1981	Evergreen Asha Bhosle Marathi Songs Vol 1	"Majhya Padranch"	Bal Palsule	Chintamani Potdar	Solo
1981	Evergreen Asha Bhosle Marathi Songs Vol 1	"Chandoba Chandoba Bhaglas Ka"	Bhaskar Chandavarkar	G. D. Madgulkar	Varsha Bhosle, Shrikant Bhosle
1981	Evergreen Asha Bhosle Marathi Songs Vol 1	"Dongar Mathi Aale"	Bhaskar Chandavarkar	Shanta Shelke	Solo
1981	Evergreen Asha Bhosle Marathi Songs Vol 1	"Sukhache Hindole"	Bhaskar Chandavarkar	Shanta Shelke	Solo
1981	Evergreen Asha Bhosle Marathi Songs Vol 1	"Gora Mukhada Tujha"	Anil-Arun	Umakant Kanekar	Suresh Wadkar
1981	Evergreen Asha Bhosle Marathi Songs Vol 1	"Mi Majvari Bhulale Bai"	Ram Kadam	Jagdish Khebudkar	Solo
1981	Evergreen Asha Bhosle Marathi Songs Vol 1	"Rachila Ras Gopani"	Bal Palsule	Chintamani Potdar	Solo
1981	Evergreen Asha Bhosle Marathi Songs Vol 1	"Survatichya"	Bal Palsule	Chintamani Potdar	Solo
1981	Evergreen Asha Bhosle Marathi Songs Vol 1	"Sang Maru Tula"	Ashok Patki	Shantaram Nandgaonkar	Solo
1994	Ritu Hirwa	"Ritu Hirwa"	Shridhar Phadke	Shanta Shelke	Solo
1994	Ritu Hirwa	"Jhini Jhini Vaje Been"	Shridhar Phadke	B. B. Borker	Solo
1994	Ritu Hirwa	"Phulale Re Kshan Majhe"	Shridhar Phadke	Nitin Aakhave	Solo
1994	Ritu Hirwa	"Jai Sharade Vagishwari"	Shridhar Phadke	Shanta Shelke	Solo
1994	Ritu Hirwa	"Ghan Rani"	Shridhar Phadke	Shanta Shelke	Solo
1994	Ritu Hirwa	"Majhiya Mana"	Shridhar Phadke	Saumitra	Solo
1994	Ritu Hirwa	"Bhogale Je Dukkha"	Shridhar Phadke	Suresh Bhat	Solo
1994	Ritu Hirwa	"Saanj Ye Gokuli"	Shridhar Phadke	Sudhir Moghe	Solo

== Tamil songs ==
Year	Film	Song	Music director(s)	Lyrics	Co-singer(s)
1987	Enga Ooru Pattukaran	"Shenbagamae"	Ilaiyaraaja	Gangai Amaran	—
1988	Naan Sonnathey Sattam	"Adhikaalai Nera Kanavil"	Ilayaraja	Vaali	S. P. B
1988	Naan Sonnathey Sattam	"Aagayam Boologam"	Ilayaraja	Vaali	
1988	Naan Sonnathey Sattam	"Oru Devathai Vandhadhu"	Ilayaraja	Na. Kamarasan	S. P. B.
1988	Naan Sonnathey Sattam	"Idhu Kadhal Nenjam"	Ilayaraja	Gangai Amaran	
1988	Naan Sonnathey Sattam	"Unnai Suthum"	Ilayaraja	Gangai Amaran	
1988	Naan Sonnathey Sattam	"Kanna Undhan Kaadhal Meera"	Ilayaraja	Gangai Amaran	
1990	Ulagam Pirandhadhu Enakkaga	"Thalli Thalli Pogum Ponnaiya"	R D Burman	Vairamuthu	—
1990	Ulagam Pirandhadhu Enakkaga	"Thiruttu Ponnai Eruttu Velai"	R D Burman	Vairamuthu	S P Balasubrahmanyam
1990	Pudhu Paattu	"Enga Oor Kaadhal Pathi"	Ilayaraja		Ilayaraja
1990	Thangathin Thangam	"Muthu Muthu"	S. A. Rajkumar	S. A. Rajkumar	
1990	Thangathin Thangam	"Sevandhipoo Maalai kattu"	S. A. Rajkumar	S. A. Rajkumar	
1992	Meera	"Pani Vizhum Maalaiyil"	Ilayaraja	Vaali	S. P. Balasubramaniam
1992	Meera	"Oh Butterfly "	Ilaiyaraja		S.P Balasubramaniam
1994	Sethupathi IPS	"Saathu Nada Saathu"	Ilayaraja		
1997	Nerruku Ner	"Engengey"	Deva	Vairamuthu	Hariharan
1997	Iruvar	"Vennila Vennila"	A. R. Rahman	Vaali	
2000	Hey Ram	"Nee Paartha Paarvai"	Ilayaraja	Vaali	Hariharan
2000	Alai Payuthey	"September Madham"	A. R. Rahman	Vairamuthu	Shankar Mahadevan
2005	Chandramukhi	"Konja Neram"	Vidyasagar		Madhu Balakrishnan

== Pakistani songs ==
Year	Film	Song	Music director(s)	Lyrics	Co-singer(s)
1963	Yahudi Ki Larki	"Kall Ki Umeed Peh Yeh Waqt Na Kho, Kya Khabar Kall Yeh Samaa.."	Hafeez Khan	Shevan Rizvi	
1995	Sargam	"Zara Dholki Bajao Gorio"	Adnan Sami	Riaz ur Rehman Saghar	Adnan Sami
1995	Sargam	"Kya hay, yeh uljhan kya hay"	Adnan Sami	Riaz ur Rehman Saghar	Adnan Sami

== Nepali songs ==
Year	Film	Song	Music director(s)	Lyrics	Co-singer(s)
1966	Maitighar	"Ma Pyar Bechidinchu"	Jaidev		
1966	Maitighar	"Yo Ho Mero Pran Bhanda Pyaro Maitighar"	Jaidev		
1988	Mayalu	"Kina Baddaichha Dhukdhuki"	Ranjit Gazmer		
1988	Mayalu	"Ko Hola Mero"	Ranjit Gazmer		
1991	Chino	"Batasale Udai Lyayo"	Ranjit Gazmer		Kumar Kancha
1991	Chino	"Diyo Bali"	Ranjit Gazmer		
1991	Chino	"Maya Ta Maya Ho"	Ranjit Gazmer		Narayan Gopal
1991	Chino	"Mohani Lagla Hai"	Ranjit Gazmer		Narayan Gopal
1993	Koseli	"Timi Mero Ma Timro"	Ranjit Gazmer	Kusum Gajmer	Indrajit Mijar
1995	Prem Pinda	"Gairi Khet Ko"	Sambhujeet Baskota	Yadav Kharel	

== Telugu songs ==
Year	Film	Song	Music director(s)	Lyrics	Co-singer(s)
1981	Paalu Neellu	"Idi Mouna Geetham"	Sathyan		solo
1988	Chinni Krishnudu	"Jeevitham Sapta Sagara"	R D Burman	Veturi	S. P. Balasubrahmanyam
1992	Aswamedham	"Seethakalam Premaku"	Ilaiyaraaja	Veturi	S. P. Balasubramanyam
1992	Aswamedham	"O Prema"	Ilaiyaraaja	Veturi	S. P. Balasubramanyam
1995	Premaku Premante Thelusa	"Jalandhi Madhi"	Usha Khanna		
1996	Pavitra Bandham	"Isaalakidee"	M. M. Keeravani	Sirivennela Seetharamasastri	S. P. Balasubramanyam
1997	Iddaru (D)	"Vennela"	A. R. Rahman		
2007	Chandamama	"Nalo Voohalaku"	K. M. Radha Krishnan	Anantha Sreeram	K. M. Radha Krishnan

== Kannada songs ==
Year	Film	Song	Music director(s)	Lyrics	Co-singer(s)
1967	Kranthiveera Sangolli Rayanna	"Yako Eno"	Laxman Baralekar	-	Solo
1973	Doorada Betta	"Savaalu Haaki Solisi Ellara"	G. K. Venkatesh	Chi. Udaya Shankar	P. B. Sreenivas, Mothi
2010	Mathe Mungaru	"Helade Kaarana"	X. Paulraj	Dwarki Raghava	Solo
2010	Manikya	"Jotegaaranilla" (unreleased)	Veer Samarth	Raghavendra Kamath	

== Gujarati songs ==
Year	Film	Song	Music director(s)	Lyrics	Co-singer(s)
1950	Gadano Bel	Hali Jaye Re Vanzar	Avinash Vyas	Avinash Vyas	A. R. Oza, Chorus
1950	Gadano Bel	Raaj Tari Mehlato"	Avinash Vyas	Avinash Vyas	A. R. Oza, Chorus
1962	Jogidas Khuman	Dhananan Dhananan Goliyu Chhutashe, vir Shurvirona"	Avinash Vyas		
1962	Jogidas Khuman	"Jo Thai Chhe, Ek Gai, Biji Gai, Jo Thai Chhe"	Avinash Vyas		
1962	Jogidas Khuman	"Madhrate bole Mor, Jabaki Nindarthi Jagi, Tya Joyo Nandkishor"	Avinash Vyas		
1962	Jogidas Khuman	"Ker Kanto Vagyo Re, Kanto Jherido"	Avinash Vyas		
1962	Jogidas Khuman	"Ame Re Rabara, Ho O O..."	Avinash Vyas		
1962	Jogidas Khuman	"Aatla Utavada Thavu... Hoke, Bhale Nayno Hu Mara Nachavu"	Avinash Vyas		
1966	Kalapi	Ochhu Pade To Maafi Dai Do"	Avinash Vyas		
1968	Liludi Dharati	"He Dhol Dhamakya"	Gaurang Vyas and Purushottam Upadhyay	Avinash Vyas	Chorus
1971	Jesal Toral	"Ori Ori Aav Gori"	Avinash Vyas		
1973	Ranakdevi	Hey Girivar Girnar, Tara Shikhar Ni Toch Kade"	Avinash Vyas		
1973	Ranakdevi	"Panghat Pani Gaya'ta, Koini Najaru Lagi Amne, Maru Bedlu Khalikham"	Avinash Vyas		
1973	Ranakdevi	"Oodhu To Chundadi Taru Oodhu, Range Ramo Koini Chundadi Kaari (Holi Geet)"	Avinash Vyas		
1973	Ranakdevi	"Aaso Maso Sharad Poonam Ni Raat Jo, Chandaliyo Ugyo Re Sakhi Mara Chowkma"	Avinash Vyas		
1973	Ranakdevi	"Gagan Ghor Thayu, Jone Aada Aave Vaadala"	Avinash Vyas		
1973	Ranakdevi	"Bhajan Ma Bhang Padyo Re Mara Bhai, Achanak Jovai Gai Ek Bai"	Avinash Vyas		
1973	Ranakdevi	"Jai Jai Jai Jagdishwar, Om Har Har Mahadev"	Avinash Vyas		
1976	Daku Rani Ganga	"Bole Milan No Mor"	Dilip Dholakia		Dilip Dholakia
1976	Daku Rani Ganga	"Sanvariyani Unchi Unchi Atari"	Dilip Dholakia		solo
N/A	N/A (Non-film)	"Piyara Ne Pipale Thi"	Avinash Vyas		solo
1976	Vir Mangdavalo	"Tari Vanki Re Paghaldi"	Avinash Vyas	Avinash Vyas	
1976	Vir Mangdavalo	"Aankhiyun Man Gori"	Avinash Vyas	Kavi Daad	Mahendra Kapoor
1976	Vir Mangdavalo	"Ruperi Raatma"	Avinash Vyas	Avinash Vyas	Mahendra Kapoor
1976	Vir Mangdavalo	"Kahun Chhun Re Kanuda (Raas)"	Avinash Vyas	Avinash Vyas	Veljibhai Gajjar, chorus
1976	Vir Mangdavalo	"Suraj Ugta Santani"	Avinash Vyas	Avinash Vyas	Mahendra Kapoor
1976	Vir Mangdavalo	"Aashak Mashuk Samasami (Qawwali)"	Avinash Vyas	Avinash Vyas	Anand Kumar C., Mahendra Kapur
1976	Vir Mangdavalo	"Joshida Mara Josh To Juvone"	Avinash Vyas	Avinash Vyas	
1976	Lakho Phulani (film)	Ek Patan Shern Naar Padamani"	Avinash Vyas	Avinash Vyas	Mahendra Kapoor
1976	Lakho Phulani (film)	Maa Sonanun Paranun"	Avinash Vyas	Avinash Vyas	
1976	Malavpati Munj	Rangilo Fagan No Mahino... Nachi Rahya Chhe Aankhane.."	Avinash Vyas	Avinash Vyas	Manhar

== Punjabi songs ==
=== Non-film songs ===
Year	Album	Song title	Music director	Co-singers
2020	Punjabi Film Hits (CD 2)	"Aa Gayi Rut Saun Di"	Sapan-Jagmohan	solo
2020	Punjabi Film Hits (CD 2)	"Sab Dilwale"	Sapan-Jagmohan	solo
2020	Punjabi Film Hits (CD 2)	"Najran Sek Lai"	Sapan-Jagmohan	solo

== Bhojpuri songs ==
=== Film Songs ===
Year	Film	Song	Music director(s)	Lyrics	Co-singer(s)
1963	Laagi Nahi Chhute Ram	"Munhwase Bola Part1"	Chitragupt	Majrooh Sultanpuri	Manna Dey
1963	Laagi Nahi Chhute Ram	"Munhwase Bola Part-2"	Chitragupt	Majrooh Sultanpuri	Manna Dey
1965	Ayeel Basant Bahar	"Kaga Re Udi Ja Re"	Hemant Kumar	Rammoorti Chaturvedi	
1977	Dangal	"Bada Pareshan"	Nadeem–Shravan	Rajpati Rahi	
1977	Dangal	"More Honthwa Se Nathuniya"	Nadeem–Shravan	Rajpati Rahi	
1977	Dangal	"Phoolwa Ki Beni Se"	Nadeem–Shravan	Rajpati Rahi	
1979	Mai Ka Lal	"Chadhal Jawani"	Nadeem–Shravan	Rajpati Rahi	
1979	Mai Ka Lal	"Aaj Mahafil Mei"	Nadeem–Shravan	Rajpati Rahi	Mahendra Kapoor
1979	Mai Ka Lal	"Hamka Lai Chal"	Nadeem–Shravan	Rajpati Rahi	Mahendra Kapoor
1980	Jaagal Bhag Hamaar	Baoor Ho Gaye Lee Gori	S. N. Tripathi	Rammoorti Chaturvedi	Manna Dey
1981	Saiyan Tore Karan	Bichhua Baaje Tekuliya Hanse	Chitragupt		
1981	Saiyan Tore Karan	Naahi Bisri Suratia	Chitragupt		
1983	Hamar Bhauji	Kaam Nahi Kaaj	Chitragupt	Anjaan	
1983	Hamar Bhauji	Aise Chale Purva	Chitragupt	Anjaan	
1983	Hamar Bhauji	Kaili Bharosa Tohar	Chitragupt	Anjaan	Suresh Wadkar
1983	Hamar Bhauji	Tohke Dulha	Chitragupt	Anjaan	Suresh Wadkar
1984	Bhaiya Dooj	"Lagate Solhavan Achha Bhail"	Chitragupt	Laxman Shahbadi	
1984	Paan Khaye Saiyan Hamaar	Sonvaan Dehiyan	Naushad	Ram Murti Chaturvedi	
1984	Paan Khaye Saiyan Hamaar	Dil Debe Na Hum	Naushad	Ram Murti Chaturvedi	
1984	Paan Khaye Saiyan Hamaar	Jaan Marat Ba Goriya	Naushad	Ram Murti Chaturvedi	Mahendra Kapoor
1984	Thakurayeen	Are Rama Mile Na Jabania	Chand Pardesi		
1985	Piya Ke Gaon	"Hammar Piyawa"	Chitragupt		

=== Non-film songs ===
Year	Album	Song title	Music director	Co-singers
1988	Kajri	"Bina Saawariya Ke Sooni"	Sapan-Jagmohan	solo
1988	Kajri	"Baari Umar Mori"	Sapan-Jagmohan	solo

== Malayalam songs ==
Year	Film	Song	Music director(s)	Lyrics	Co-singer(s)
1977	Sujatha	Swayamvara Subhadina	Ravindra Jain	Mankombu Gopalakrishnan	solo

== Odia songs ==
Year	Film	Song	Music director(s)	Lyrics	Co-singer(s)
1977	Sandhya Taara	"Mun Hajichhi Tuma Aakhire"	Basudeb Rath	Shibabrata Das	

== Konkani songs ==
Year	Film	Song	Music director(s)	Lyrics	Co-singer(s)
1977	Bhuierantlo Munis	"Bhuierantlo Munis"	Chris Perry		

== Assamese songs ==
=== Non-film songs ===
Year	Film	Song	Music director(s)	Lyrics	Co-singer(s)
1988	Priyotoma	"Etiya Tumaloi"			solo
2011	Chayanika	"Bhalke Punor Suwa Ebar"		Bhupen Hazarika	solo
2011	Chayanika	"Chayanika Chayanika"			Bhupen Hazarika
2018	Meghali	"Aaji Rati Je"			solo
2018	Meghali	"Dure Dure"			solo
2018	Meghali	"Ki Je Hoy Gol"			Kumar Sanu
2018	Meghali	"Kobane Xosake"			Kumar Sanu
2018	Meghali	"Najaba Aatori"			solo
2018	Meghali	"O Shyam"			solo
2018	Meghali	"Milonor Madhobi"			Kumar Sanu
2018	Meghali	"O Juli Kowa Tumi"			Kumar Sanu

Film Songs

Year	Film	Song	Composer(s)	Writer(s)	Co-singer(s)
1969	Chikmik Bijuli	"Pokkhiraj Ghura"	Bhupen Hazarika	Bhupen Hazarika	Kishore Kumar, Bhupen Hazarika
1979	Mon Projapoti	"Ei Dhuniya Godhuli Logon"	Bhupen Hazarika	Bhupen Hazarika	Bhupen Hazarika (Dialogues)
1979	Mon Projapoti	"O Obhimoni Bondhu"	Bhupen Hazarika	Bhupen Hazarika	solo

== Bengali songs ==
Year	Film	Song	Music director(s)	Lyrics	Co-singer(s)
1959	Gali Thekey Rajpath	Ke Go Tumi Dakile Amare"	Sudhin Dasgupta		
1970	Rajkumari	Gun Gun Gun Kunje Amar"	R. D. Burman	Gauriprasanna Mazumder	
1970	Rajkumari	Bondho Dwarer Andhakare"	R. D. Burman	Gauriprasanna Mazumder	Kishore Kumar
1970	Rajkumari	"Koto Naari Achhe E Gokule"	R. D. Burman	Gauriprasanna Mazumder	Tanuja, Kishore Kumar
1970	Rajkumari	"Ki Je Bhabi Elomelo"	R. D. Burman	Gauriprasanna Mazumder	
1971	Kuheli	Megher Kole Rod Heseche	Hemanta Mukherjee		
1972	Picnic	Keno Sarbonasher Nesha Dhariye"	Sudhin Dasgupta		
1972	Picnic	"Mon Metechhe Monmoyurir Ki Khelay"	Sudhin Dasgupta		
1972	Jiban Saikate	"Sagor Daake Aay Aay"	Sudhin Dasgupta		
1972	Jiban Saikate	"Raat Ekhono Onek Baaki"	Sudhin Dasgupta		
1974	Amanush	Jodi Hoyi Chor Kanta"	Shyamal Mitra	Gauriprasanna Mazumder	Kishore Kumar
1974	Amanush	"Jani Na Aaj Je Apon"	Shyamal Mitra	Gauriprasanna Mazumder	
1974	Amanush	"Na Na Na Omon Kore"	Shyamal Mitra	Gauriprasanna Mazumder	
1974	Mouchak	Paglaa Gaarod Kothay"	Nachiketa Ghosh		Manna Dey
1974	Mouchak	"Besh Korechi Prem Korechi"	Nachiketa Ghosh		
1977	Ananda Ashram	Valobeshe Dekei Dekhona	Shyamal Mitra		
1977	Ananda Ashram	Amar Shopno Tumi Ogo	Shyamal Mitra		Kishore Kumar
1978	Lal Kothi	Tare Bholano Gelo Na	Sapan Jagmohan	Mukul Datt	
1978	Lal Kothi	Dhole Jete Jete	Sapan Jagmohan	Mukul Datt	Kishore Kumar
1978	Lal Kothi	Ke Jaay Re	Sapan Jagmohan	Mukul Datt	
1978	Bandie	Ke Bole Bijli Shudhu"	Shyamal Mitra	Gauriprasanna Mazumder	
1978	Bandie	Mone Na Rong Lagle"	Shyamal Mitra	Salil Chowdhury	Kishore Kumar
1978	Nishan	Tinak Ta Dhin	Shyamal Mitra		
1981	Anusandhan	"Fulkoili Re Fulkoli"	R. D. Burman	Gouri Prasanna Majumdar	Kishore Kumar
1981	Kalankini Kankabati	O Amar Kandher Anchal"	R. D. Burman		
1981	Kalankini Kankabati	"Aadho Aalo Chhayate"	R. D. Burman		Kishore Kumar
1981	Ogo Bodhu Shundori	Tui Joto Phool"	Bappi Lahiri	Bibhuti Mukherjee	
1981	Ogo Bodhu Shundori	Ei Duk Duk"	Bappi Lahiri	Bibhuti Mukherjee	
1982	Troyee	"Jana Ajana Pathe Cholechhi, Eke Eke Dui, Dui Eke Teen Hoyechhi"	R. D. Burman	Swapan Chakraborty	Kishore Kumar, R. D. Burman
1982	Troyee	"Aaro Kachhakachhi, Aaro Kachhe Eso"	R. D. Burman	Swapan Chakraborty	Kishore Kumar
1982	Troyee	"Ektu Bosho, Chole Jeyo Na"	R. D. Burman	Swapan Chakraborty	
1982	Troyee	"Katha Hoyechhilo"	R. D. Burman	Swapan Chakraborty	
1983	Karate	Yeh Salaam Aakhri"	Bappi Lahiri		
1983	Karate	"Baazi Pyar Ki"	Bappi Lahiri		
1986	Amar Kantak	Andhakare Aalo Dite"	Ajoy Das		
1986	Amar Kantak	"Rooper Ei Jadute"	Ajoy Das		
1986	Amar Kantak	"Chokher Janla Khule"	Ajoy Das		
1987	Amar Sangee	Chirodini Tumi Je Amar (Female)	Bappi Lahiri	Pulak Bandyopadhyay	
1987	Amar Sangee	"Ami Mon Diyechhi"	Bappi Lahiri	Pulak Bandyopadhyay	
1987	Amar Sangee	"Amar Ichchhe Korchhe"	Bappi Lahiri	Pulak Bandyopadhyay	Bappi Lahiri
1987	Amar Sangee	"Jekhanei Thako Shukhe Theko"	Bappi Lahiri	Pulak Bandyopadhyay	
1987	Guru Dakshina	Aakasher Chand Matir Bukute"	Bappi Lahiri		
1987	Guru Dakshina	Phool Keno Laal Hoy"	Bappi Lahiri		
1988	Jyoti	Mon Fagun Ke Chunte Chaye	Sapan-Jagmohan		
1988	Jyoti	Chhotto Ekta Bhalobasa	Sapan-Jagmohan		
1988	Chhoto Bou	Jeeboner Saar Tumi"	Sapan Chakraborty		
1988	Chhoto Bou	Shono Shono Aaj Keno Mon Kore Gungun"	Sapan Chakraborty		Mohammed Aziz
1989	Asha O Bhalobasha	"Beshi Ki Boli"	Bappi Lahiri		Bappi Lahiri
1989	Asha O Bhalobasha	Paharer Jongole Ek"	Bappi Lahiri		
1989	Mangaldeep	Pran Aaj Gaan Geye Sukh Pete Chay"	Bappi Lahiri		Amit Kumar
1990	Badnam	Chokhe Chokhe Chokhe Chokhe Kotha Holo"	Bappi Lahiri	Pulak Bandopadhyay	Kumar Sanu
1990	Apan Amar Apan	Mon Bolchhe" - 1 Asha Bhosle	R.D. Burman		
1990	Apan Amar Apan	"Mon Bolchhe" - 2	R.D. Burman		
1990	Apan Amar Apan	"Gun Gun Gun Gun"	R.D. Burman		
1990	Dushman	Ae Jhil Mil Jhil Mil	R.D. Burman		Amit Kumar
1991	Katha Dilam	"Katha Dilam"	Ajoy Das		
1992	Apan Por	"Aamar Garbo Shudhu Ei"	Bappi Lahiri		
1992	Purushottam	Tumi Ele"	R.D. Burman		Saikat Mitra
1992	Purushottam	"Ki Laabh Hobe"	R.D. Burman		Jolly Mukherjee
1992	Purushottam	"Aaj Andhakar"	R.D. Burman		
1994	Tumi Je Aamar	Dujone Bhabini Kono Din"	Babul Bose		
1994	Tumi Je Aamar	"Tururu Turu Ruru"	Babul Bose		Kumar Sanu
1994	Tumi Je Aamar	"Chokhta Bhalo, Mukhta Bhalo"	Babul Bose		Kumar Sanu
1995	Sangharsha	Ki Moja"	Bappi Lahiri		
1995	Sangharsha	"Ki Moja" (Sad)	Bappi Lahiri		
1995	Sangharsha	"Prem Korechhi"	Bappi Lahiri		Bappi Lahiri
1997	Mittir Barir Chhoto Bou	Mon Je Aamar Mayur Holo	Anupam Dutta		
1998	Meyerao Manush	Ektukhani Thakle Sathe Dos Ki	Bappi Lahiri		
1998	Meyerao Manush	Hazar Joner Majhe Ekjoni Tumi	Bappi Lahiri		Kumar Sanu
2009	Rajdrohi	Pagla Jhoro Hawa"	Babul Bose		Vinod Rathod

== Sinhala songs ==
=== Non-film songs ===
Year	Album	Song	Music director(s)	Lyrics	Co-singer(s)
2010	Sara Sihina	"Dedduna Sedi"	Vishardha Sri Shyamalangan	Nilar N. Cassim	Bathiya and Santhush
