= Verardi =

Verardi is a surname. Notable people with the surname include:

- Giovanni Verardi (born 1947), Italian archaeologist
- Verdiana Verardi (born 1987), Italian tennis player
