= Buddhism and Gnosticism =

Buddhologist Edward Conze (1966) has proposed that similarities existed between Buddhism and Gnosticism, a term deriving from the name Gnostics, which was given to a number of Christian sects. To the extent that Buddha taught the existence of evil inclinations that remain unconquered, or that require special spiritual knowledge to conquer, Buddhism has also qualified as Gnostic.

== Edward Conze ==
Edward Conze claimed to have noted phenomenological commonalities between Mahayana Buddhism and Gnosticism, in his paper Buddhism and Gnosis, following an early suggestion by Isaac Jacob Schmidt. (Note: The paper was presented at the conference Origins of gnosticism: colloquium of Messina, held 13–18 April 1966. Conze: "The topic of my paper has a fairly long ancestry. Already in 1828 Isaac Jacob Schmidt, a German living in Russia, published a pamphlet entitled Über die Verwandtschaft der gnostisch-theosophischen Lehren mit den Religionssystemen des Orients, vorzüglich dem Buddhaismus." ("About the relationship of Gnostic theosophical teachings with religious systems of the East, especially Buddhism").) Conze explicitly compared Mahayana Buddhism with "gnosis," that is, knowledge or insight, and not with the Gnostics, because too little was known about the Gnostics as a social group. Based on Conze's eight similarities, Stephan A. Hoeller gives the following list of similarities:

- Liberation or salvation can be achieved by a liberating insight, namely gnosis or jnana
- Ignorance, or a lack of insight, called agnosis or avidyā, is the root cause of entrapment in this world
- Liberating insight can be achieved by interior revelation, not by external knowledge
- Both systems give a hierarchical ordering of spiritual attainment, from blind materialism to complete spiritual attainment
- Wisdom, as the feminine principle personified in Sophia and prajna, plays an important role in both religions
- Myth is preferred over historical fact; Christ and Buddha are not mere historical figures, but archetypal primordial beings
- Both systems have antinomian tendencies, that is, a disregard for rules and social conventions in higher spiritual attainment
- Both systems are intended for spiritual elites, not for the masses, and have hidden meanings and teachings
- Both systems are monistic, aiming at a metaphysical oneness beyond the multiplicity of the phenomenal world

According to Conze, these commonalities were not by chance, but inherent to the essence of both religions. How these similarities came into existence was unclear for Conze, but according to Verardi they may be related to the sea trade between the Roman Empire and India, which was intense at the time. Verardi further notes the similarities between the social-economic base of both Gnosticism and Buddhism, namely merchants, which both had to compete with the "great organised powers," of Rome and the Christian Church, and of the Brahmans. Both communities represented "an open economy and society lacking the defenses (and the vexations) of nomos," the law and institutions of the establishment.

Conze's suggestions were noted by Elaine Pagels as a "possibility," in the introduction to The Gnostic Gospels, (Note: Bennett: "Pagels does not rule out Buddhist and Hindu influence on the Gnostic corpus. She cites the eminent Buddhologist Edward Conze (1904-79): 'Buddhists were in contact with Thomas Christians (that is, Christians who knew and used such.'") but Pagels' and Conze's suggestion has not gained academic acceptance or generated significant further study.

== Manichaeism ==
=== Influences from Buddhism ===
Manichaeism was directly influenced by Buddhism. Like Buddha, Mani aimed for nirvana and used this word, showing the significance of Buddhist influences. He further believed in the transmigration of souls, sangha, and used various Buddhist terms in his teachings. Mircea Eliade noted similarities in the symbolism of light and mystic knowledge, predating Manichaeism, and possibly going back to an early common Indo-Iranian source. Mani considered himself to be a reincarnation of Buddha. He also claimed that he was preaching the same message of Buddha. Giovanni Verardi notes that Manichaeism is the prime source for comparisons between Buddhism and Gnosticism, Manichaeism representing "the same urban and mercantile ambience of which Buddhism was an expression in India." When the mercantile economy declined due to the decline of the Roman Empire, Manichaeism lost its support. The Manichaeans were hostile to the closed society of farming and landownership, just like Buddhism conflicted with the "non-urban world controlled by Brahman laymen." (Note: Note that Buddhism declined in India after the end of the Gupta Empire (c. 320–650 CE), which was related to the decline of the Roman Empire and the decline of sea trade with the Romans. Power was decentralised in India, and Buddhism lost its support from royal courts, being replaced by Brahmanical Hinduism.)

Mani, an Arsacid Persian by birth, was born 216 AD in Mesopotamia (modern Iraq), then within the Persian Sassanid Empire. According to the Cologne Mani-Codex, Mani's parents were members of the Jewish Christian Gnostic sect known as the Elcesaites.

Mani believed that the teachings of Buddha, Zoroaster, and Jesus were incomplete, and that his revelations were for the entire world, calling his teachings the "Religion of Light." Following Mani's travels to the Kushan Empire (Note: Several religious paintings in Bamiyan are attributed to him.) at the beginning of his proselytizing career, various Buddhist influences seem to have permeated Manichaeism:

Buddhist influences were significant in the formation of Mani's religious thought. The transmigration of souls became a Manichaean belief, and the quadripartite structure of the Manichaean community, divided between male and female monks (the "elect") and lay followers (the "hearers") who supported them, appears to be based on that of the Buddhist sangha.

According to Willis Barnstone and Marvin Meyer, evidence of the influence of Buddhist thought on the teachings of Mani can be found throughout texts related to Mani. In the story of the death of Mani, the Buddhist term nirvana is used:

It was a day of pain
and a time of sorrow
when the messenger of light
entered death
when he entered complete Nirvana.

=== Influences on Buddhism ===
Following the introduction of Manichaeism to China, Manichaeans in China adopted a syncretic, sinified vocabulary borrowed primarily from Chinese Buddhism. Between 9th and 14th-centuries, following centuries of pressure to assimilate and persecution by successive Chinese dynasties, Chinese Manichaeans increasingly involved themselves with the Pure Land school of Mahayana Buddhism in southern China, practicing together so closely alongside the Mahayana Buddhists that over the years Manichaeism came to be absorbed into the Pure Land school making the two traditions indistinguishable. Through this close interaction, Manichaeism had profound influence on Chinese Maitreyan Buddhist sects such as the White Lotus Sect.

== Bibliography ==
- Ball, Warwick (2001). Rome in the East: the transformation of an empire. Routledge. p. 437.
- Barnstone, Willis; Meyer, Marvin W. (2005). The Gnostic Bible.
- Bennett, Clinton (2001). In search of Jesus: insider and outsider images.
- Boyce, Mary (2001). Zoroastrians: their religious beliefs and practices. Routledge. p. 111.
- Conze, Edward (1967). "Buddhism and Gnosis". In Bianchi, U. (ed.). Origins of Gnosticism: Colloquium of Messina, 13–18 April 1966.
- Coyle, John Kevin (2009). Manichaeism and Its Legacy. BRILL. ISBN 978-90-04-17574-7.
- Pagels, Elaine H. (1979). The Gnostic Gospels. Random House. ISBN 978-0-394-74043-0.
- Foltz, Richard (2010). Religions of the Silk Road (2 ed.). Palgrave Macmillan. ISBN 978-0-230-62125-1.
- Hoeller, Stephan A. (2012). Gnosticism: New Light on the Ancient Tradition of Inner Knowing. Quest Books.
- Koenen, L.; Römer, C., eds. (1988). "Der Kölner Mani-Kodex. Über das Werden seines Leibes". Papyrologica Coloniensia (in German). 14 (Critical ed.). Abhandlung der Reinisch-Westfälischen Akademie der Wissenschaften.
- Ma, Xisha; Meng, Huiying (2011). Popular Religion and Shamanism. Brill. ISBN 978-9004174559.
- Michaels, Axel (2004). Hinduism. Past and present. Princeton, New Jersey: Princeton University Press.
- Verardi, Giovanni (1997). "The Buddhists, the Gnostics and the Antinomistic Society, or the Arabian Sea in the First Century AD" (PDF). AION. 57 (3/4): 324–346.
- Werner, Sundermann (20 July 2009). "Mani". Encyclopaedia Iranica.
- Yar, Char (2012). Monijiao (Manichaeism) in China (Speech). Lecture presented at the Worldwide Conference for Historical Research. academia.edu. Beijing.
