= Anshuman =

Anshuman is a given name and surname of Indian origin. People with that name included

== Surname ==
- Karan Anshuman (born 1980), Indian film writer, director, and producer

== Given name ==
- Anshuman Bhagawati (born 1978), Indian cricketer
- Anshuman Gaekwad (1952–2024), Indian cricketer and coach
- Anshuman Gaur (born 1974), Indian civil servant
- Anshuman Gautam (born 1994), Indian cricketer
- Anshuman Jha (born 1986), Indian film and theatre actor
- Anshuman Joshi (born 1996), Indian actor in Marathi cinema
- Anshuman Mohanty (born 1986), Indian politician, engineer, entrepreneur and former information technician
- Anshuman Nandi (born c. 2008), Indian drummer and child actor
- Anshuman Pandey (born 1975), Indian cricketer
- Anshuman Rath (born 1997), Hong Kong cricketer
- Anshuman Singh (politician) (1935–2021), Indian judge and state governor
- Anshuman Singh (cricketer) (born 1999), Indian cricketer
- Anshuman Tiwari (born 1974), Indian journalist and editor
- Anshuman Vichare (born 1975), Indian actor, director, producer and television personality

== See also ==
- Anshuman (disambiguation)
