= Anshuman (disambiguation) =

Anshuman is a given name and surname of Indian origin.

Anshuman could also refer to:

- Master Anshuman, a 2023 Bengali children's drama film directed by Sagnik Chatterjee
- Angshuman MBA, a 2023 Bengali language film directed by Sudeshna Roy and Abhijit Guha
