= Prabhakar Jog =

Indian violinist (1932–2021)

- Born: 25 December 1932; Haregaon, British India
- Died: 31 October 2021 (aged 88); Pune, Maharashtra, India
- Occupations: Violinist, music director and composer
- Spouse: Neela Jog
- Awards: Lata Mangeshkar Award
- Website: www.prabhakarjog.in

Prabhakar Jog (25 December 1932 — 31 October 2021) was a noted Indian violinist, music director and composer, who worked in Hindi and Marathi film industry. His critically acclaimed works were the Geet Ramayana series with Sudhir Phadke. He was also known for his stage shows, notably Swar Aale Duruni, Gaanare Violin and Gata Rahe Mera Violin.

== Biography ==
Prabhakar Jog was born in Haregaon, Maharashtra, on December 25, 1932. He got interested in music in his childhood. For around five years, he was trained in classical vocal from Pandit Gajananrao Joshi and Pandit Narayanrao Marulkar.

He performed in more than 80 solo events as part of Ganare Violin. He worked for the Marathi and Hindi film industry and was a part of All India Radio (AIR), Pune. He worked with many music directors, including S. D. Burman, Laxmikant–Pyarelal, Shankar–Jaikishan, Nadeem–Shravan and Anu Malik. He has released 12 music albums.

As a music director, his first song was Lapvilpas Tu Hirva Chafa, which was broadcast on Akashwani (All India Radio) and the song was sung by his wife Neela Jog. Lapvilpas Tu Hirva Chafa is one of the popular Marathi songs. He made his first debut as a violinist with the Marathi film called Shri Gurudev Datta.

== Accolades ==
In 2015, the State Government of Maharashtra awarded him with the Lata Mangeshkar Award for Lifetime Achievement for his contribution to music. The award carries a cash prize of ₹5 lakh rupees, a citation, a shawl and a trophy.

He was awarded the 2019 Zee Chitra Gaurav 2019 Lifetime Achievement Award by Zee Marathi.

== Death ==
On October 31, 2021, Prabhakar Jog died at his residence at Sahakar Nagar in Pune. He was 88 years old.

The Chief Minister of Maharashtra, Uddhav Thackeray, said, “The singing violin goes silent. The music field has lost a true sadhak, while Maharashtra state governor Bhagat Singh Koshyari expressed his deep condolence by tweeting, “Deeply saddened by the news of the demise of renowned violinist and musician Prabhakar Jog. He enriched the world of art with his melodious renditions.” Lata Mangeshkar also paid tribute to him over Twitter.
