= Rajdrohi (2009 film) =

Rajdrohi : Fight Against The System
- Theatrical Poster
- Directed by: Tapan Banerjee
- Written by: Avik Banerjee
- Screenplay by: Tapan Banerjee
- Produced by: Rajkumar Tiwari, Sadhna Movies
- Starring: Anshuman, Swati, Manali
- Edited by: Swapan Guha
- Music by: Babul Bose
- Release date: 25 December 2009
- Country: India
- Language: Bengali

Rajdrohi : Fight Against The System is a 2009 Science fiction Bengali film directed by Tapan Banerjee. This is sixth directorial film after 2007 "Prem". The film stars Anshuman, Swati, Manali and Rajatava Dutta. This film was slated to release on 25 December 2009 and is the first science fiction film of its kind in Bengali till date. The film deals with invisibility of human being and is similar to H. G. Wells' The Invisible Man.

== Synopsis ==
A laboratory test on Deep makes him invisible, so he searches for his father who invented the antidote and discovers many secrets.

== Cast ==
- Anshuman
- Swati
- Manali Chakravarty Aaina
- Arun Banerjee
- Rajatava Dutta
- Amit Daw

== Production ==
It was fall 2008 when the story was proposed by Avik Banerjee to director Tapan Banerjee about a man who falls in a dilemma after getting invisible. The story however was in a short form which was later worked on to make a film on it. Due to high budget and "not so contemporary" storyline, many producers stepped back from the project. It was the start of 2009 when Rajkumar Tiwari decided to make a film on the story which impressed him as being a science fiction fan.

The film started on 27 April 2009 with almost a new cast. During shooting, everyone on the floor was not able to adjust with the special effects and stumbled on their natural acting. But eventually the cast became habituated.

The film was completed at various location of Kolkata and Vizag. The Director Tapan Banerjee's 6th.Film Rajdrohi.

- Jai Ma Hangeswari year 1980
- Prem Pratidan Year 2001
- Idiot year 2004
- Nari Year 2005
- Prem Year 2007
- Rajdrohi Year 2009

== Music ==
Songs are composed by Babul Bose and music will be released on Saregama. Asha Bhosle has sung in this film after a break of 15 years.

- "Pagla Jhoro Hawa" – Asha Bhosle, Vinod Rathod
