= Vasant Prabhu =

Music Composer (1924–1968)

Vasant Prabhu (19 January 1924 – 13 October 1968) was a music composer from Maharashtra who was a prolific composer of nonfilm Marathi songs known as 'bhaav-geete', and also worked in Marathi film industry. A vast majority of his songs were sung by the Mangeshkar sisters. Lyricist P. Savlaram had a long association with him. Lata Mangeshkar + Vasant Prabhu + P Savlaram was a troika behind many film and non-film songs in Marathi Prabhu was also a choreographer.

== Biography ==
Vasant Prabhu acted in a few films under National Studios banner around 1939 as a child artiste, under the name Master Vasant. In the film Comrades (1939), he was one of the voices in the chorus and on the screen for the song 'wo chamak chamak kar taare' under the music direction of Anil Biswas.

Prabhu was a trained dancer having learned Katthak in his childhood. Along with dance, he also had basic knowledge of music and beats. He tried his luck in grabbing in a role as an actor in Marathi films which were then produced in Pune and Kolhapur. He finally got a break when His Master's Voice signed him for the Marathi film Ram Ram Paavhna where he composed few songs and also choreographed them. The success of his non-film song, 'गंगा यमुना डोळ्यात उभ्या का', gave him and Lata a big break in the early years of their careers. He later composed music for the film Vaadal which was produced under the banner "Surel Chitra" by Lata Mangeshkar. Lata herself sang several songs in the film. Prabhu choreographed actress Sulochana Latkar for the film Taaraka directed by Dinkar D. Patil.

Prabhu went on to pair with singers Lata Mangeshkar and Asha Bhosle, and with lyricist P. Swalaram in various further projects, notable being the films Kanyadaan and 'Bayakocha Bhau'. He also was composer of the songs "kalpavruksha kanyesathi" (a tribute to Lata's father Dinanath), "Jo Aawdto Sarwala" and "Aali Hasat Pahili Raat" penned by Sawlaram which became popular. For another film Bhairavi of Dinkar Patil, Prabhu's songs were sung by Pandit Firoz Dastur and Dashrath Pujari. For the film Putra Vhava Aisa, Talat Mahmood sang two songs for the first time in Marathi. Mahmood was popular for his ghazals in Hindi cinema. Vasant Prabhu composed music for one Hindi film named Gharbaar in 1953.

Prabhu's biography in Marathi has been written by Madhu Potdar and published by Manjul Prakashan under the name "Manasicha Chitrakaar To", which is also a song he composed. In October 2008, Soham Pratishthan and Anubodh organized a show "Swarprabhu - Vasant Prabhu" in his memory at Vile Parle, Mumbai.

== Discography ==
Song	Film	Singer(s)	Lyricist	Notes
"Aai Kuna Mhanu Mi"	Putra Vhava Aisa	Asha Bhosale	P. Sawlaram	
"Aali Diwali Aali Diwali"	Baykocha Bhau	Asha Bhosale	P. Sawlaram	
"Aali Hasat Pahili Raat"	Shikleli Bayko	Lata Mangeshkar	P. Sawlaram	Raag Hansadhwani
"Anaam Veera Jithe Jahala"		Lata Mangeshkar	Kusumagraj	
"Apure Majhe Swapna Rahile"		Asha Bhosale	P. Sawlaram	
"Asa Mi Kay Gunha Kela"		Asha Bhosale	Ramesh Anaavkar	Raag Pahadi
"Chafa Bolena"		Lata Mangeshkar	Kavi 'B'	Raag Yaman
"Ga Re Kokila Ga"	Baykocha Bhau	Asha Bhosale	P. Sawlaram	Raag Hameer, Kedar
"Galyat Majhya Tuch"		Asha Bhosle	P. Sawlaram	
"Ganga Jamuna Dolyat Ubhya"		Lata Mangeshkar	P. Sawlaram	
"Gharat Hasre Tare Asata"		Lata Mangeshkar	Datta V. Keskar	
"Gharoghari Vadhadin"		Lata Mangeshkar	P. Sawlaram	
"Ghat Doivar Ghat"		Lata Mangeshkar	P. Sawlaram	
"God Tujhya Tya Swapnamadhli"	Gruhadevta	Lata Mangeshkar	P. Sawlaram	
"Ka Chinta Karisi"	Shikleli Bayko	Hridaynath Mangeshkar	P. Sawlaram	
"Kaay Karu Mi Bola"		Asha Bhosale	P. Sawlaram	
"Kala Jyaa Lagalya Jeeva"		Lata Mangeshkar	Bha. Ra. Tambe	
"Kalekalene Chandra Vadhato"		Mohantara Ajinkya	P. Sawlaram	
"Kalpavruksha Kanyesathi"		Lata Mangeshkar	P. Sawlaram	Raag Pahadi
"Kokil Kuhukuhu Bole"	Kanyadaan	Lata Mangeshkar	P. Sawlaram	
"Krishna Milali Koynela"		Lata Mangeshkar	P. Sawlaram	
"Kuberacha Dhan Majhya Shetat"	Shikleli Bayko	Usha Mangeshkar, Hridaynath Mangeshkar	P. Sawlaram	
"Olakha Pahili Gali Hasate"		Asha Bhosale	P. Sawlaram	
"Rimzhim Paaus Pade Sarkha"		Lata Mangeshkar	P. Sawlaram	
"Utha Utha Sakal Jan"	Traditional song	Asha Bhosale	–	
"Uthi Govinda Uthi Gopala"		Asha Bhosale	P. Sawlaram	Raag Bhoop, Deshkar
