= Giovanni Verardi =

Italian archaeologist

- Born: Giovanni Verardi; 6 September 1947; San Pietro in Casale, Bologna, Italy
- Citizenship: Italian
- Occupation: Professor

Giovanni Verardi (born 1947) is an Italian archaeologist specialising in the civilisations of central Asia and India. He has published findings about sites in Afghanistan, Nepal, India, and China. Verardi has joined or directed several archaeological missions to central Asia, and held positions on Italian scientific boards. He has a particular interest in Indian iconography and history.

== Biography ==
Giovanni Verardi (born 1947) was a professor at the University of Naples of Oriental Studies ("L'Orientale"), Italy, where he taught Art and Archaeology of Central Asia and Art and Archaeology of India. He spent time in a number of universities outside Italy, including as a maître de conférences at the Collège de France in Paris, guest professor at the University of Kyoto, and visiting professor in Japan (Kyoto University, Seijō University, and International College for Advanced Buddhist Studies in Tokyo).

As early as 1970 he joined the Italian Archaeological Mission to Afghanistan, where he started his work as field archaeologist at the Buddhist site of Tapa Sardar near Ghazni, in whose territory he carried out extensive surveys that led to the discovery of several groups of Buddhist rock-cut monasteries.

In 1981 he joined the Italian Archaeological Mission to Nepal, of which he became director in 1988. Research work was first carried out at the site of Harigaon in Kathmandu and after at the Aśokan site of Gotihawa in the Tarai, c. 25 km west of Lumbini.

In the 1980s Verardi participated in the activities of the German-Italian Mission to Mohenjo-daro in Pakistan, where he could ascertain that the so-called stūpa-cum monastery rising upon the ruins of the Indus town is nothing but the articulated late phase of the Indus religious/ritual building, erroneously interpreted as a Buddhist structure by John Marshall. Between 1998 and 2003, Verardi was co-director of the Italian-Chinese team engaged in the excavation of the Fengxiansi monastery at Longmen near Luoyang, connected with the Empress Wu Zetian (AD 690‒705) and rebuilt during the Song dynasty.

Besides his activity as a field archaeologist, Verardi has devoted himself to the study of Indian iconography and Indian history. He retired in November 2007.

== Academic positions ==
- Tenant of a ‘Fellowship for promoting teaching and research formation’ at the Università degli Studi di Napoli "L'Orientale" and at the University of Venice from 1972 to 1980
- Reader at the University of Venice and the University of Bologna from 1981 to 1987
- Associate Professor of 'Archaeology and Art History of North-Western India and Afghanistan' at the Università "L'Orientale" from 1988 to 1993
- Professor of 'Archaeology and Art History of Central Asia' at the Università "L'Orientale" from 1994 to 2000
- Professor of 'Archaeology and Art History of India' at the Università "L'Orientale" from 2000 to 2007, also entrusted with the teaching of 'Archaeology and Art History of Central Asia' from 2000 to 2003.
- 1976–77 at the École française d'Extrême-Orient, Pondicherry, India
- 1990–91 Maître de conférences, Collège de France (Histoire du monde indien), Paris
- Sabbatical year 1997–98 at the École française d'Extrême-Orient, Pondicherry and Asiatic Society, Calcutta
- Guest scholar at the Institute for the Research in the Humanities, Kyoto University, March 2000 and March 2002
- Visiting professor at Seijō University, Tokyo, September 2006 – February 2007
- Visiting professor at Kyoto University (Institute for Research in the Humanities), 2010
- Visiting professor, International College for Advanced Buddhist Studies, Tokyo 2011
- Member of the Italian Archaeological Mission to Afghanistan from 1970 to 1978
- Member of the Italian Archaeological Mission to Nepal from 1981 to 1987
- Member of the German-Italian Archaeological Mission to Mohenjo-daro, Pakistan, from 1984 to 1987
- Director of the Italian Archaeological Mission to Nepal from 1988 to 2007
- Director of the Italian Archaeological Mission to Afghanistan from 2002 to 2004
- Co-director of the Italian Archaeological Mission to Luoyang, China, from 1997 to 2002
- Italian Representative of the UNESCO Committee for Afghanistan from 2003 to 2005
- Fellow of Istituto Italiano per l'Africa e l'Oriente (IsIAO, former IsMEO), Rome, since 1974
- Charged by the Soprintendenza ai Beni Culturali of Venice with the new inventory of the Museo Orientale of Venice, 1976–77
- Charged by the University of Bologna and the Museo Medievale e del Rinascimento of Bologna with the re-organisation of the Pullé Indian collection, 1984–89
- Member of the Scientific Board of the monthly magazine Archeo from 1986 to 1991
- Charged by the University of Florence with the new arrangement of the De Gubernatis Indian collection of the Museo Nazionale di Antropologia ed Etnologia, Florence, 1987
- Member of the Scientific Board of Istituto Italiano per l'Africa e l'Oriente from 2000 to 2004
- Co-editor (Middle and Far-Eastern sections) of the II Supplement (5 vols.) to Enciclopedia dell'arte antica, classica e orientale, Istituto dell'Enciclopedia Italiana (1989–96)
- Member of the Scientific Board of Annali dell'Istituto Orientale from 1993 to 1997
- Editor of Annali dell'Istituto Orientale di Napoli from 1998 to 2001
- President of the Centre of Buddhist Studies, Università "L'Orientale" from 2002 to 2004
- Member of the Nucleo di Valutazione Interno, Università "L'Orientale" from 2002 to 2006.

== Selected publications ==
[Book reviews, reviews of exhibitions, articles for the Enciclopedia Italiana, articles for Ancient Nepal, etc. are not included]

=== 1975–85 ===
- 'Notes on Afghan Archaeology, I. A Gandharan Relief from Qarabāg-e Gaznī, East and West 25, 1975, pp. 287–90. Rome.
- 'Notes on Afghan Archaeology, II. Gaṇeśa Seated on Lion: A New Śāhi Marble', East and West 27, 1977, pp. 277–83. Rome.
- 'Tapa Sardār. Second Preliminary Report', East and West 28, 1978, pp. 33–136. Rome. (With M. Taddei).
- 'The Buddhist Cave Complex of Homay Qal'a', in J.E. van Lohuizen-de Leeuw ed., South Asian Archaeology 1975, pp. 119–26. Leiden 1979.
- 'La baoli hoysala di Huligere', Annali della Facoltà di Lingue e Letterature Straniere di Ca' Foscari 19/3, 1980, pp. 103–11. Venezia.
- 'Tapa Sarudaru no bukkyo chokoku', Ars Buddhica 138, 1981, pp. 11–22. Tokyo. (With M. Taddei).
- 'Un'ipotesi sulla decorazione di una grotta del Jaghuri (Afghanistan)', in Annali dell'Istituto Orientale di Napoli 41, 1981, pp. 261–69. Napoli.
- 'Osservazioni sulle sculpture in argilla e su alcuni ambienti dei complessi templari I e II di Pendzikent', Annali dell'Istituto Orientale di Napoli 42, 1982, pp. 247–304. Napoli.
- 'The Kuṣāṇa Emperors as cakravartins', East and West 33, 1983, pp. 225–94. Rome.
- 'Osservazioni sulla coroplastica di epoca Kuṣāṇa nel Nord-Ovest e in Afghanistan in relazione al materiale di Tapa Sardār, seguite da una precisazione sulla natura e la data delle sculpture di Ushkur', * in Annali dell'Istituto Orientale di Napoli 43, 1983, pp. 479–502. Napoli.
- 'Gandharan Imagery at Tapa Sardar', in R. Allchin ed., South Asian Archaeology 1981, pp. 257–62. Cambridge 1984.
- 'The Italian Archaeological Mission in Afghanistan: Brief Account of Excavation and Study, in Studi di storia dell'arte in memoria di Mario Rotili, 2 vols, I, pp. 41–70. Banca Sannitica, Napoli 1984 (with M. Taddei).
- 'Avatāraṇa: a Note on the Bodhisattva Image Dated in the Third Year of Kaniṣka in the Sarnath Museum', East and West 35, 1985, pp. 67–101. Rome.
- 'Clays Stūpas and Thrones at Tapa Sardar, Ghazni (Afghanistan)', Zinbun. Memoirs of the Research Institute for Humanistic Studies, Kyoto University 20, 1985, pp. 17–32. Kyoto. (with M. Taddei).

=== 1986–1995 ===
- Arte e civiltà dell'India antica (= Archeo dossier no. 30). Istituto Geografico De Agostini, Novara 1987.
- 'The Buddha's Dhuni', in M Yaldiz & W. Lobo eds, Investigating Indian Art. Proceedings of a Symposium on the Development of Early Buddhist and Hindu Iconography held at the Museum of Indian Art, Berlin, in May 1986, pp. 369–83. Berlin 1987.
- 'Preliminary Report on the Stupa and the Monastery of Mohenjo-Daro', in M. Jansen e G. Urban eds., Reports on Field Wok Carried out at Mohenjo-Daro. Interim Reports, vol. 2, pp. 45–58. Aachen-Roma 1987.
- 'Thoughts on the Buddhist Sites of Sind', in Sindhological Studies, Summer 1987, pp. 40–75. Jamshoro [Hyderabad, Pakistan].
- Harigaon Satya Narayana, Kathmandu. A Report on the Excavations Carried out in 1984–88 (IsMEO Reports and Memoirs 22). Rome 1988.
- 'Tematiche indiane di alcune iconografie gandhariche. Il Buddha, Agni, i lakṣaṇa, il miracolo di Śrāvastī e altri temi connessi', in G.Gnoli e L. Lanciotti eds., Orientalia Josephi Tucci Dicata, 3 vols., pp. 1533–49. Roma 1988.
- 'A Trial-Trench at Dhumvarahi', in M. Taddei ed., South Asian Archaeology 1987, pp. 869–911. Roma 1990.
- Le sculpture del Gandhara nel Civico Museo Archeologico di Milano (= Notizie dal Chiostro del Monastero Maggiore, Suppl. 7). Milano 1991.
- Excavations at Harigaon, Kathmandu. Final Report. (IsMEO Reports and Memoirs 25), 2 vols. Rome 1992.
- 'Arheologija i buddizm – vklad Ital'janskogo Instituta Srednego i Dal'nego Vostoka (IsMEO)', in Vestnik Drevnej Istorii, 1993/2, pp. 152–62. Moskva. (With M. Taddei).
- Homa and Other Fire Rituals in Gandhāra. Supplement no. 79 to Annali dell'Istituto Orientale di Napoli 54/2. Napoli 1994.

=== 1996–2005 ===
- 'On Edward W. Said's Aida', in Annali dell'Istituto Orientale di Napoli 56, 1996, pp. 524–35. Napoli.
- 'Religions, Rituals, and the Heaviness of Indian History', Annali dell'Istituto Orientale di Napoli 56, 1996, pp. 215–53. Napoli.
- 'The Buddhists, the Gnostics and the Antinomistic Society, or the Arabian Sea in the First-Second Century AD', Annali dell'Istituto Orientale di Napoli 57, 1997, 323–46. Napoli.
- 'Aerial Imagery, GIS and Predictive Models for Identifying Archaeological Sites, Tarai (Nepal)', in M. Taddei e G. De Marco eds, South Asian Archaeology 1997, 3 vols., pp. 679–96. Roma-Napoli 2000. (With Maria Jacoli).
- 'The Buddha-Elephant', Silk Road and Archaeology 6 (= Papers in honour of Francine Tissot), eds. E. Errington and O. Bopearachchi, pp. 69–74. Kamakura 1999/2000.
- Excavations at Gotihawa and Territorial Survey in the Kapilbastu District of Nepal. Lumbini International Research Institute, Lumbini 2001.
- 'Diffusione e tramonto del Buddhismo in Kirghisistan', in B. Genito ed, Pastori erranti dell'Asia. Popoli, archaeologia e storia nelle steppe dei Kirghisi [Catalogue of exhibition], pp. 93–94. Napoli 2002.
- 'Images of Destruction. An Enquiry into Hindu Icons in their Relations to Buddhism', Buddhist Asia 1. pp. 1–36. Kyoto 2003.
- Buddhist Caves of Jāghūrī and Qarabāgh-e Ghaznī, Afghanistan. IsIAO Reports and Memoirs, New Series 2. Rome 2004 (with E. Paparatti, and with an Appendix by M. Inaba).
- 'Excavations at Pipri, Nepalese Tarai', in U. Franke-Vogt and H.-J. Weisshaar eds., South Asian Archaeology 1993, pp. 285–90. Bonn 2005 (with S. Coccia).
- 'From Early to Late Tapa Sardār. A Tentative Chronology', East and West 55, 2005, pp. 405–44. Rome (with E. Paparatti).

(ed.) Nepalese and Italian Contributions to the History and Archaeology of Nepal. Proceedings of the Seminar Held at Hanuman Dhoka, Kathmandu, on 27–28 January 1995 (IsIAO Reports and

- Memoirs, Series Minor 2). Roma 1997. Includes, by G. Verardi,
- 'The History of Nepal as Seen by the Italian Scholars' (with Luciano Petech), pp. 23–28;
- 'Buddhism and National Identities. The Archaeological Evidence from Kathmandu and the Case of China and India', pp. 37–48.
- (ed.) 'Report on the 1997 Excavations at Weiwan, Longmen (China)', Annali dell'Istituto Orientale di Napoli 58, 1998, pp. 409–62. Napoli. (With Liu Jinglong).
- (ed.) Buddhist Asia 1. Papers from the First Conference of Buddhist Studies Held in Naples in May 2001. Italian School of Eastern Asian Studies, Kyoto 2003. (With S. Vita).
- (ed.) On Gandhara. Collected Articles [by] Maurizio Taddei, 2 vols. Università degli Studi di Napoli "L'Orientale", Collana Collectanea 3. Napoli 2003. (With A. Filigenzi).

=== 2006 to Present ===
- Lo scavo del Fengxiansi a Longmen', in Tang. Arte e cultura in Cina prima dell'anno Mille, pp. 86–91. Napoli 2006.
- 'The Aśokan Sanctuary at Gotihawa, Nepalese Tarai', in Indo-Kōko-Kenkyū 28, 2006–2007, pp. 1–10. Tokyo.
- Excavations at Gotihawa and Pipri, Kapilbastu District, Nepal. IsIAO, Roma 2007.
- 'Tokens and Counters in the Ganges Valley from the late Chalcolithic Period to the Early Centuries AD' and 'Summing Up', in A.M. D'Onofrio ed., Tallies, Tokens and Counters. From the Mediterranean to India: A Cross-Cultural Approach, pp. 97–115, 163–71. Università degli Studi di Napoli “L'Orientale”. Napoli 2007.
- 'The So-called Stupa at Mohenjo Daro and its Relationship with the Ancient Citadel'. South Asian Archaeology 2007. IsIAO-University of Bologna (forth.). Also, in Prāgdhārā. Journal of the U.P. State Archaeology Department 19, 2008–2009, pp. 147–70. Lucknow. (With Federica Barba).
- 'Buddha’s Birth and Reassessment of the Archaeological Evidence', in Ch. Cueppers, M. Deeg and H. Durt eds, The Birth of the Buddha. Proceedings of the Seminar Held in Lumbini, Nepal, October 2004, pp. 19–39. Lumbini International Research Institute, Lumbini 2010.
- 'Issues in the Excavation, Chronology and Monuments of Tapa Sardar', in M. Alram et al. eds, Coins, Art and Chronology II. The First Millennium C.E. in the Indo-Iranian Borderlands, pp. 341–56. Österreichische Akademie der Wissenschaften. Wien 2010.
- Hardships and Downfall of Buddhism in India. Appendices by Federica Barba. Manohar, Delhi 2011.
- 'Buddhism in North-western India and Eastern Afghanistan, Sixth to Ninth Century AD', in Zinbun 43, pp. 147–83. Kyoto 2011.
- 'The Brahmanisation of Gandhāra', in Glimpses of Indian History and Art. Reflections on the Past, Perspectives for the Future, in T. Lorenzetti and F. Scialpi eds, pp. 000. Roma 2011.

(ed.) Tang. Arte e cultura in Cina prima dell'anno Mille (Catalogue of the Exhibition, Naples, 16 December 2005 – 22 April 2006). Napoli 2006. (With L. Caterina).

== Essential publications ==
- “Tapa Sardār. Second Preliminary Report”, East and West 28, 1978, pp. 33–136. Rome. (With M. Taddei).
- “The Kuṣāṇa Emperors as cakravartins', East and West 33, 1983, pp. 225–94. Rome.
- Excavations at Harigaon, Kathmandu. Final Report. (IsMEO Reports and Memoirs 25), 2 vols. Rome 1992.
- Homa and Other Fire Rituals in Gandhāra. Supplement no. 79 to Annali dell'Istituto Orientale di Napoli 54/2. Napoli 1994.
- Buddhist Caves of Jāghūrī and Qarabāgh-e Ghaznī, Afghanistan. IsIAO Reports and Memoirs, New Series 2. Rome 2004 (with E. Paparatti, and with an Appendix by M. Inaba).
- “From Early to Late Tapa Sardār. A Tentative Chronology”', East and West 55, 2005, pp. 405–44. Rome (with E. Paparatti).
- (ed.) “Report on the 1997 Excavations at Weiwan, Longmen (China)”', Annali dell'Istituto Orientale di Napoli 58, 1998, pp. 409–62. Napoli. (With Liu Jinglong).
- Excavations at Gotihawa and Pipri, Kapilbastu District, Nepal. IsIAO, Roma 2007.
- “'The So-called Stupa at Mohenjo Daro and its Relationship with the Ancient Citadel”'. South Asian Archaeology 2007. IsIAO-University of Bologna (forth.). Also, in Prāgdhārā. Journal of the U.P. State Archaeology Department 19, 2008–2009, pp. 147–70. Lucknow. (With Federica Barba).
- “'Buddha’s Birth and Reassessment of the Archaeological Evidence”, in Ch. Cueppers, M. Deeg and H. Durt eds., The Birth of the Buddha. Proceedings of the Seminar Held in Lumbini, Nepal, October 2004, pp. 19–39. Lumbini International Research Institute, Lumbini 2010.
- Hardships and Downfall of Buddhism in India. Appendices by Federica Barba. Manohar, Delhi 2011.
