= Anshuman Tiwari =

Indian journalist

- Born: Uttar Pradesh, India
- Occupation: Journalist
- Education: BA, MA (double), Master's Diploma in Mass Communication and Journalism
- Alma mater: University of Uttar Pradesh, India
- Years active: 1991–present
- Notable awards: Ramnath Goenka Award for Investigative Journalism

Website
- artharthanshuman.blogspot.in

Anshuman Tiwari (born 25 March 1974) is an Indian journalist.

== Life and career ==
Anshuman Tiwari was born on 25 March 1974 in Uttar Pradesh, India. He graduated with a Bachelor of Arts in Hindi/English literature, Geography in 1988 from Kannauj, Uttar Pradesh, and got a master's degree as Master of Arts (double), Geography and Hindi Literature from Kanpur, Uttar Pradesh in 1990 with a professional degree in Master's Diploma in Mass communication and Journalism in 1991 from Bharatiya Vidya Bhavan, Kanpur.

He worked at Dainik Jagran in various positions and was its chief of national bureau. He led Money Bhaskar (Hindi economic content vertical of to DB Corp) as an editor and Vertical Head.

He started his career as stock market correspondent at Kanpur in the early 90s. He covered various economic ministries and reported on macroeconomic, trade and financial markets.

He investigated Delhi CWG Commonwealth Games 2012 for a three years long exposé as the chief of National Bureau of Dainik Jagran.

He initiated, planned and executed the digital transition of Dainik Jagran.

Prior to his current appointment, he worked at India Today (Hindi) as editor.

Since October 2021, he has been employed as editor of Money9, part of the TV9 Network, after having worked six years at India Today.

== Honours, awards and accolades ==
- Recipient of Ramnath Goenka Award for investigative journalism
- Rashtriya Arthik Hindi Patrakarita Purskar 2007 Banaras Beads limited Varanasi National award for Economic Journalism in Hindi

== Publications ==
- Research paper on the conundrum of online comments, How to get most out of wise crowd, from University of Westminster under Chevening Fellowship
- Paper – Economic Impact of Terror on South Asia
- Paper on India and China relations published from ISAS Singapore; profile carried in the collection of seminal papers

== Books ==
- Tiwari, Anshuman; Sengupta, Anindya (10 August 2018). Laxminama: Monks, Merchants, Money and Mantra. Bloomsbury Publishing. ISBN 978-93-87146-80-8.
- Tiwari, Anshuman; Sengupta, Anindya (1 October 2021). Ulti Ginti (in Hindi). Rajkamal Prakashan. ISBN 978-93-90971-28-2.
