= Anshuman Nandi =

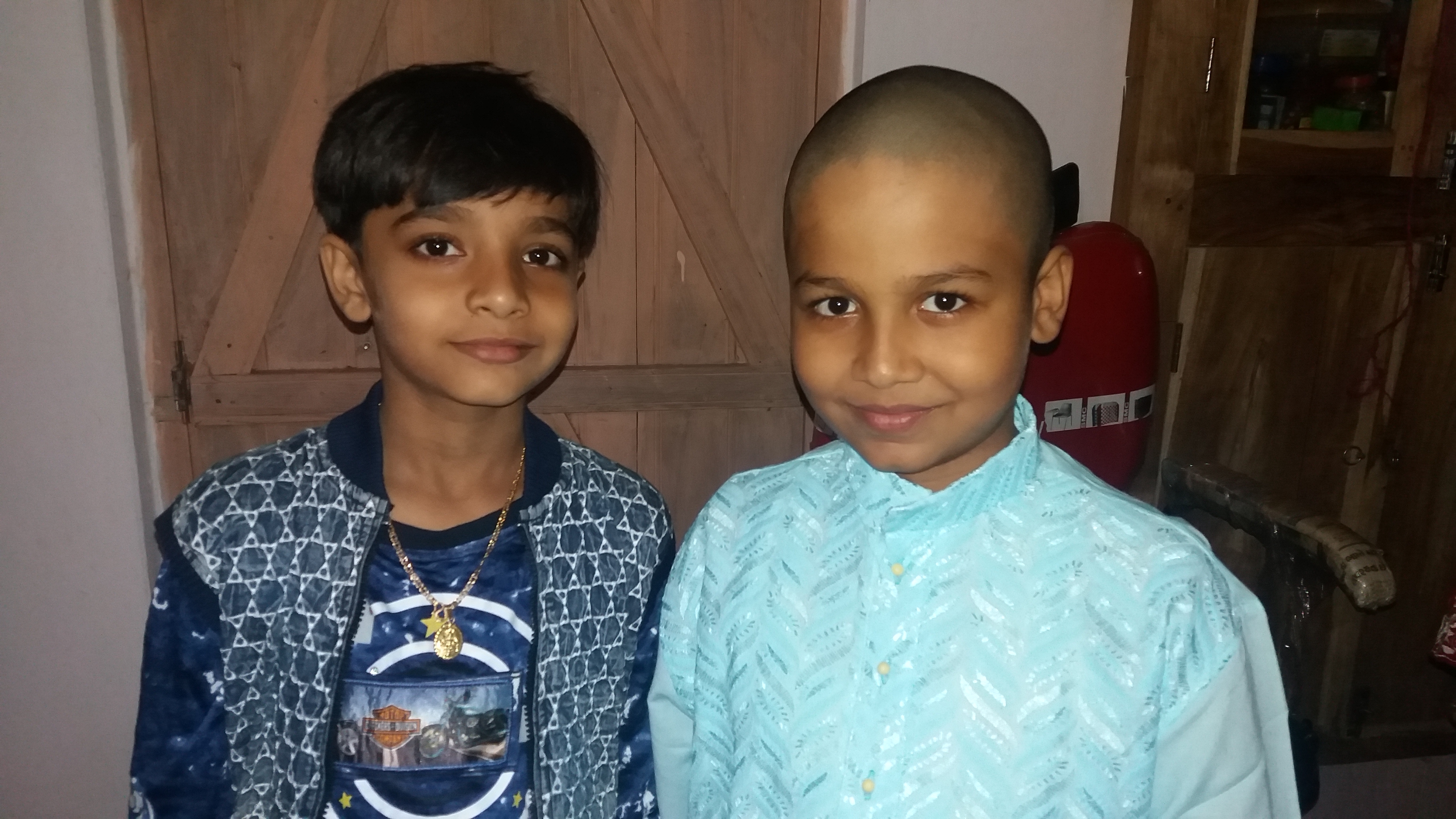
- Nandi (left) with Rajpreet Chakraborty (right)
- Occupations: Drummer, musician, child actor
- Years active: 2013–present
- Parent(s): Biswajit Nandi; Reshmi Nandi (died 2017)
- Awards: National Award in Music

Anshuman Nandi (Bengali Pronunciation:-Anshuman Nondi) is a drummer and child actor from the hills of Tripura. He was 3 years old when he performed in India's Got Talent. He has also made his Bollywood debut as a child actor in 2017 Bollywood film Hindi Medium alongside Irrfan Khan.

Nandi won the National Award in music when he was only 3 years.
