= Stefano Zacchetti =

Italian academic (1968–2020)

Stefano Zacchetti (1968 – April 29, 2020) was an Italian academic specialising in Buddhist studies.

From 2012 until his death in 2020 he was Yehan Numata Professor of Buddhist Studies at the University of Oxford and a professorial fellow of Balliol College, Oxford.

== Career ==
Born in 1968, Zacchetti studied Chinese and Sanskrit at Ca' Foscari University of Venice from 1986 to 1994, graduating with a Bachelor of Arts degree; this included two years of study abroad, at Sichuan University (1990–92). He then carried out doctoral studies at Venice and spent time studying at the Sinologisch Instituut and the Kern Institute at Leiden University. Ca' Foscari University of Venice awarded him a PhD in Asian Studies in 1999.

Zacchetti taught Sinology at University of Padua for the 1999–2000 academic year. In 2001, he was appointed an associate professor at the International Research Institute for Advanced Buddhology at Sōka University in Tokyo. He returned to Ca' Foscari University of Venice in 2005 to take up a tenured lectureship in the Department of Asian and North African Studies. In the autumn of 2011 he was a visiting professor at the University of California, Berkeley. In 2012, he was appointed Yehan Numata Professor of Buddhist Studies at the University of Oxford and a professorial fellow of Balliol College, Oxford.

Zacchetti died on 29 April 2020 due to COVID-19.

== Research ==
According to an obituary written by Balliol College, Zacchetti's specialisms were: "early Chinese Buddhist translations (2nd-5th centuries CE); Mahāyāna literature in Sanskrit and Chinese; the history of the Chinese Buddhist canon; and Chinese Buddhism (particularly early Chinese Buddhist commentaries)". Sociotechnical researcher Christine Borgman gave a detailed account of his data scholarship in one of her books. The obituary from the European Association for Chinese Studies considered him to rank as among the "most distinguished scholars and teachers in the field of Buddhist Studies."

== Publications ==
- The Da zhidu lun 大智度論 (*Mahāprajñāpāramitopadeśa) and the History of the Larger Prajñāpāramitā: Patterns of Textual Variation in Mahāyāna Sūtra Literature, Hamburg Buddhist Studies 14 (Bochum/Freiberg: Projektverlag, 2021 – edited for publication by Michael Radich and Jonathan Silk).
- In Praise of the Light: A Critical Synoptic Edition with an Annotated Translation of Chapters 1-3 of Dharmarakṣa’s Guang zan jing 光讚經, Being the Earliest Chinese Translation of the Larger Prajñāpāramitā, Bibliotheca Philologica et Philosophica Buddhica VIII (Tokyo: The International Research Institute for Advanced Buddhology, 2005).
- ‘Some remarks on Peṭaka passages in the Da Zhidu Lun and their relation to the Pāli Peṭakopadesa’, Annual Report of The International Research Institute for Advanced Buddhology at Soka University for the Academic Year 2001 (ARIRIAB), vol. 5: 67-86, 2002.
