= Haregaon =

Village in Maharashtra

Haregaon Haregoan
- city
- Location in Maharashtra, India Haregaon (India)
- Coordinates: 19.67°N 74.71°E
- Country: India
- State: Maharashtra
- District: Ahmadnagar

Languages
  - Official: Marathi
- Time zone: UTC+5:30 (IST)

Haregaon (also Harigaon) is a village in Shrirampur, Ahmednagar District, Maharashtra, India. It is approximately 5 km from Shrirampur city on altitude.

== History ==
Haregaon had one of the sugar factories in Maharashtra Belapur Sugar & Allied Industries Limited.(Brady & Brady Group) Set up by the British in early 1919s. The name of the village is believed to be named after Mr. Harison, one of the founders of the factory. The factory had to shut down in 1988 due to scarcity of sugarcane. The village that was inhabited by factory workers became desolate.

== Religious importance ==
=== Haregaon Shrine ===
St. Theresa Church, Haregaon is the sacred place of Mauli Shrine and the annual yatra held in her honour every September. The name is associated with the shrine of mount mary in Bandra. Mumbai where the original veneration of mary has been held for her birthday on 8 September, accompanied by a famous fair.

Mat is corruption of Mount and Mary is lovingly referred to as Mauli, the Mother. Catholic pilgrims in the area visit the village for the Feast of the Blessed Virgin Mary, celebrated on the second Saturday of September.

St. Teresa Church, Haregaon

In 1950, rev. Fr. John Haldner erected the Church, the Yatra (Feast) was started in 1947 to help local devotees who could not afford to go to the celebration in Bandra, Mumbai. Now Haregaon is often described as the Jerusalem of the Marathi-speaking Catholics in the state, as nearly 400,000 devotees from Ahmednagar, Pune, Nasik, Aurangabad district and Mumbai attend the feast every year.
