= List of Hindi film actresses =

A glimpse of the many celebrated actresses of Hindi Cinema over the decades

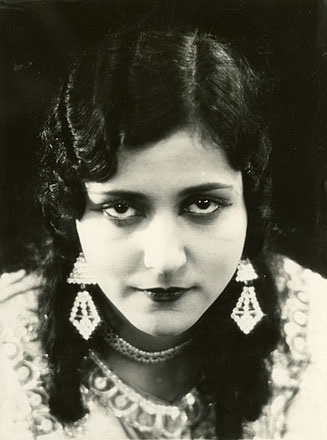
1920s: Sulochana

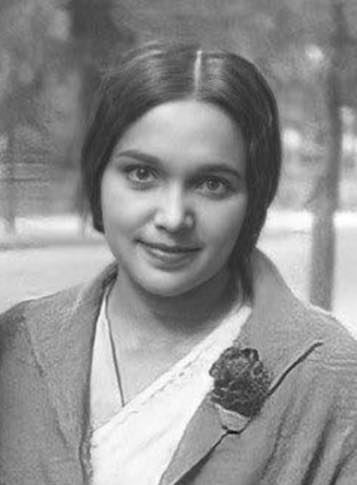
1930s: Devika Rani

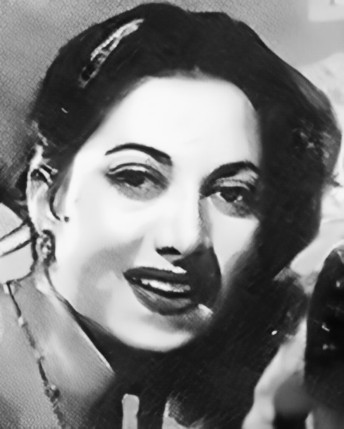
1940s: Suraiya

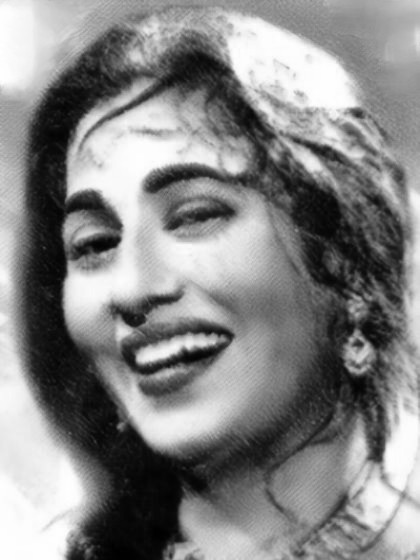
1950s: Madhubala

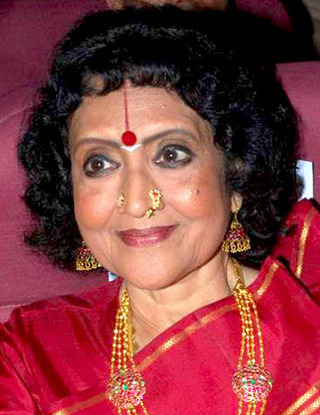
1960s: Vyjayanthimala

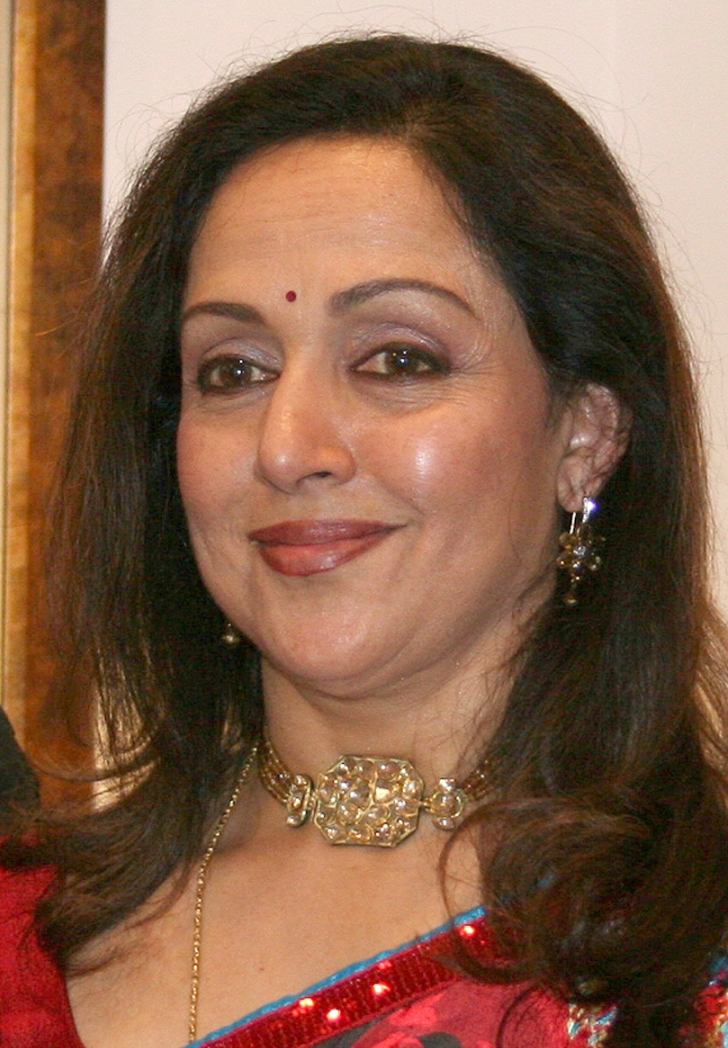
1970s: Hema Malini

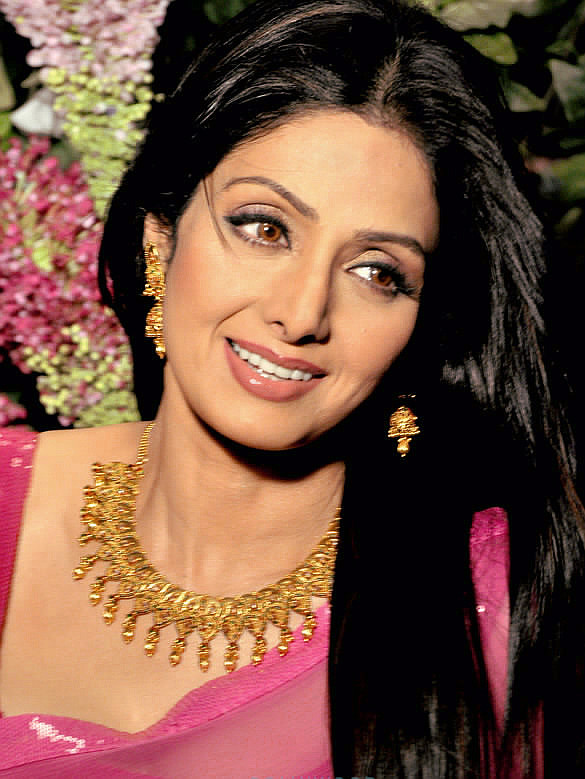
1980s: Sridevi

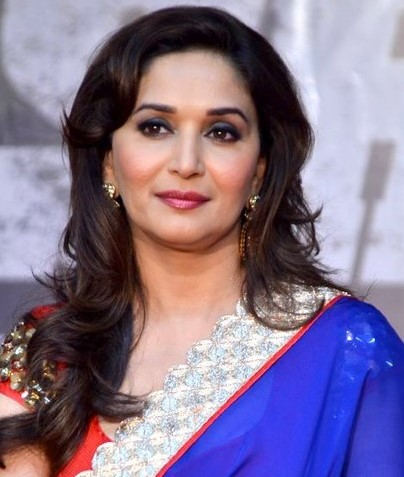
1990s: Madhuri Dixit

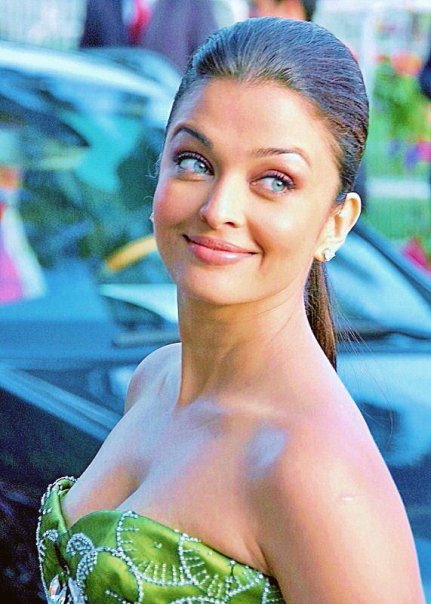
2000s: Aishwarya Rai

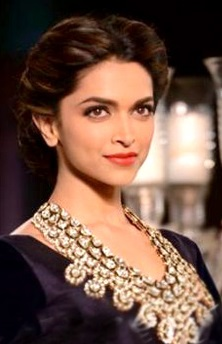
2010s: Deepika Padukone

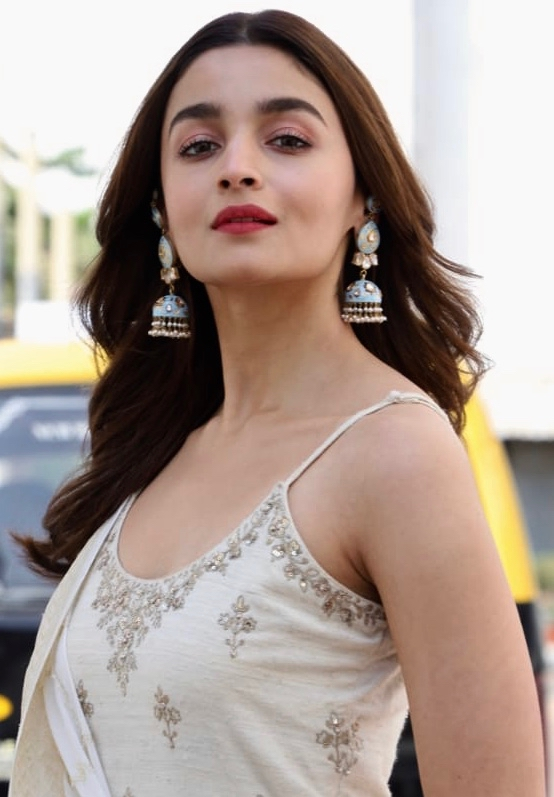
2020s:
Alia Bhatt

Given below is a list of all the notable actresses, who have starred in Hindi cinema, the Hindi language film industry now known as Bollywood, based primarily in Mumbai. Many actresses have had careers spanning multiple decades, often becoming closely associated with specific periods during which their influence and popularity peaked.

In early Indian cinema, men often played female roles because acting was considered taboo for women. In 1913, Durgabai Kamat and her 4-year-old daughter, Kamlabai Gokhale, were the first female actors to appear in a full-length feature Indian film. During the 1920s, many women from Anglo-Indian and Jewish backgrounds began working in silent films, adopting screen names like Sulochana and Sudhabala, which helped pave the way for pioneers like Durga Khote and Devika Rani to build successful careers. Simultaneously, the gradual transition to talkie films made vocal ability a desirable skill among actors, which led to the rise of many singing stars like Kajjanbai, Khursheed Bano, Suraiya and Noor Jehan, with many later migrating to Pakistani cinema after the partition of India in 1947. During the 'Golden Age' (late 1940s–1960s), the rise and integration of playback singing and dance brought more emphasis on nuanced performances, bringing forth artists like Nargis, Meena Kumari, Madhubala, Nutan, Geeta Bali, Vyjayanthimala, Asha Parekh and Waheeda Rehman. By the 1970s, Hindi cinema had evolved to color films and bona fide stars like Sharmila Tagore, Hema Malini, Jaya Bhaduri, Rekha, Parveen Babi, and Zeenat Aman dominated the silver screen, each embodying distinct traditional and modern archetypes. The 1980s saw Shabana Azmi and Smita Patil emerge as leading figures of 'Parallel Cinema' for their strong and realistic portrayals, in contrast to contemporary stars such as Sridevi, Jaya Prada, Dimple Kapadia and Meenakshi Sheshadri. The 1990s witnessed a diverse group of actresses, including Madhuri Dixit, Juhi Chawla, Kajol, Karisma Kapoor, Tabu, and Manisha Koirala, who captivated audiences with their charm while also embracing more unconventional roles at times.

Since the early 2000s, pageant winners turned actresses like Aishwarya Rai and Priyanka Chopra have broadened Bollywood's global reach, while Rani Mukerji, Kareena Kapoor, Vidya Balan, Kangana Ranaut, and Deepika Padukone have each carved a niche for themselves, whether it’s emphasizing women-led cinema, extending career longevity, or advocating for better work conditions for female artists. More recently, actresses like Alia Bhatt, Kriti Sanon, Yami Gautam, Sanya Malhotra and Tripti Dimri have achieved both artistic recognition and popularity. The advent of streaming has further democratized storytelling, enabling actresses of all backgrounds to experiment with diverse roles and gain critical acclaim.

The following are some of the most renowned actresses and the decades when they were most recognized.

== 1920s ==
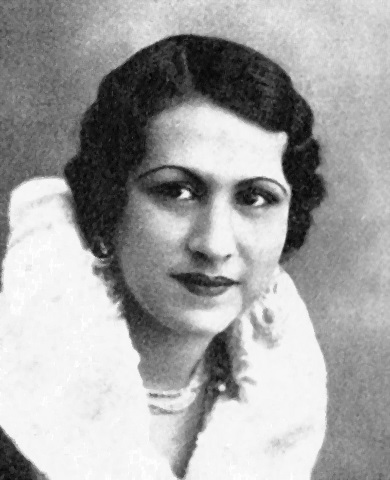
Patience Cooper

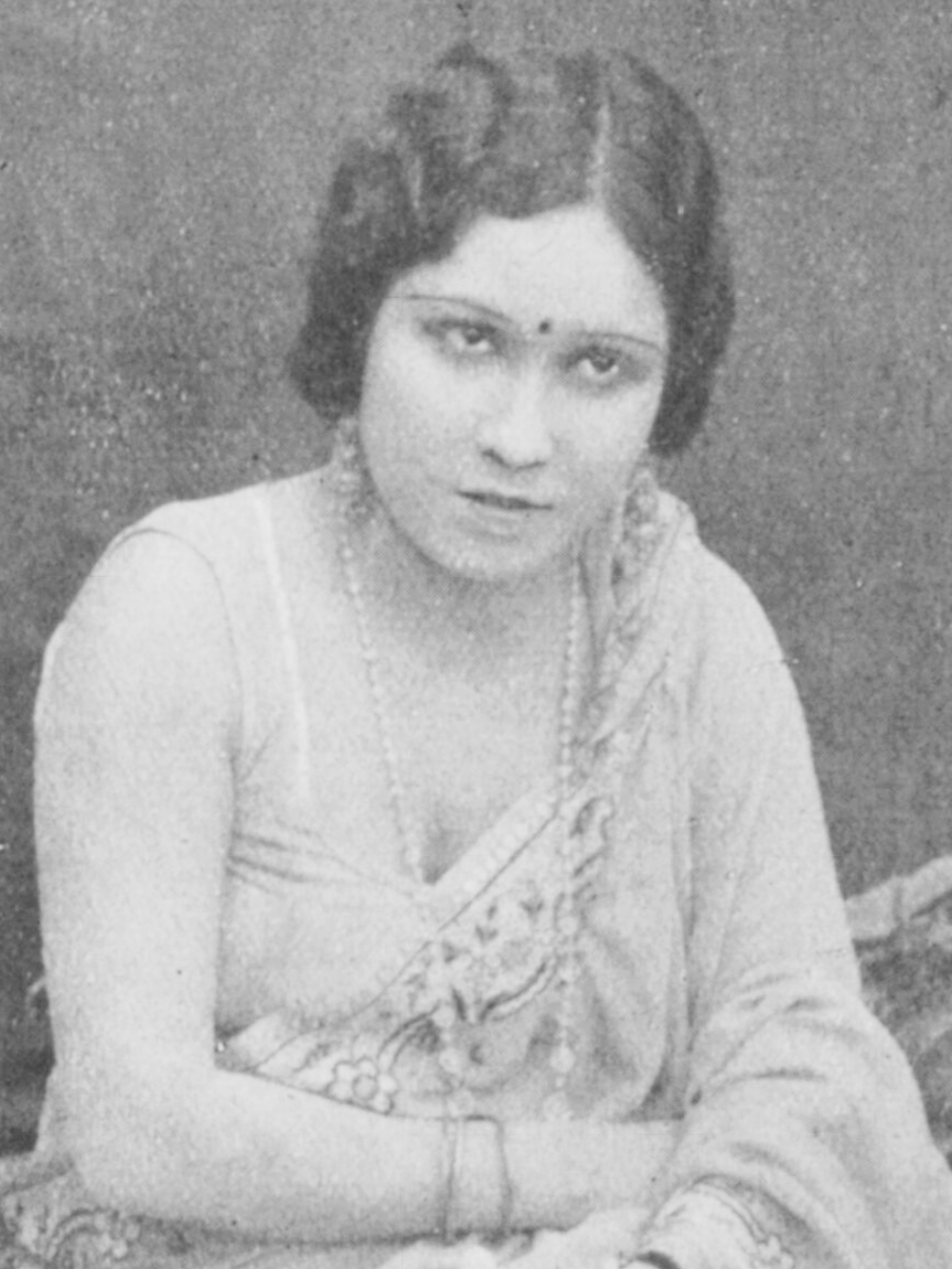
Sudhabala

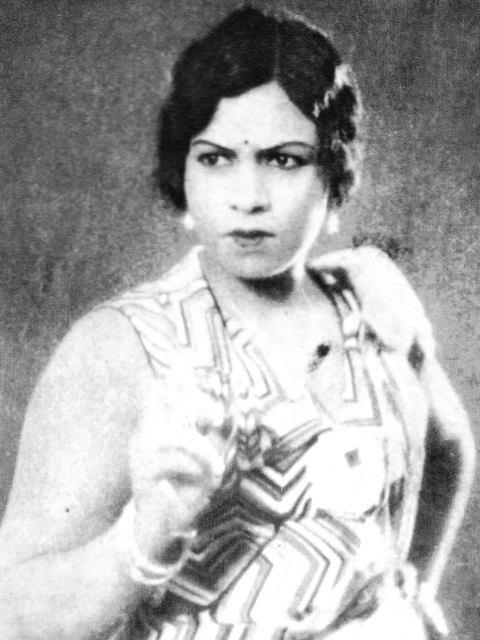
Fatma Begum

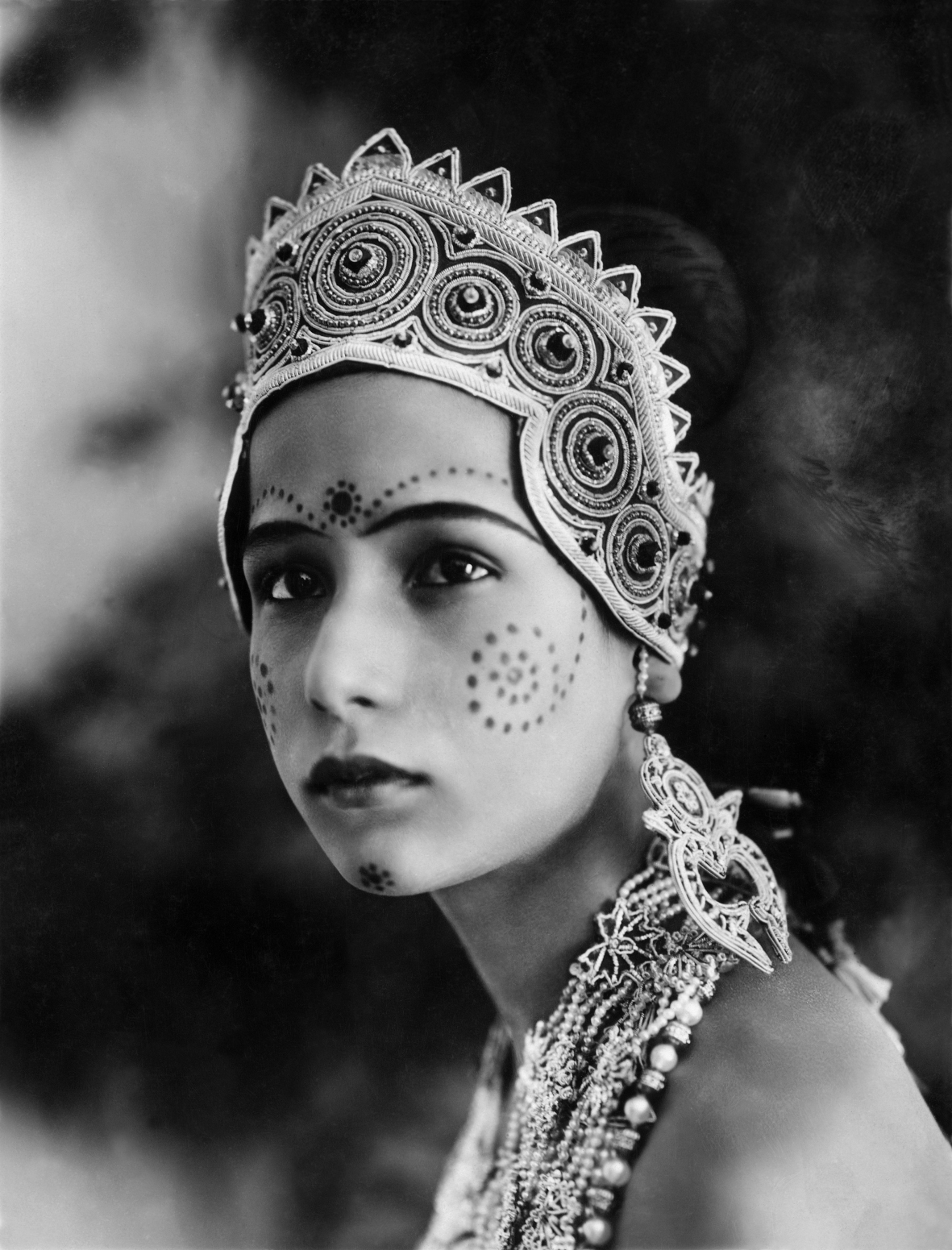
Seeta Devi

Year	Name	Debut film
1920	Patience Cooper	Damayanti
1922	Fatma Begum	Veer Abhimanyu
1922	Ermeline	Bhishma Pitamah
1922	Sultana	Veer Abhimanyu
1923	Zubeida	Kohinoor
1925	Seeta Devi	Prem Sanyas
1925	Ruby Myers	Cinema Ki Rani
1926	Gohar Mamajiwala	Baap Kamai
1926	Indira Devi	Jaydev
1926	Zebunissa	Lakho Phulani
1928	Mehtab	Second Wife

== 1930s ==
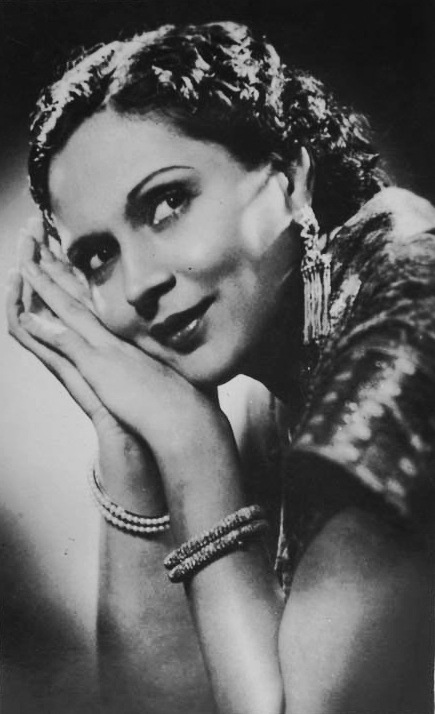
Durga Khote

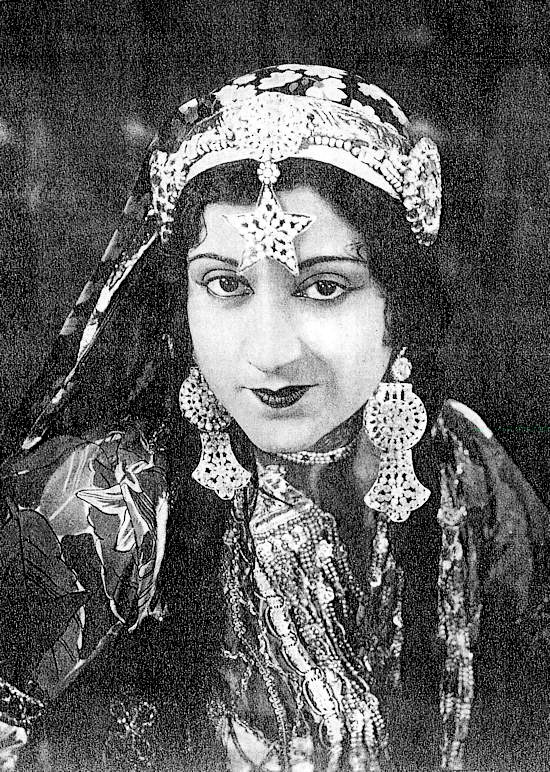
Sultana Razzaq

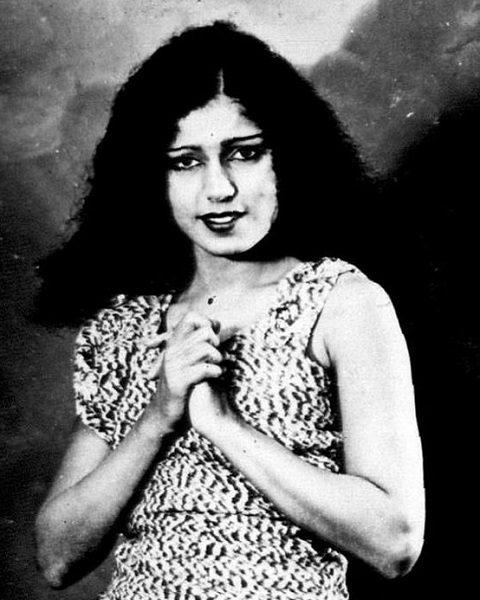
Zubeida

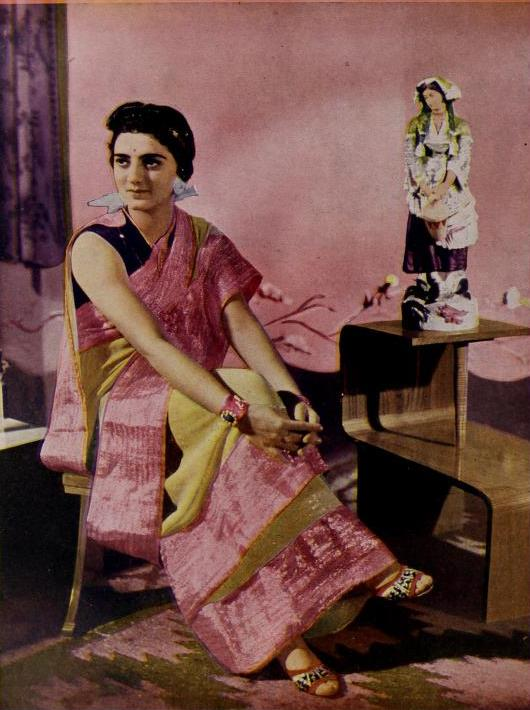
Sabita Devi

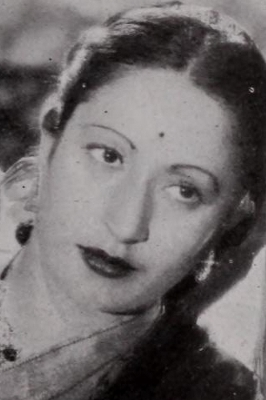
Bibbo

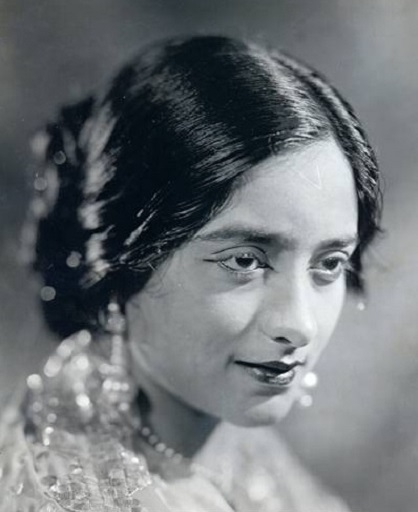
Rattan Bai

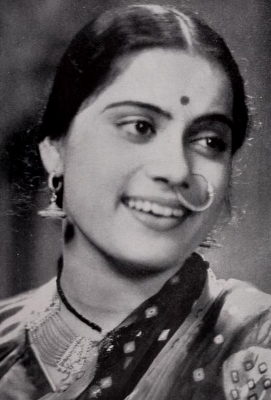
Shanta Apte

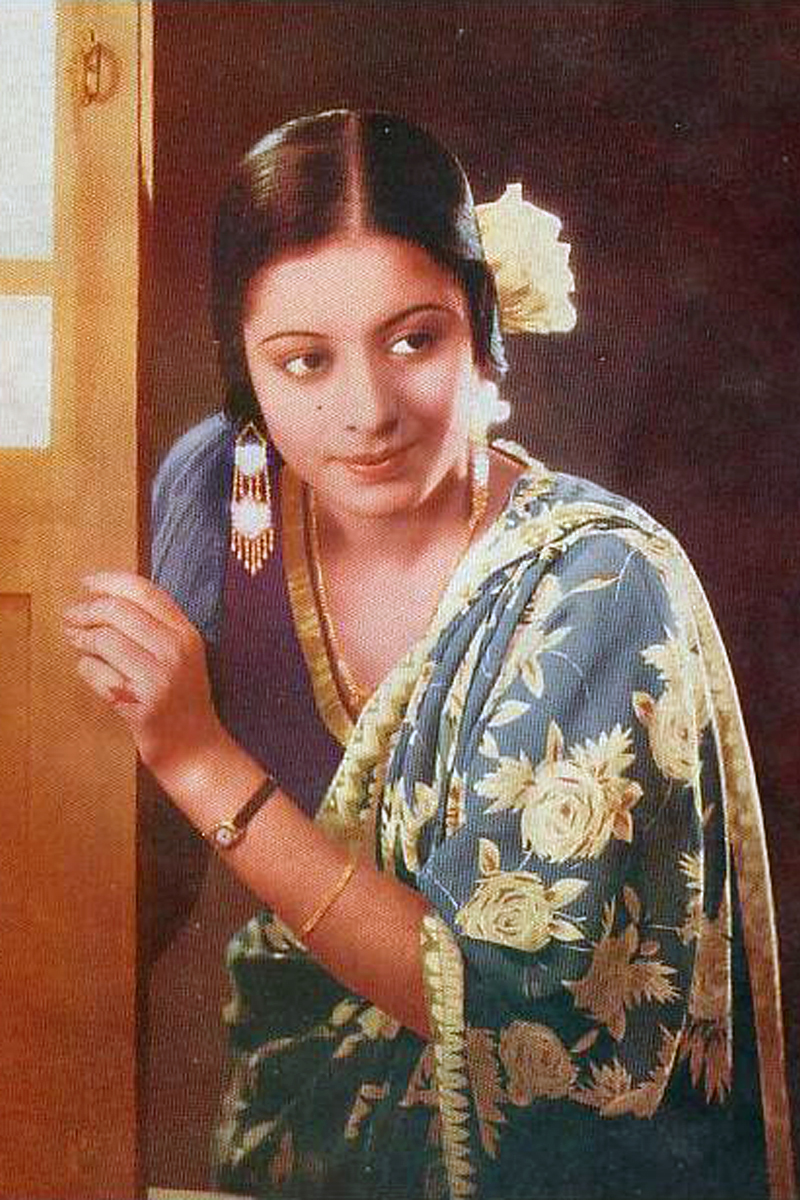
Kanan Devi

Year	Name	Debut film
1930	Sabita Devi	Kamaner Aagun
1930	Nalini Tarkhad	Vasantsena
1931	Durga Khote	Farebi Jaal
1931	Esther Victoria Abraham	Toofani Tiruni
1931	Kajjanbai	Shirin Farhad
1931	Khursheed Bano	Eye for an eye
1931	Bibbo	Alam Ara
1932	Firoza Begum	Bewafa Qatil
1932	Lalita Pawar	Kailash
1933	Sardar Akhtar	Id Ka Chand
1933	Devika Rani	Karma
1933	Rattan Bai	Yahudi Ki Ladki
1933	Umasashi	Puran Bhagat
1934	Shanta Apte	Amrit Manthan
1934	Shyama Zutshi	Shiv Bhakti
1935	Fearless Nadia	Hunterwali
1935	Shobhna Samarth	Nigahe Nafrat
1935	Jaddanbai	Talashe Haq
1935	Leela Chitnis	Shri Satyanarayan
1935	Naseem Banu	Khoon Ka Khoon
1935	Ashalata Biswas	Azadi
1936	Jamuna Barua	Das
1937	Kanan Devi	Vidyapati
1937	Mohini	Devdas
1937	T. R. Rajakumari	Devdas
1937	Leela Desai	President
1937	Renuka Devi	Jeevan Prabhat
1938	Sitara Devi	Watan
1939	Ramola Devi	Dil Hi To Hai
1939	Shamim Bano	Baaghi

== 1940s ==
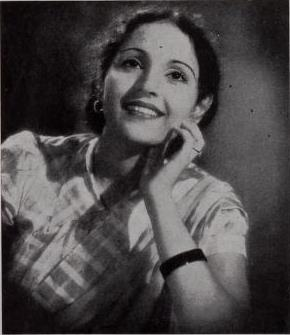
Shobhna Samarth

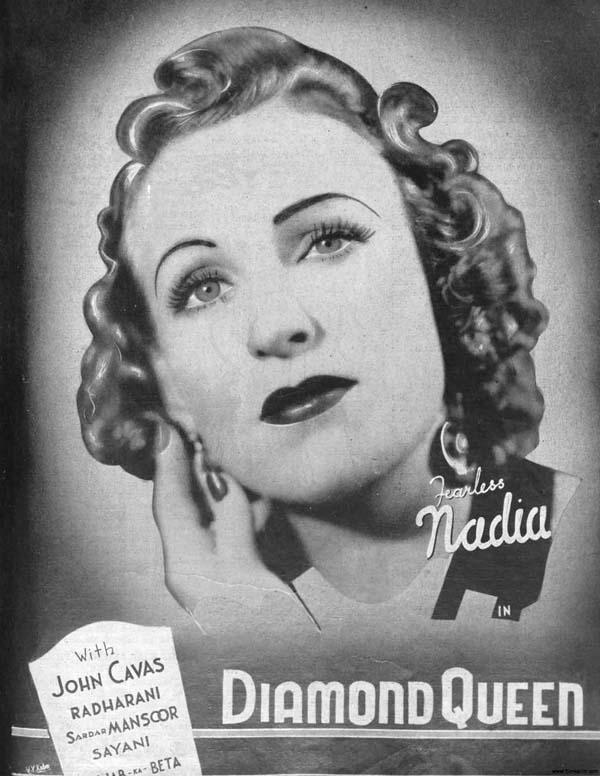
Fearless Nadia

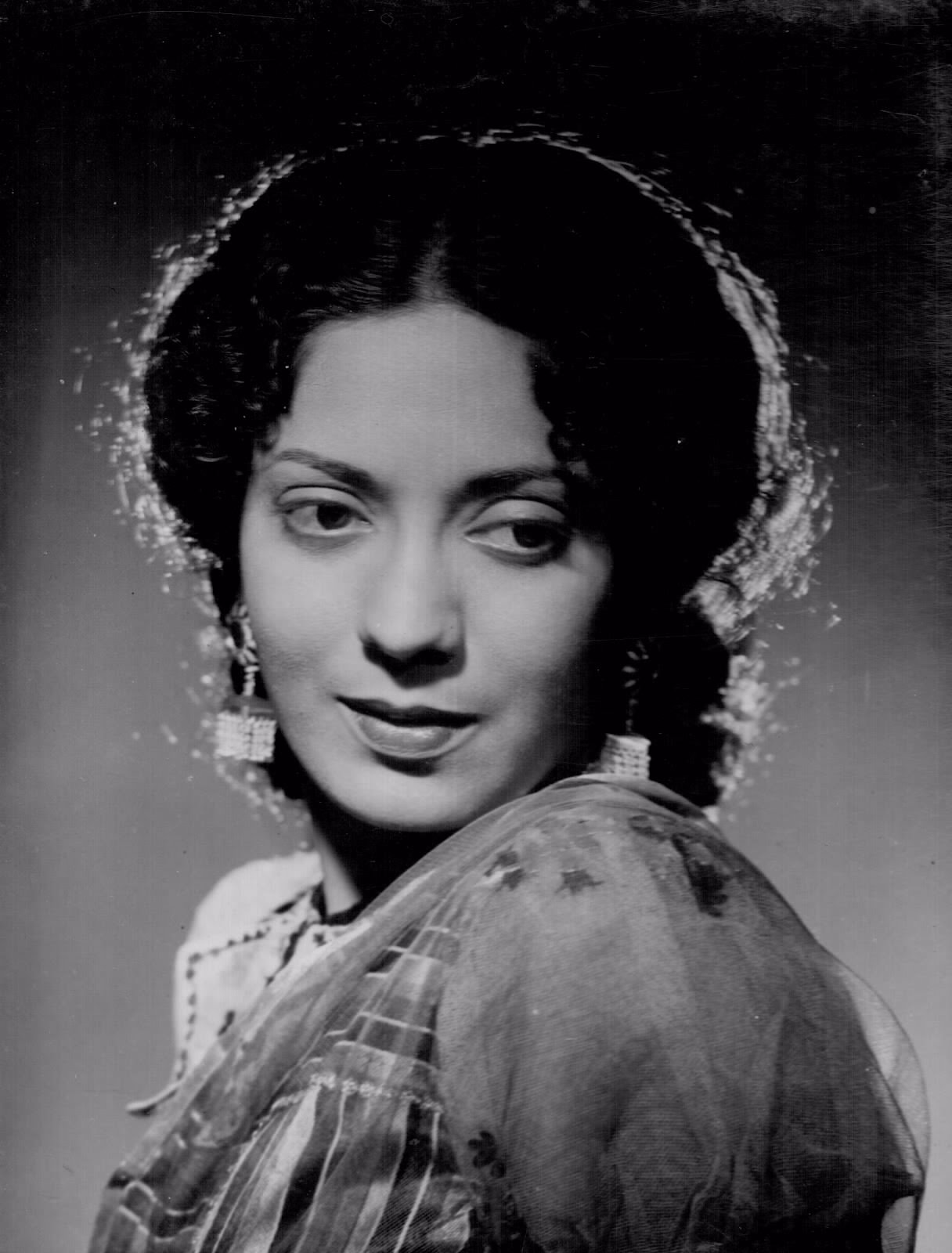
Leela Chitnis

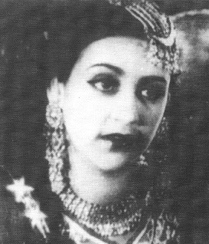
Naseem Banu

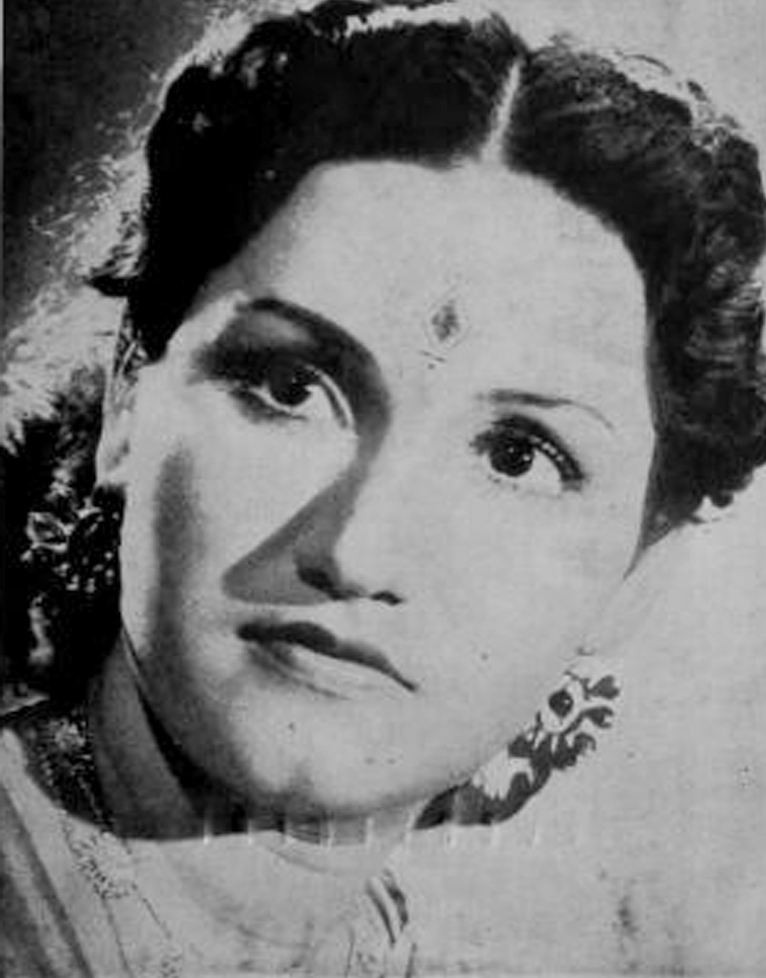
Noor Jehan

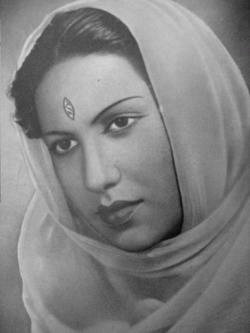
Swaran Lata

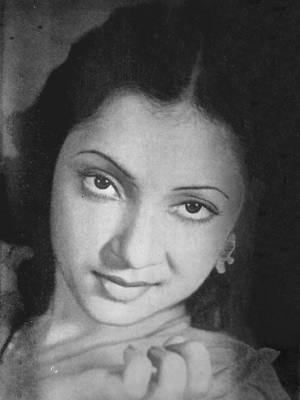
Mumtaz Shanti

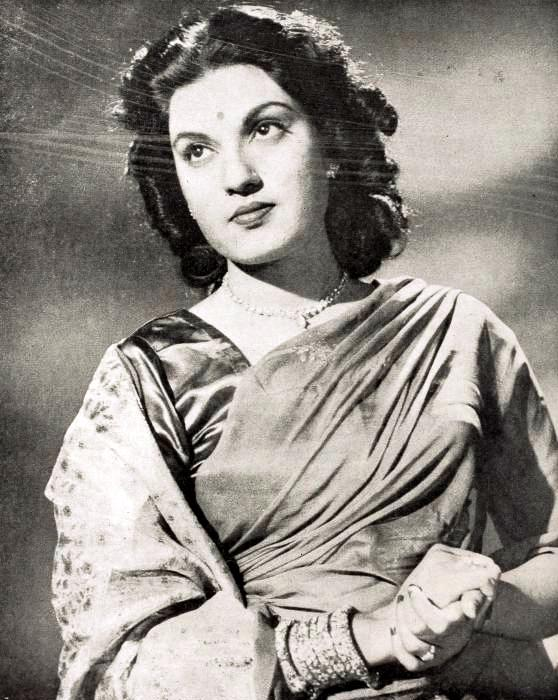
Munawar Sultana

Year	Name	Debut film	Notable films
1940	Sadhana Bose	Kumkum The Dancer	
1940	Snehprabha Pradhan	Civil Marriage	Punar Milan (1940), Khilona (1942)
1941	Nalini Jaywant	Bahen	Sangram (1950), Nastik (1954), Kala Pani (1958)
1941	Ragni	Himmat	Poonji (1943), Shahjehan (1946)
1941	Dulari	Bahen	Teesri Kasam (1966), Padosan (1968)
1941	Manorama	Khazanchi	Do Kaliyaan (1968), Ek Phool Do Maali (1969), Seeta Aur Geeta (1972)
1942	Noor Jehan	Khandaan	Zeenat, Anmol Ghadi (1946), Jugnu (1947), Mirza Sahibaan (1947)
1942	Sulochana Latkar	Marvi	
1942	Meena Shorey	Phir Milenge	
1942	Veena	Garib	Pakeezah (1972)
1942	Swaran Lata	Awaaz	Rattan (1944), Preet (1945), Laila Majnu (1945), Pratima, (1945), Wamaq Azra (1946), Sham Savera (1946), Maa Baap Ki Laaj (1946)
1942	Mumtaz Shanti	Basant	Kismet (1943), Dharti Ke Lal (1946), Ghar Ki Izzat (1948)
1942	Sulochana Chatterjee	Shobha	Aaina (1944), Shahjehan (1946)
1942	Neena	Ek Raat	
1942	Kamla Chatterjee	Aankh Michouli	Bhanwara (1944)
1943	Suraiya	Ishaara	Tadbir (1943), Phool (1945), Anmol Ghadi (1946), Omar Khaiyyam (1946), Parwana (1947), Dard (1947), Shair (1949), Dastan (1950), Afsar (1950), Diwana (1952), Bilwamangal (1954), Mr. Lambu (1956)
1943	Nargis	Taqdeer	Barsaat (1949), Awaara (1951), Shree 420 (1955), Chori Chori (1956), Mother India (1957), Raat Aur Din (1967)
1944	Begum Para	Chand	Neel Kamal (1947)
1944	Sumitra Devi	Meri Bahen	Mashaal (1950), Diwana (1952), Mamta (1952)
1944	Geeta Nizami	Man Ki Jeet	Panna (1944)
1945	Munawar Sultana	Pehli Nazar	Dard (1947), Elaan (1947) Kaneez (1947), Babul (1950)
1945	Asha Posley	Champa	
1946	Kamala Kotnis	Hum Ek Hain	Aage Badho (1949), Seedha Raasta (1949)
1946	Rehana	Hum Ek Hain	Saajan (1947), Sargam (1950)
1946	Meena Kumari	Bachchon Ka Khel	Baiju Bawra (1952), Parineeta (1953), Dil Apna Aur Preet Parai (1960), Sahib Bibi Aur Ghulam (1962), Kaajal (1965), Pakeezah (1972)
1946	Geeta Bali	Badnami	Sohag Raat (1948), Bawre Nain (1950), Albela (1951), Baazi (1951), Jaal (1952), Anand Math (1952), Vachan (1955), Milap (1955), Faraar (1955), Jailor (1958)
1947	Shashikala	Jugnu	
1947	Madhubala	Neel Kamal	Neel Kamal (1947), Mahal (1949), Badal (1951), Tarana (1951), Amar (1954), Mr. & Mrs. '55 (1955), Chalti Ka Naam Gaadi (1958), Howrah Bridge (1958), Kala Pani (1958), Barsaat Ki Raat (1960), Mughal-e-Azam (1960), Half Ticket (1962)
1948	Cuckoo Moray	Anokhi Ada	
1948	Nigar Sultana	Shikayat	Patanga (1949), Yahudi (1958), Mughal-E-Azam (1960)
1948	Uma Anand	Neecha Nagar	
1948	Kamini Kaushal	Neecha Nagar	Shaheed (1948), Nadiya Ke Paar (1948), Aarzoo (1950), Kabir Singh (2019)
1949	Nimmi	Barsaat	Deedar (1951), Aan (1952), Basant Bahar (1956)
1949	Shakila	Duniya	
1949	Shammi	Ustad Pedro	Sangdil (1952)
1949	Bhanumathi Ramakrishna	Nishan	
1949	Shyama	Shabnam	Sazaa (1951), Tarana (1951), Aar Paar (1954), Sharada (1957), Barsaat Ki Raat (1960), Zabak (1961), Milan (1967)

== 1950s ==
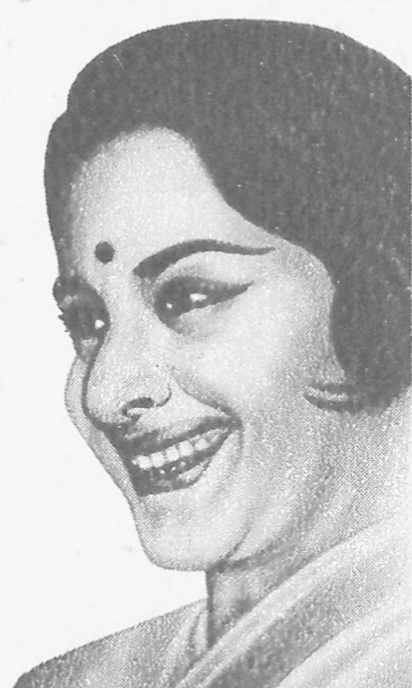
Nargis

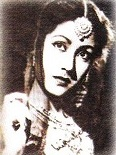
Meena Kumari

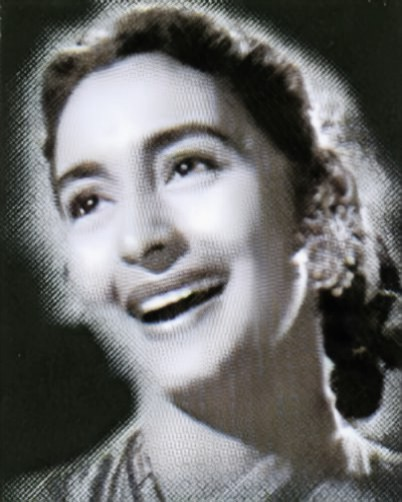
Nutan

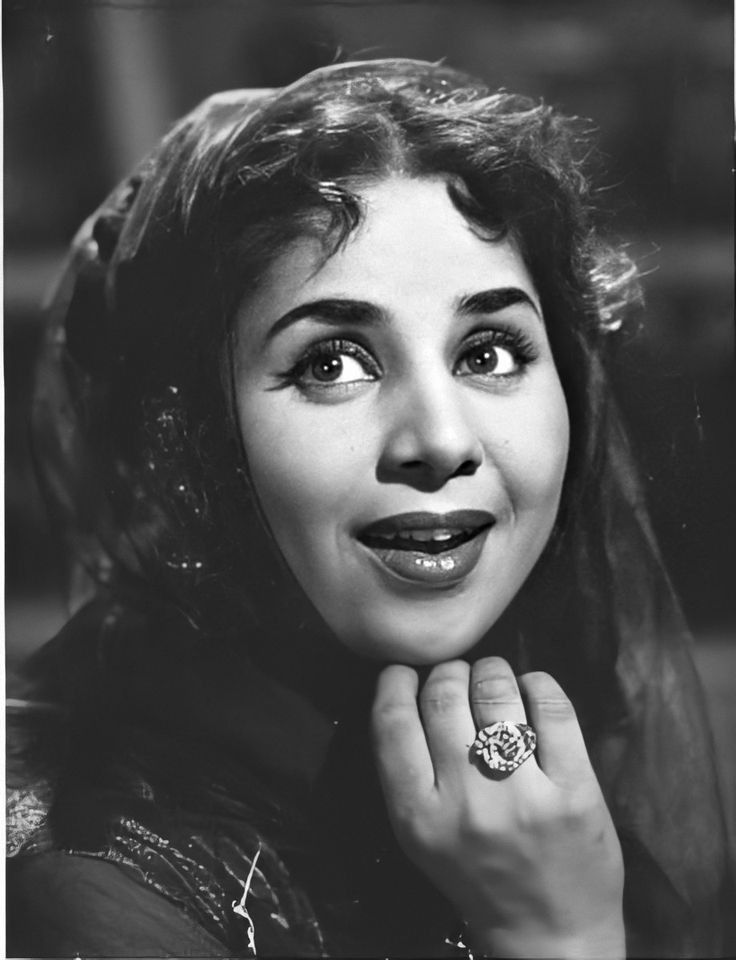
Geeta Bali

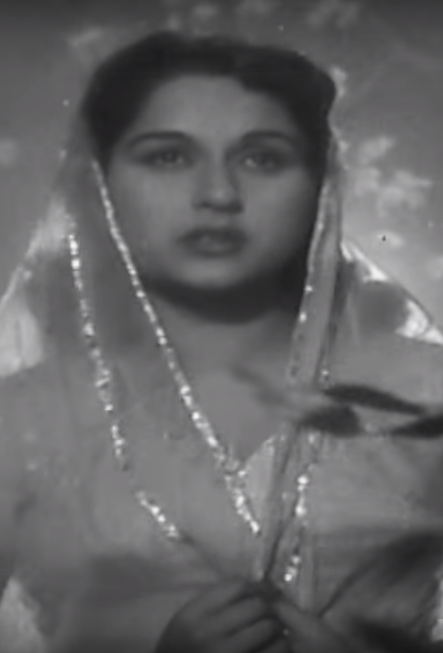
Bina Rai

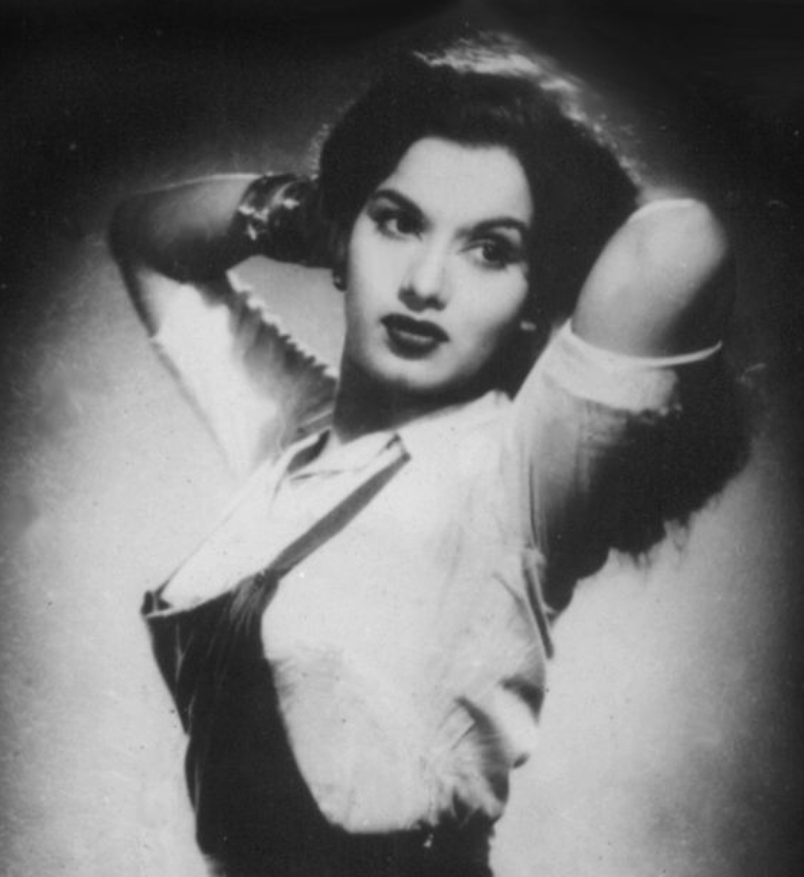
Shyama

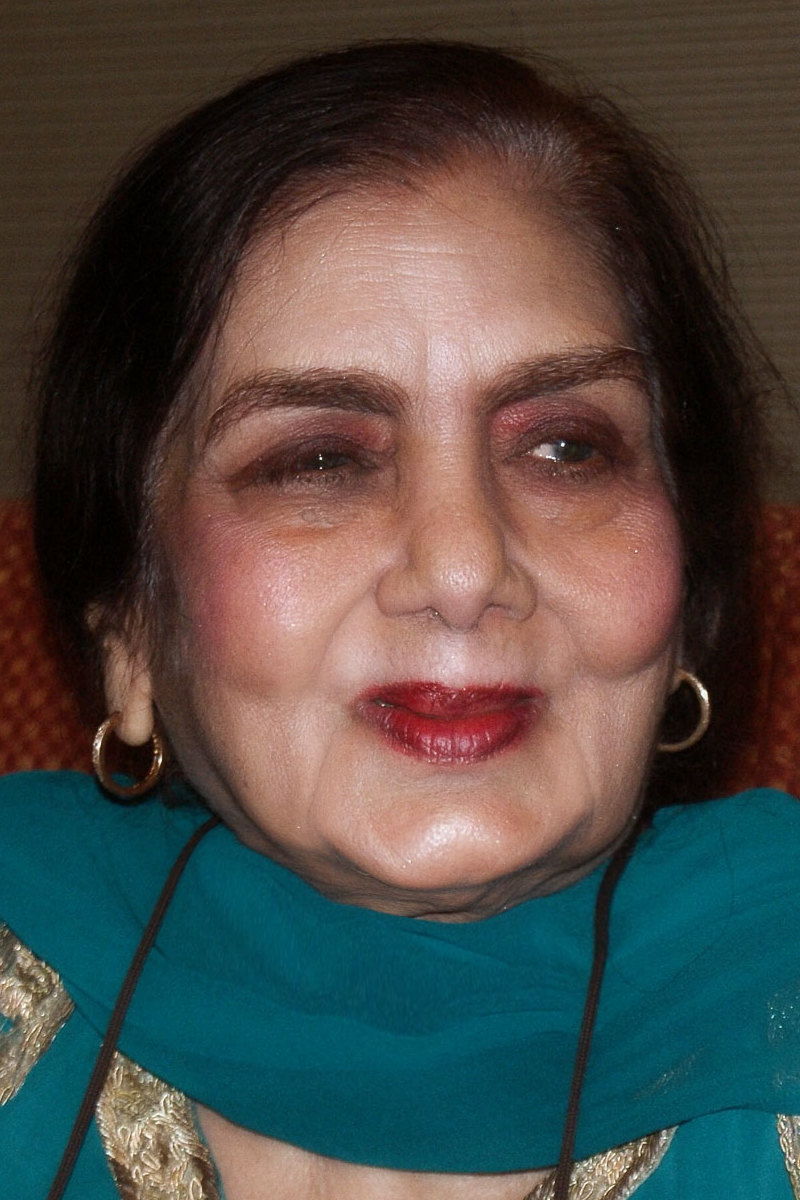
Nimmi

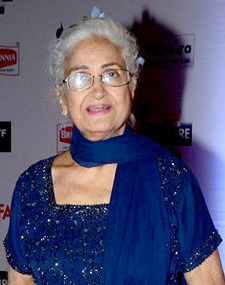
Kamini Kaushal

Year	Name	Debut film	Notable Films
1950	Nirupa Roy	Har Har Mahadev	Deewaar (1975)
1950	Nutan	Hamari Beti	Seema (1955), Sujata (1959), Bandini (1963), Milan (1967), Main Tulsi Tere Aangan Ki (1978), Meri Jung (1985)
1951	Kalpana Kartik	Baazi	
1951	Vyjayanthimala	Bahar	Nagin (1954), Devdas (1955), Naya Daur (1957), Sadhna (1958), Madhumati (1958), Gunga Jumna (1961), Sangam (1964), Suraj, Amrapali (1966), Jewel Thief (1967)
1951	Pandari Bai	Bahar	Bhabhi (1957)
1951	Bina Rai	Kali Ghata	Anarkali (1953), Ghunghat (1960), Taj Mahal (1963)
1952	Nadira	Aan	
1952	Padmini	Mr. Sampat	Amar Deep (1958), Raj Tilak (1958), Jis Desh Mein Ganga Behti Hai (1960), Mera Naam Joker (1970)
1953	Sandhya	Teen Batti Char Raasta	
1953	Ameeta	Shri Chaitanya Mahaprabhu	
1954	Mala Sinha	Badshah	Pyasa (1957), Dhool Ka Phool (1959), Himalay Ki God Mein (1965), Geet (1970)
1954	Chand Burke	Boot Polish	
1954	Chitra	Chor Bazar	Zimbo (1958)
1955	Suchitra Sen	Devdas	Mamta (1966), Aandhi (1975)
1956	Waheeda Rehman	C.I.D.	Pyaasa (1957), Kaagaz Ke Phool (1959), Chaudhvin Ka Chand (1960), Sahib Bibi Aur Ghulam (1962), Guide (1965), Neel Kamal (1968), Reshma Aur Shera (1971)
1956	Helen	Halaku	
1956	Anjali Devi	Devta	
1957	Sukumari	Payal	Anokha Rishta (1986), Kabhi Na Kabhi (1998)
1958	Kamini Kadam	Talaq	
1959	Minoo Mumtaz	Black Cat	
1959	Asha Parekh	Dil Deke Dekho	Jab Pyar Kisi Se Hota Hai (1961), Teesri Manzil ( 1966), Chirag (1969), Kati Patang (1971), Caravan (1971), Main Tulsi Tere Aangan Ki (1978)
1959	B. Saroja Devi	Paigham	Sasural (1961), Opera House (1961), Pyar Kiya to Darna Kya (1963)
1959	Nanda	Chhoti Bahen	Hum Dono (1961), Jab Jab Phool Khile (1965), Gumnaam (1965), Ittefaq (1969), The Train (1970), Prem Rog (1982)

== 1960s ==
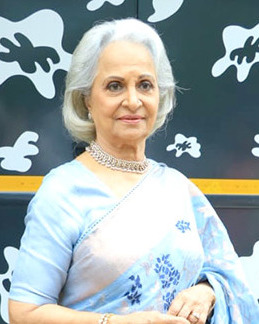
Waheeda Rehman

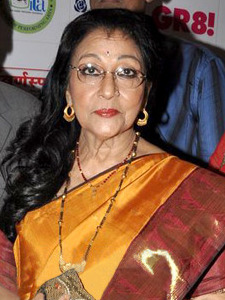
Mala Sinha

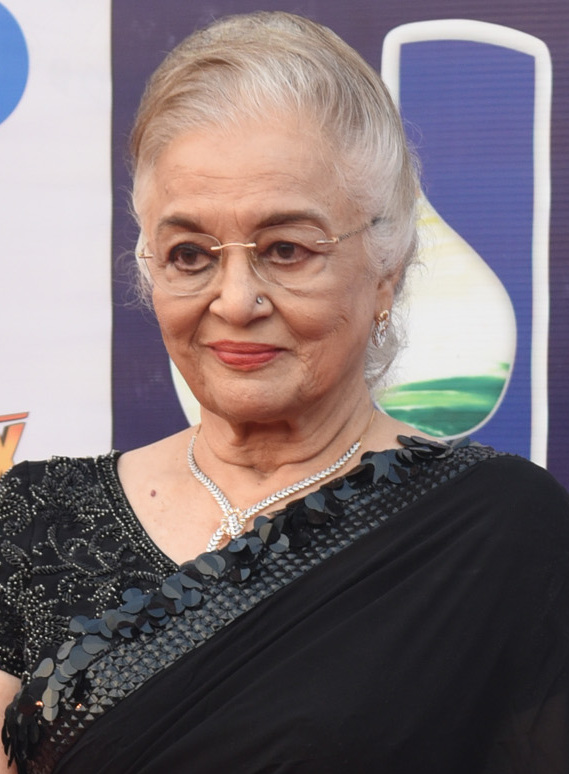
Asha Parekh

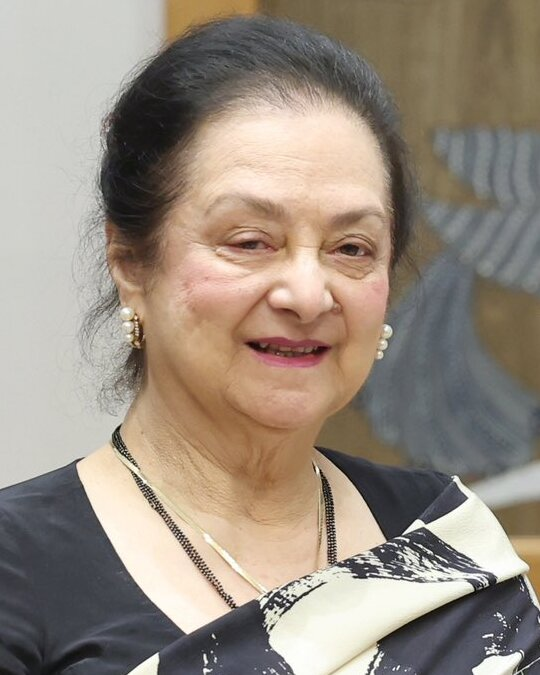
Saira Banu

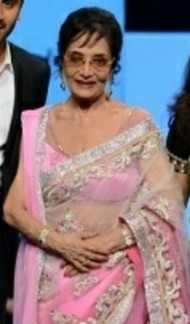
Sadhana

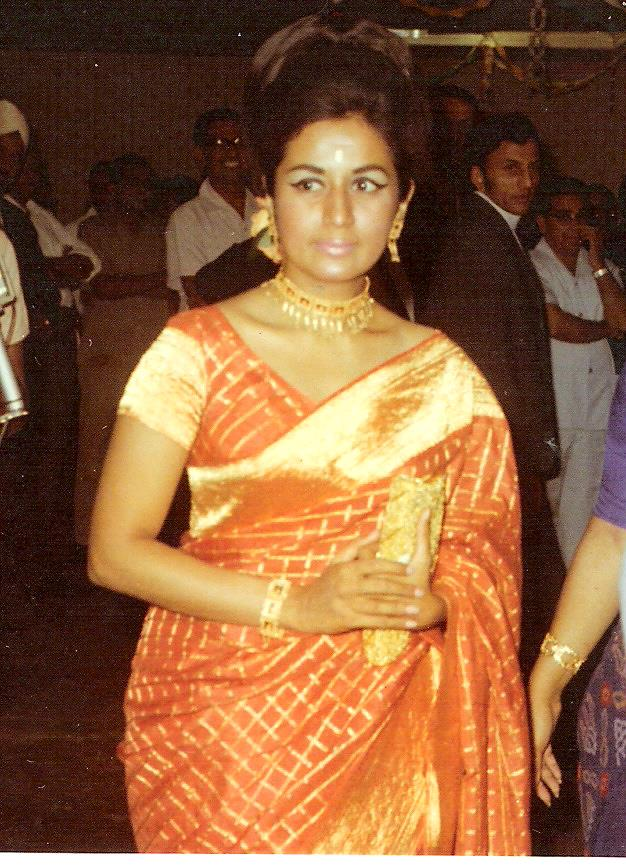
Nanda

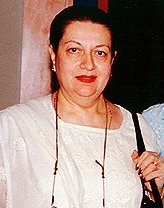
Babita

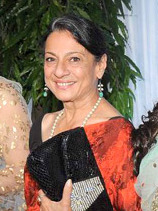
Tanuja

Year	Name	Debut film	Notable films
1960	Sadhana	Love in Shimla	Hum Dono (1961), Mere Mehboob (1963), Woh Kaun Thi? (1964), Waqt (1965), Mera Saaya (1966), Ek Phool Do Mali (1969)
1960	Tanuja	Chhabili	Chand Aur Suraj (1965), Baharen Phir Bhi Aayengi (1966), Nai Roshni (1967), Jeene Ki Raah (1969), Jewel Thief (1967), Haathi Mere Saathi (1971), Mere Jeevan Saathi (1972)
1960	Kumari Naaz	Mera Ghar Mere Bachche	Sachaa Jhutha (1970)
1961	Saira Banu	Junglee	Bluff Master (1963), Padosan (1968), Hera Pheri (1976)
1961	Mumtaz	Stree	Ram Aur Shyam (1967), Brahmachari (1968), Aadmi Aur Insaan (1969), Do Raaste (1969), Khilona (1970), Loafer (1973)
1961	Aruna Irani	Gunga Jumna	Bobby (1973), Beta (1992), Suhaag (1994)
1962	Leela Naidu	Anuradha	
1962	Simi Garewal	Son of India	Do Badan (1966), Saathi (1968), Mera Naam Joker (1970), Siddhartha (1972), Karz (1980)
1962	Bindu	Anpadh	Ittefaq (1969), Do Raaste (1969), Dastaan (1972), Abhimaan (1973), Hawas (1974), Imtihan (1974)
1963	Rajshree	Grahasti	
1963	Jamuna	Ek Raaz	
1964	Savitri	Ganga Ki Lahren	
1964	L. Vijayalakshmi	Shabnam	Alibaba Aur 40 Chor (1966)
1964	Sharmila Tagore	Kashmir Ki Kali	Anupama(1966), An Evening in Paris (1967), Aradhana (1969), Satyakam (1969), Safar (1970), Amar Prem (1972), Daag: A Poem of Love (1973), Aavishkar (1974), Chupke Chupke (1975), Mausam (1975),Namkeen (1982), Viruddh (2005),Gulmohar (2023)
1966	Babita	Dus Lakh	Raaz (1967), Haseena Maan Jayegi (1968), Banphool (1971),
1967	Vimi	Hamraaz	
1968	Hema Malini	Sapno Ka Saudagar	Seeta Aur Geeta (1972), Sholay (1975), Dream Girl (1977), Satte Pe Satta (1982), Baghban (2003), Veer-Zaara (2004)
1968	J.Jayalalithaa	Izzat	Man-Mauji (1962)
1968	Sowcar Janaki	Teen Bahuraniyan	
1968	Jayanthi	Teen Bahuraniyan	
1968	Kanchana	Teen Bahuraniyan	
1969	Leena Chandavarkar	Man Ka Meet	
1969	Poonam Sinha	Jigri dost	

== 1970s ==
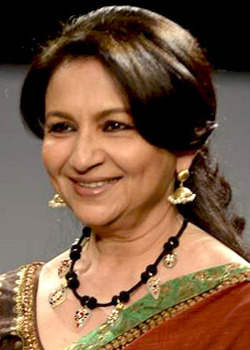
Sharmila Tagore

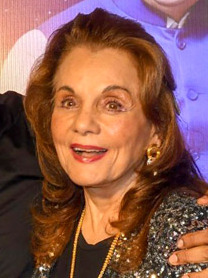
Mumtaz

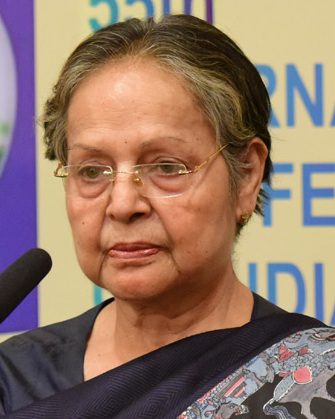
Rakhee Gulzar

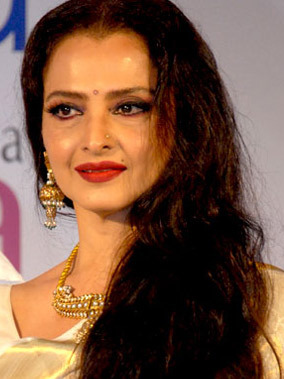
Rekha

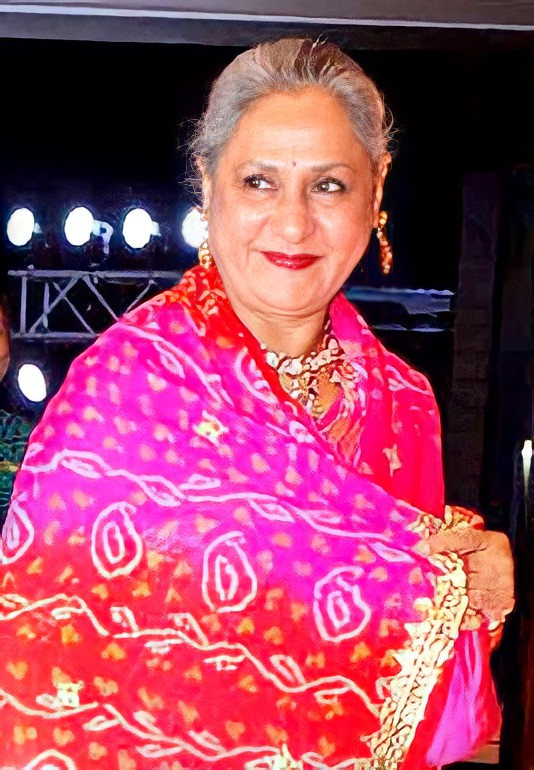
Jaya Bachchan

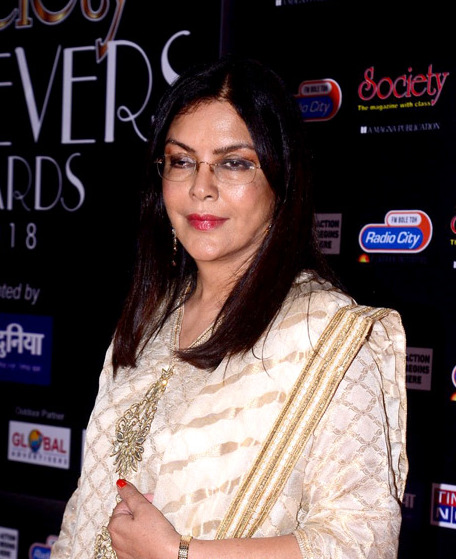
Zeenat Aman

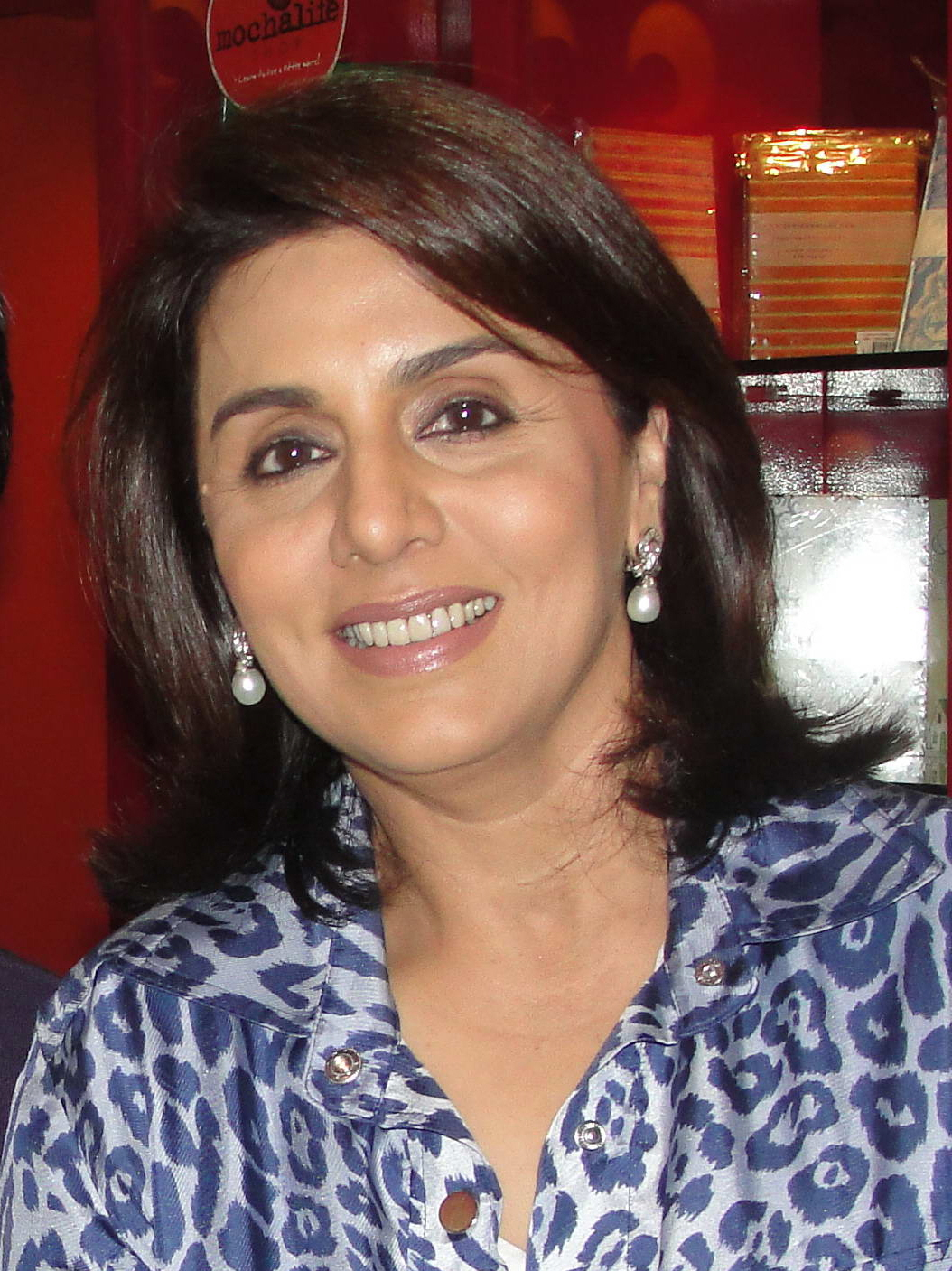
Neetu Singh

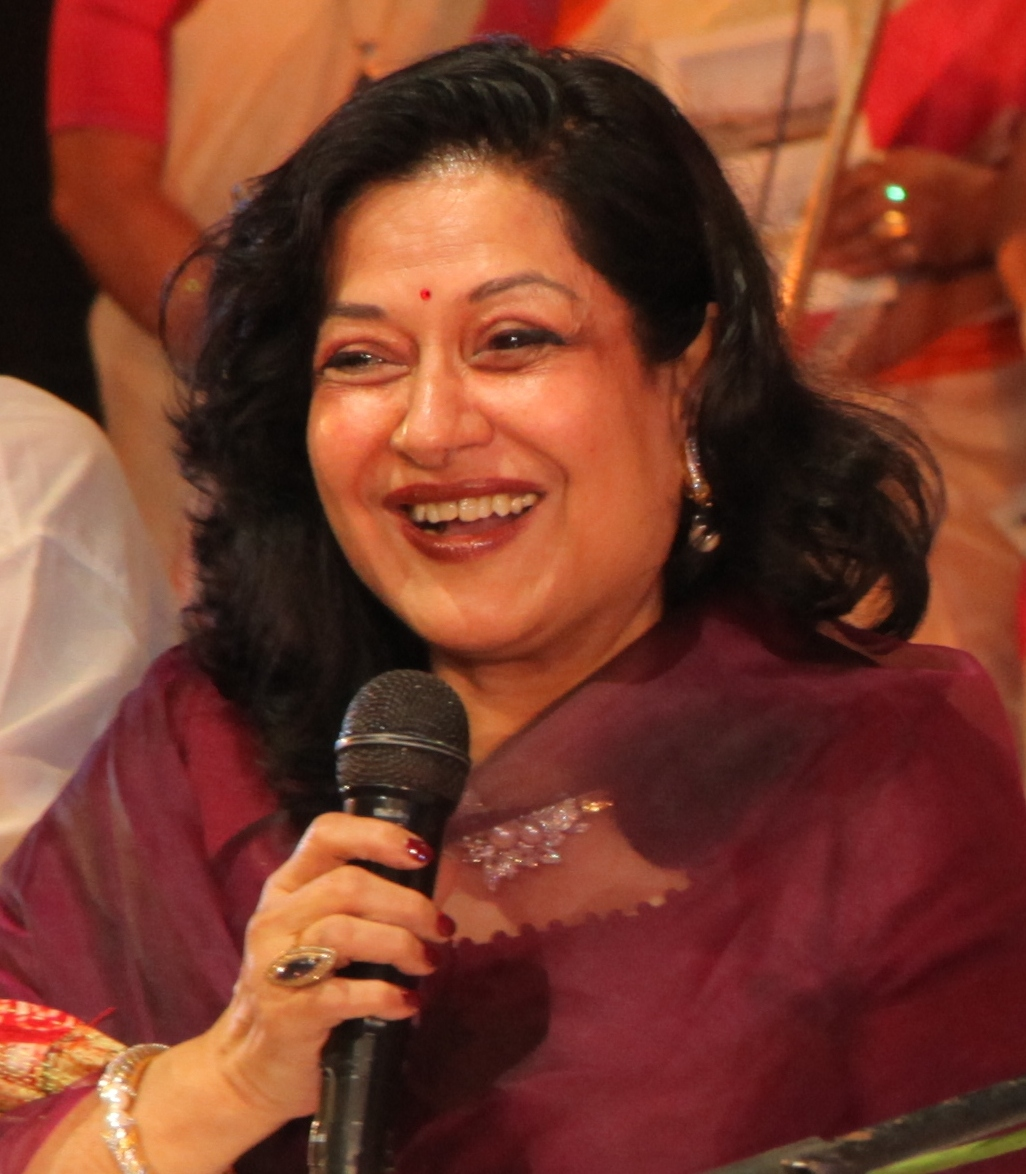
Moushumi Chatterjee

Year	Name	Debut film	Notable films
1970	Rekha	Sawan Bhadon	Ghar (1978), Muqaddar Ka Sikandar (1978), Khubsoorat (1980), Kalyug (1981), Silsila (1981), Umrao Jaan (1981), Khoon Bhari Maang (1988), Khiladiyon Ka Khiladi (1996), Lajja (2001), Koi... Mil Gaya (2003), Krrish (2006)
1970	Rakhee Gulzar	Jeevan Mrityu	Aankhon Aankhon Mein (1972), Daag: A Poem of Love (1973), Tapasya (1976), Kabhi Kabhie (1976), Muqaddar Ka Sikandar (1978), Kaala Patthar (1979), Barsaat Ki Ek Raat (1981), Shakti (1982), Ram Lakhan (1989), Karan Arjun (1996)
1971	Jaya Bachchan	Guddi	Abhimaan (1973), Sholay (1975), Fiza (2000), Kabhi Khushi Kabhie Gham (2001), Kal Ho Naa Ho (2003), Rocky Aur Rani Kii Prem Kahaani (2023)
1971	Farida Jalal	Laal Patthar	Henna (1991), Mammo (1994), DDLJ (1995)
1971	Zeenat Aman	Hare Rama Hare Krishna	Yaadon Ki Baaraat (1973), Roti Kapada Aur Makaan (1974), Don (1978), Satyam Shivam Sundaram (1979), Qurbani (1980), Laawaris (1981)
1971	Yogeeta Bali	Parwana	
1972	Reena Roy	Zaroorat	Nagin (1976), Aasha (1980), Sanam Teri Kasam (1982)
1972	Moushumi Chatterjee	Anuraag	Roti Kapada Aur Makaan (1974), Swarg Narak (1978), Manzil (1979), Angoor (1982)
1973	Dimple Kapadia	Bobby	Saagar (1985), Kaash (1987), Lekin... (1991), Rudaali (1993), Dil Chahta Hai (2001), Luck by Chance (2009)
1973	Parveen Babi	Charitra	Majboor (1974), Deewaar (1975), Amar Akbar Anthony (1977), Kaala Patthar (1979), Kaalia (1981), Namak Halaal (1982)
1973	Neetu Singh	Rickshawala	Deewaar (1975), Kabhie Kabhie (1976), Doosra Aadmi (1977), Kaala Patthar (1979), Do Dooni Chaar (2010), Jugjugg Jeeyo (2022)
1974	Shabana Azmi	Ankur	Sparsh (1980), Arth (1982), Masoom (1983), Khandhar (1984), Godmother (1999), Rocky Aur Rani Kii Prem Kahaani (2023)
1974	Vidya Sinha	Rajnigandha	
1974	Zarina Wahab	Ishq Ishq Ishq	
1975	Smita Patil	Charandas Chor	Bhumika (1977), Chakra (1981), Namak Halaal (1982), Bazaar (1982), Arth (1982), Mirch Masala (1985)
1975	Sarika	Geet Gaata Chal	
1975	Sulakshana Pandit	Uljhan	Raaja (1975)
1975	Lakshmi	Julie	
1976	Ranjeeta	Laila Majnu	Ankhiyon Ke Jharokhon Se (1978), Aap To Aise Na The (1980)
1976	Bindiya Goswami	Jeevan Jyoti	
1976	Shoma Anand	Barood	Coolie (1983), Hungama (2003)
1978	Debashree Roy	Ghata	Jiyo To Aise Jiyo (1981), Kabhie Ajnabi The (1985), Hindustani Sipahi (2002)
1978	Poonam Dhillon	Trishul	Noorie (1979), Yeh Vaada Raha (1982), Naam (1986)
1978	Deepti Naval	Junoon	Chashme Buddoor (1981), Kamla (1984), Ankahee (1985)
1979	Tina Munim	Des Pardes	Karz (1980), Rocky (1981), Alag Alag (1985), Adhikar (1986)
1979	Jayasudha	Shabhash Daddy	Sooryavansham (1999)
1979	Deepa	Amar Deep	
1979	Jaya Prada	Sargam	Kaamchor (1982), Sharabi (1984), Tohfa (1984), Sanjog (1985), Swarag Se Sunder (1986), Aaj Ka Arjun (1990)
1979	Reema Lagoo	Sinhasan	Maine Pyar Kiya (1989), Aashiqui (1990), Hum Aapke Hain Koun..! (1994), Vaastav: The Reality (1999)
1979	Sridevi	Solva Sawan	Sadma (1983), Himmatwala (1983), Tohfa (1984), Maqsad (1984), Nagina (1986), Mr. India (1987), ChaalBaaz (1989), Chandni (1989), Lamhe (1991), Laadla (1994), Judaai (1997), English Vinglish (2012), Mom (2017)

== 1980s ==
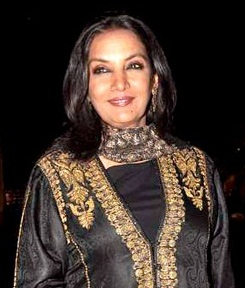
Shabana Azmi

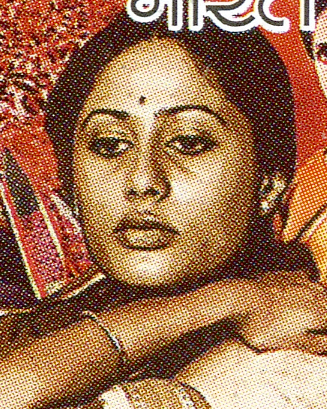
Smita Patil

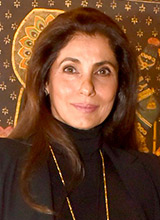
Dimple Kapadia

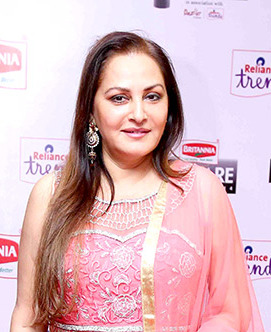
Jaya Prada

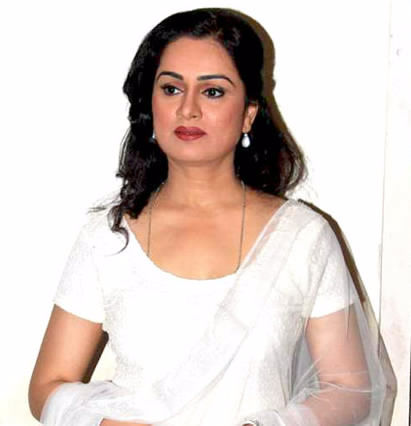
Padmini Kolhapure

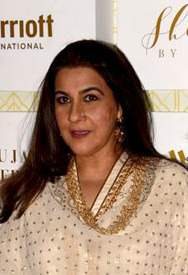
Amrita Singh

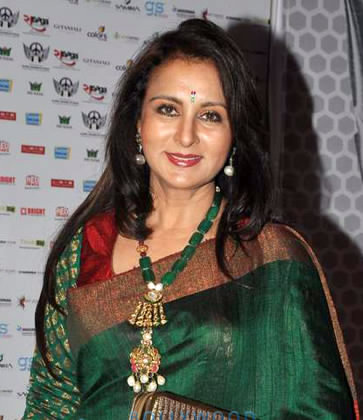
Poonam Dhillon

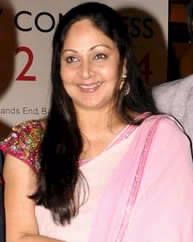
Rati Agnihotri

Year	Name	Debut film	Other notable films
1980	Padmini Kolhapure	Insaf Ka Tarazu	Zamane Ko Dikhana Hai (1981), Ahista Ahista (1981), Prem Rog (1982), Vidhaata (1982), Souten (1983), Pyar Jhukta Nahin (1985)
1981	Anita Raj	Prem Geet	
1981	Poornima Jayaram	Dard	
1981	Soni Razdan	36 Chowringhee Lane	Mandi (1983), Saaransh (1984), Such a Long Journey (1998), Yours Truly (2018)
1981	Rati Agnihotri	Ek Duuje Ke Liye	Farz Aur Kanoon (1982), Tawaif (1985), Hukumat (1987), Hum Tum (2004)
1981	Madhavi	Ek Duuje Ke Liye	Satyamev Jayate (1987), Pyaar Ka Mandir (1988), Agneepath (1990)
1981	Geetha	Ek Duuje Ke Liye	Yeh Desh (1984)
1981	Vijayta Pandit	Love Story	
1981	Supriya Pathak	Kalyug	Bazaar (1982), Wake Up Sid (2009), Khichdi: The Movie (2010), Goliyon Ki Raasleela Ram-Leela (2013), Ramprasad Ki Tehrvi (2022)
1982	Salma Agha	Nikaah	Kasam Paida Karne Wale Ki (1984), Salma (1985), Pati Patni Aur Tawaif (1990)
1982	Menaka	Rajput	
1983	Meenakshi Seshadri	Painter Babu	Hero (1984), Jurm (1990), Damini (1993)
1983	Silk Smitha	Jeet Hamaari	
1983	Amrita Singh	Betaab	Saaheb (1985), Mard (1985), Naam (1986), Aaina (1993), 2 States (2014), Badla (2019)
1983	Ratna Pathak Shah	Mandi	Jaane Tu Ya Jaane Na (2008), Kapoor & Sons (2016), Lipstick Under My Burkha (2017), Nil Battey Sannata (2017), Dhak Dhak (2023)
1984	Madhuri Dixit	Abodh	Tezaab (1988), Saajan (1991), Beta (1992), Khalnayak (1993), Hum Aapke Hain Koun..! (1994), Raja (1995), Dil To Pagal Hai (1997), Pukar (2000), Lajja (2001), Devdas (2002), Aaja Nachle (2007), Dedh Ishqiya (2014), Kalank (2019)
1984	Radha	Kaamyab	
1984	Shobana	Ghar Ek Mandir	Mere Baap Pehle Aap(2008)
1984	Neelam	Jawaani	Ilzaam (1986), Aag Hi Aag (1987), Ghar Ka Chiraag (1989)
1985	Mandakini	Ram Teri Ganga Maili	Jeeva (1986), Loha (1987), Taqdeer Ka Tamasha (1990)
1985	Lissy	Saagar	
1985	Kushboo	Jaanoo	Meri Jung(1985), Patton Ki Bazi(1986), Vanvaas(2024)
1985	Kimi Katkar	Adventures of Tarzan	Hum (1991)
1986	Farha Naaz	Naseeb Apna Apna	Love 86 (1986), Woh Phir Aayegi (1988), Begunaah (1991)
1986	Radhika	Naseeb Apna Apna	Lal Baadshah (1999), Merry Christmas (2024)
1986	Sudha Chandran	Naache Mayuri	Thanedaar(1990), Kurbaan(1991), Nishchaiy(1992), Shola Aur Shabnam(1992), Anjaam(1994), Milan(1994), Malamaal Weekly(2006), Shaadi Karke Phas Gaya Yaar(2006)
1986	Juhi Chawla	Sultanat	Qayamat Se Qayamat Tak(1988) Hum Hain Rahi Pyar Ke (1993), Darr (1993), Yes Boss (1997), Ishq (1997), Gulaab Gang (2014), Ek Ladki Ko Dekha Toh Aisa Laga (2019)
1986	Bhanupriya	Dosti Dushmani	
1986	Pallavi Joshi	Amrit	Insaaf Ki Awaaz (1986), Andha Yudh (1987), Rihaee (1988), Woh Chokri (1992), The Tashkent Files (2019), The Kashmir Files (2022)
1988	Sonam	Vijay	
1988	Sumalatha	New Delhi	
1988	Urvashi	New Delhi	
1988	Amala	Dayavan	Shiva (1990), Hamari Adhuri Kahani (2015)
1988	Sangeeta Bijlani	Qatil	
1988	Sonu Walia	Khoon Bhari Maang	
1989	Nandita Das	Parinati	Fire (1996), 1947 Earth (1998), Bawandar (2000)
1989	Vijayashanti	Eeshwar	Muqaddar Ka Badshaah (1990)
1989	Roopa Ganguly	Ek Din Achanak	Bahaar Aane Tak (1990), Gopalaa (1994), Barfi! (2012)
1989	Shilpa Shirodkar	Bhrashtachar	Kishen Kanhaiya (1990), Hum (1991), Khuda Gawah (1992), Aankhen (1993), Gopi Kishan (1994), Bewafa Sanam (1995), Mrityudand (1997)
1989	Pooja Bhatt	Daddy	Dil Hai Ke Manta Nahin (1991), Sadak (1991), Phir Teri Kahani Yaad Aayee (1993), Zakhm (1998)
1989	Bhagyashree	Maine Pyar Kiya	Tyagi (1992), Janani (2006), Red Alert: The War Within (2010)

== 1990s ==
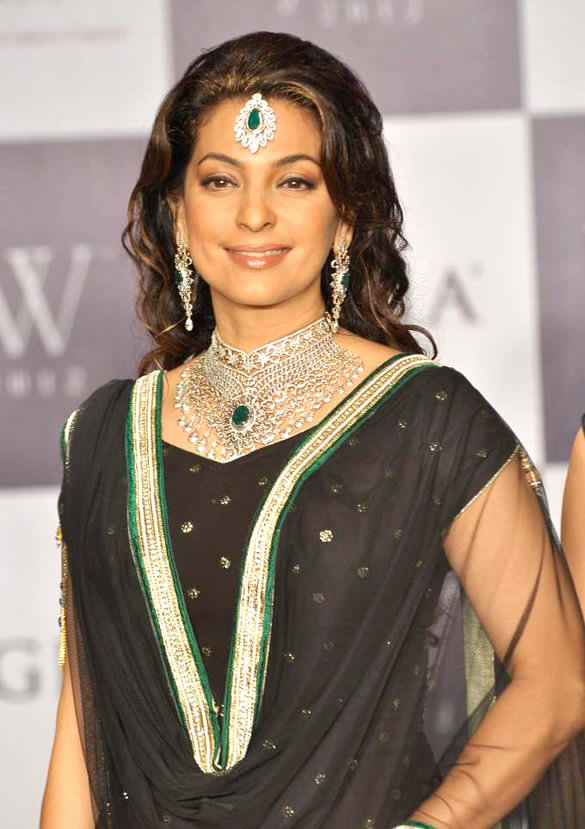
Juhi Chawla

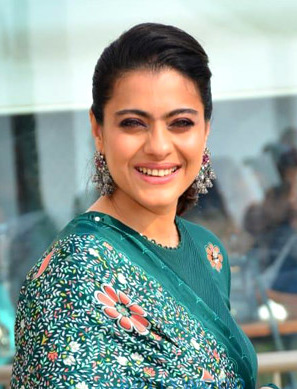
Kajol

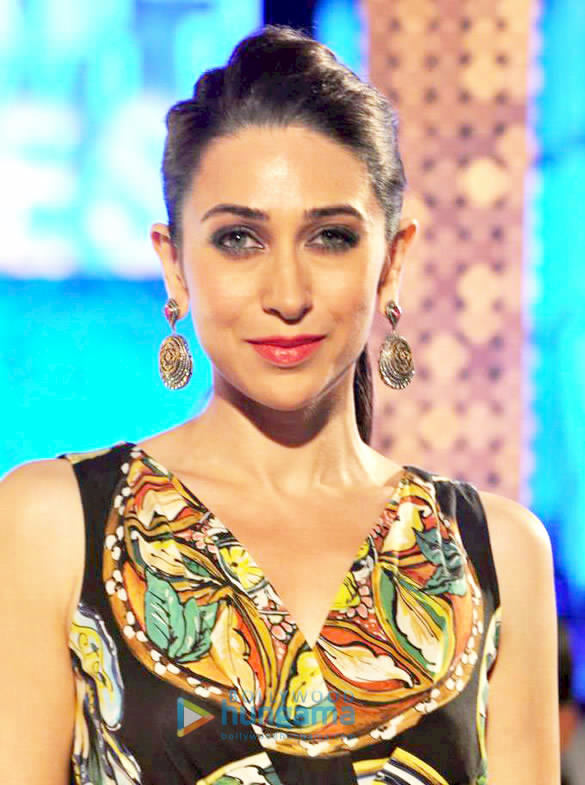
Karisma Kapoor

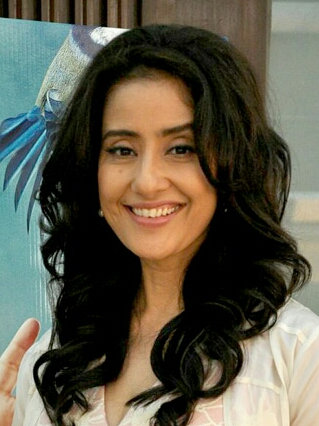
Manisha Koirala

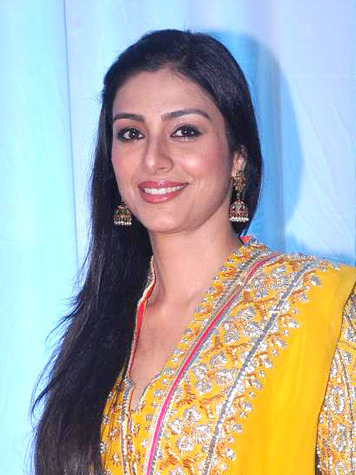
Tabu

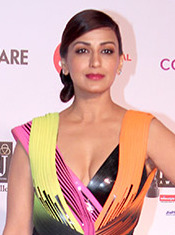
Sonali Bendre

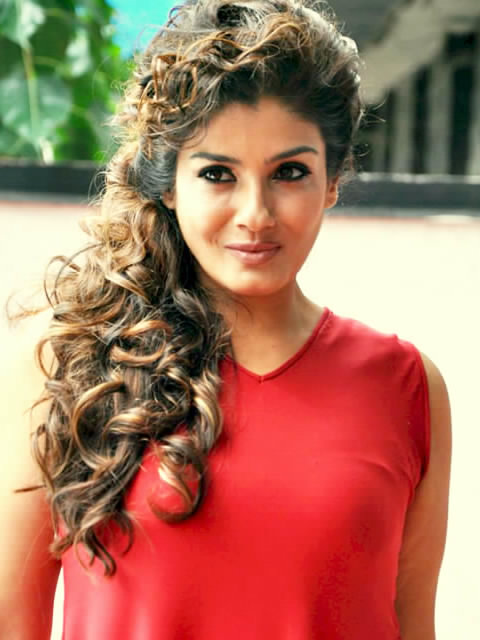
Raveena Tandon

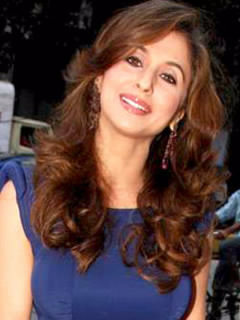
Urmila Matondkar

Year	Name	Debut film	Other notable films
1990	Anu Aggarwal	Aashiqui	King Uncle (1993), Khal-Naaikaa (1993)
1990	Nagma	Baaghi	Bewaffa Se Waffa (1992), King Uncle (1993)
1990	Rohini	Jawani Zindabad	
1991	Urmila Matondkar	Narsimha	Rangeela (1995), Judaai (1997), Satya (1998), Khoobsurat (1999), Kaun? (1999), Pyaar Tune Kya Kiya (2001), Bhoot (2003), Ek Hasina Thi (2004)
1991	Sangita	Shanti Kranti	
1991	Chandni	Sanam Bewafa	1942: A Love Story(1994)
1991	Revathy	Love	2 States (2014), Salaam Venky (2022)
1991	Gautami	Pyar Hua Chori Chori	
1991	Manisha Koirala	Saudagar	1942: A Love Story(1994), Akele Hum Akele Tum (1995), Khamoshi (1996), Gupt: The Hidden Truth (1997), Dil Se.. (1998), Kachche Dhaage (1999), Lajja (2001), Company (2002)
1991	Zeba Bakhtiyar	Heena	Stuntman (1994), Jai Vikraanta (1995)
1991	Ashwini Bhave	Heena	Meera Ka Mohan (1992), Zakhmi Dil (1994), Bandhan (1998)
1991	Madhoo	Phool Aur Kaante	Roja (1992), Ravan Raaj (1995), Diljale (1996)
1991	Karisma Kapoor	Prem Qaidi	Andaz Apna Apna (1994), Raja Hindustani (1996), Dil To Pagal Hai (1997), Hum Saath-Saath Hain (1999), Fiza (2000), Zubeidaa (2001)
1991	Raveena Tandon	Patthar Ke Phool	Mohra (1994), Dulhe Raja (1998), Bade Miyan Chote Miyan (1998), Aks (2001)
1991	Ayesha Jhulka	Kurban	Jo Jeeta Wohi Sikandar (1992), Balmaa (1993)
1991	Mamta Kulkarni	Tirangaa	Aashik Awara (1993), Karan Arjun (1995)
1992	Divya Bharti	Vishwatma	Deewana (1992), Shola Aur Shabnam (1992), Dil Ka Kya Kasoor (1992), Rang (1993),Kshatriya (1993)
1992	Pratibha Sinha	Mehboob Mere Mehboob	Tu Chor Main Sipahi (1996)
1992	Meena	Parda Hai Parda	
1992	Kajol	Bekhudi	Dilwale Dulhania Le Jayenge (1995), Gupt (1997), Kuch Kuch Hota Hai (1998), Kabhi Khushi Kabhie Gham (2001), Fanaa (2006)
1993	Shilpa Shetty	Baazigar	Main Khiladi Tu Anari (1994), Dhadkan (2000), Indian (2001), Phir Milenge (2004)
1993	Shalini	King Uncle	
1993	Tisca Chopra	Platform	Good Newwz (2019)
1993	Ramya Krishnan	Parampara	
1993	Aishwarya	Gardish	
1993	Namrata Shirodkar	Mere Do Anmol Ratan	Kachche Dhaage (1999), Vaastav: The Reality (1999), Pukar (2000)
1994	Seema Biswas	Bandit Queen	Water (2005), Vivah (2006)
1994	Anjali Jathar	Madhosh	Aazmayish (1995), Trimurti (1995)
1994	Heera Rajagopal	Amaanat	
1994	Sonali Bendre	Aag	Diljale (1996), English Babu Desi Mem (1996), Sarfarosh (1999), Hum Saath-Saath Hain (1999)
1994	Tabu	Pehla Pehla Pyar	Maachis (1996), Chandni Bar (2001), Cheeni Kum (2007), Haider (2014), Andhadhun (2018), Bhool Bhulaiyaa 2 (2023)
1994	Monica Bedi	Main Tera Aashiq	
1994	Rituparna Sengupta	Teesra Kaun?	Main, Meri Patni Aur Woh (2005), Gauri: The Unborn (2007), Life Express (2010)
1994	Suchitra Krishnamoorthi	Kabhi Haan Kabhi Naa	
1995	Twinkle Khanna	Barsaat	Jaan (1996), Jab Pyaar Kisise Hota Hai (1999), Baadshah (1999)
1995	Rambha	Jallaad	Judwaa(1997)
1995	Devayani	Dil Ka Doctor	Ajay(1996)
1995	Sakshi Shivanand	Janam Kundli	Aapko Pehle Bhi Kahin Dekha Hai(2003)
1995	Mandira Bedi	Dilwale Dulhania Le Jayenge	Saaho (2019)
1995	Shefali Shah	Rangeela	Monsoon Wedding (2001), Gandhi, My Father (2007), The Last Lear (2007), Dil Dhadakne Do (2015), Darlings (2022)
1996	Rani Mukerji	Raja Ki Aayegi Baraat	Kuch Kuch Hota Hai (1998), Veer-Zaara (2004), Black (2005), Kabhi Alvida Naa Kehna (2006), No One Killed Jessica (2011), Hichki (2018)
1996	Laila	Dushman Duniya Ka	Insan(2005)
1996	Sonali Kulkarni	Daayraa	Mission Kashmir (2000), Dr. Babasaheb Ambedkar (2000)
1996	Sushmita Sen	Dastak	Biwi No.1 (1999), Aankhen (2002), Main Hoon Na (2004), Maine Pyaar Kyun Kiya? (2005)
1996	Priya Gill	Tere Mere Sapne	Sirf Tum (1999), Josh (2000)
1996	Simran	Tere Mere Sapne	Muqaddar (1996), Anari No.1 (1999), Gulmohar (2023)
1997	Mahima Chaudhry	Pardes	Dil Kya Kare (1999), Daag (1999), Lajja (2001), Dil Hai Tumhaara (2002)
1997	Vineetha	Shapath	Shera(1999)
1997	Anjala Zaveri	Himalay Putra	Pyaar Kiya To Darna Kya(1998)
1997	Sharbani Mukherjee	Border	Ansh: The Deadly Part (2002)
1997	Aishwarya Rai	Aur Pyar Ho Gaya	Hum Dil De Chuke Sanam (1999), Taal (1999), Devdas (2002), Dhoom 2 (2006), Jodhaa Akbar (2008), Ae Dil Hai Mushkil (2016)
1997	Shwetha Menon	Prithvi	Ishq (1997), Run (2004)
1997	Pooja Batra	Vishwavidhaata	Virasat(1997),Bhai (1997), Haseena Maan Jaayegi (1999), Taj Mahal (2006)
1998	Jyothika	Doli Saja Ke Rakhna	Little John (2001), Shaitaan (2024), Srikanth (2024)
1998	Priyanka	Bada Din	Enemmy(2013)
1998	Jaswir	Soldier	Kaho Naa... Pyaar Hai(2000)
1998	Preity Zinta	Dil Se..	Kya Kehna (2000), Dil Chahta Hai (2001), Kal Ho Naa Ho (2003), Veer-Zaara (2004), Salaam Namaste (2005), Kabhi Alvida Naa Kehna (2006)
1998	Neha	Kareeb	Hogi Pyaar Ki Jeet (1999), Fiza (2000), Rahul (2001)
1998	Antara Mali	Dhoondte Reh Jaaoge!	Company (2002), Main Madhuri Dixit Banna Chahti Hoon (2003)
1999	Rinke Khanna	Pyaar Mein Kabhi Kabhi	Jish Desh Mein Ganga Rehta Hain (2000), Praan Jaye Par Shaan Na Jaye(2003), Jhankaar Beats (2003)
1999	Soundarya	Sooryavansham	
1999	Rachana Banerjee	Sooryavansham	

== 2000s ==
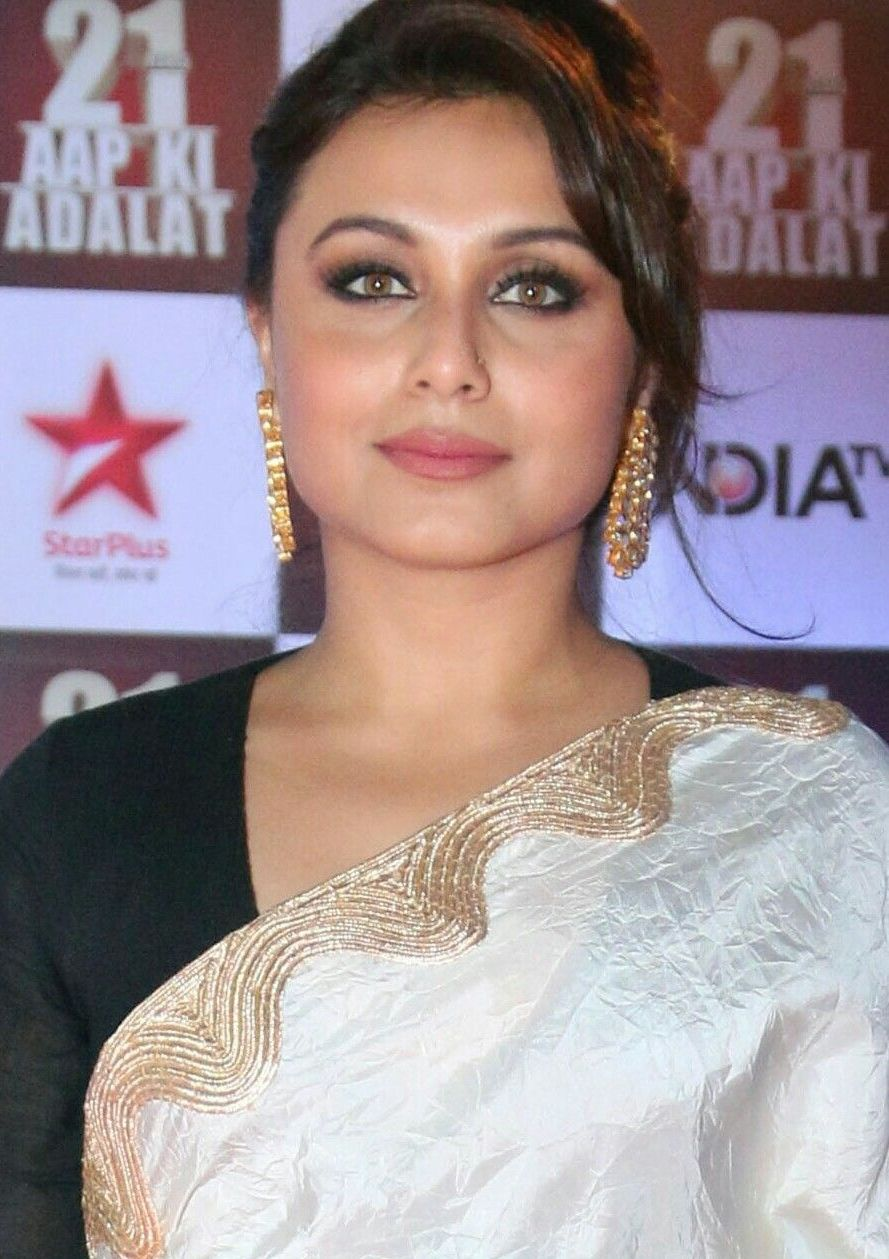
Rani Mukerji

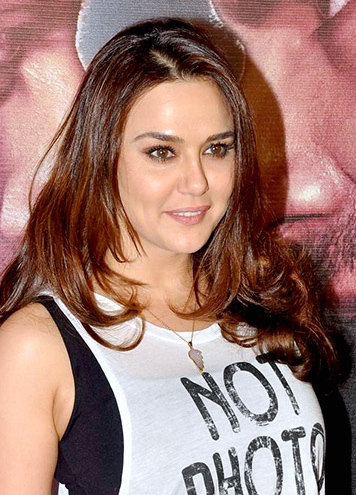
Preity Zinta

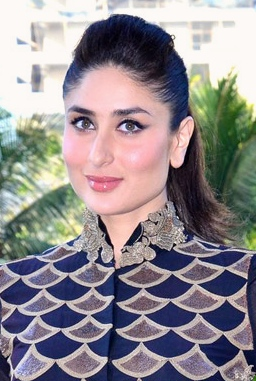
Kareena Kapoor

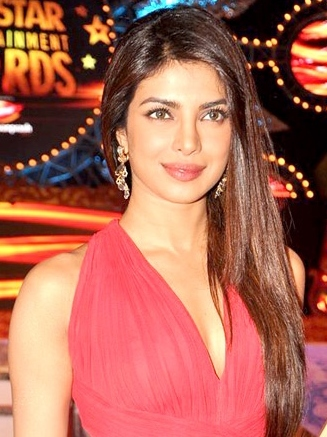
Priyanka Chopra

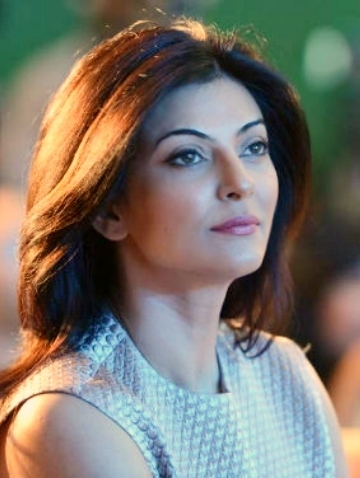
Sushmita Sen

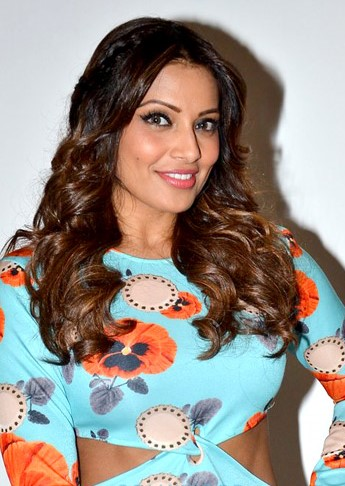
Bipasha Basu

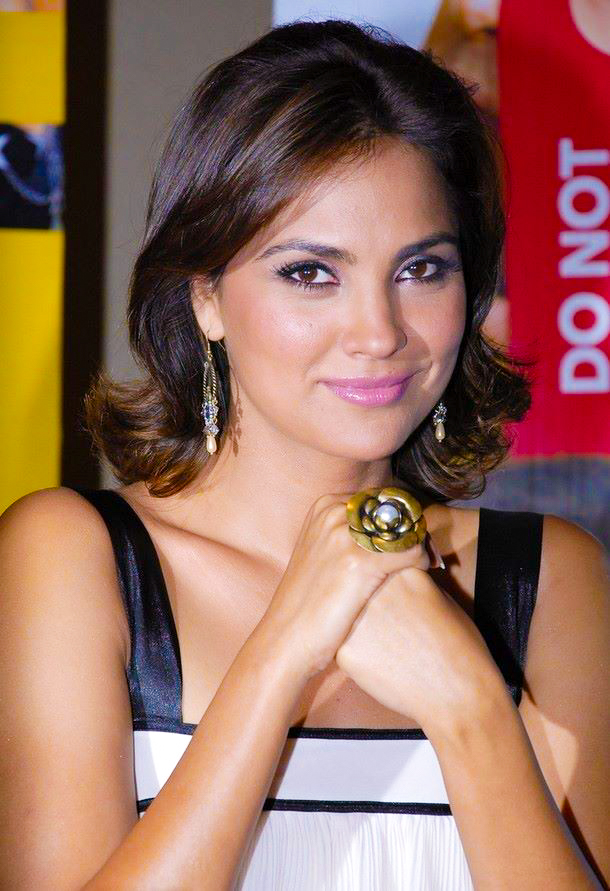
Lara Dutta

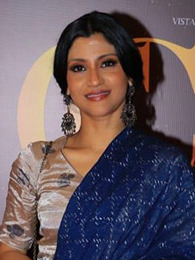
Konkona Sen Sharma

Year	Name	Debut film	Notable films
2000	Kareena Kapoor	Refugee	Kabhi Khushi Kabhie Gham (2001), Omkara (2006), Jab We Met (2007), 3 Idiots (2009), Talaash: The Answer Lies Within (2012), Good Newwz (2019)
2000	Ameesha Patel	Kaho Naa... Pyaar Hai	Gadar: Ek Prem Katha (2001), Humraaz (2002), Bhool Bhulaiyaa (2007), Thoda Pyaar Thoda Magic (2008)
2000	Shamita Shetty	Mohabbatein	Bewafaa (2005), Zeher (2005), Cash (2007)
2000	Kim Sharma	Mohabbatein	Tum Se Achcha Kaun Hai (2002), Fida (2004)
2000	Preeti Jhangiani	Mohabbatein	Awara Paagal Deewana (2002)
2000	Isha Koppikar	Fiza	Aamdani Atthani Kharcha Rupaiyaa(2001),Kya Kool Hai Hum (2005)
2001	Dia Mirza	Rehna Hai Tere Dil Mein	Lage Raho Munna Bhai (2006), Kurbaan (2009)
2001	Kiran	Yaadein	Jaani Dushman: Ek Anokhi Kahani(2002), Souten: The Other Woman(2006)
2001	Richa Pallod	Kuch Tum Kaho Kuch Hum Kahein	Agnipankh(2004)
2001	Gautami Gadgil Kapoor	Pyaar Tune Kya Kiya	Kuch Naa Kaho(2003), Fanaa(2006),Student of the Year(2012),Satyameva Jayate 2 (2021),De De Pyaar De 2(2025)
2001	Vasundhara Das	Monsoon Wedding	
2001	Reema Sen	Hum Ho Gaye Aapke	Jaal: The Trap (2003)
2001	Gracy Singh	Lagaan	Munna Bhai M.B.B.S. (2003)
2001	Bipasha Basu	Ajnabee	Raaz (2002), No Entry (2005), Corporate (2006), Omkara (2006), Dhoom 2 (2006), Bachna Ae Haseeno (2008)
2001	Sandali Sinha	Tum Bin	
2001	Keerthi Reddy	Pyaar Ishq Aur Mohabbat	
2001	Riya Sen	Style	
2001	Shilpi Sharma	Style	
2002	Esha Deol	Koi Mere Dil Se Pooche	Dhoom (2004), Dus (2005), Kaal (2005), No Entry (2005)
2002	Sameera Reddy	Maine Dil Tujhko Diya	Darna Mana Hai(2003), Plan(2004), Race(2008), De Dana Dan(2009), Tezz(2012), Naam(2024)
2002	Amrita Rao	Ab Ke Baras	Main Hoon Na (2004), Vivah (2006), Welcome to Sajjanpur (2008), Satyagraha (2013)
2002	Gauri Karnik	Sur	
2002	Jividha Sharma	Yeh Dil Aashiqanaa	
2002	Tulip Joshi	Mere Yaar Ki Shaadi Hai	Dil Maange More (2004)
2002	Amrita Arora	Kitne Door Kitne Paas	Kambakkht Ishq (2009)
2003	Chitrangada Singh	Hazaaron Khwaishein Aisi	Desi Boyz (2011), Inkaar (2013), Saheb, Biwi Aur Gangster 3 (2018), Gaslight (2023)
2003	Anita Hassanandani	Kucch To Hai	Krishna Cottage(2004)
2003	Genelia D'Souza	Tujhe Meri Kasam	Jaane Tu... Ya Jaane Na (2008)
2003	Shriya Saran	Tujhe Meri Kasam	Awarapan (2007), Gali Gali Chor Hai (2012), Drishyam (2015), Drishyam 2 (2022)
2003	Shenaz Treasury	Ishq Vishk	
2003	Anusha Dandekar	Mumbai Matinee	
2003	Nauheed Cyrusi	Inteha	
2003	Rimi Sen	Hungama	Dhoom (2004), Kyon Ki (2005), Golmaal: Fun Unlimited (2006)
2003	Lara Dutta	Andaaz	No Entry (2005), Bhagam Bhag (2006), Partner (2007), Housefull (2010)
2003	Priyanka Chopra	The Hero: Love Story of a Spy	Andaaz (2003), Aitraaz (2004), Fashion (2008), Barfi! (2012), Mary Kom (2014), Bajirao Mastani (2015), The Sky Is Pink (2019)
2003	Neha Dhupia	Qayamat: City Under Threat	
2003	Bhumika Chawla	Tere Naam	Run (2004), Dil Ne Jise Apna Kahaa (2004), M.S. Dhoni: The Untold Story (2016)
2003	Tanishaa	Sssshhh...	Neal 'n' Nikki (2005)
2003	Vidya Malvade	Inteha	
2003	Celina Jaitly	Janasheen	No Entry (2005)
2003	Mallika Sherawat	Khwahish	Pyaar Ke Side Effects (2006)
2003	Meher Vij	Saaya	Secret Superstar (2017)
2003	Katrina Kaif	Boom	Namastey London (2007), New York (2009), Zindagi Na Milegi Dobara (2011), Mere Brother Ki Dulhan (2011), Ek Tha Tiger (2012), Bang Bang! (2014), Tiger Zinda Hai (2017), Zero (2018), Bharat (2019)
2003	Udita Goswami	Paap	
2004	Soha Ali Khan	Dil Maange More!!!	Rang De Basanti (2006)
2004	Meera Jasmine	Yuva	
2004	Divya Khosla	Ab Tumhare Hawale Watan Sathiyo	Yaariyan(2014), Satyameva Jayate 2 (2021), Yaariyan 2 (2023), Savi (2024)
2004	Kajal Aggarwal	Kyun! Ho Gaya Na...	Final Cut of Director(2008), Singham(2011), Special 26(2013), Do Lafzon Ki Kahani(2016), Sikandar(2025)
2004	Gayatri Joshi	Swades	
2004	Ayesha Takia	Taarzan: The Wonder Car	Salaam-e-Ishq (2007), Wanted (2009)
2004	Manjari Fadnis	Rok Sako To Rok Lo	Jaane Tu... Ya Jaane Na (2008)
2004	Ahsaas Channa	Vaastu Shastra	Kabhi Alvida Naa Kehna (2006)
2005	Minissha Lamba	Yahaan	Bachna Ae Haseeno (2008), My Friend Ganesha (2007)
2005	Konkona Sen Sharma	Page 3	Mr. and Mrs. Iyer (2002), Omkara (2006), Life in a... Metro (2007), Laaga Chunari Mein Daag (2007), Wake Up Sid (2009), Lipstick Under My Burkha (2017)
2005	Radhika Apte	Vaah! Life Ho Toh Aisi!	Badlapur (2015), Lust Stories (2018), Andhadhun (2018), Raat Akeli Hai (2020)
2005	Isha Sharvani	Kisna: The Warrior Poet	U Me Aur Hum (2008), Luck by Chance (2009)
2005	Tamannaah	Chand Sa Roshan Chehra	Entertainment(2014),Babli Bouncer(2022),Lust Stories 2(2023),Stree 2(2024),Sikandar Ka Muqaddar(2024)
2005	Tanushree Dutta	Aashiq Banaya Aapne	Bhagam Bhag (2006), Dhol (2007)
2005	Vidya Balan	Parineeta	Lage Raho Munna Bhai (2006), Bhool Bhulaiyaa (2007), Ishqiya (2010), No One Killed Jessica (2011), The Dirty Picture (2011), Kahaani (2012), Tumhari Sulu (2017)
2005	Sonya Jehan	Taj Mahal: An Eternal Love Story	
2005	Amruta Subhash	White Rainbow	Raman Raghav 2.0 (2017), Gully Boy (2019), Dhamaka (2021)
2005	Meera	Nazar	
2006	Kangana Ranaut	Gangster	Fashion (2008), Tanu Weds Manu (2011), Krrish 3 (2013), Queen (2014), Tanu Weds Manu Returns (2015), Manikarnika: The Queen of Jhansi (2019), Panga (2020)
2006	Geeta Basra	Dil Diya Hai	
2007	Anaitha Nair	Chak De! India	
2007	Shilpa Shukla	Chak De! India	B.A. Pass (2012)
2007	Chitrashi Rawat	Chak De! India	
2007	Sagarika Ghatge	Chak De! India	
2007	Seema Azmi	Chak De! India	
2007	Sameksha	Mr. Hot Mr. Kool	
2007	Amruta Khanvilkar	Mumbai Salsa	Phoonk (2008), Raazi (2018), Malang (2020)
2007	Sonam Kapoor	Saawariya	Aisha (2010), Raanjhanaa (2013), Khoobsurat (2014), Neerja (2016),
2007	Deepika Padukone	Om Shanti Om	Love Aaj Kal (2009), Cocktail (2012), Yeh Jawaani Hai Deewani (2013), Piku (2015), Bajirao Mastani (2015), Padmaavat (2018)
2007	Hansika Motwani	Aap Kaa Surroor	
2007	Rasika Duggal	Anwar	Manto (2018), Lootcase (2020), Darbaan (2020)
2008	Mrunmayee Deshpande	Humne Jeena Seekh Liya	
2008	Rukmini Vijayakumar	Final Cut of Director	
2008	Anushka Sharma	Rab Ne Bana Di Jodi	Band Baaja Baaraat (2010), Jab Tak Hai Jaan (2012), PK (2014), NH10 (2015), Sultan (2016), Ae Dil Hai Mushkil (2016)
2008	Richa Chadha	Oye Lucky! Lucky Oye!	Fukrey (2013), Goliyon Ki Raasleela Ram-Leela (2013), Masaan (2015), Sarbjit (2016), Fukrey Returns (2017), Panga (2020)
2008	Prachi Desai	Rock On!!	Once Upon a Time in Mumbaai (2010), Bol Bachchan (2012)
2008	Adah Sharma	1920	Hasee Toh Phasee (2014), The Kerala Story (2023)
2008	Sai Tamhankar	Black & White	Hunterrr (2015), Mimi (2021), India Lockdown (2022)
2008	Mugdha Godse	Fashion	Jail (2009)
2008	Sonal Chauhan	Jannat	
2008	Asin	Ghajini	Ghajini (2008), Ready (2011)
2009	Jacqueline Fernandez	Aladin	Murder 2 (2011), Kick (2014), Dishoom (2016), Race 3 (2018)
2009	Sadha	Love Khichdi	
2009	Aditi Rao Hydari	Delhi-6	Yeh Saali Zindagi (2011), Rockstar (2011), Fitoor (2016), Padmaavat (2018)
2009	Shruti Haasan	Luck	D-Day (2013), Gabbar is Back (2015), Welcome Back (2015), Rocky Handsome (2016)
2009	Swara Bhasker	Madholal Keep Walking	Tanu Weds Manu (2011), Raanjhanaa (2013), Tanu Weds Manu Returns (2015), Nil Battey Sannata (2016), Anaarkali of Aarah (2017), Veere Di Wedding (2018)

== 2010s ==
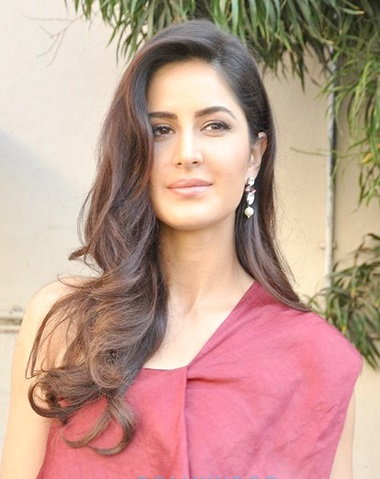
Katrina Kaif

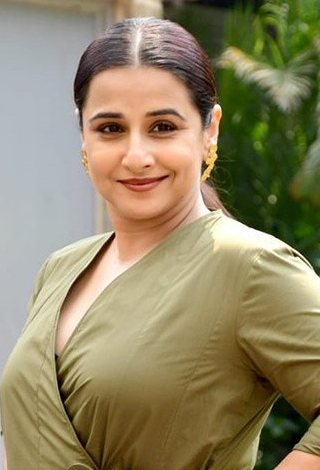
Vidya Balan

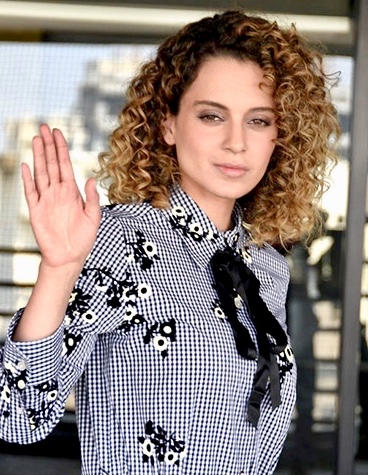
Kangana Ranaut

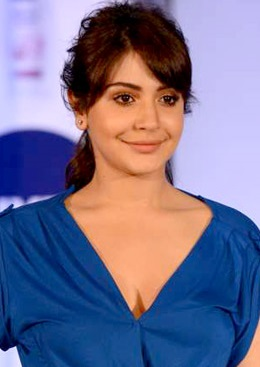
Anushka Sharma

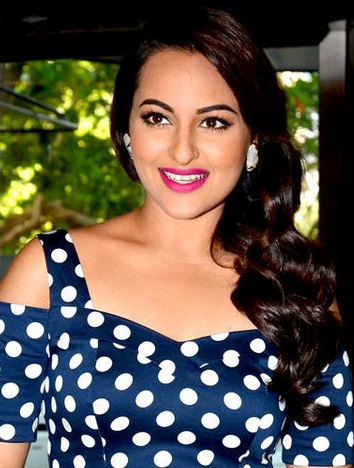
Sonakshi Sinha

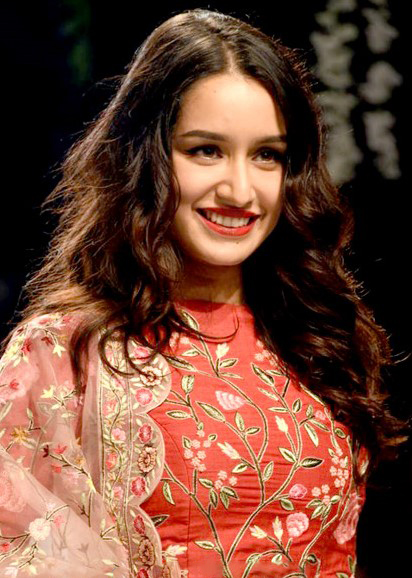
Shraddha Kapoor

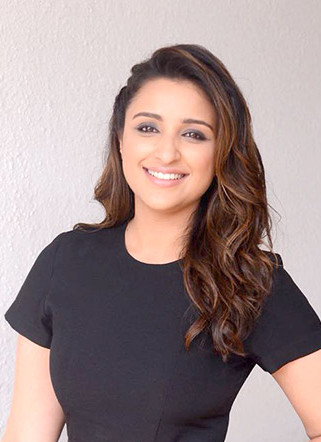
Parineeti Chopra

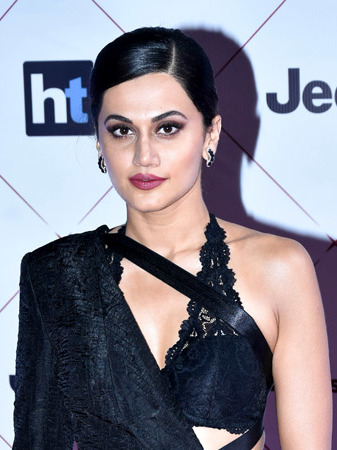
Taapsee Pannu

Year	Name	Debut film	Notable films
2010	Aruna Shields	Prince	
2010	Padmapriya	Striker	Chef (2017)
2010	Trisha	Khatta Meetha	
2010	Pooja Kumar	Anjaana Anjaani	Vishwaroop(2013), Vishwaroop II (2018)
2010	Priyamani	Raavan	Jawan (2023), Maidaan (2024)
2010	Sonakshi Sinha	Dabangg	Rowdy Rathore (2012), Lootera (2013), Mission Mangal (2019)
2010	Shraddha Kapoor	Teen Patti	Aashiqui 2 (2013), Ek Villain (2014), ABCD 2 (2015), Stree (2018), Chhichhore (2019), Tu Jhoothi Main Makkaar (2023), Stree 2 (2024)
2010	Neha Sharma	Crook	Youngistaan (2014), Tum Bin II (2016), Tanhaji (2020)
2010	Zareen Khan	Veer	Hate Story 3 (2015)
2010	Lisa Haydon	Aisha	Ae Dil Hai Mushkil (2016), Housefull 3 (2016)
2010	Kirti Kulhari	Khichdi: The Movie	Pink (2016), Indu Sarkar (2017), Blackmail (2018), Uri: The Surgical Strike (2019), Mission Mangal (2019), The Girl on the Train (2021)
2010	Sandeepa Dhar	Isi Life Mein	
2010	Sara Loren	Kajraare	
2010	Shraddha Das	Lahore	
2010	Pallavi Sharda	My Name Is Khan	Dus Tola(2010), Heroine(2012), Besharam(2013), Hawaizaada(2015)
2011	Sonnalli Seygall	Pyaar Ka Punchnama	Pyaar Ka Punchnama 2 (2015), Jai Mummy Di (2020)
2011	Nushrratt Bharuccha	Pyaar Ka Punchnama	Pyaar Ka Punchnama 2 (2015), Sonu Ke Titu Ki Sweety (2018), Dream Girl (2019), Ajeeb Daastaans (2021), Chhorii (2021)
2011	Puja Gupta	F.A.L.T.U	Go Goa Gone (2013), Shortcut Romeo (2013)
2011	Parineeti Chopra	Ladies vs Ricky Bahl	Ishaqzaade (2012), Shuddh Desi Romance (2013), Hasee Toh Phasee (2014), Kesari (2019), Sandeep Aur Pinky Faraar (2021), Saina (2021)
2011	Nargis Fakhri	Rockstar	Rockstar (2011), Main Tera Hero (2014)
2011	Purbi Joshi	Damadamm!	
2012	Huma Qureshi	Gangs of Wasseypur – Part 1	Ek Thi Daayan (2013), Badlapur (2015), Monica, O My Darling (2022)
2012	Yami Gautam	Vicky Donor	Badlapur (2015), Kaabil (2017), Uri: The Surgical Strike (2019), Bala (2019), A Thursday (2022), Chor Nikal Ke Bhaga (2023)
2012	Ileana D'Cruz	Barfi!	Barfi! (2012), Main Tera Hero (2014), Rustom (2016)
2012	Alia Bhatt	Student of the Year	Highway (2014), Dear Zindagi (2016), Udta Punjab (2016), Raazi (2018), Gangubai Kathiawadi (2022), Darlings (2022), Brahmāstra: Part One – Shiva (2022), Rocky Aur Rani Kii Prem Kahaani (2023)
2012	Esha Gupta	Jannat 2	Raaz 3D (2012), Rustom (2016), Total Dhamaal (2019)
2012	Priya Anand	English Vinglish	Fukrey (2013), Andhadhun (2018)
2012	Veena Malik	Gali Gali Mein Chor Hai	
2012	Evelyn Sharma	From Sydney with Love	Yeh Jawaani Hai Deewani (2013)
2012	Diana Penty	Cocktail	Happy Bhag Jayegi (2016), Happy Phirr Bhag Jayegi (2018), Shiddat (2020)
2012	Amy Jackson	Ekk Deewana Tha	Singh Is Bliing (2015), Freaky Ali (2016), Crakk (2024)
2012	Sunny Leone	Jism 2	
2012	Sayani Gupta	Second Marriage Dot Com	Margarita with a Straw (2014), Article 15 (2019)
2013	Elli Avram	Mickey Virus	
2013	Andrea Jeremiah	Vishwaroop	Vishwaroop II (2018)
2013	Vaani Kapoor	Shuddh Desi Romance	Befikre (2016), War (2019), Chandigarh Kare Aashiqui (2021)
2013	Amyra Dastur	Issaq	
2013	Armeena Khan	Huff! It's Too Much	
2013	Urvashi Rautela	Singh Saab the Great	
2013	Sonalee Kulkarni	Grand Masti	Singham Returns (2014)
2013	Taapsee Pannu	Chashme Baddoor	Baby (2015), Pink (2016), Manmarziyaan (2018), Badla (2019), Thappad (2020), Haseen Dillruba (2021), Looop Lapeta (2022), Dunki (2023)
2013	Raashii Khanna	Madras Cafe	Yodha (2024)
2013	Rhea Chakraborty	Mere Dad Ki Maruti	
2013	Wamiqa Gabbi	Sixteen	Baby John (2024), Khufiya (2023)
2014	Hasleen Kaur	Karle Pyaar Karle	
2014	Nora Fatehi	Roar: Tigers of the Sundarbans	Street Dancer 3D (2020)
2014	Rakul Preet Singh	Yaariyan	De De Pyaar De (2019), Runway 34 (2022)
2014	Erica Fernandes	Babloo Happy Hai	
2014	Sonali Raut	The Xpose	
2014	Humaima Malick	Raja Natwarlal	
2014	Patralekha	CityLights	
2014	Tara Alisha Berry	Mastram	
2014	Kriti Sanon	Heropanti	Dilwale (2015), Raabta (2017), Bareilly Ki Barfi (2017), Luka Chuppi (2019), Mimi (2021), Teri Baaton Mein Aisa Uljha Jiya (2024), Crew (2024), Do Patti (2024)
2014	Deeksha Seth	Lekar Hum Deewana Dil	
2014	Nikita Dutta	Lekar Hum Deewana Dil	Kabir Singh(2019), The Big Bull (2021)
2014	Sonia Mann	Kahin Hai Mera Pyar	
2014	Kiara Advani	Fugly	M. S. Dhoni: The Untold Story (2016), Kabir Singh (2019), Shershaah (2021), Satyaprem Ki Katha (2023)
2014	Daisy Shah	Jai Ho	Hate Story 3 (2015)
2014	Anupriya Goenka	Bobby Jasoos	Tiger Zinda Hai (2017), Padmaavat (2018), War (2019)
2015	Bhumi Pednekar	Dum Laga Ke Haisha	Toilet: Ek Prem Katha (2017), Shubh Mangal Saavdhan (2017), Sonchiriya (2019), Saand Ki Aankh (2019), Bala (2019), Pati Patni Aur Woh (2019), Badhaai Do (2022), Bhakshak (2024)
2015	Ishita Dutta	Drishyam	Firangi(2017), Blank(2019), Setters(2019), Drishyam 2(2022)
2015	Akshara Haasan	Shamitabh	
2015	Abhinaya	Shamitabh	
2015	Madhurima Tuli	Baby	
2015	Athiya Shetty	Hero	
2015	Anushka Ranjan	Wedding Pullav	
2015	Akanksha Puri	Calendar Girls	
2015	Avani Modi	Calendar Girls	
2015	Kyra Dutt	Calendar Girls	
2015	Ruhi Singh	Calendar Girls	
2015	Satarupa Pyne	Calendar Girls	
2015	Mithila Palkar	Karwaan	Chopsticks (2019), Tribhanga (2021)
2016	Mawra Hocane	Sanam Teri Kasam	
2016	Ulka Gupta	Traffic	Mr. Kabaadi(2017), Simmba (2018), The Kerala Story 2: Goes Beyond (2026)
2016	Ritika Singh	Saala Khadoos	InCar(2023)
2016	Sanchana Natarajan	Saala Khadoos	
2016	Sayyeshaa	Shivaay	
2016	Erika Kaar	Shivaay	
2016	Shriya Pilgaonkar	Fan	
2016	Sobhita Dhulipala	Raman Raghav 2.0	
2016	Pooja Hegde	Mohenjo Daro	Housefull 4(2019), Cirkus(2022), Kisi Ka Bhai Kisi Ki Jaan(2023), Deva(2025), Hai Jawani Toh Ishq Hona Hai(2026)
2016	Saiyami Kher	Mirzya	
2016	Kriti Kharbanda	Raaz Reboot	Shaadi Mein Zaroor Aana (2017)
2016	Sreelekha Mitra	Ardhangini Ek Ardhsatya	
2016	Disha Patani	M.S. Dhoni: The Untold Story	Baaghi 2 (2018), Malang (2020),Ek Villain Returns (2022)
2016	Sonarika Bhadoria	Saansein	
2016	Sanya Malhotra	Dangal	Badhaai Ho (2018), Photograph (2019), Ludo (2020), Pagglait (2021), Meenakshi Sundareshwar (2021), Jawan (2023), Mrs. (2025)
2016	Fatima Sana Shaikh	Dangal	Thugs of Hindostan (2018), Ludo (2020), Ajeeb Daastaans (2021)
2016	Zaira Wasim	Dangal	Secret Superstar (2017), The Sky Is Pink (2019)
2016	Suhani Bhatnagar	Dangal	
2017	Mahira Khan	Raees	
2017	Mehreen Pirzada	Phillauri	
2017	Aakanksha Singh	Badrinath Ki Dulhania	Runway 34 (2022)
2017	Parvathy	Qarib Qarib Singlle	
2017	Saba Qamar	Hindi Medium	
2017	Anya Singh	Qaidi Band	
2017	Payal Ghosh	Patel Ki Punjabi Shaadi	
2017	Sajal Aly	Mom	
2017	Tripti Dimri	Poster Boys	Laila Majnu(2018) Bulbbul (2020), Qala (2022) Animal (2023), Bad Newz(2024), Dhadak 2(2025)
2017	Zhu Zhu	Tubelight	
2017	Isha Talwar	Tubelight	
2017	Nidhhi Agerwal	Munna Michael	
2017	Aishwarya Rajesh	Daddy	
2018	Malavika Mohanan	Beyond the Clouds	Yudhra (2024)
2018	Gayathiri Iyer	Raid	Ghost (2019)
2018	Angira Dhar	Love per Square Foot	Commando 3 (2019), Runway 34 (2022)
2018	Kritika Kamra	Mitron	
2018	Mouni Roy	Gold	Brahmāstra: Part One – Shiva (2022)
2018	Aisha Sharma	Satyameva Jayate	
2018	Radhika Madan	Pataakha	Angrezi Medium (2020), Shiddat (2021)
2018	Janhvi Kapoor	Dhadak	Gunjan Saxena (2020), Mili (2022), Bawaal (2023)
2018	Warina Hussain	Loveyatri	Yaariyan 2 (2023)
2018	Banita Sandhu	October	Sardar Udham (2021)
2018	Ihana Dhillon	Hate Story 4	
2018	Mrunal Thakur	Love Sonia	Super 30 (2019), Ghost Stories (2020), Jersey (2022), Lust Stories 2 (2023)
2018	Ishita Chauhan	Genius	
2018	Sara Ali Khan	Kedarnath	Simmba (2018), Atrangi Re (2021), Zara Hatke Zara Bachke (2023)
2018	Vaidehi Parshurami	Simmba	
2019	Melissa Raju Thomas	Moothon	Taish (2020)
2019	Shraddha Srinath	Milan Talkies	
2019	Shreya Dhanwanthary	Why Cheat India	
2019	Pooja Sawant	Junglee	
2019	Tara Sutaria	Student of the Year 2	Marjaavaan (2019), Tadap (2021)
2019	Ananya Panday	Student of the Year 2	Pati Patni Aur Woh (2019), Gehraiyaan (2022)
2019	Meenakshi Chaudhary	Upstarts	
2019	Rukmini Vasanth	Upstarts	
2019	Pranutan Bahl	Notebook	Helmet(2021)
2019	Nithya Menen	Mission Mangal	
2019	Megha Akash	Satellite Shankar	Radhe (2021)
2019	Saiee Manjrekar	Dabangg 3	Major (2022)
2019	Sharmin Segal	Malaal	Atithi Bhooto Bhava (2022)
2019	Shivaleeka Oberoi	Yeh Saali Aashiqui	Khuda Hafiz (2020)
2019	Sahher Bambba	Pal Pal Dil Ke Paas	
2019	Soniya Bansal	Naughty Gang	
2019	Sumbul Touqeer	Article 15	

== 2020s ==
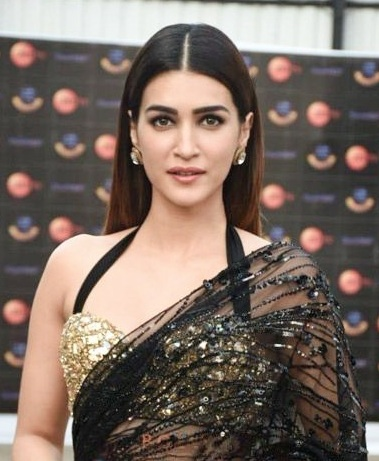
Kriti Sanon

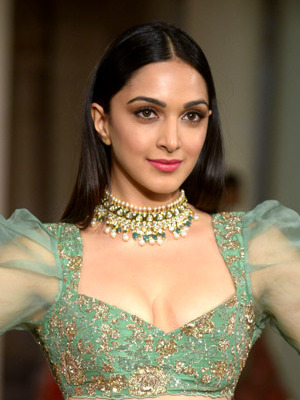
Kiara Advani

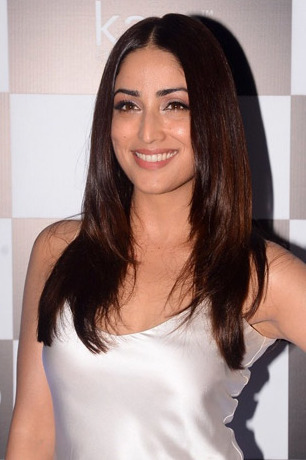
Yami Gautam

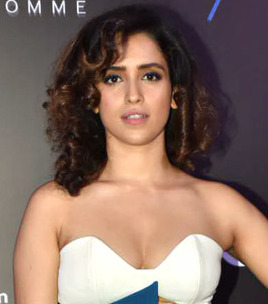
Sanya Malhotra

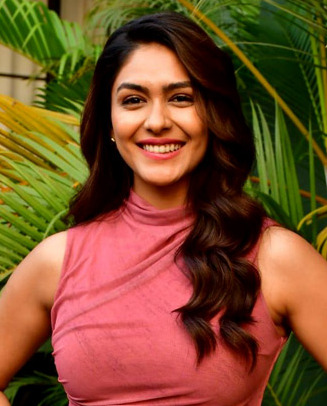
Mrunal Thakur

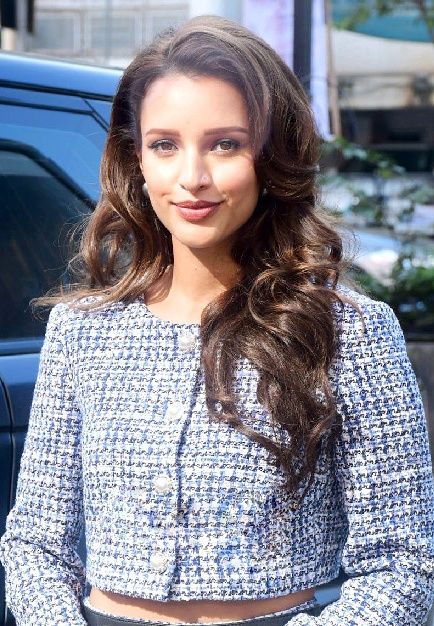
Tripti Dimri

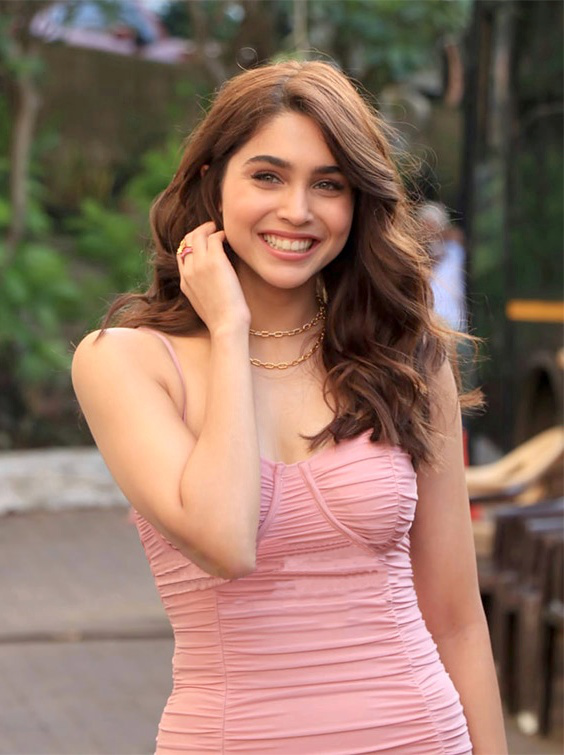
Sharvari

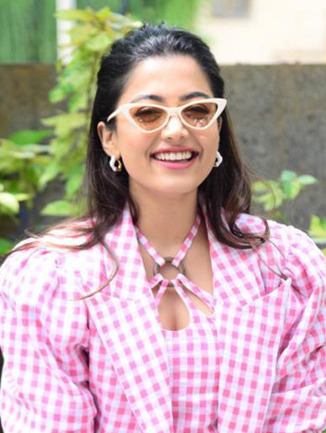
Rashmika Mandanna

Year	Name	Debut film	Notable films
2020	Arjumman Mughal	O Pushpa I Hate Tears	
2020	Rukshar Dhillon	Bhangra Paa Le	
2020	Shirley Setia	Maska	
2020	Shalini Pandey	Bamfaad	Jayeshbhai Jordaar(2022) Maharaj(2024)
2020	Kusha Kapila	Ghost Stories	
2020	Hina Khan	Hacked	
2020	Alaya F	Jawaani Jaaneman	Freddy(2022), U-Turn(2023), Srikanth(2024)
2020	Yogita Bihani	AK vs AK	
2020	Arushi Sharma	Love Aaj Kal	Jaadugar (2022)
2020	Sadia Khateeb	Shikara	Raksha Bandhan(2022), The Diplomat(2025)
2020	Sanjana Sanghi	Dil Bechara	
2020	Asha Negi	Ludo	
2020	Pearle Maaney	Ludo	
2020	Rinku Rajguru	Unpaused	
2021	Jhataleka	Tuesdays and Fridays	
2021	Shruti Sharma	Pagglait	
2021	Ashlesha Thakur	Pagglait	Jawan (2023)
2021	Anjali Anand	Bell Bottom	Rocky Aur Rani Kii Prem Kahaani(2023)
2021	Medha Shankr	Shaadisthan	12th Fail (2023)
2021	Pranitha Subhash	Hungama 2	Bhuj: The Pride of India (2021)
2021	Surbhi Jyoti	Kya Meri Sonam Gupta Bewafa Hai?	
2021	Rukmini Maitra	Sanak	
2021	Tejashri Pradhan	Babloo Bachelor	
2021	Sharvari	Bunty Aur Babli 2	Munjya (2024)
2021	Mahima Makwana	Antim: The Final Truth	
2021	Dimple Hayathi	Atrangi Re	
2022	Chum Darang	Badhaai Do	
2022	Andrea Kevichüsa	Anek	
2022	Manushi Chhillar	Samrat Prithviraj	
2022	Prajakta Koli	Jugjugg Jeeyo	
2022	Rubina Dilaik	Ardh	
2022	Khushalii Kumar	Dhokha: Round D Corner	
2022	Sargun Mehta	Cuttputlli	
2022	Rashmika Mandanna	Goodbye	Animal (2023), Chhaava (2025), Sikandar(2025)
2022	Jeniffer Piccinato	Ram Setu	
2022	Urmilla Kanetkar	Thank God	
2022	Sonia Rathee	Tara vs Bilal	Night Encounters (2023), Kapkapiii (2025)
2023	Riddhi Dogra	Lakadbaggha	
2023	Mimi Chakraborty	Shastry Viruddh Shastry	
2023	Anushka Sen	Am I Next	
2023	Siddhi Idnani	The Kerala Story	Kapkapiii(2025)
2023	Tanya Maniktala	Mumbaikar	
2023	Shehnaaz Gill	Kisi Ka Bhai Kisi Ki Jaan	
2023	Avneet Kaur	Tiku Weds Sheru	
2023	Nayanthara	Jawan	
2023	Sanjeeta Bhattacharya	Jawan	
2023	Aaliyah Qureishi	Jawan	
2023	Anaswara Rajan	Yaariyan 2	
2023	Bhagyashri Borse	Yaariyan 2	Chandu Champion (2024)
2023	Priya Prakash Varrier	Yaariyan 2	Param Sundari (2025)
2023	Alizeh Agnihotri	Farrey	
2023	Khushi Kapoor	The Archies	Loveyapa (2025), Nadaaniyan (2025)
2024	Pratibha Ranta	Laapataa Ladies	
2024	Nitanshi Goel	Laapataa Ladies	
2024	Ketika Sharma	Vijay 69	
2024	Nimisha Sajayan	Lantrani	
2024	Ananya Agarwal	Maharaj	
2024	Janki Bodiwala	Shaitaan	
2024	Sushrii Shreya Mishraa	Ruslaan	
2024	Kashika Kapoor	Aayushmati Geeta Matric Pass	
2024	Dhvani Bhanushali	Kahan Shuru Kahan Khatam	
2024	Keerthy Suresh	Baby John	
2025	Tridha Choudhury	Dil Dosti Aur Dogs	
2025	Harleen Sethi	Be Happy	
2025	Sonam Bajwa	Housefull 5	
2025	Shanaya Kapoor	Aankhon Ki Gustaakhiyan	
2025	Aneet Padda	Saiyaara	
2025	Tanvi Ram	Param Sundari	
2025	Harnaaz Sandhu	Baaghi 4	
2025	Sara Arjun	Dhurandhar	
2026	Sai Pallavi	Ek Din	

== See also ==
- Hindi cinema
- List of Indian film actresses
- List of Marathi film actresses
- List of Kannada film actresses
- List of Tamil film actresses
- List of Telugu film actresses
