= Indira Devi (disambiguation) =

Indira Devi of Cooch Behar (1892–1968), was the Princess of Baroda State, India, and regent of Cooch Behar.

Indira Devi may also refer to:

- Indira Devi (actress), silent film actress
- Indira Devi (politician), Indian politician
- Indira Devi of Kapurthala (1912–1979), Indian princess and socialite
- Indira Devi Chaudhurani (1873–1960), Indian musician and composer
