= Durgesh Nandini (1927 film) =

1927 film

Durgesh Nandini is a Bengali silent drama film directed by Priyanath N. Ganguly based on the 1865 Bengali novel Durgeshnandini by Bankim Chandra Chattopadhyay. The film was released on 3 December 1927 under the banner of Madan Theatres. It is the first cinematic adaptation of the novel.

== Plot ==
The film set on the backdrop of conflict between the Mughal forces and the Rajputs. The story follows the love and separation of Jagat Singh and Tilottama. Their relationship is complicated by political rivalry, warfare and the actions of Osman.

== Cast ==
- Durgadas Bannerjee
- Kanu Banerjee
- Ahindra Choudhury
- Indira Devi
- Seeta Devi
- Patience Cooper
- Kanaknarayan Bhup
- Ashu Bose
- Prabodh Chandra Bose
- Naresh Mitra
- Joy Narayan Mukherjee
