= Indira Devi (actress) =

Indian actress

Indira Devi, born Effie Hippolet, was an actress of early silent Indian cinema.

== Career ==
Indira Devi was born from Calcutta's Anglo-Indian community. She was a leading actress in early silent films for the Indian cinema. She paused her career in the early 1930s after her marriage. She played the lead role opposite Prithviraj Kapoor in Sher-e-Arab / Arabian Knights (1930). She returned to films in 1935.

== Selected filmography ==
- Milaap (1937)
- Wamaq Azra/Sacchi Mohabbat (1935)
- Sher-e-Arab / Arabian Knights (1930)
- Vaman Avatar (1930)
- Ganesh Janam (1930)
- Rajsinha (1930)
- Kapal Kundala (1929)
- Jana (1927)
- Durgesh Nandini (1927 film)
- Punarjanma (1927)
- Jaydev (1926)
