= List of Hindi films of 1928 =

A list of films produced by the Bollywood film industry based in Mumbai in 1928:

== 1928 ==
Notable films of Indian cinema in 1928:

- Devdas, a silent film produced by Eastern Films Syndicate, Calcutta, and directed by Naresh Mitra was the first celluloid version of Sharat Chandra Chattopadhyay's famous story. It starred Phani Burma as Devdas. It was later to be remade eight more times in Indian Cinema with the most popular version still cited as P. C. Barua's Devdas in 1935 starring K. L. Saigal.
- Khoon-e-Nahak was the first Indian screen adaptation of Hamlet. A silent film, it was directed by Athavale based on Mehdi Hasan Ahsan's version of the Hamlet play, written originally for the Parsi theatre.
- Imperial Film Company's Madhuri and Anarkali, both directed by R. S. Choudhary and starring Sulochana (Ruby Myers), were commercial successes. Both films were made into talkie versions later, with Madhuri in 1932 and Anarkali in 1935.
- The Loves Of A Mughal Prince, directed by Charu Roy and Prafulla Roy for Great Eastern Corporation, was the first screen adaptation of Imtiaz Ali Taj's acclaimed play Anarkali (1922).
- Shiraz directed by Franz Osten and produced by Himanshu Rai, was an adaption of the play, Shiraz: A Romance of India written by Niranjan Pal. Starring Rai in the lead role as Shiraz, it has been referred to as "one of the boldest films".
- Vigathakumaran also called The Lost Child was the first feature length Malayalam film, directed by J. C. Daniel. It was produced by Daniel for his production company Travancore National Pictures.

== A-C ==
Title	Director	Cast	Genre	Notes Cinematographer
A Friend In Need a.k.a. Geeta Rahasya	K. P. Bhave	Ermeline, E. Billimoria, J. P. Gidwani		Imperial Film Company; DOP: A. P. Karandikar
Amrit Ki Zaher a.k.a. Wine And Woman	Anand Prasad Kapoor	Zebunisa, Mani, Balahai, Padval		Sharda Film Company. DOP: Naval Bhat
Anarkali a.k.a. The Loves of a Moghul Prince	Charu Roy, Prafulla Roy	Seeta Devi, Diwan Sharar, Maya Devi, Shakuntala Tembe, Sawan Singh, Rajkumari, Imtiz Ali Taj	Legend Romance	Great Eastern Film Corp., Delhi; DOP: Vishnu B. Joshi
Ankh Ka Nasha		Patience Cooper, Master Mohan, Sharifa, Mohammed Ishaq, Manilal, Sooraj Ram	Social	Madan Theatres Ltd. Story by Agha Hashar Kashmiri
Balaji Nimbalkar	Dadasaheb Phalke		Historical	Hindustan Cinema Film Company, Nasik
Bhai Ke Kasai a.k.a. His Father's Honour	Ramakant, Gharekhan	Shanta Kumari, R. N. Vaidya, Jani Babu	Social	Shree Jagdish Film Co. DOP: G. G. Gogate
Bishabriksha a.k.a. The Poison Tree	Jyotish Bannerjee	Durgadas Bannerjee, Leelavati, Ahindra Chowdhury, Jaynarayan Mukherjee, Manoranjan Bhattacharya, Tarakbala, Kartik Dey	Social	Madan Theatres Ltd. DOP: Jatin Das
Bhakta Damaji a.k.a. Devout Damaji	Dadasaheb Phalke	Bhauro Datar, Gotiram	Devotional	Hindustan Cinema Film Company, Nasik
Bhasmasur	Tarapada Saha	Deben Mullick	Mythology	Prativa Cinema Co., Calcutta; DOP: Tarapada Saha
Bhranti a.k.a. Mistake	Jyotish Bannerjee	Patience Cooper, Durgadas Bannerjee, Seeta Devi, Satyen, Naresh Mitra, Sailen Chowdhury, Manorama, Tarasundari, Chittaranjan Goswami, Sashimukhi, Danibabu	Social	Madan Theatres Ltd.
Brother To Brother a.k.a. Tarunina Tarang	Prafulla Ghosh	Gulab, Durga, Haridas, Takle, Keshavlal	Social	Krishna Film Company; DOP: Gordhanbhai Patel
Celestial Lotus a.k.a. Pandav Patrani	Nagendra Majumdar, M. Bhavani	D. Billimoria, Sulochana (Ruby Myers), Jilloobai, Wagle, Putli	Fantasy	Imperial Film Company; DOP: Adi Irani
Chamakti Chanda	M. Udwadia	Zubeida, Jagtap Jr., Yvonne Wallace,	Costume	Jagtap Film Co. DOP: V. B. Jagtap
Chandrahasa	Kanjibhai Rathod	Haider Shah, Durga Korgaonkar, P. R. Joshi, Kusum, Sakina, Keshavlal, Athavle, Sultan, Alam, Gangaram, Nizam	Devotional	Krishna Film Company; DOP: Chaturbhai Patel
Chandravali a.k.a. The Crown of Virtue	Fatma Begum	Fatma Begum, Shahzadi, Jani Babu, Yakub, Sultana	Costume	Victoria Fatma Film Co. DOP: V. V. Date
Chatur Kanta a.k.a. Chatur Kanya	R. R. Gharekhan, Ramakant	Kumudini, Athavle, Roy	Social	Excelsior Film Co. DOP: Ambadas Pawar

== D-F ==
Title	Director	Cast	Genre	Notes Cinematographer
Daughters Of Today a.k.a. Prem Pariksha	G. K. Mehta	Miss Maya, Hiralal, Thomas, Miss Belle Love, Vijay Kumar, E. Ismail	Social	Lahore-Premier Film Co. DOP: G. K. Mehta
Destiny Defied a.k.a. Lekh Par Mekh	Homi Master	Panna, Heera, Noor Mohammed Charlie, Thomas, Gani Babu	Social	Kohinoor Film Company; DOP: K. G. Gokhale
Detective Kumar	K. B. Athavale	Rampyari, Athavale, Malini, Salvi	Social	Excelsior Film Company; DOP: D. D. Dabke
Dev Kanya a.k.a. Daughter of God	Kanjibhai Rathod	Gulab, Nandram, Lila, P. R. Joshi, Vishnu	Devotional	Krishna Film Company; DOP: Chaturbhai Patel
Devdas	Naresh Mitra	Tinkari Chakraborty, Naresh Mitra, Niharbala, Moni Ghosh, Phani Burma, Miss Light, Rama Devi, Kanaknarayan Bhup	Social	Eastern Film Syndicate, Calcutta; DOP: Nitin Bose
Draupadi Vastra Haran a.k.a. The Royal Gambler	Parshwanath Yeshwant Altekar	Durgabai Koregaonkar, Gangoobai	Mythology	United Pictures Syndicate
Dreamland a.k.a. Swarga Vihar	Maneklal Patel	Gulab, Rampyari, Gangaram, Vishnu	Fantasy	Krishna Film Company; DOP: Chaturbhai Patel
Emperor Ashok a.k.a. Samrat Ashok	Bhagwati Mishra	Zubeida, Madanrai Vakil, Udwadia, Putli, Jilloobai, Asooji, Dwarki	Historical	Royal Art Studio, Lokmanya Film Co.
Enticement a.k.a. Mayana Rang	Haribhai Desai, Sundarrao Nadkarni	Zebunisa, Gangoobai, Jairam Desai, Master Bachu, Baburo Gade	Costume	Suvarna Pictures; DOP: Pawar
Ex-Husband a.k.a. Soneri Jaal	Gordhandas Patel	Gulab, Nandram	Costume	Gujrat Studios
Fall Of Pavagadh a.k.a. Pavagadh Nu Patan a.k.a. Goddess Mahakali	Nagendra Majumdar	Navinchandra, Iris Crawford, K. B. Athavale, Zaverbhai Kaiser	Historical	Producer: I. K. Yagnik
Fatal Garland a.k.a. Haiyan No Haar	Bhagwati Mishra	Ermeline, Jamshedji Khansaheb, Madanrai Vakil, Putli, Mazhar Khan	Social	Imperial Film Company
Fatal Kiss a.k.a. Ekaj Chumban	K. B. Athavale	Yakbal, Athavale	Social	Excelsior Film Company; DOP: D. D. Dabke
Father O'mine a.k.a. Pita Ke Parmeshwar	Rama Chowdhury	Elizer, Jamshedji Khansaheb, Putli, Jilloobai, Yusuf	Social	Imperial Film Companybr>DOP: Rustom Irani
Foolish Husbands a.k.a. Bharmayalo Bharthar	Narayan Deware	Behram Vasania, Fatma Begum, Faram, Jumna	Social	Kohinoor Film Company. DOP: Narayan Deware
Forsaken Love a.k.a. Prem Nirasha	Pesi Karani	Heera, Jumna, Behram Vasania, R. N. Vaidya	Social	Kohinoor Film Company; DOP:

== G-I ==
Title	Director	Cast	Genre	Notes Cinematographer
Ganimi Kawa a.k.a. Guerrilla Tactics	N. D. Sarpotdar	Lalita Pawar, Amboo, Durgabai Koregaonkar, Suryakant, Khanderao Kondke	Historical	Aryan Film Co. DOP: Bhal G. Pendharkar
Ghor Pratignya a.k.a. Sarojani	Homi Master	Heera, Panna, Jani Babu, Thomas, Usha	Costume	Kohinoor Film Company; DOP: K. G. Gokhale
Ghoshayatra	G. V. Sane	Bhaurao Datar		Hindustan Cinema Film Co., Nasik; DOP: Shinde
Golden Gang a.k.a. Soneri Toli	K. P. Bhave	Zubeida, Udwadia, Jagtap	Social	Jagtap Film Co.
Grihalaxmi a.k.a. The Daughter-In-Law	Chandulal Shah	Gohar, Raja Sandow, Vaidya	Social	Shree Jagdish Film Co. DOP: G. G. Gogate, Pandurang S. Naik
Gul Badan	Harshadrai Mehta	Zebunissa, Master Vithal	Costume	Sharda Movietone; DOP: Naval Bhat
Gul Sanobar	Homi Master	Hira, Yakbal, Khalil, Gani Babu	Fantasy	Kohinoor Film Company; DOP: K. G. Gokhale
Gulru Zarina a.k.a. Flower-Like Zarina	A. P. Kapoor	Janibabu, Lobo	Fantasy	Sharda Film Company; DOP: Naval Bhat
Harishchandra a.k.a. Raja Harishchandra	N. D. Sarpotdar	Bhaurao Datar, Lalita Pawar, Durgabai Koregaokar, H. Dhodke, Shantaram Sagun, Dattoba Rajwade, P. N. Varne, Jhadhavrao	Mythology	Aryan Film Co. DOP: Y. D. Sarpotdar
Heer Ranjah	Fatma Begum	Zubeida, Jani Babu, Shahzadi, Fatma Begum	Legend Romance	Victoria Fatma Film Co.
Hira Sundari	A. P. Kapoor	Master Vithal, Jani Babu, Nirasha	Social	Sharda Film Company; DOP: Naval Bhat
Hoor-E-Arab a.k.a. Aladdin And The Magic Lamp	Ratansha Sinore	Patience Cooper, Bapuji Punegar, Farida	Fantasy	Imperial Film Company; DOP: Adi Irani
Hoor-E-Baghdad a.k.a. Fairy Of Baghdad a.k.a. Forbidden Love	Bhagwati Mishra	Ermeline, Mazhar Khan, W. M. Khan	Fantasy	Saraswati Film Company, Imperial Film Company; DOP: Rustom Irani
Ideal Wife a.k.a. Arya Mahila	N. D. Sarpotdar	Lalita Pawar, Baburao Athavale, Durgabai Koregaonkar, S. Bhopatkar, P. N. Varne, Jadhavrao	Social	Aryan Film Co. DOP: Y. D. Sarpotdar
Indulal Advocate a.k.a. Bodku Mathu	Kanjibhai Rathod	Jehangir	Social	Gujarat Studio

== J-L ==
Title	Director	Cast	Genre	Notes Cinematographer
Jagadguru Shrimad Shankaracharya a.k.a. World Teacher Shankaracharya	P. Y. Altekar	Keshav Narayan Kale, Ermeline, Jilloobai, P. Y. Altekar, Baburao Sansare, Putli, Gohar, Nazir, Rustom, Sakhu	Devotional	Imperial Film Company; DOP: A. P. Karandikar
Jai Bhavani	K. P. Bhave	Bhonsle, Jagtap, Dabir, Dwarkee	Historical	Jagtap Pictures; DOP: M. R. Jagtap
Kamla Kumari a.k.a. Sabur Shah	Bhagwati Mishra	Madanrai Vakil, Ermeline, Gohar, Yakub	Legend	Imperial Film Company; DOP: Rustom Irani
Kamsena Lilavati		Yakbal, K. B. Athavale, Mary		Excelsior Film Co.
Khoon-E-Nahak a.k.a. Hamlet	K. B. Athavale	Rampyari, K. C. Roy, Salvi, Yakbal	Tragedy Drama	Excelsior Film Co. DOP: Ambadas Pawar
Kanak Kanta a.k.a. Navlakha Haar	A. P. Kapoor	Master Vithal, Meherbanu, Prabhashankar, Ata Mohamed, Lobo, Nirasha	Social	Sharda Film Company; DOP: Chimanlal Luhar
Karna The True Battler a.k.a. Maharathi Karna	Baburao Painter	Keshavrao Dhaiber, V. Shantaram, Kamla Devi, Balasaheb Yadav, Nimbalkar, Sushilabai, Nandrekar, Maya, Zunzharrao Pawar, Anasuya, Tukaram Mandhere	Mythology	Maharashtra Film Company; DOP: S. Fatelal
Katil Kathlani a.k.a. La Belle	N. Majumdar	D. Billimoria, Putli, Jilloobai	Social	Imperial Film Company
Kelor Kirti	Sudhansu Mustafi	Bela Rani, Lalu Bose, Niharbala	Comedy	Aurora Film Co., Calcutta; DOP: Debi Ghosh
Kichak Vadha a.k.a. Sairandhari	Baburao Painter	Nimbalkar	Mythology	United Pictures Syndicate
Kunji Kishori	Kanjibhai Rathod	Rampyari, Haider Shah, Gulab, Durga, Nizam, Haridas		Gujarat Studio; DOP: Chaturbhai Patel
Lady Of The Lake a.k.a. Sarovar Ki Sundari	Rama Choudhary	Ermeline, Jilloobai, Zebunisa, Yakub, Elizer, Madanrai Vakil, Baburao	Fantasy	Imperial Film Co. DOP: Boman Irani
Lakho Fullani			Legend	Royal Arts Studio
Love And Romance a.k.a. Mohabbat Ke Musibat	M. M. Vaidya			Saurashtra Film Co., Rajkot
Lure Of Lust a.k.a. Moh-Jaal	Nirbhoy Thakkar, M. Udwadia			Saurashtra Film Co., Rajkot

== M-P ==
Title	Director	Cast	Genre	Notes Cinematographer
Madalsa			Religious	Hindustan Cinema Film Company
Madhuri	Rama Choudhary	Sulochana, (Ruby Myers), D. Billimoria, Vakil, Jilloobai, Madanrai Vakil	Historical	Imperial Film Company; DOP: Adi Irani, Irani Ardeshir
Magic Valley a.k.a. Maya Mahal	Nanubhai Desai	Zebunisa, Janibabu	Fantasy	Sharda Film Company; DOP: Naval Bhat
Malhari Martand	Ganpat Shinde	Bhaurao Datar, Kashibai Pathak, Joshi, Shelar		Hindustan Cinema Film Co., Nasik; DOP: Telang
Maya Mohini	Keshavlal Joshi	Gulab, Gangaram, Durga, Nizam	Fantasy	Gujarat Film Company; DOP: Gordhanbhai Patel
Naag Padmini	N. G. Deware	Fatma Begum, Raja Sandow, Yakbal, Thomas, Jumna, Nargis	Devotional	Kohinoor Film Company; DOP: N. G. Deware
Nara Kesari a.k.a. Lion Of Maharashtra	K. P. Bhave	Udwadia, Nalini, Dwarkee, V. B. Jagtap	Historical	Jagtap Film Company; DOP: V. B. Jagtap
Neelam Manek a.k.a. The Blue Jewel	Kanjibhai Rathod	Gulab, Rampyari, Asha, Keshavlal, Durga, Chandra, Gangaram	Social	Krishna Film Company; DOP: Gordhanbhai Patel
Nishiddha Phal a.k.a. Forbidden Fruit	Kali Prasad Ghose	Kali Prasad Ghose, Renubala, Bhanu Bannerjee Sr., Nimai, Nivanani Devi, Prafulla, Renubala, Bhanu Bannerjee Sr., Nimai, Nivanani Devi, Prafulla, Atul Gangopadhyay, Narendranath Singa, Sukriti Devi	Social	Indian Kinema Arts, Calcutta; DOP: Noni Gopal Sanyal
Our Hindustan a.k.a. Our India a.k.a. Amru Hindustan	C. H. Shah	Shahzadi, Anasuya, Dinshaw Billimoria, Tayeb		Elphin Cinema Co. DOP: C. H. Shah
Padmalata a.k.a. Lily In The Mud	D. A. Dandekar	Nandram, Lila, P. R. Joshi, Salma Nizam, Gangaram	Costume	Gujrat Studios; DOP: Gordhanbhai Patel
Pataal Padmini a.k.a. The Beauty From Hell	Harshadrai Mehta	Zebunisa, Nandram, Jani Babu, Joshi, Nirasha	Fantasy	Sharda Film Company; DOP: Chimanlal Luhar
Patel Ketu	K. P. Bhave	Tara, Keshav Narayan Kale, Rustom Irani, Sakhu, Jamshedji		Imperial Film Company
Pauper Princess	Ramakant, Gharekhan	Mohini, Jai Kishan Nanda, Mary, Roy, Baba Vyas	Costume	Jagdish Film Co. DOP: G. G. Gogate
Parshuram	Dasaheb Phalke		Mythology	Hindustan Cinema Film Company
Prisoners Of Love a.k.a. Raj Tarang	Harshadrai Mehta	Master Vithal, Zebunisa, Prabhashankar, Alibux, Lobo	Costume	Sharda Film Company; DOP: Chimanlal Luhar
Puran Bhagat	Pesi Karani	Ermeline, Rustom, Sakhu, Jilloobai, Khansaheb, Gohar Jr. Jamhedji	Devotional	Imperial Film Company; DOP: Rustom Irani

== R-S ==
Title	Director	Cast	Genre	Notes Cinematographer					
Raj Kumar a.k.a. Raj Kunwar		Krishnabai		New India Film Company, Nasik					
Ram Rajya Viyoga			Religious	Hindustan Cinema Film Company, Nasik					
Roop Basant a.k.a. Madan Mohana a.k.a. Beautiful Woman	Haribhai Desai	Master Bachu, Miss Mohna, Baburao Gade, Wmanrao, D. N. Potdar, Gangoobai, Jairam, Fayma	Costume	Suvarna Pictures D. B. Chauhan					
Rukmani Haran			Mythology	Hindustan Cinema Film Company, Nasik					
Sainted Devil a.k.a. Ek Abla	Bhagwati Prasad Mishra	Ermeline, Asoobhai, Putli, Misra, Jillo Bai, J. Rustom Irani, Ghory, Bhagwati Mishra, Yusuf	Social	Imperial Film Co.					
Sarla a.k.a. Sarala	Amritlal Bose, Priyanath Ganguly	Seeta Devi, Durgadas Bandyopadhyay, Rani Sundari, Naresh Mitra, Chittaranjan Goswami, Sailen Chowdhury, Manorama, Prabodh Bose	Social	Madan Theatres Ltd.					
Sassi Punnu a.k.a. Sassi Punhu	Harshad Rai Mehta	Master Vithal, Zebunisa, Mani, A. P. Kapoor, Lobo	Legend Romance	Sharda Film Co.	Sati Pingala	G. V. Sane	Bhaurao Datar, Gangubai Mohite	Devotional	Hindustan Cinema Film Company, Nasik
Second Wife a.k.a. Punarlagna Ni Patni	Nagendra Mazumdar	Mehtab, Yusuf, Salvi, Gangu	Social	Kaiser-E-Hind Film Co.					
Shamsher Pratigna	R. N. Vaidya, Jamnadas Subedar	Kumudini, R. N. Vaidya, Baba Vyas, Ghanshyam	Costume	Shree Jagdish Film Co. D. D. Dabke					
Shasti Ki Shanti	Jyotish Banerjee	Nath Ghosh, Ahindra Chowdhary, Tara Sundari, Durgadas Bannerjee, Danibabu, Jainarayan Mukherjee, Tarasundari, Prabavathi, Prabavathi, Kartik Dey, Kantibhusan Bandyopadhyay Tulsi Banerji	Social	Madan Theatres Ltd.					
Shree Dwarkadheesh a.k.a. Shri Dwarkadhish	Ramakant Rangnath, Gharekhan	Pramoth Bose, Kadambari, Ghanshyam, Baba Vyas, Roy	Devotional	Shree Jagdish Film Co.					
Shree Krishna Shishtai	Dadasaheb Phalke		Religious	Hindustan Cinema Film Company, Nasik					
Silver Cloud a.k.a. Varachat Vidhwa	Maneklal Joshi	Rampyari, Salvi, Kumudini	Socia	Excelsior Film Co.					
Sneh Jyoti a.k.a. Love Flame	Raja Sandow, R. N. Vaidya	Putli, Raja Sandow, Shanta Kumari, Baba Vyas, Dabir, Ghanshyam, R. N. Vaidya		Shree Jagdish Film					
Soni Mahiwal	Anand Prasad Kapoor	Master Vithal, Zebunisa, Mani, Himmat	Legend Romance	Sharda Film Co.	Sudarshan	Dadasaheb Phalke		Religious	Hindustan Cinema Film Company, Nasik

== T-Z ==
Title	Director	Cast	Genre	Notes Cinematographer
The Love Flame	Nanubhai Vakil	Shanta Kumari, Putli, Raja Sandow	Social	Jagdish Film Co.
Traitor a.k.a. Namak Haram	N. D. Sarpotdar	Meera, P. N. Varne, Durgabai Korgaonkar, Dattoba Rajwade, Jadhav	Historical	Aryan Film Co.
Udan Tappu a.k.a. Vagabond	N. D. Sarpotdar	Dattoba Rajwade, Durgabai Korgaonkar, Krishnaji Ghanekar, P. N. Varne, Hansa, Jadhavrao, Das	Social	Aryan Film Co. DOP: Y. D. Sarpotdar
Up-To-Date a.k.a. Akalna Bardan	Prafulla Ghosh	Gulab, Noor Mohammad Charlie, Wadilal, Sandow, Jehangir	Social	Krishna Film Company; DOP: Chaturbhai Patel, Gordhanbhai Patel
Vasant Leela a.k.a. Sons Of The Rich	N. G. Deware (Narayan Deware)	Shakuntala Tembe, Fram Sethna, Jal Balsara, Noor Mohammed Charlie, Raja Babu, Panna, Siraj, Fatma Jr.	Social	Artistic Pictures (JBH Wadia); DOP: Gajanan S. Devare
Vasavdatta	Nagendra Mazumdar	Putli, Jani Babu, Athavle	Historical	Kaiser-E-Hind Film Co.
Veer Ramani			Costume	Alexandra Film Company
Veerangana	Homi Master	Khalil, Yakbal, Shivabai, Heera	Costume	Kohinoor Film Company; DOP: K. G. Gokhale
Vengeance a.k.a. Raj Rang	Bhagwati Prasad Mishra	Sulochana, Jillo Bai, D. Bilimoria, Elizer, Jamshedji	Social Action	Imperial Film Co. DOP: Rustom Irani
Vigathakumaram a.k.a. The Lost Child	J. C. Daniel	J. C. Daniel	Social	First Malayalam feature film. J. C. Daniel
Vile Woman a.k.a. Kal Ratri Nu Khooni Khanjar	K. Rathor	Rampyari, Haider Shah, Gulab, Nandram, Vishnu	Costume	Krishna Film Co. DOP: Chaturbhai Patel
Vishwamohini a.k.a. The Enchantress	Chandulal Shah	Gohar, Meena Devi, Raja Sandow, Vaidya, E. Bilimoria	Social	Shree Jagdish Film Co. DOP: Pandurang S. Naik
Wife And The Vampire a.k.a. Prem Ane Vaasna a.k.a. Sansar Nauka	Lalitarai Vyas			British India Film Co., Saurashtra Film Co., Rajkot
Wine Of Youth a.k.a. Saundarya Sura	Harshad Rai Mehta	Master Vithal, Mani, A. P. Kapoor, Lobo	Social	Sharda Film Co. DOP: Chimanlal Luhar
Wise Fool a.k.a. Madan Manjari	Pesi Karani	Ermeline, Jamshedji, Dinkar, Tara, Asooji, Khan	Costume	Imperial Film Co.
