= Topsfield =

Topsfield may refer to:

- Topsfield, Maine
- Topsfield, Massachusetts
  - Topsfield (CDP), Massachusetts, a census-designated place
- Andrew Topsfield, Keeper of Eastern Art at the Ashmolean Museum
