= Anarkali =

Legendary courtesan of Mughal India

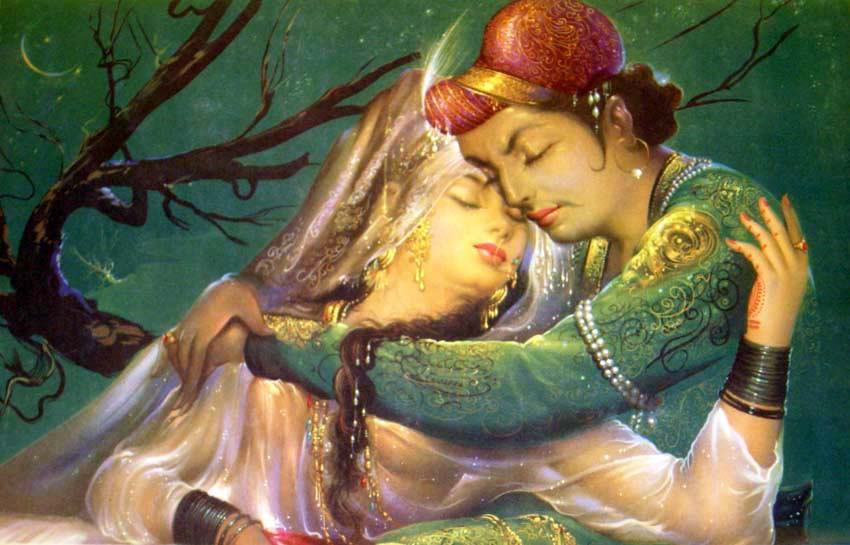
Depiction of Prince Salim and Anarkali, 1940

Anarkali (lit. 'pomegranate blossom') is a legendary young woman said to be loved by the 17th-century Mughal Prince Salim, who later became Emperor Jahangir. According to some accounts, Anarkali was the nickname of the courtesan (tawaif) Mehr-un-Nisa, though scholars hold varying opinions.

According to speculative and fictional accounts, Anarkali had an illicit relationship with Salim, the son of Mughal Emperor Akbar, who had her executed by immurement. The character often appears in movies, books and historical fiction, most notably depicted in the 1960 Bollywood film Mughal-e-Azam in which she is portrayed by Madhubala.

== Historicity and development ==
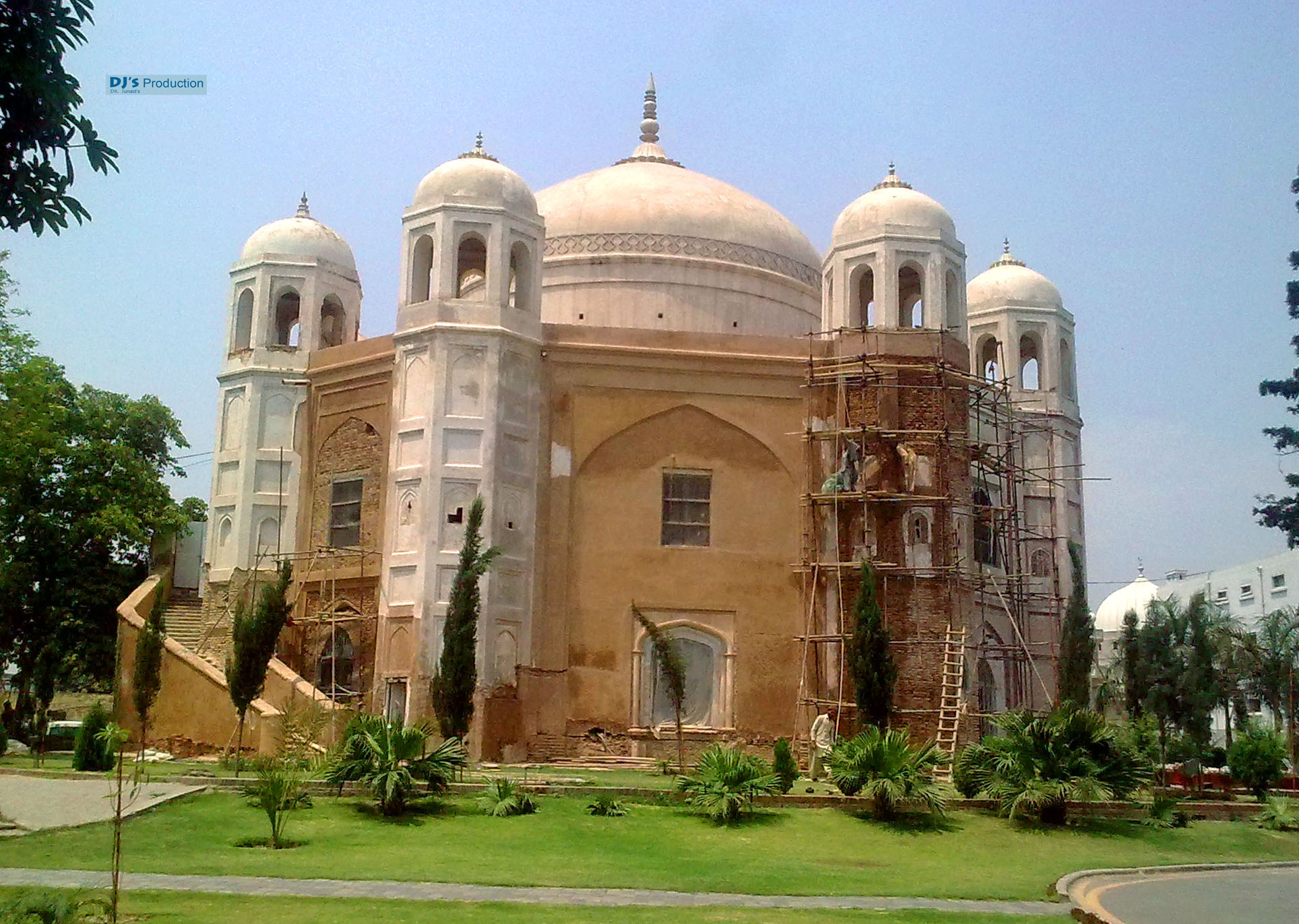
The possible Tomb of Anarkali, in the Pakistani city of Lahore.

Anarkali was first mentioned in the journal of the English tourist and trader William Finch, who visited the Mughal Empire on 24 August 1608.

=== Western traveller accounts ===
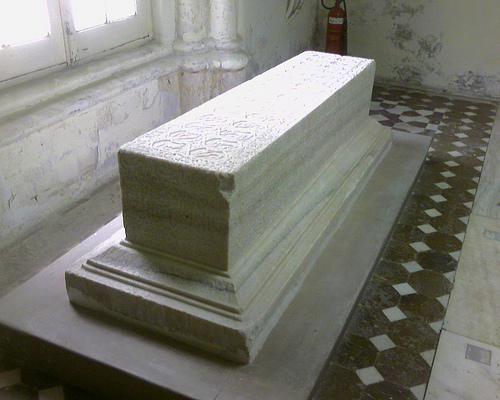
The richly carved white marble cenotaph at the Tomb of Anarkali bears inscription: Could I behold the face of my beloved once more, I would thank God until the day of resurrection.

The earliest known Western accounts of the alleged relationship between Salim and Anarkali were written by the English travellers William Finch and Edward Terry. Finch arrived in Lahore in February 1611, approximately eleven years after Anarkali's supposed death, while traveling on behalf of the East India Company. His account, written in the early seventeenth century, provides the following description:

... is a faire monument for Don Sha his mother, one of the Akbar his wives, with whom it is said Sha Selim had to do ( her name was Immaeque Kelle, or Pomgranate kernell); upon notice of which the King [Akbar] caused her to be inclosed quicke within a wall in his moholl, where she died, and the King [Jahangir], in token of his love commands a sumptuous tomb to be built of stone in the midst of four square garden richly walled, with a gate and divers roomes over it. The convexity of the tomb he hath willed to be wrought in workes of gold with a large faire jounter with roomes over—head... (sic) ~ William Finch. (Note: Don Sha his mother→ Mother of Daniyal Mirza Acbar→Emperor Akbar, Sha Selim Prince Salim i.e. Emperor Jahangir, Immaeque Kelle → Most probable misspelling of Anarkali by ~ William Finch (Later traveler Edward Terry spells it clear enough so they are referring to name 'Anarkali' William Finch is referring to Mother of Daniyal Mirza, While no proof she was a Akbar's wife but both the travellers seem to refer her as Akbar's wife. moholl→ Misspelling of word 'Mahal' meaning 'palace' From William Finch is referring to the tomb separately So not clear if place of death and tomb are same or different from his account Most likely construction of the tomb was incomplete until 1615 while Finch visited in 1611 * Also see Anarkali#Personalities and timeline section below)

Anarkali had a relationship with Prince Salim. Upon notice of the relationship, Akbar ordered her to be enclosed within a wall of his palace, where she died. Subsequently, Jahangir, as a token of his love, ordered a stone tomb to be built in the centre of a walled, four-square garden surrounded by a gate. As per the description given by Finch, Jahangir ordered the dome of the tomb to be wrought in works of gold.

Edward Terry, who visited a few years after William Finch, wrote that Akbar had threatened to disinherit Jahangir for his relationship with Anarkali, the emperor's most-beloved wife, but on his death-bed he repealed the threat.

=== The legends ===
According to Lisa Balabanlilar, the majority of legends present Anarkali as a part of Akbar's harem, as a spouse, a concubine or a servant. Thus, as per Muni Lal, Anarkali was a maidservant in the household of Salim's mother, Mariam-uz-Zamani. A common thread across the various accounts is that after realizing the likelihood of an amour between his son Salim and Anarkali, Akbar got incensed and ordered to ensepulchre Anarkali alive in a wall. This brutality enraged Salim and caused him to rebel against his father.

=== Scholarly claims and discourse ===
==== Inscription ====
The gravestone in the tomb for Anarkali bears the inscription:

Could I behold the face of my beloved once more,
I would thank God until the day of resurrection.
~ Majnun Salim Akbar

According to Andrew Topsfield, in his book Paintings from Mughal India, (p. 171 n. 18) Robert Skelton has identified these verses as being from the 13th-century poet Saʿdī.

==== Jahangir as Majnun ====
According to Ebba Koch, Jahangir perceived himself as a Majnun prince king, who is almost mad in his love for his beloved. Ebba Koch says that he had his name inscribed as Majnun on the Anarkali's sarcophagus and had pictorials of himself painted as Majnun king; as late as 1618, he reared a pair of Sarus cranes, which are considered in Indian culture to be love birds named Layla and Majnun. Koch observed their breeding and wrote about them with keen interest. According to art historian Ram Nath the Salim Anarkali love legend can not be entirely fabricated myth since nobody would have had the courage to inscribe his name in public as a Majnun (passionate lover) without his approval. Nath says, Jahangir held his father Akbar in very high regard in his autobiography, still in 1599 he rebelled against Akbar and one most possible reason could be that his romance with Anarkali was frustrated by Akbar.

==== Prominent guesses about who the Anarkali was ====
- It was just a pomegranate garden.
- Anarkali as a wife of Emperor Akbar who fell in love with his son Jahangir
- Anarkali was a concubine of Emperor Akbar(and Prince Daniyal's mother) who fell in love with his son Jahangir.
- Anarkali was one of the wife of Jahangir speculated either Sahib-i Jamal or Nur Jahan

===== Just a pomegranate garden =====
According to Haroon Khalid, irrespective of incestuous relationship in popular imagination, it is very unlikely that an emperor's concubine would have fallen in love with his rebellious son. Khalid says that the pomegranate garden is mentioned by Dara Shikoh, the grandson of Jahangir, in his work "Sakinat al-Auliya" as a location where the saint Mian Mir used to sit. According to Subhash Parihar, Dara also mentions the existence of a tomb in the garden but does not give it a name. According to Muhammed Baqir, the author of "Lahore Past and Present", Anarkali was originally just the name of the garden in which the tomb of Sahib-i-Jamal, one of the wife of Jahangir, was situated. The tomb later came to be named as that of Anarkali.

===== Sahib-i Jamal =====
According to Muhammed Baqir, the tomb of Anarkali belonged to a woman named Sahib-i Jamal, a wife of Salim, the mother of the prince's second son Sultan Parvez and a daughter of the noble Zain Khan Koka. The daughter of Zain Khan was married to Salim on 18 June 1596.

According to Akbar Nama, Jahangir "became violently enamoured of the daughter of Zain Khan Koka. Akbar was displeased at the impropriety, but he saw that his heart was immoderately affected, he, of necessity, gave his consent" The translator of Akbar Nama, H. Beveridge, said Akbar objected to the marriage because the Prince was already married "to Zain Khan's niece" (the daughter of paternal uncle of Zain Khan, and hence Zain Khan's cousin). Akbar objected to the marriage of near relations.

According to Aniruddha Ray, the inscribed year 1599 and the name Salim are important since if it was built after he became emperor his regnal name Jahangir would have been used instead. Ray says according to historians Akbar left Lahore on 6 November 1598, so it would be difficult to assume Akbar gave the order for the entombment in 1599. Ray says that Sahib-i Jamal died in 1599 so the tomb may be hers.

===== Sharf-un-Nissa =====
According to Haroon Khalid, a chronicler named Noor Ahmad Chishti in his Tehqiqat–i–Chishti first published in 1849 notes Anarkali or Sharf-un-Nissa as Emperor Akbar's favorite concubine. According to Tehqiqat–i–Chishti, Anarkali died while Akbar was on his Deccan campaign. Khalid says that while Chishti's book does not speak about a love affair with Salim, it was around the same time that Salim rebelled against his father. Khalid says one possibility might also be that Akbar had the mausoleum built after his return from the Deccan campaign.

Khalid says the popular narrative still remains that Anarkali was Akbar's concubine who crossed the line and fell in love with Salim, Akbar's son. He says that according to Tareekh-e-Lahore, an 1892 book by Sayed Abdul Latif, Anarkali's original name was Sharf-un-Nissa. According to Ellison Banks Findly, Anarkali's name was Nadira Begum. Findly states that according to European traveller Finch, Anarkali was actually the mother of prince Daniyal. Findly quotes Latif who described Anarkali as a concubine and according to him, Akbar observed Anarkali smile back at Salim in a mirror and suspected the worst, leading him to entomb the lady in a wall while she was still alive. The same had been mentioned by Finch ".. upon notice of which the King [Akabar] caused her to be inclosed quicke within a wall in his moholl, where shee dyed, .." According to Lisa Balabanlilar, usually it is considered that Jahangir married at least 20 times. Findly says that if the assumed date of Anarkali’s death is correct then Salim would have already entered into several marriages and had three sons by then. Accordingly, it would have been out of character for Salim to have been madly in love in an incestuous relationship. However, the legend of Salim and Anarkali still persists. Khalid provides the same narrative as Latif which was later used as inspiration by fiction writers beginning with Imtiaz Ali Taj's 1922 play 'Anarkali'.

===== Prince Daniyal's mother =====
Basing his analysis on the above two accounts, Abraham Eraly, the author of The Last Spring: The Lives and Times of the Great Mughals, wrote there "seems to have been an oedipal conflict between Akbar and Salim". He also considers it probable that Anarkali was the mother of Prince Daniyal Mirza.

Eraly supports his hypothesis by quoting an incident recorded by Abul Fazl, Akbar's court historian, according to whom, Salim was assaulted one evening by the guards of Akbar's royal harem. A madman wandered into Akbar's harem because of the carelessness of the guards. According to Abul Fazl, Salim caught the man but was himself mistaken for the intruder. The emperor arrived and was about to strike the "intruder" with his sword when he recognised Salim. According to this theory, the intruder might have been Prince Salim and that the story of the mad man was concocted to hide the prince's actions.

According to Subhash Parihar, the accounts of the British travellers, and consequently the presumption of Eraly, is unlikely because Prince Daniyal's mother died in 1596, which does not match the dates inscribed on the sarcophagus.

===== Nur Jahan =====
Nur Jahan's first husband Sher Afghan died in a skirmish with Jahangir's foster brother Qutbuddin Koka in 1607. Jahangir fell in love with Nur Jahan and married her on 25 May 1611. According to Masudul Hasan and also Lisa Balabanlilar, a popular legend exists that Jahangir saw Nur Jahan in childhood and was attracted to her but Akbar had not given him permission to marry her; when Jahangir ascended the throne he got her husband killed and married her. Art historian Ram Nath gives credence to this theory saying for unknown reasons Nur Jahan's first marriage to Sher Afghan took place in 1599 when she was almost 22, quite late for a woman of that time. Nath says it is quite possible that Jahangir might have seen her, and shown interest but his father Akbar denied permission taking political considerations into account. Nath says that while modern biographers like Beniprasad do not put faith in this legend, there are contemporary mentions of the legend. Nath points out that De Laet mentioned that a contemporary traveler Pelsaert said that Jahangir loved Nur Jahan even before her marriage to Sher Afghan but Akbar intervened otherwise. According to Nath, it is not impossible for Jahangir to have engineered the murder of Nur Jahan's first husband (1607) and suppressed the real cause of the conflict of his love interest.

Hasan and also Balabanlilarsay say that this legend has been proven to be historically false. Jahangir became attracted to and married Nur Jahan when she was in her 30s and Jahangir in his 40s. According to Archana Garodia Gupta, the legend of the prior love with Nur Jahan is unlikely because after Nur Jahan's first marriage with Sher Afgan, Jahangir had accompanied him on a campaign to Mewar and also awarded a title on Sher Afgan.

According to other accounts, after Akbar's death, Salim (Jahangir) recalled Anarkali and they married. She was given a new name, Nur Jahan.

Nur Jahan died in 1645, 18 years after Jahangir's death and she was buried in her tomb near the tomb of Jahangir at Shahdara, Lahore.

==== Opinion of historian Ram Nath ====
Art historian R. Nath said Jahangir had no wife on record bearing the name or title Anarkali, to whom the emperor could have built a tomb and dedicated a couplet with a suffix Majnun. He writes:

[it is] absolutely improbable that the grand Mughal emperor would address his married wife as yar, designate himself as majnun and aspire to see her face once again. Had he not seen her enough? Obviously she was not his married wife but only his beloved, to whom he would take the liberty to be romantic and a little poetic too, and it appears to be a case of an unsuccessful romance of a disappointed lover... The prince could not save her, though it is on record that he was so unhappy with his father in this year 1599 that he defied his orders and revolted. It may be recalled that Mehrunissa (later Nurjahan Begum) was also married to Sher Afgan the same year and the young Prince was so dejected and disturbed on the failure of his two romances and annihilation of his tender feelings of love that he went as far as to defy Akbar.

== Personalities and timeline ==
Personality	Who is who	Respective Time line
Anarkali	The lover in the legend of Emperor Jahangir - Anarkali; Alternatively just the name of a historic pomegranate garden in Lahore.	
Majnun Salim Akbar	Emperor Jahangir himself	31 August 1569– 28 October 1627 Reign: 3 November 1605 – 28 October 1627
Akbar	Mughal Emperor and father of Jahangir	October 1542– 27 October 1605) Reign:1556 to 1605
Daniyal Mirza	Third son of Emperor Akbar the Great and the brother of the Emperor Jahangir.	11 September 1572 – 19 March 1605
Sahib i-Jamal	Wife of Jahangir mother of Salim's second son, Prince Parviz. daughter of Khwaja Hasan of Herat, making her the cousin of Zain Khan Koka	died c. 25 June 1599
Khas Mahal	Daughter of Zain Khan Koka Married to Salim on 18 June 1596	
Daughter of Khawaja Hasan	Wife of Salim i.e. Jahangir	
Nur Jahan (born Mehr-un-Nissa,	The twentieth (and last) wife of the Mughal emperor Jahangir married him in 1611. She was the favourite wife of Jahangir.	31 May 1577 – 18 December 1645

== Fictional portrayals ==
Anarkali has been the subject of a number of Indian, Bangladeshi and Pakistani books, plays and films. The earliest, most-celebrated historical play about her, Anarkali, was written by Imtiaz Ali Taj in Urdu and performed in 1922. The play was made into a film The Loves Of A Mughal Prince, which was released in India in 1928 and stars Taj as Akbar. Another Indian silent film about the tawaif, Anarkali, was released in 1928 by R.S. Choudhury, who remade it in Hindi with the same title in 1935. Bina Rai portrayed Anarkali in Anarkali, a 1953 Indian film. In 1955, Akkineni Nageswara Rao and Anjali Devi starred in Anarkali. Kunchacko directed Anarkali, an Indian Tamil-language film, in 1966.

In 1960, K. Asif's landmark film Mughal-e-Azam was released in India with Madhubala in the role of Anarkali and Dilip Kumar as Prince Salim. According to Katherine Butler Schofield, while as per rumor peddled by European travelers, the emperor Akbar ensepulchred Anarkali alive, the movie Mughal-e-Azam gives the historical legend a twist wherein Akbar himself lets Anarkali run away clandestinely. Schofield says in this case film producer seemingly twists the plot finding it difficult to reconcile an idealized national hero of modern times had been legendarily cruel enough to entomb a woman alive. In 1979, Telugu superstar N. T. Rama Rao directed and acted in the film Akbar Salim Anarkali, featuring himself as Akbar, Nandamuri Balakrishna as Salim and Deepa as Anarkali.

In Pakistan, Anarkali was released in 1958 with Noor Jehan in the titular role, based on the Imtiaz Ali Taj play/script as adapted by Qamar Ajnalvi for Anwar Kamal Pasha's direction. Iman Ali portrayed Anarkali in Shoaib Mansoor's short music video series on the theme Ishq (transl. love) in 2003.

In the 2013 Ekta Kapoor's television series Jodha Akbar, she was portrayed by Heena Parmar while Saniya Touqeer played young Anarkali. A daily soap titled "Dastan-e-Mohabbat...Salim Anarkali" in which Prince Salim is played by Shaheer Sheikh and his beloved Anarkali by Sonarika Bhadoria, was aired on Colors TV.

In 2022 TAJ, a webseries, started. Following the first season 'Anarkali' played a prominent role in the first half of the series.

== See also ==
- Tomb of Anarkali
- Layla and Majnun
- Anarkali Bazaar
- Madhubala

== Bibliography non-fictional ==
- Dad, Aisha. 2022. 'Through the Looking Glass': The Narrative Performance of Anarkali. Doctoral dissertation, Harvard University Graduate School of Arts and Sciences.
- Nath, Prof R.. India As Seen by William Finch (1608-11 A.D): (With an Introduction to Medieval Travelogue). N.p., Independently Published, 2020.
- Sen Gupta, Subhadra. MAHAL: Power and Pageantry in the Mughal Harem. India, Hachette India, 2019.
- Early Travels in India, 1583-1619. India, Alpha Editions, 2020.
- Choudhry, Zulfiqar Ali. Anarkali. United Kingdom, Whyte Tracks publishing, 2017.
- Khawaja, Mabel Deane. “The Entombed Slave Girl of the Moguls: A Victim of Imperialism.” International Journal of Critical Cultural Studies, vol. 14, no. 2, June 2016, pp. 1–9. EBSCOhost, https://doi.org/10.18848/2327-0055/cgp/v14i02/1-9.
- Moosvi, Shireen. The invention and persistence of a legend—The Anārkalī story. Studies in People's History, Volume: 1 issue: 1, page(s): 63-68. Article first published online: June 1, 2014; Issue published: June 1, 2014 https://doi.org/10.1177/2348448914537345
- Schofield, Katherine Butler. (2012), The Courtesan Tale: Female Musicians and Dancers in Mughal Historical Chronicles, c.1556–1748. Gender & History, 24: 150-171. https://doi.org/10.1111/j.1468-0424.2011.01673.x
- Sharma, Sunil. “Forbidden Love, Persianate Style: Re-Reading Tales of Iranian Poets and Mughal Patrons.” Iranian Studies, vol. 42, no. 5, 2009, pp. 765–779., doi:10.1080/00210860903306044
- Glover, William J.. Making Lahore Modern: Constructing and Imagining a Colonial City. United Kingdom, U of Minnesota Press, 2008.
- Lal, Ruby. Domesticity and Power in the Early Mughal World. United Kingdom, Cambridge University Press, 2005.
- Chaudhry, Nazir Ahmad. Anarkali, Archives and Tomb of Sahib Jamal: A Study in Perspective. Pakistan, Sang-e-Meel Publications, 2002.
- Bāqir, Muḥammad. Lahore: Past And Present (being An Account Of Lahore Compiled From Original Sources). India, Low Price Publications, 1996.
- Asher, Catherine Ella Blanshard, et al. Architecture of Mughal India. United Kingdom, Cambridge University Press, 1992. p 118.
- Quayum, Mohammad A. "From A String of Sweet Pearls, Vol. II (1922)". The Essential Rokeya. Leiden, The Netherlands: Brill, 2013. https://doi.org/10.1163/9789004255876_004 Web.
- H.Beveridge, Visit to Umarkot, Calcutta Review. India, University of Calcutta, 1900. Page 67, 68, 69
- Jahangir (1829). Memoirs of the Emperor Jahangueir. Translated by David Prince. London: Oriental Translation Committee.
- Panjab Gazetteer. India, n.p, 1883. Page 177.

=== Bibliography fiction and literature ===
- Bombay Cinema's Islamicate Histories. United Kingdom, Intellect Books Limited, 2022.
- Ray, Neil. The Autobiography of Time: The Saga of Human Civilization: Ambition, Greed and Power from the Dawn of Man. United Kingdom, Archway Publishing, 2020. Semi fiction
- Sharma, Manimugdha. Allahu Akbar: Understanding the Great Mughal in Today's India. India, Bloomsbury Publishing. 2019
- Isaac, Megan Lynn. Suzanne Fisher Staples: The Setting Is the Story. United Kingdom, Scarecrow Press, 2009.
- Sundaresan, Indu. The Twentieth Wife: A Novel. United States, Washington Square Press, 2003.
- Reviewed Work: Anarkali, a Sanskrit Play in ten acts, by V. Raghavan Palsule, G. B. Annals of the Bhandarkar Oriental Research Institute, vol. 54, no. 1/4, 1973, pp. 301–03. JSTOR, JSTOR 41692219.
- Taj, Afroz. Two Anarkalis: Saghar Nizami’s Dream Drama and the Deconstruction of the Parsi Theatre. Southeast Review of Asian Studies Volume 32 (2010), pp. 177–92.
- DÉSOULIÈRES, ALAIN. Religious culture and folklore in the Urdu historical drama Anarkali, revisited by Indian cinema. Book: Indian Literature and Popular Cinema, 2007. Routledge ISBN 9780203933299
- Rini Bhattacharya Mehta (2011) Ur-national and secular mythologies: popular culture, nationalist historiography and strategic essentialism, South Asian History and Culture, 2:4, 572-588, doi:10.1080/19472498.2011.605300

== Sources ==
- Banks Findly, Ellison (11 February 1993). Nur Jahan: Empress of Mughal India. Oxford, UK: Nur Jahan : Empress of Mughal India. ISBN 9780195074888.
- Hasan, Shaikh Khurshid (2001). The Islamic Architectural Heritage of Pakistan: Funerary Memorial Architecture. Royal Book Company. ISBN 978-969-407-262-3.
- Lal, Muni (1980). Akbar. New Delhi: Vikas Publishing House. ISBN 978-0-7069-1076-6.
