= The Light of Asia (oratorio) =

1886 oratorium by Dudley Buck about the life of the Buddha

The Light of Asia is an oratorio by the American composer Dudley Buck. The libretto is based on Edwin Arnold's 1879 epic poem The Light of Asia, or The Great Renunciation. According to Howard Smither in History of the Oratorio, it was the first oratorio in the history of the genre to be based on the life of Buddha. It was composed in 1886 and published that same year as piano/vocal score by Novello. Its first public performance took place in Washington, D.C., on 6 May 1887. Two years later it premiered in London at St James Hall and became the first oratorio by an American composer to have been produced in Britain.
