= Seeta Devi (actress) =

Indian actress (1912–1983)

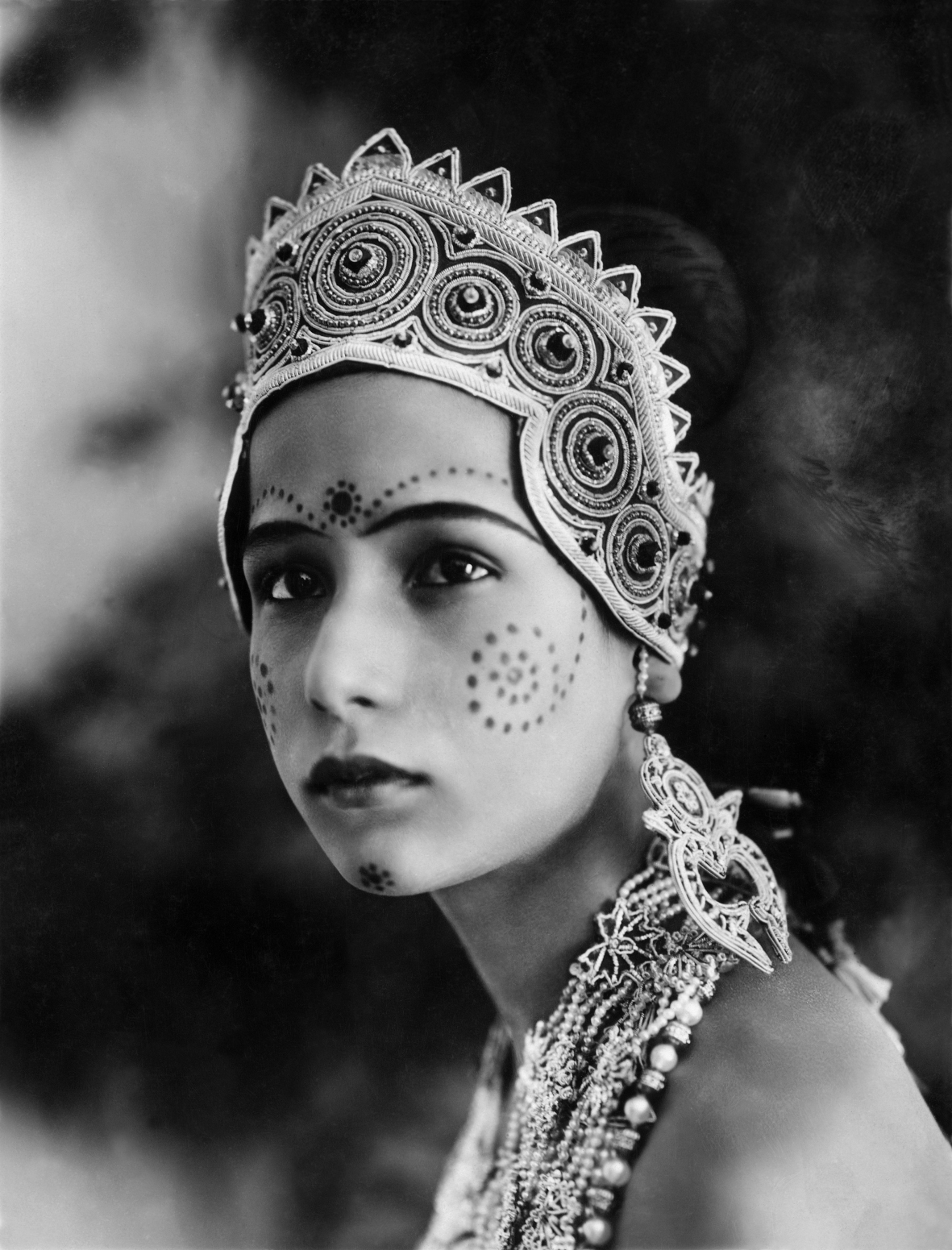
- Seeta Devi in her debut film Prem Sanyas (1925)
- Born: Renee Smith; 15 October 1912; Bengal Presidency, British India
- Died: 1983 (aged 70–71); India
- Other names: The Brightest Star In The Indian Cinema World; Sita Devi; Rane Smith; Devi. Sita
- Citizenship: British Indian (1912-1947); Indian (1947-1983)
- Occupations: Actress; Singer; Director; Producer
- Years active: 1922–1957
- Relatives: Percy Smith (sister)

Renee Smith (15 October 1912 – 1983), known professionally as Seeta Devi, was an Indian actress and a prominent star of the silent film era. She was one of the early stars of silent films in the Indian film industry. Discovered by filmmaker Himanshu Rai, she became the face of several landmark Indo-European co-productions, including the acclaimed "oriental trilogy" directed by Franz Osten. Seeta was the first actress to play Anarkali on screen, in Charu Roy's The Loves Of A Mughal Prince (1928).

Seeta was known as The Brightest Star In The Indian Cinema World. Seeta's films were very popular in Europe and she had a mass followers of fans from England, Germany, Poland and Austria. Along with Ermeline, Ruby Myers, Sabita Devi and Patience Cooper, she is credited as a "leading star" of the 1920s and 1930s who had more mass appeal than their male counterparts.

She is stated to be one of the "prominent" leading ladies of the "pioneering era" of Indian cinema along with Mehtab, Bibbo, Durga Khote, Gohar, Devika Rani, Susan Solomon and Indira Devi.

== Early life ==
Devi was born Renee Smith in 1912 to an Anglo-Indian family. In the early Indian film industry, Anglo-Indian actresses were often preferred for their light complexion, which was favored by contemporary cinematic standards. She was given the stage name "Seeta Devi" by Himanshu Rai when she was cast in her debut film at the age of thirteen.

== Career ==
=== Discovery and rise to fame ===
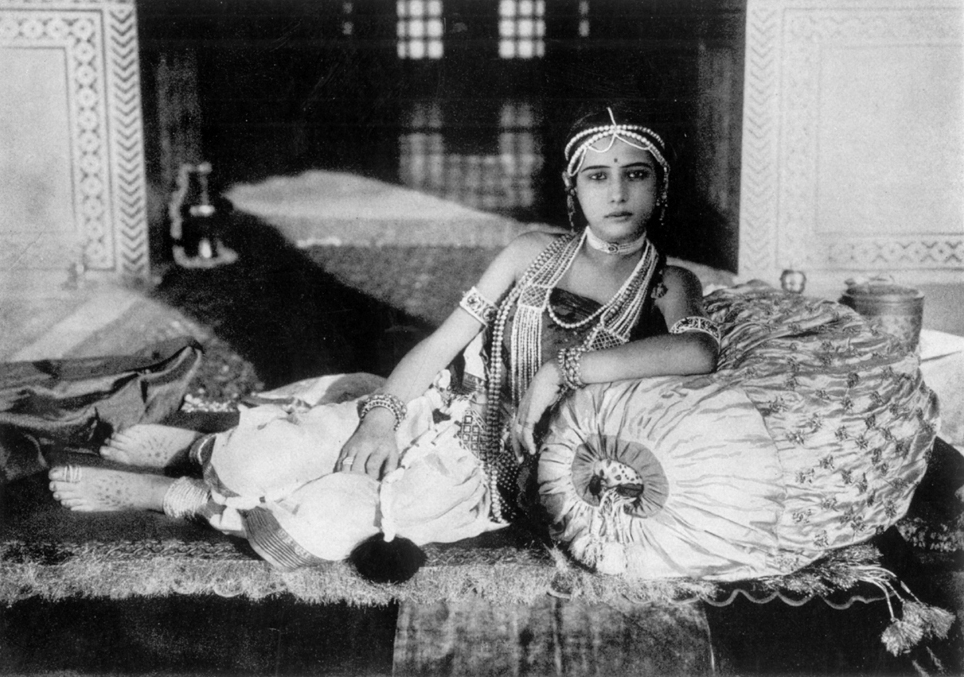
Seeta Devi as Princess Gopa in scene from the film, Prem Sanyas (The Light of Asia) 1925

In 1922, she made her debut as a child actress and acted in film Indrajit in a supporting role. Devi made her screen debut in lead role in Prem Sanyas (1925), also known as The Light of Asia, playing the role of Gopa. The film was a major international success, particularly in Europe, and established her as an overnight star.

She became a central figure in a trilogy of films produced by Rai's Great Eastern Film Corporation in collaboration with the German company Emelka and British Instructional Films.

Three of her most successful films were: The Light of Asia, Shiraz, and Prapancha Pash. She worked in Shiraz a romance about the construction of the Taj Mahal, where Devi played the "other woman," a manipulative rival to Mumtaz Mahal. A Throw of Dice (Prapancha Pash, 1929) which was an epic drama based on an episode from the Mahabharata. All three of these films were made through the collaboration of German film director Franz Osten and Indian actor-producer Himanshu Rai along with Bavarian company Emelka. This unique trilogy were connected to three different religions and based on three different stories of Indian history/mythology: The Light of Asia was based on the life of Buddha, Shiraz was based on construction of the Taj Mahal and Prapancha Pash, better known by its English title A Throw of Dice, was based on a story from the Mahabharata. Seeta Devi was the leading actress in all these three films, though the role in Shiraz was that of 'the other woman'.

=== Madan Theatres and later silent films ===
Beyond her work with Rai and Osten, Devi was a star for Madan Theatres in Calcutta. She appeared in several film adaptations of Bankim Chandra Chatterjee's novels, including Durgesh Nandini (1927), Kapal Kundala (1929), and Krishnakanter Will (1926).

In the late 1920s, Devi travelled to Paris to seek roles in European films but was told she did not look "Indian enough" for the exotic expectations of Western producers.

Later she directed a film Bharat Ramani (also known as The Enchantress of India) in 1930 and she acted in the lead role. The same year she directed and produced Kal Parinaya (also known as Fatal Marriage) and she portrayed the role of Kishori.

=== Talkie films ===
Like many silent era stars, she struggled with the transition to "talkies". With the coming of sound, Seeta found a lull in her career, as it now required an actor to be proficient in Hindustani. She took some break from acting and learned the language, she made her comeback with the talkie version of Rose of Kashmir (1931) which became popular at the box office as her fans got to hear her voice and talk on screen for the first time despite her struggling with the dialogues the film became famous. Her early talkie film credits include Naseeb Ni Balihari (1931) and Shikari (1932) both films were hits at the box office. She continued acting into the early sound era with films like Raja Gopichand (1933) which was a hit film at the box office. Devi retired from acting and the screen in the early 1933 following the introduction of sound in Indian cinema.

=== Playback singing and retirement ===
In 1956, Devi contributed as a playback singer later in her career, notably for the 1956 film Badal Aur Bijli.

== Personal life ==
Seeta's sister Percy Smith was also an actress; it was believed that the sisters alternatively appeared as "Seeta Devi".

== Death ==
She died in 1983 at the age of 71 in India.

== Filmography ==
=== Film ===
==== Silent Movies ====
Year	Film	Role	Notes
1922	Indrajit		Debut film
1922	Bemata		
1923	Yayati		
1923	Step Mother		
1925	Prem Sanyas	Princess Gopa	
1926	Krishnakanter Will (1926 film)	Bhramar	
1926	Light of Asia		
1926	Durgesh Nandini One	Tilottama	
1927	Durgesh Nandini Two	Tilottama	Produced by Madan Theatres
1928	Sarla		
1928	Sarala	Sarala	
1928	Shiraz	Selima	
1928	The Loves Of A Mughal Prince	Anarkali	Also titled Rajmahal Ni Ramani
1928	Bhrantri		(Mistake)
1929	Kapal Kundala		
1929	A Throw of Dice	Sunita	(Prapancha Pash)
1930	Bharat Ramani		(The Enchantress of India)
1930	Kal Parinaya	Kishori	(Fatal Marriage)

==== Talkie Movies ====
Year	Film	Role	Notes
1931	Rose of Kashmir		
1931	Nasih Ni Balihart		
1932	Shikari		
1933	Raja Gopichand	Shehzadi	

==== Director ====
Year	Film	Role	Notes
1930	Bharat Ramani	Director	(The Enchantress of India)
1930	Kal Parinaya	Director	(Fatal Marriage)

==== Producer ====
Year	Film	Role	Notes
1930	Kal Parinaya	Producer	Producer and director

==== Playback singer ====
Year	Film	Role	Notes
1956	Badal Aur Bijli	Singer	Playback singer
