= Behula (disambiguation) =

Behula is a protagonist in the Manasamangal genre of medieval epics.

Behula may also refer to:

- Behula (1921 film), an Indian silent film
- Behula (1966 film), a Bengali film
- Behula (TV series), a 2010 mythological Bengali television serial
- Behula railway station, a railway station on the Bandel–Katwa line
