= A Throw of Dice =

1929 film by Franz Osten

Prapancha Pash (A Throw of Dice)
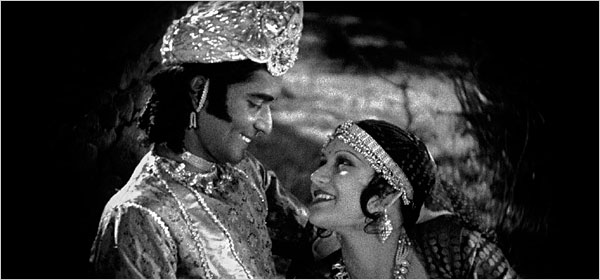
- Charu Roy and Seeta Devi in the 1929 film Prapancha Pasha (A Throw of Dice)
- Directed by: Franz Osten
- Written by: W.A Burton; Max Jungk; Niranjan Pal (story)
- Produced by: Nadine Luque; Tim Pearce; Himansu Rai; Bruce Wolfe
- Starring: Seeta Devi; Himansu Rai; Charu Roy; Modhu Bose
- Cinematography: Emil Schünemann
- Music by: Willy Schmidt-Gentner; Nitin Sawhney (2006)
- Distributed by: (International) Fandango (U.K) BFI (British Film Institute); UFA
- Release date: 16 August 1929
- Running time: 74 min
- Countries: Germany; British India; United Kingdom

A Throw of Dice, 1929

A Throw of Dice (Prapancha Pash) is a 1929 silent film by German-born director Franz Osten, based on an episode from the Indian epic Mahabharata.

== Plot summary ==
The movie is about two kings vying for the love of a hermit's daughter, the beautiful Sunita. The two kings, Ranjit and Sohan, share a passion for gambling and decide to play a game of dice to determine who will marry her. Sunita wishes to marry Ranjit, but Ranjit loses the game to the nefarious Sohan who cheats by using a crooked dice. As a forfeit, Ranjit becomes his slave. Sunita soon uncovers the truth about Sohan's evil deeds, and to escape punishment, he hurls himself from a cliff into the rapids. Ranjit and Sunita are reunited and married.

== Cast ==
- Seeta Devi as Sunita
- Himansu Rai as Sohan
- Charu Roy as Ranjit
- Modhu Bose
- Sarada Gupta as The Hermit
- Lala Bijoykishen
- Tincory Chakrabarty

== Production ==
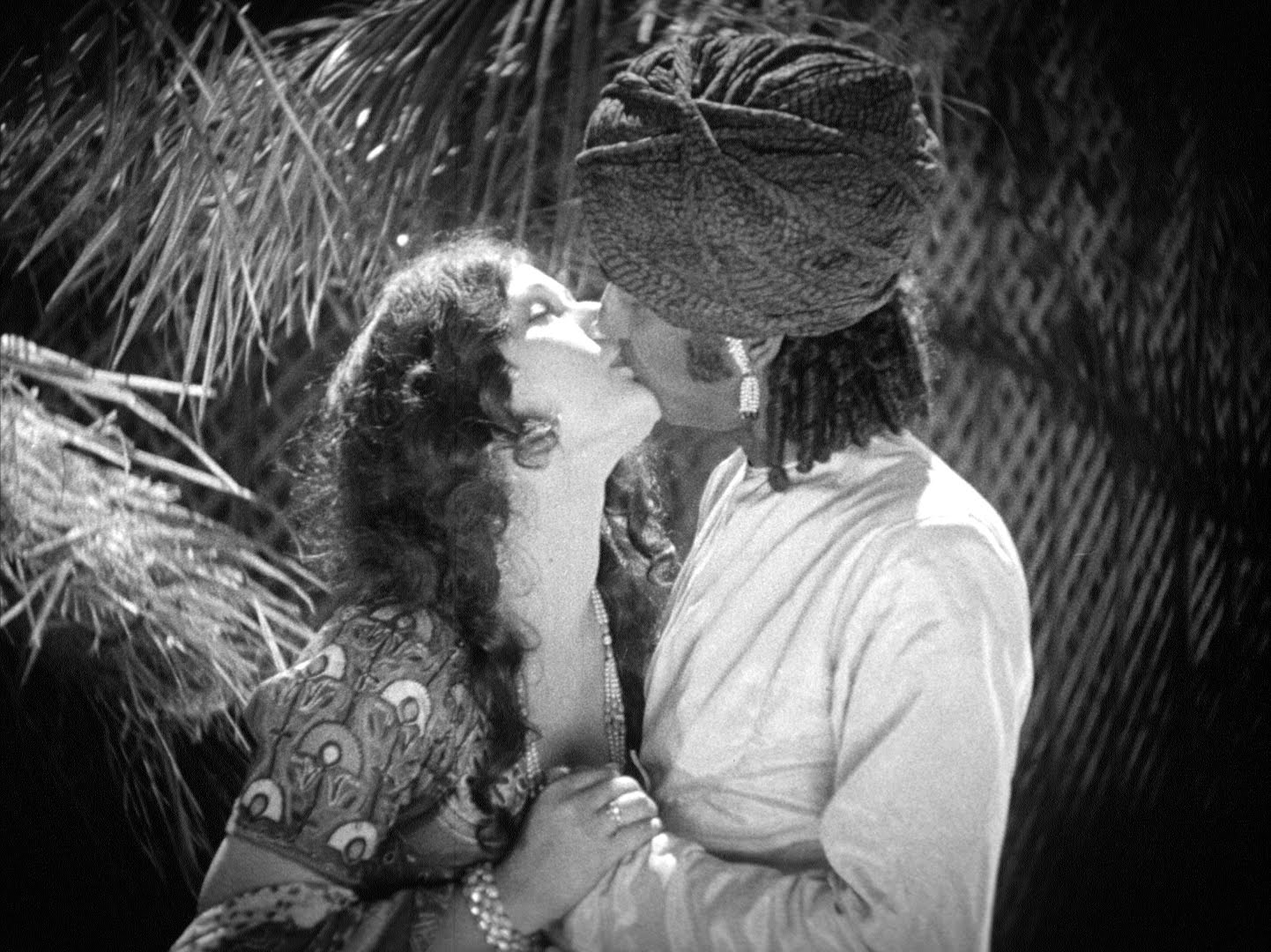
Seeta Devi and Charu Roy kissing each other

A Throw of Dice, the third Indian film by Franz Osten, is considered by some to be his greatest achievement. The silent film was shot in black and white on 35mm film. It contains thousands of cast members and animals, including 10,000 extras, 1,000 horses and scores of elephants and tigers. The film was shot on location in Rajasthan.

Osten made 19 films in India from 1926 to 1939, and A Throw of Dice formed the final part of a trilogy of Indo-German productions by Osten and Indian actor-producer Himanshu Rai. The other two films in the trilogy are Prem Sanyas (1925) and Shiraz (1928). After a gap, Osten returned to India and worked on Bombay Talkies with Rai. During the production of Kangan (The Bangle) in 1939, Osten, a member of the Nazi Party, was arrested by British colonial officials, and was he incarcerated until the end of the Second World War.

== Restoration and re-release ==
A Throw of Dice has been in the British Film Institute (BFI)'s archives since 1945, but it rarely has been seen. In 2006, in honour of the 60th anniversary of Indian independence, the film was digitally restored, then re-released at the Luminato Festival in Toronto, Canada on 13 June 2008 with a new orchestral score by British Indian composer Nitin Sawhney. The release in the United States occurred on 30 July 2008 during the Grant Park Music Festival at the Jay Pritzker Pavilion in Chicago. Nitin Sawhney, composer of the new 2006 score, describes the film as "A cross between Chaplin, Cecil B. DeMille and an early Bollywood movie." On multiple occasions, it has been compared to a Cecil B. DeMille film for its levels of extravagance.

Nishat Khan composed an orchestral score, which premiered on 25 April 2013, as part of the 100 Years of Indian Film festival at Siri Fort Auditorium in New Delhi, and the composer played sitar and sang, accompanied by the Bollywood Orchestra. This Sitar composition by Ustad Khan was updated and performed with the Philharmonie Luxembourg on 15 October 2025 under the direction of Ellie Slorach and arranged/accompanied by David Clymer.

== Reception ==
On the review aggregator website Rotten Tomatoes, 100% of 8 critics' reviews are positive, with an average rating of 7.4/10.

Upon its re-release in 2007, a review in The New York Times stated "There’s hardly a frame in the 1929 film A Throw of Dice that doesn’t provide a surge of visual pleasure", and Peter Bradshaw, a reviewer for The Guardian, wrote that it is "a rare and fascinating gem". The Observer reviewer Philip French called it "a remarkable silent movie".
