= The Light of Asia =

1879 book by Sir Edwin Arnold

The Light of Asia; or, The Great Renunciation
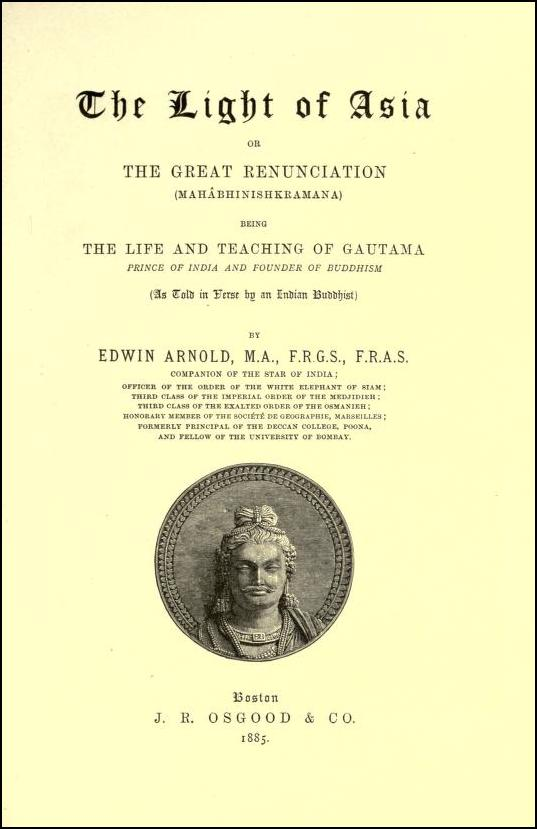
- Title page of the 1885 edition
- Author: Sir Edwin Arnold
- Language: English
- Published: 1879

The Light of Asia, or The Great Renunciation (Mahâbhinishkramana), is a book by Sir Edwin Arnold. The first edition of the book was published in London in July 1879.

In the form of a narrative poem, the book endeavours to describe the life and time of Prince Siddharta Gautama, who, after attaining enlightenment, became the Buddha, the Awakened One. The book presents his life, character, and philosophy in a series of verses. It is a free adaptation of the Lalitavistara Sutra.

A few decades before the book's publication, very little was known outside Asia about the Buddha and Buddhism. Arnold's book was one of the first successful efforts to popularise Buddhism for a Western readership. After receiving the poem from theosophists, Mahatma Gandhi was awed and his subsequent introduction to Madame Blavatsky and her Key to Theosophy inspired him to study his own religion.

The book has been highly acclaimed from the time it was first published and has been the subject of several reviews. It has been translated into over thirty languages, including Hindi.

== Summary ==
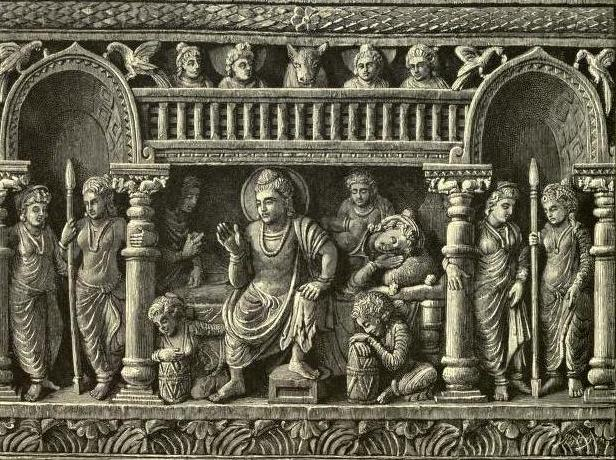
Frontispiece to the 1885 edition.

The 1892 publication begins with the following dedication: This Volume is Dutifully Inscribed to the Sovereign, Grand Master, and Companions of the Most Exalted Order of the Star of India by the Author. Sir Arnold's preface ends with him stating:

The time may come, I hope, when this book and my Indian Song of Songs and Indian Idylls will preserve the memory of one who loved India and the Indian peoples.

The first six chapters deal with the early part of Buddha's life – his birth as Siddhartha, prince of Kapilavastu, Lumbini, Nepal; his gaining first-hand knowledge of the sufferings of mankind; his resorting to meditation; and his ultimate transformation as the Enlightened One after long years of meditation. The subsequent chapters speak of the Buddha's travels and the important elements of the message he spread are discussed — for instance, that suffering is a built-in aspect of existence; that craving for sensuality and identity is the root of suffering, and that suffering can be ended. It calls for right understanding; right thought; right speech; right action; right livelihood; right effort; right mindfulness; and right concentration. Throughout his peregrinations, mostly in eastern India, Gautama Buddha was joined by thousands of disciples and admirers from all walks of life.

== Influence ==
Dasu Narayana Rao son of Mahakavi Dasu Sriramulu adopted part of this book and wrote a play in Telugu language entitled Sangeetarasa Tarangini anu Buddha Natakamu. He wrote two chapters and part of third chapter and died of some illness in 1905. Rest of the play was completed by the father and it was published in 1907.

In his autobiography, Mahatma Gandhi writes of when two theosophist brothers gave him a copy of The Light of Asia along with Arnold's version of the Bhagavad Gita, The Song Celestial, while he studied in London. Gandhi recalls: "Once I had begun it I could not leave off." The brothers also brought Gandhi to the Blavatsky Lodge and introduced him to Madame Blavatsky. Upon reading her Key to Theosophy, Gandhi was stimulated to read more on Hinduism, now "disabused [...] of the notion fostered by the missionaries that Hinduism was rife with superstition."

Kavimani Desigavinayagam Pillai brought out a Tamil translation of the work, titled Asia Jothi in 1941.

Former Indian minister Jairam Ramesh wrote The Light of Asia: The Poem that Defined the Buddha on The Light of Asia's phenomenal influence on how people see the Buddha and his teachings, calling the poem a "milestone in Buddhist historiography" that "impacted so many public personalities in different countries, inspired movements for social equality and incarnated itself in music, dance, drama, painting and film."

== Adaptations ==
The Light of Asia

A film adaptation of the poem directed by Franz Osten and Himansu Rai titled Prem Sanyas (The Light of Asia in English, Die Leuchte Asiens in German) was made in 1925 and restored for rerelease by Arte in 2001. The Indo-European co-production was filmed in Lahore with the cooperation of the reigning Maharajah of Jaipur, made by German technicians and featuring Indian actors. The film is well-regarded for avoiding the exotic-orientalism normally found in Western portrayals of Indian culture.

Dudley Buck used the book as the basis for an oratorio, The Light of Asia, first performed in London, 1887. It was the first American-composed oratorio to be produced in Britain, premiering at St. James's Hall.

In the 1945 movie version of Oscar Wilde's The Picture of Dorian Gray (1891), as the protagonist turns to a life of depravity, a friend tries to turn him back to a good life by lending him a copy of The Light of Asia.

== See also ==
- Dhammacakkappavattana SuttaLalitavistara Sūtra
- Great Renunciation
