= The Song Celestial =

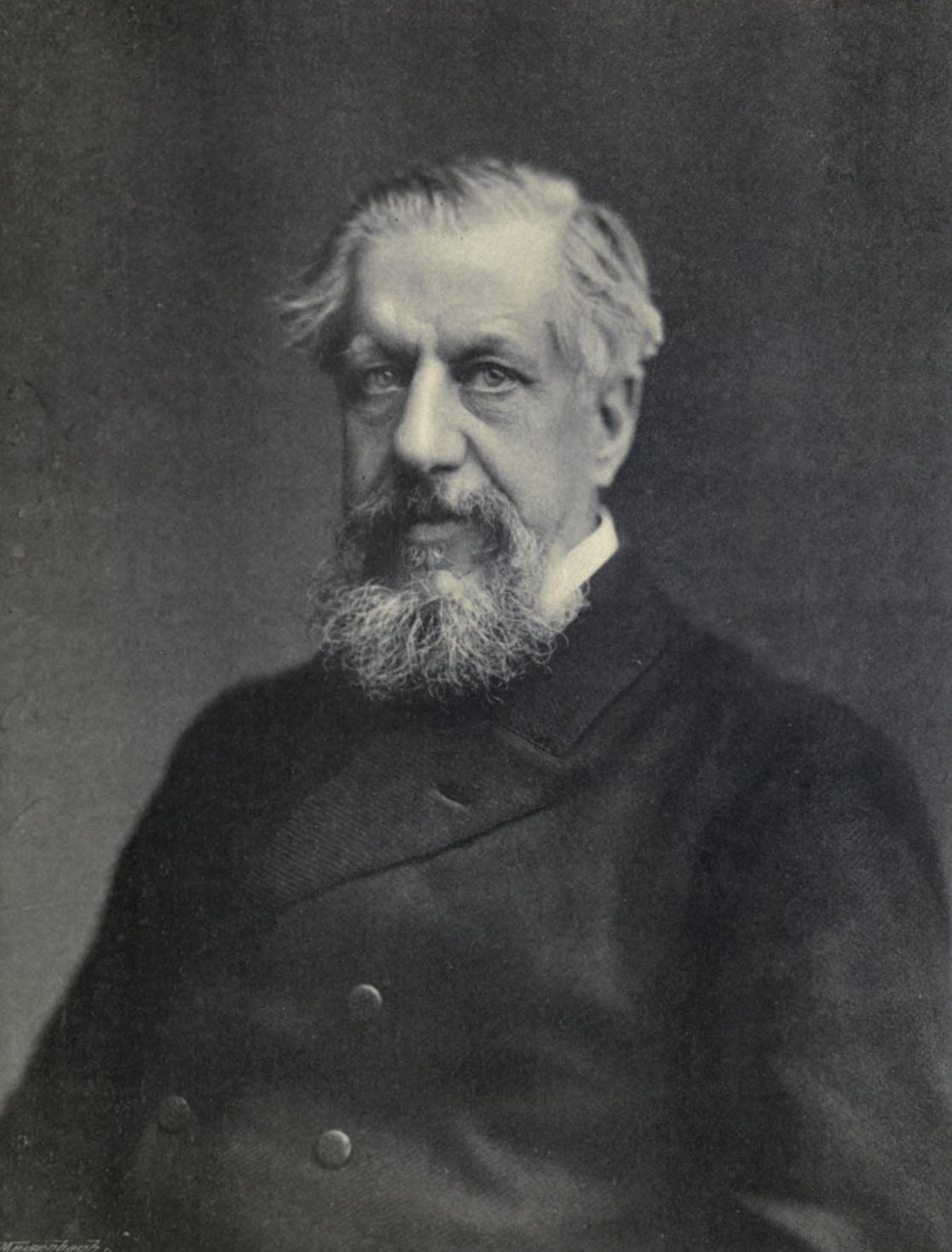
- Photograph of Edwin Arnold, c. 1897
- Author: Sir Edwin Arnold
- Language: English
- Published: 1885

The Song Celestial: A Poetic Version of the Bhagavad Gita is a translation of the Bhagavad Gita (a part of the Mahabharata) from Sanskrit into English by Sir Edwin Arnold, first published in 1885. The translation following The Light of Asia, his narrative-poem of the Lalitavistara Sūtra. It is dedicated to India with the following preface:

So have I read this wonderful and spirit-thrilling speech, By Krishna and Prince Arjuna held, discoursing each with each; So have I writ its wisdom here, - its hidden mystery, For England; O our India! as dear to me as She!

In his autobiography, Mahatma Gandhi recalled when two theosophist brothers gave him The Song Celestial during his studies in England. This was the first time Gandhi had ever read the Gita, as he had never read it in Sanskrit nor in Gujarati. Gandhi adored this version, stating: "I have read almost all English translations [...] and I regard Sir Edwin Arnold's as the best." Gandhi also invited Edwin Arnold to be the vice-president of the Vegetarian Society in London.

== Summary ==
The book summarizes itself as the following: Krishna, who is regarded as an incarnation of the Divine, then instructs Arjuna on the way of duty and liberation through right action. The message he enunciates is applicable to people of all Faiths and all ages, for the battle to be fought, not only by mankind as a whole but for each individual, is the eternal one between right and wrong, between wisdom and ignorance, between the Self and not-Self.

== Chapters ==
The chapters are listed as follows:

1. The Distress of Arjuna
2. The Book of Doctrines
3. Virtue in Works
4. The Religion of Knowledge
5. Religion of Renouncing Works
6. Religion of Self-Restraint
7. Religion by Discernment
8. Religion by Service of the Supreme
9. Religion by the Kingly Knowledge and the Kingly Mystery
10. Religion by the Heavenly Perfections
11. The Manifesting of the One and Manifold
12. Religion of Faith
13. Religion of Separation of Matter and Spirit
14. Religion of Separation of the Qualities
15. Religion by Attaining the Supreme
16. The Separateness of the Divine and Undivine
17. Religion by the Threefold Faith
18. Religion by Deliverance and Renunciation

== See also ==
- Bhagavad Gita
- The Light of Asia
