= Edwin Lester Arnold =

British writer

Edwin Lester Linden Arnold (14 May 1857 – 1 March 1935) was an English writer. He was the son of journalist and poet Edwin Arnold, and spent his childhood between England and India. His best-known work is Lieut. Gullivar Jones: His Vacation which is one of the earliest examples of the planetary romance sub-genre.

== Life and literary career ==
Arnold was born in Swanscombe, Kent, as son of Sir Edwin Arnold. Most of his childhood was spent in India, but he returned to England to study agriculture and ornithology. He became a journalist in 1883, and published his first books A Holiday in Scandinavia (1877) and Bird Life in England (1887) before writing his first novel The Wonderful Adventures of Phra the Phoenician, the adventures of a warrior who goes in and out of an unexplained state of suspended animation in order to be a witness to invasions or attempted invasions of England. Phra was first published in 24 parts in the prestigious Illustrated London News, and later published in book form in the United States and the United Kingdom.

He wrote several pieces of shorter fiction, including the novelettes "The Story of Ulla", which was published in Short Stories magazine in March 1892, and "Rutherford the Twice-Born", which was published in the Idler magazine in May of the same year. These and eight other stories were collected in The Story of Ulla and Other Tales in 1895.

Arnold later wrote two other novels. The first was Lepidus the Centurion: A Roman of Today (1901), which flopped commercially. In 1905 Arnold published his best known novel, Lieut. Gullivar Jones: His Vacation, also known as Gulliver of Mars, (1905). Its initial reception was lukewarm, and he published only a few short stories in later years. However, it was later seen as an important precursor of the planetary romance sub-genre.

== Legacy ==
Arnold's Lieut. Gullivar Jones: His Vacation is considered important to 20th century science fiction literature, in that it may have inspired the Edgar Rice Burroughs Barsoom series, which was written six years later. Indeed, both Gullivar and Burroughs's character John Carter, first seen in A Princess of Mars (1917), are military men from the Southern United States who arrive on Mars and have numerous adventures, including falling in love with a Martian princess.

Ace Books reprinted Arnold's Lieut. Gullivar Jones: His Vacation in 1964, retitling it Gulliver of Mars [sic]. A more recent Bison Books edition was issued as Gullivar of Mars, adapting the Ace title to Arnold's spelling.

Marvel Comics did a brief comic version of Gullivar of Mars during the early 1970s, possibly as a reaction to DC gaining the rights to publish Burroughs' John Carter during this time. With art by Gil Kane, it ran in several issues of Creatures on the Loose. Marvel's Gullivar was a Viet Nam vet, and the series started in modern times. Though the series used many of Arnold's characters and concepts, the series was not a strict adaptation of the original book.

Both Gullivar and John Carter make an appearance at the beginning of volume two in Alan Moore's League of Extraordinary Gentlemen comic book series.

== Bibliography ==
=== Fiction ===
- The Wonderful Adventures of Phra the Phœnician (US 1890, UK 1891) 1893 edition at the Internet Archive
- The Constable of St. Nicholas (1894)
- The Story of Ulla and Other Tales (1895)
- Lepidus the Centurion: A Roman of Today (1901) (Internet Archive e-text)
- Lieut. Gullivar Jones: His Vacation (1905)

=== Non-fiction ===
- A Summer Holiday in Scandinavia (1877) (Internet Archive e-text)
- Coffee: Its Cultivation and Profit (1886) (Google Books e-text)
- Bird Life in England (1887) (Internet Archive e-text)
- England as She Seems: Being Selections from the Notes of an Arab Hadji (1888)
- On the Indian Hills: or, Coffee-planting in Southern India (1893) ( Internet Archive e-text)
- The Soul of the Beast (1960)
