= Tama Kurokawa =

Wife of Edwin Arnold

Kurokawa, c.1900

Tama Kurokawa, Lady Arnold (Japanese: 黒川玉, Hepburn: Kurokawa Tama; 1869–1962) was the third wife of Sir Edwin Arnold. She was born in Sendai City, Japan on November 21, 1869. At the time of her marriage in 1897 she was said to be the only Japanese woman bearing an English title. She and Sir Edwin lived in London where she wore her kimono in the privacy of her home but western clothes in public. She was the only family member present when her husband died in 1904.

In 1924, she participated in an international convention in Hastings and St Leonards-on-Sea organized by Princess Karadja, founder of the White Cross Union.

In 1928, she was a member of the Japan Society, London.
