= Shiraz (film) =

1928 film

- Swedish theatrical release poster
- Directed by: Franz Osten
- Written by: William A. Burton
- Produced by: Himansu Rai
- Starring: Himansu Rai; Enakshi Rama Rau; Charu Roy; Seeta Devi
- Cinematography: Emil Schünemann; Henry Harris
- Distributed by: British Instructional Films; UFA; Himansu Rai Film
- Release date: 26 September 1928 (United Kingdom)
- Running time: 118 minutes
- Countries: India; United Kingdom; Germany

Full film

Shiraz (Shiraz: A Romance of India) (Das Grabmal einer großen Liebe in German) is a 1928 silent film, directed by Franz Osten and starring Himansu Rai and Enakshi Rama Rau. It was adapted from a stage play of the same name by Niranjan Pal, and based on the story of the commissioning of the Taj Mahal – the great monument of a Mughul prince for his dead queen. Due to the public's apathy towards silent films, a sound version was also produced in 1929. While the sound version has no audible dialog, it features a synchronized musical score with sound effects along with a theme song.

== Plot ==
Shiraz is a potter's son, who is brought up as brother to Selima, a girl of unknown but royal lineage who was rescued from an ambush in childhood. Shiraz falls in love with Selima as a young adult and when she is kidnapped by slavers and sold to Prince Khurram, Shiraz follows her to Agra, where he will risk a horrible death to protect her and one day design her great memorial.

== Cast ==
- Himansu Rai as Shiraz
- Enakshi Rama Rau as Selima/Empress Mumtaz Mahal
- Charu Roy as Prince Khurram/Emperor Shah Jahan
- Seeta Devi as Dalia

== Music ==
The sound version of the film featured a theme song entitled “The Song of Shiraz (An Oriental Reverie)” by Eric Valentine (words) and Harry Collman (music).

== Production ==
The film was shot in Jaipur. It was an Indian/British/German co-production, and the second of three silent films made on location in India by star and producer Himansu Rai. The others are Prem Sanyas (The Light of Asia, 1926) and A Throw of Dice (Prapanch Pash, 1929).

=== Restoration ===
Shiraz was restored from original film elements by the BFI National Archive in 2017, and had its premiere as a gala screening at the 2017 London Film Festival, accompanied by a new score composed and performed by Anoushka Shankar. The Guardian's film critic Peter Bradshaw praised the film as " a startlingly ambitious epic weepie-romance". The restored version subsequently played in a number of venues in India in late 2017. The film was shown as part of the BFI London Film Festival's lineup at We Are One: A Global Film Festival in 2020.
