= Bharati Balak =

1930 film

- Directed by: Agha Hashar Kashmiri
- Starring: Patience Cooper
- Release date: 1930
- Country: British Raj
- Language: Hindi

Bharati Balak is a Bollywood film. It was released in 1930.

== Cast ==
- Patience Cooper
- Dadi Sarkari
- Mohammad Isaq
- Mohan
- Sharifa
- Surajram
