= Krishnakanter Will (1926 film) =

- Directed by: Priyanath N. Ganguly
- Story by: Krishnakanter Will by Bankim Chandra Chatterjee
- Produced by: Madan Theatres
- Starring: Durgadas Bannerjee; Patience Cooper; Sita Devi
- Cinematography: Charles Creed; Jatin Das
- Release date: 10 October 1926
- Country: India
- Language: Silent (Bengali intertitles)

Krishnakanter Will is an Indian silent drama film directed by Priyanath N. Ganguly based on the 1878 same name novel of Bankim Chandra Chatterjee. This film was released on 10 October 1926 under the banner of Madan Theatres and it is the first cinematic adaptation of the novel.

== Plot ==
Zamindar Krishnakanta Ray decides to distribute his estate in equal share to his nephew, Gobindalal and his son, Haralal. Dissatisfied by his father's decision Haralal creates a forged will using Rohini a young widow. He manipulates her with promises of marriage if she steals and swaps the real document. During this Rohini falls in love with married person Gobindalal which creates severe friction in his domestic life.

== Cast ==
- Durgadas Bannerjee as Gobindalal
- Amrita Lal Basu as Krishnakanta
- Patience Cooper as Rohini
- Sita Devi as Bhramar
- Ahindra Choudhury
- Kanu Banerjee
- Shanti Gupta
- Prabodh Bose as Madhabinath
- Naresh Mitra
- Indu Mukhopadhyay
- Chani Dutta
- Kartik Dey
