= Sarada Ukil =

Bengali actor and artist (1888–1940)

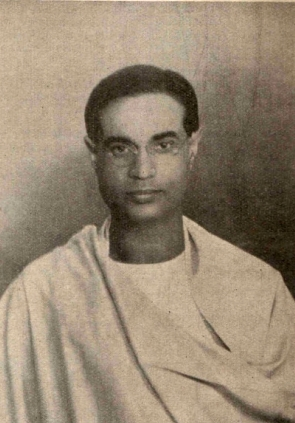
- Born: Sarada Ukil; 14 November 1888; Bikrampur, British India
- Died: 21 July 1940 (aged 51); New Delhi, British India

Sarada Charan Ukil (14 November 1888 – 21 July 1940) was a Bengali actor and artist, known for his role in the movie Prem Sanyas, "The Light of Asia", under the German director Franz Osten. Sarada was the father of Shantanu Ukil, one of the early pioneers of the Bengal School of Art.

== Biography ==
Born in 1888, Sarada Ukil was the eldest of three brothers. His two brothers were named Barada and Ranada.

Sarada Ukil was a pioneer of the New Delhi art movement between the 1920s and 1940s. Originally from Bikrampur, Dhaka, Sarada Ukil had migrated to Delhi in 1918.

In 1925, Sarada Ukil played the role of King Shuddhodana in the still movie Prem Sanyas, an Indo-European co-production. The movie depicts the life of Prince Gautama Buddha, who after enlightenment became the Buddha, or the "Enlightened one".

Around 1926 Sarada Ukil left the Modern Art School of his friend Lala Raghubir and established his home at the Esplanade Road in Delhi. There he taught art to several students and his place would become the precursor of the Sarada Ukil School Of Art, where his brothers Barada and Ranada joined him in the late 1920s. In 1994, the Sarada Ukil School Of Art was officially approved as a school for Art Teachers.
