= The Loves Of A Mughal Prince =

1928 Indian silent film

The Loves of a Mughal Prince
- Directed by: Prafulla Roy; Charu Roy
- Screenplay by: Hakim Ahmed Shuja
- Based on: Anarkali by Imtiaz Ali Taj
- Starring: Charu Roy; Seeta Devi; Imtiaz Ali Taj
- Cinematography: V. B. Joshi
- Production company: Great Eastern Film Corporation
- Release date: 1928
- Country: India
- Language: Silent film

The Loves of a Mughal Prince, also known as Anarkali and Rajmahal Ni Ramani, is a 1928 Indian silent film directed by Prafulla Roy and Charu Roy and produced by the Great Eastern Film Corporation. It is based on Anarkali, a 1922 Urdu play by Lahore-based playwright Imtiaz Ali Taj, which dramatized the tragic love affair between Mughal prince Salim and Anarkali, a slave girl. The film stars Charu Roy, Seeta Devi, Maya Devi, Rajkumari, Sawan Singh, Taj and Dewan Sharar. Roy and Taj played Salim and his father, the Mughal emperor Akbar, respectively. Devi played Anarkali, making her the first actress to portray the character on screen.

The play had been staged in 1922 and became a success, but its eventual influence on Indian cinema was not immediately apparent. Approximately five years later, in 1927, the Great Eastern Film Corporation of Delhi announced a screen adaptation titled The Loves of a Mughal Prince. The production marked Charu Roy's directorial debut. The movie was made with a big budget with the ambition of attracting audiences across all of India (rather than just a local region), which reportedly caused the production and filming process to take a long time to finish.

While The Loves of a Mughal Prince was still in production, Ardeshir Irani's Imperial Studio began work on a rival adaptation, Anarkali, starring Sulochana and directed by R. S. Choudhury. Imperial's film reached the screen first in 1928 and proved more successful than the Great Eastern production. The rivalry between these two 1928 productions helped establish the Mughal epic as a major genre of Indian cinema; according to film scholar Ashish Rajadhyaksha, it would become "the biggest genre, in terms of production scale, that the Indian cinema would ever see". The most famous subsequent adaptation was K. Asif's Mughal-e-Azam (1960), which starred Madhubala as Anarkali.

== Cast ==
- Charu Roy as Salim
- Seeta Devi as Anarkali
- Imtiaz Ali Taj as Akbar
- Maya Devi
- Rajkumari
- Sawan Singh
- Dewan Sharar
