= Edward Terry (author) =

British writer

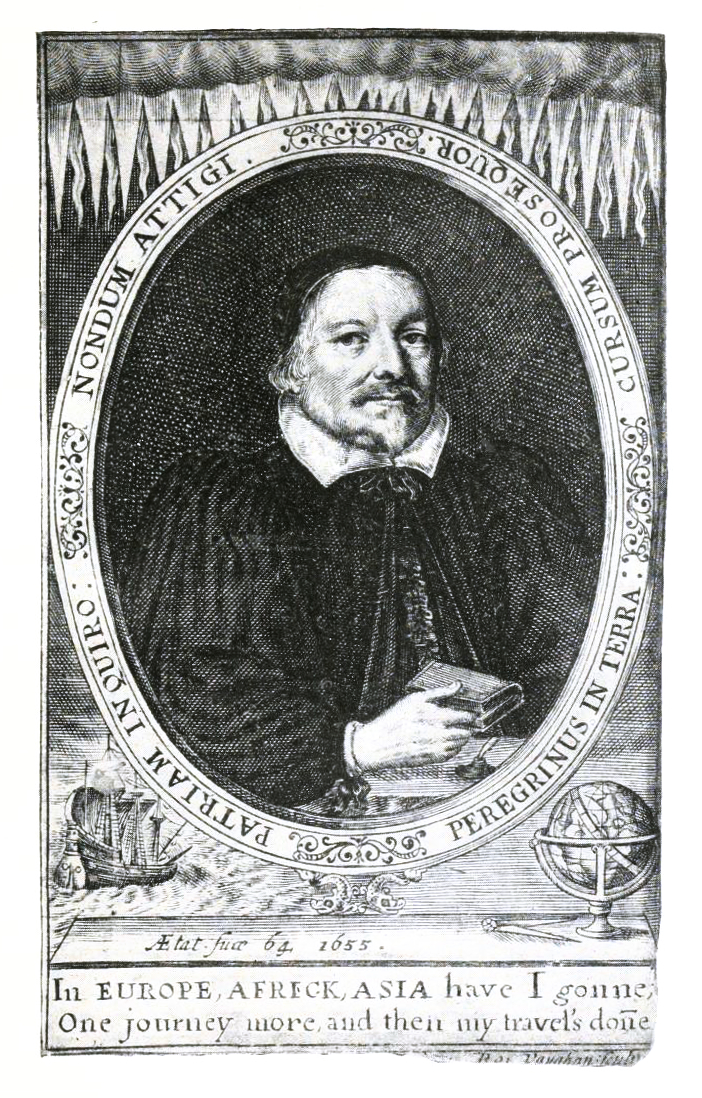

Edward Terry (1590–1660) was an English chaplain at the English embassy to the Mughal Court and an author who wrote about the Mogul empire and South Asian cuisine, with his works being heavily influenced by his religious beliefs and attitudes.

== History ==
In 1616, the British East India Company appointed Terry as one of its fleet chaplains for a trip to India. This was eighteen months after he received his Masters of Arts from Christ Church College. While en route in the Indian Ocean, the fleet engaged and destroyed a Portuguese carrack. Terry later described this battle in his work, A Voyage to East-India.

When Terry arrived in India, Sir Thomas Roe, the English ambassador, asked Terry to become the new chaplain for the English embassy. Terry's predecessor had just recently died. Terry spent the next two and half years with Roe as they followed the Mogul court of Jahangir around what is today Gujarat, India and Bihar, India.

After returning to England, Terry served as rector of the Church at Great Greenford, in Middlesex, England until his death in 1660.

== Published work ==
In 1649, Terry gave a sermon that would later be published titled The Merchants and Mariners Preservations and Thanksgiving: Or, Thankfulnesse Returned, for Mercies. Done to commemorate a successful return of company ships, Terry defends the East India Company's activities through a religious, Calvinist lens by stating that the company's success is proof of its divine favour.

In 1655, Terry published A Voyage to East-India. At that time, he claimed to have no interest in publishing his work so long after his travels. However, a manuscript copy of a short account of his travels which he had written upon his return to England and given to Charles, the Prince of Wales had come into the possession of two London printers who were keen to capitalise on the public's taste for exotica. While a version of this had been published by Samuel Purchas as “A Relation of a Voyage to the Eastern India" in his Purchas his Pilgrimes in 1625, the 1655 was much expanded. In this expanded edition, Terry added more onto his initial 1625 work, added a new section, and inserted a lengthy conclusion. These new sections dealt with capturing the essence of India and its peoples with the intent of spiritual teaching.

What distinguished Voyage was Terry's detailed descriptions of the different ethnic groups in the region, including their cultures, languages, and religious beliefs. Terry's description of these groups was notably less sensationalist than other European contemporaries. However, Terry presented Indian peoples in his account as simpler humans that, in his view, could not achieve higher status like Europeans unless they embraced Christianity. According to Terry, Indian peoples could still understand fundamental truths of the world through observation, but without Christian guidance and reasoning, they would be prone to illogical and irrational deductions of the natural world. Terry understood India as a region where God let Satan have more power than normal to act as a lesson for observant Christians.

Terry was one of the first writers to describe Indian-style vegetarianism to Early Modern England. Terry uses this as an example of Indian people's innate knowledge of good, but taken to an extreme due to lack of learned knowledge. Given that Terry only visited two regions of the Indian subcontinent, much of his commentary was probably based on other research.

Voyage was a popular work in England that was later translated into other languages, including Dutch and a French version that was published in 1663. It was included in the Travels of Pietro della Valle in a reduced, shorter format.

== Bibliography ==
- Richard Raiswell, “Edward Terry and the Calvinist Geography of India,” Études anglaises: Revue du monde anglophone 70.2 (2017): 167-186.
- Richard Raiswell, “‘Edward Terry and the Demons of India.” Knowing Demons, Knowing Spirits. Ed. Michelle Brock, David Winter and Richard Raiswell. Basingstoke, Hampshire: Palgrave Macmillan, 2018: 171-210.
- Edward Terry (1660). A Character of His most Sacred Majesty King Charles the IId. London.
- Edward Terry (1689). The Character of His Royal Highness, William Henry, Prince of Orange. London. (William Henry, Prince of Orange later reigned as William III of England)
- Edward Terry (1649). The Merchants and Mariners Preservation and Thanksgiving: Or, Thankfulnesse Returned, for Mercies. London.
- Edward Terry (1646). Pseudeleutheria. Or Lawlesse Liberty. London. (For the title word, see Eleutheria)
