= Prem Sanyas =

1925 film

Prem Sanyas (The Light of Asia)
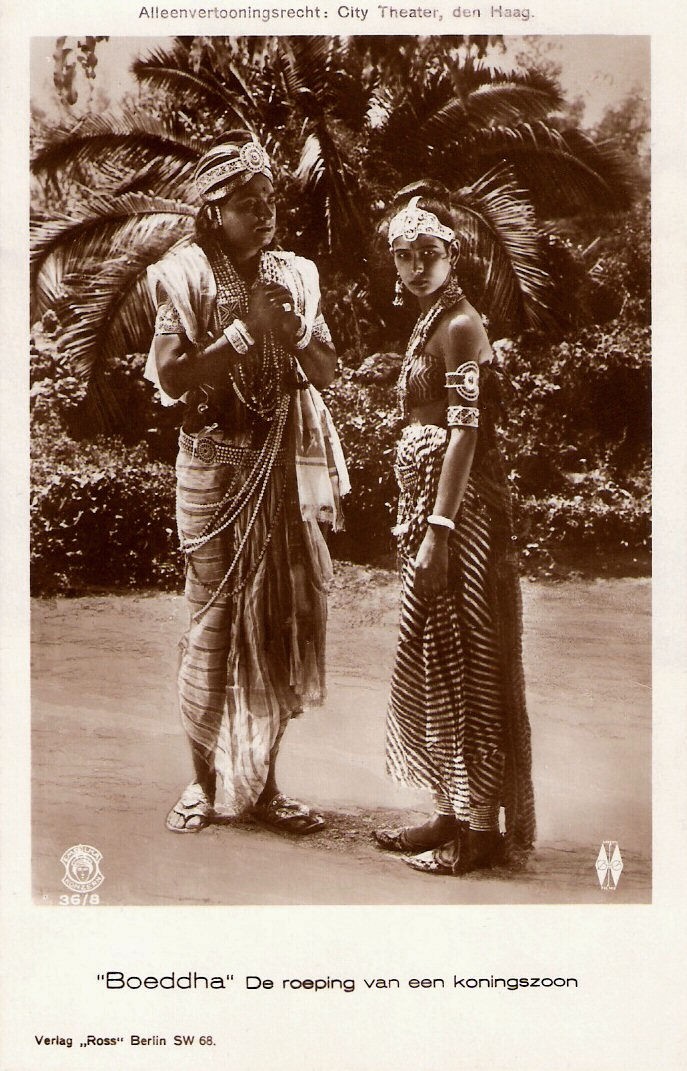
- Seeta Devi and Himanshu Rai in the film
- Directed by: Franz Osten; Himansu Rai
- Written by: Edwin Arnold (story); Niranjan Pal (screenplay)
- Produced by: Great Eastern Film Corporation; Münchner Lichtspielkunst AG
- Starring: Seeta Devi; Himansu Rai; Sarada Ukil
- Cinematography: Willi Kiermeier and Josef Wirsching.
- Music by: Hansheinrich Dransmann
- Distributed by: Münchner Lichtspielkunst AG; Great Eastern Film Corporation
- Release dates: 22 October 1925 (Germany); 5 July 2001 (restored version)
- Running time: 97 min
- Countries: Weimar Republic; India

The Light of Asia

Prem Sanyas (The Light of Asia) (Die Leuchte Asiens in German) is a 1925 silent film, directed by Franz Osten and Himansu Rai. It was adapted from the book, The Light of Asia (1879) in verse, by Edwin Arnold, based on the life of Prince Siddhartha Gautama, who founded Buddhism by becoming the Buddha or the "Enlightened one".

== Production ==
The film was an Indo-European co-production, with German technicians and Indian actors, and it managed to steer clear of the usual exotic depiction of Indian culture favoured by western filmmakers up until then. It was made with the cooperation of the Maharajah of Jaipur and contained a cast of thousands. Shooting took place in Lahore, in what is now Pakistan, where the set decoration was created by Devika Rani, the wife of actor/director Himanshu Rai and a noted actress herself. The film was released in the US by the Film Arts Guild on 11 May 1928.

== Synopsis ==
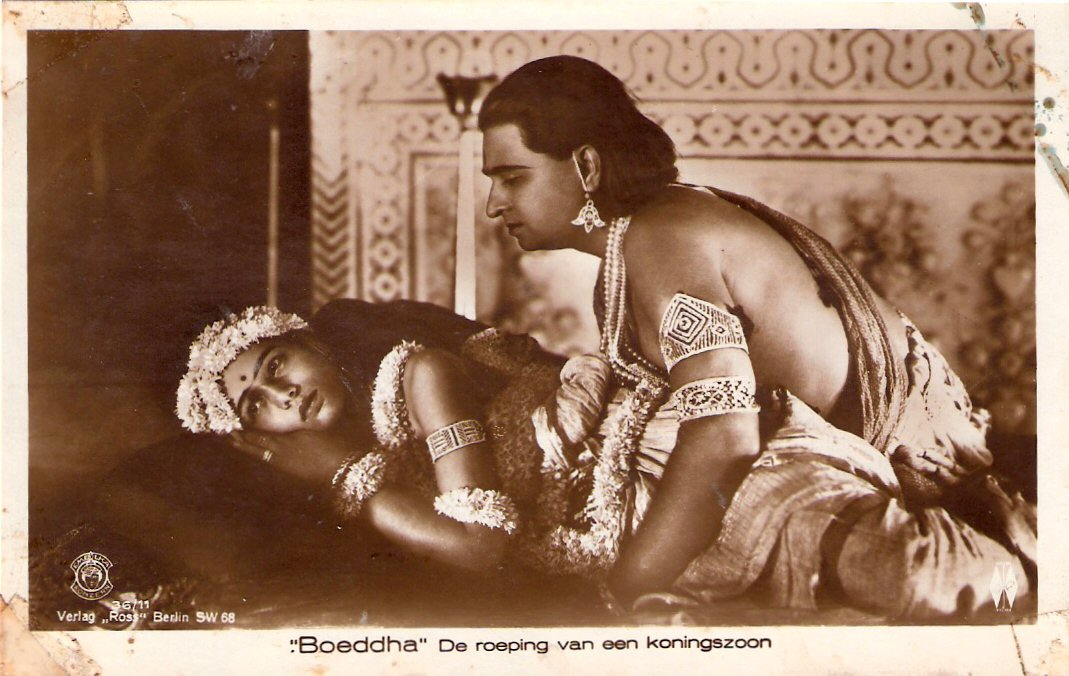
Seeta Devi and Himanshu Rai

A tale from India about the origin of the Buddha, Prem Sanyas depicts the story of Prince Siddhartha Gautama (portrayed by director Himansu Rai), the man who became the Buddha, as he journeys from privilege and seclusion to awareness of the inevitability of life's suffering, finally renouncing his kingdom to seek enlightenment.

== Restoration and release ==
The film was restored by Arte, and released in 2001.

== Cast ==
- Seeta Devi Gopa
- Himansu Rai: Gautama
- Sarada Ukil: King Suddhodhana
- Rani Bala: Queen Maya
- Profulla Roy

== See also ==
- Depictions of Gautama Buddha in film
- List of films made in Weimar Germany
