= Patience Cooper =

Indian actress (1905–1993)

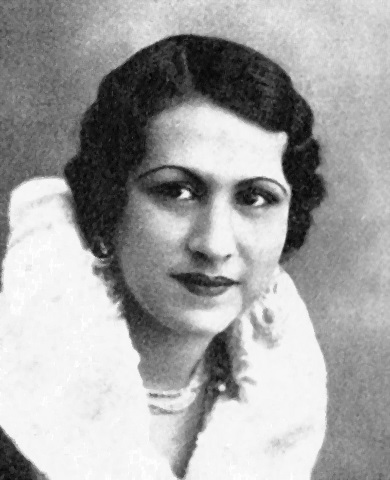
- Cooper in a publicity portrait in 1930
- Born: Patience Cooper; 30 May 1905; Howrah, Bengal Presidency, British India
- Died: 5 April 1993 (aged 87); Karachi, Pakistan
- Other names: The Siren of the Silent Era; The Dancing Star; The Silent Screen Star
- Occupation: Actress
- Years active: 1920–1947
- Spouses: M. A. Isapahani (m. 1926; div. 1928) Gul Hamid Khan (m. 1930; died 1936)
- Children: 17 (all adopted/ fostered)
- Parent(s): James Alfred Cooper (father); Phoebe Stella Gamble (mother)
- Relatives: John Frederick Gamble (grandfather); Phoebe Stella Clement (grandmother); Violet Cooper (sister); Pearl Cooper (sister)

Patience Cooper (30 May 1905 – 5 April 1993) was an Anglo-Indian actress, and one of the early superstars of Bollywood in British India. She was also known as The Siren of the Silent Era, The Dancing Star and The Silent Screen Star during the silent era of films in Indian Cinema. Along with Ermeline, Ruby Myers, Sabita Devi and Sita Devi, she is credited as a "leading star" of the 1920s, 1930s and 1940s who had more mass appeal than their male counterparts. She is stated to be one of the "prominent" leading ladies of the "pioneering era" of Indian cinema along with Mehtab, Bibbo, Durga Khote, Gohar, Devika Rani, Susan Solomon and Indira Devi.

== Early life ==
She was the daughter of Phoebe Stella Gamble (born in Calcutta in 1881; daughter of John Frederick Gamble and Phoebe Stella Clement whose mother was Armenian) and James Alfred Cooper. An Anglo-Indian born in Howrah, West Bengal, and baptised on 30 May 1905, Cooper had a successful career in both silent and sound films. She is credited with the first double roles of Indian cinema—as twin sisters in Patni Prataap and as mother and daughter in Kashmiri Sundari, even though earlier in 1917, actor Anna Salunke had played roles of both the male lead character Ram and the female lead character Seeta in the film Lanka Dahan. Patience's younger sisters Violet Cooper and Pearl Cooper were also actresses in both silent films and later talkie films.

== Stage career ==
Cooper began her career as a dancer in Bandmann's Musical Comedy, a Eurasian troupe. She later joined Jamshedji Framji Madan's Corinithian Stage Company as an actress.

She would travel to different countries for performance and musical stage plays. Patience went on trips to several countries such as Germany, Poland, Austria, Paris, Europe, Japan, China, London and United States. She also took part in a beauty contest in England which she won.

== Film career ==
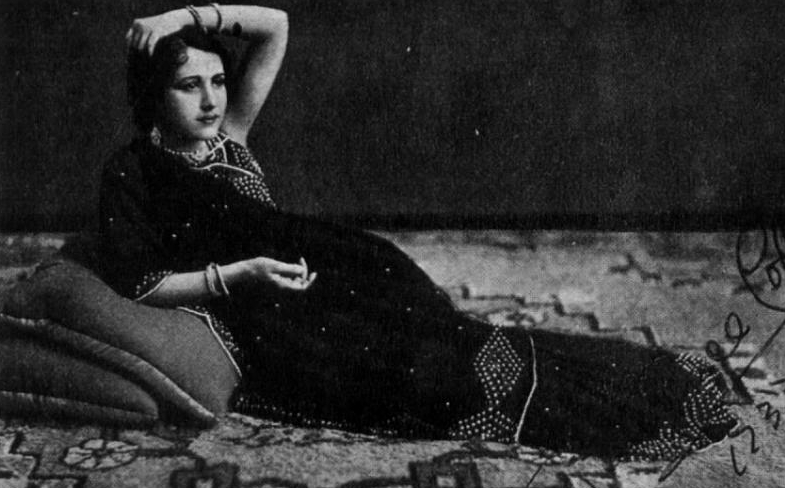
Patience Cooper in the 1920s.

Cooper first made an impact with Nala Damayanti (1920). The film starred Keki Adajania as Nala and Cooper as Damayanti. The film was a big budget Madan Theatre production and was directed by Eugenio de Liguoro, known in Italy for his Orientalist spectacles like Fascino d'Oro (1919). Nala Damayanti was famous for its special effects at the time — Narada's ascent of Mount Meru to heaven, the transformations of four gods into impersonations of Nala, the transformation of Kali into a serpent among others.

Her next film was Vishnu Avtar, released in 1921. De Liguoro also directed Dhruva Chartitra (1921), a mythological based on the legend of Dhruva whose quest for eternal knowledge and salvation was rewarded when he became the brightest star in the heavens, the pole star also known as Dhruvatara. The film was made as a bid for an international breakthrough for Madan Theatres and featured many Europeans in the cast along with Cooper who played the female lead, Suniti.

One of Cooper's biggest successes was Pati Bhakti (1922). Cooper played Leelavati in the film, directed by the great J. J. Madan himself, advocating that women should be devoted to their husband. The film is regarded as her greatest film and was also involved in a small controversy as in Madras, the censor demanded that a dance number be removed on the grounds of obscenity.

Cooper also played perhaps the first ever double roles in Hindi films — Patni Pratap (1923), where she played two sisters and Kashmiri Sundari (1924), where she played mother and daughter.

Cooper did films right through to the mid-1930s. One of her last major films was Zehari Saap (1933). The film was a typical Cooper vehicle about a medieval chieftain's revolt against the good Nawab Bakar Malik. The nawab's outlaw son vows revenge and finally all's well that ends well. The dramatic conflict in the film sees the chieftain wanting to marry the princess, whom he had raised as his own daughter.

Cooper acted in over 80 films until she retired in 1947, after performing in her last film, Khan Saheb. Cooper was often cast in the role of a sexually troubled but innocent woman, always at the centre of moral dilemmas, often caused by the men in her lives.

A major aspect of Cooper's star image was the successful achievement of the 'Hollywood look' in spite of different light and technical conditions. Her distinctively Anglo-Indian features, like dark eyes, sharp features, ebony hair and light skin tone, allowed technicians to experiment with the imported technique of eye-level lighting and achieve an appearance similar to Hollywood stars of the silent era.

The low number of women, especially Hindus, in the film industry during the 1920s (due to conservative attitudes) meant Anglo-Indian actresses like Cooper, were in demand. Her appearance in a string of successful films has led her to being called the first ever female Indian film star.

== Personal life ==
It is generally supposed Cooper married Mirza Abul Hassan Ispahani Saheb (MAH Ispahani), a well-known Indian businessman. In 1947, they migrated to Pakistan. Actually she was married to MAH Ispahani at the age of 21 and divorced soon after in 1928. She then married Gul Hamid Khan, one of the first early silent movie actors. He died six years later from Hodgkin's Disease.

== Later life ==
She remained friends with MAH Ispahani until the end of her life. Cooper changed her name to Sabra Begum and lived the last of her days with her two adopted daughters Zeenat and Haleema in Karachi, Pakistan. Her foster daughter Syeda Nafees Rizvi lives in Houston, Texas, USA. She fostered and/or adopted 17 children during her lifetime.

== Death ==
Cooper died at her home in Karachi in 1993.

== Filmography ==
=== Silent Movies ===
Year	Film	Director	Notes
1920	Nala Damayanti	Eugenio de Liguoro	
1921	Bishu Abatar	Jyotish Bandyopadhyay	
1921	Mohini		
1921	Vishunavtar		
1921	Mira Bai		
1921	Dhruba Charitra	Jyotish Bannerji	
1921	Nal Damayanti	Jyotish Bandyopadhyay	
1921	Dhruva Charitra	Eugenio De Liguoro	
1921	Behula	C. Legrand	
1921	Vishnu Avatar	C. Legrand	
1922	Sati		
1922	Ratnavali	Jyotish Bannerji	
1922	Tara the Dancer		
1922	Pati Bhakti	J. J. Madan	
1922	Kamale Kamini	Sisir Kumar Bhaduri	
1922	Ramayan	Jyotish Bandyopadhyay	Serial
1922	Kamalay Kamini		
1922	Gangavatran		
1922	Ramayan	Eugenio De Liguoro	Serial
1922	Nartaki Tara	Jyotish Bandyopadhyay	
1922	Ratnavali	C. Legrand	
1922	Raja Bhoj		
1922	Matri Snara		
1922	Mohini	Sisir Kumar Bhaduri	
1922	Bhagirathi Ganga		
1922	Rajkumari Budur	J. J. Madan	
1922	Laila Majnu	J. J. Madan	
1923	Matri Sneha	Jyotish Bannerji	
1923	Kamale Kamini		
1923	Noor Jehan	J. J. Madan	
1924	Patni Pratap	J. J. Madan	Serial
1924	Toorkey Hoor	J. J. Madan	
1924	Dhruva Charitra		
1925	Sati Lakshmi	Jyotish Bannerji	
1925	Adoorat Chheley	J. J. Madan	
1925	Sansar Chakra		
1925	Kashmiri Sundari		
1925	Pampered Youth		
1925	Sati Laxmi		
1925	Turki Hoor		
1926	Profulla	Jyotish Bannerji	
1926	Joydev	Jyotish Bannerji	
1926	Dharmapatni	Jyotish Bannerji	
1926	Jaidev		
1926	Krishnakanter Will (1926 film)		
1926	Durgesh Nandini		
1927	Jana	Priyanath Ganguly	
1927	Krishnakanter Will	Priyanath Ganguly	
1927	Durgesh Nandini (1927 film)	Priyanath Ganguly	
1927	Chandidas	Jyotish Bannerji	
1928	Aankh Ka Nasha		
1928	Vranti		
1928	Hoor-E-Arab	Ratansha Sinore	
1928	Bhranti	Jyotish Bannerji	
1929	Giribala	Modhu Bose	
1929	Kapal Kundala	Priyanath Ganguly	
1930	Bharat Ramani	Jyotish Bannerji	
1930	Rajsinha		
1930	Bharati Balak		
1930	Vaman Avatar		
1930	Rajsingha	Jyotish Bannerji	
1930	Kal Parinaya	Priyanath Ganguly	
1930	Ganesh Janma	Jal Ariah	

=== Talkie Movies ===
Year	Film	Director	Notes
1931	Bibaha Bibhrat	Jyotish Bannerji	
1931	Alladin And The Wonderful Lamp	Jal Ariah	
1931	Samaj Ka Shikar		
1931	Satyawadi Raja Harishchandra	J. J. Madan	
1931	Bharati Balak	Agha Hashar Kashmiri	
1932	Pati Bhakti		
1932	Chatra Bakavali	J. J. Madan	Fantasy
1932	Bilwamangal	Fram Madan	
1932	Ali Baba And The Forty Thieves	J. J. Madan	
1932	Educated Wife		
1932	Alibaba & Forty Thieves		
1932	Hathili Dulhan	J. J. Madan	
1933	Madhur Murali		
1933	Naqli Doctor	J. J. Madan	
1933	Dhruva	Jyotish Banerji	
1933	Zehari Saap	J. J. Madan	
1934	Kismet Ka Shikar		
1934	Bhakta-Ke-Bhagwan	V. M. Gunjal	
1934	Garib Ki Duniya	Sorabji Kerawala	
1934	Anokha Prem	F. R. Irani	
1934	Kanya Vikraya	Mohammad Hussain	
1934	Sakhi Lutera	Sorabji Kerawala	
1935	Dil Ki Pyaas	J. J. Madan	
1935	Asmat Ka Moti	Fram Sethna	
1935	Khudadad		
1935	Jawani Ka Nasha	F. R. Irani	
1935	Prem Ki Ragini		
1935	Sulagto Sansar	G. R. Sethi	
1935	Murderer		
1935	Mera Pyara	Ezra Mir	
1936	Noor-E-Wahadat	G. R. Sethi	
1936	Sita Haran		
1936	Mohabbat Ka Toofan	Fram Sethna	
1936	Baghi Sipahi	A.R. Kardar	
1936	Khyber Pass	Gul Hamid	
1937	Fakhr-E-Islam	Nanubhai Vakil	
1943	Rani	P. C. Barua	
1944	Chandar Kalanka	Pramathesh Chandra Barua	
1944	Iraada	S. Shamsuddin	
1946	Khan Saheb	Prem Sethna	
