= Behula (1921 film) =

1921 Indian silent film

- Directed by: Camille Legrand
- Produced by: J. F. Madan
- Starring: Patience Cooper
- Production company: Madan Theatres
- Release date: 1921
- Running time: Five reels
- Countries: India; France
- Language: Silent film

Behula is a 1921 Indian silent film directed by Camille Legrand and made at the Madan Theatres studios in Calcutta. Based on the Bengali Manasamangal legend, it starred the Anglo-Indian actress Patience Cooper in the title role. The negatives were taken to France, where the film survived in the collection of the Fondation Jérôme Seydoux-Pathé and was restored in 4K in 2022. It is the only surviving film from Patience Cooper's career.

== Plot ==
The film draws on the Manasamangal legend of the goddess Manasa. When the merchant Chand Sadagar refuses to worship her, Manasa condemns his son Lakhindar to die by snakebite on his wedding night. His bride, Behula, sets out along the Ganges with his body to bring him back to life.

== Production ==
Camille Legrand, a cameraman for Pathé, directed the five-reel film in 1921 in association with J. F. Madan, who represented Pathé in India through Madan Theatres. Patience Cooper, one of the studio's leading performers, played Behula.

== Rediscovery and restoration ==
Legrand had returned the negatives to France, where they remained in the collection of the Fondation Jérôme Seydoux-Pathé. The Fondation restored the film in 4K in 2022. The National Film Archive of India (NFAI) acquired a copy from the Fondation; its director, Prakash Magdum, had seen the camera negative at a retrospective in March 2019, and the film was digitised in France before being acquired during the COVID-19 pandemic. The negative carried no intertitles, and the NFAI began reconstructing them with the film historian Virchand Dharamsey. Magdum said that finding a complete silent film was "a near impossibility". It was the third Indian silent film the NFAI obtained from the French archive, after Bilwamangal (1919) and Madhabi Kankan (1930), and the first that survived in full.

The restored film was shown at Il Cinema Ritrovato in Bologna on 27 June 2022, with a new score by Keyvan Chemirani, and the Film Heritage Foundation screened it at the Regal Cinema in Mumbai on 5 December 2022.
