= Charu Roy =

Indian film director and actor

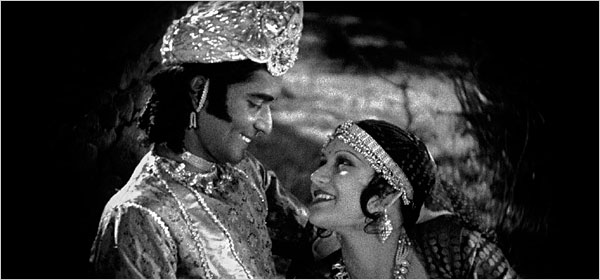
- Born: 6 September 1890; Berhampore, Bengal Presidency, British India
- Died: 28 September 1971; Calcutta, West Bengal, India
- Occupations: Film director, actor, painter
- Years active: (लगभग) 1920s–1930s (silent & early sound)
- Known for: Bangalee (1936), Shiraz (1928)

Charu Roy (6 September 1890 – 28 September 1971) was an Indian film director, actor, painter, and cultural figure active during the silent and early sound eras of Indian (especially Bengali) cinema.

Born in Berhampore (now in West Bengal), Roy studied geology and graduated from Presidency College, Calcutta. He was also a cartoonist, and writer, deeply involved in the Bengal School of Art.

== Career ==
Roy worked as an actor, director, costume designer, and art director. As actor, he acted in the silent film Shiraz (1928), playing Prince Khurram (later Emperor Shah Jahan).

As director, the many films he directed included Bigraha, Kuhu-o-Keka, Bangalee (1936), and Pathik (1939).

Beyond cinema, Roy was a painter trained in the Kalighat style and contributed to Bengali modern art. He was also a cartoonist for prominent Bengali publications.

== Personal life ==
He married Maya Roy in 1919, and they had at least one son, Mukul. Later in life, he continued his artistic work despite financial challenges, and passed away in Calcutta in 1971.

== Filmography ==
=== As director ===
- The Loves Of A Mughal Prince (1928)
- Bigraha (1930)
- Swami (1931)
- Chorekanta (1931)
- Rajnati Basantsena
- Diljani (1935)
- Daku Ka Ladka (1935)
- Kuhu-o-Keka (1936)
- Graher Pher (1936)
- Bangalee (1936)
- Pathik (1939)

=== As actor ===
- Shiraz film (1928)
- A Throw of Dice (1929)
- Loves of a Moghul Prince (1928)

== Legacy ==
Charu Roy is remembered as a pioneer in blending visual art with early Indian cinema. His film Bangalee is noted for its realist portrayal of middle-class Bengali life.
