= Andrew Topsfield =

Andrew S. Topsfield is Keeper of Eastern Art at the Ashmolean Museum, Oxford. He was educated at Winchester College and the universities of Oxford and London. In 1978 he joined the Indian section of the Victoria and Albert Museum as an assistant keeper and moved to the Ashmolean Museum as assistant keeper of eastern art in 1984.

== Selected publications ==
- Ed., Court painting in Rajasthan, Bombay, 2000.
- "Court painting at Udaipur: Art under the patronage of the Maharanas of Mewar", Artibus Asiae Supplementum XLIV, Zurich, 2002.
- Ed., with R. Crill and S. Stronge, Arts of Mughal India: Studies in honour of Robert Skelton, Ahmedabad and London, 2004.
- Ed., In the realm of gods and kings: Arts of India, London, 2004 (repr. 2014).
- Ed., The art of play: Board and card games of India, Bombay, 2006.
- 'Snakes and Ladders in India: Some further discoveries', Artibus Asiae, LXVI, 1, 2006, 143-79.
- Paintings from Mughal India, Oxford: Bodleian Library, 2008 (repr. 2013).
- ‘Sahibdin’, in M.C. Beach, B.N. Goswamy and E. Fischer eds., Masters of Indian painting, Zurich, 2011, vol. 1, 391-406.
- Visions of Mughal India: The collection of Howard Hodgkin, Oxford: Ashmolean Museum, 2012.
