= Edwin Arnold =

English poet and journalist (1832–1904)

Sir Edwin Arnold KCIE CSI
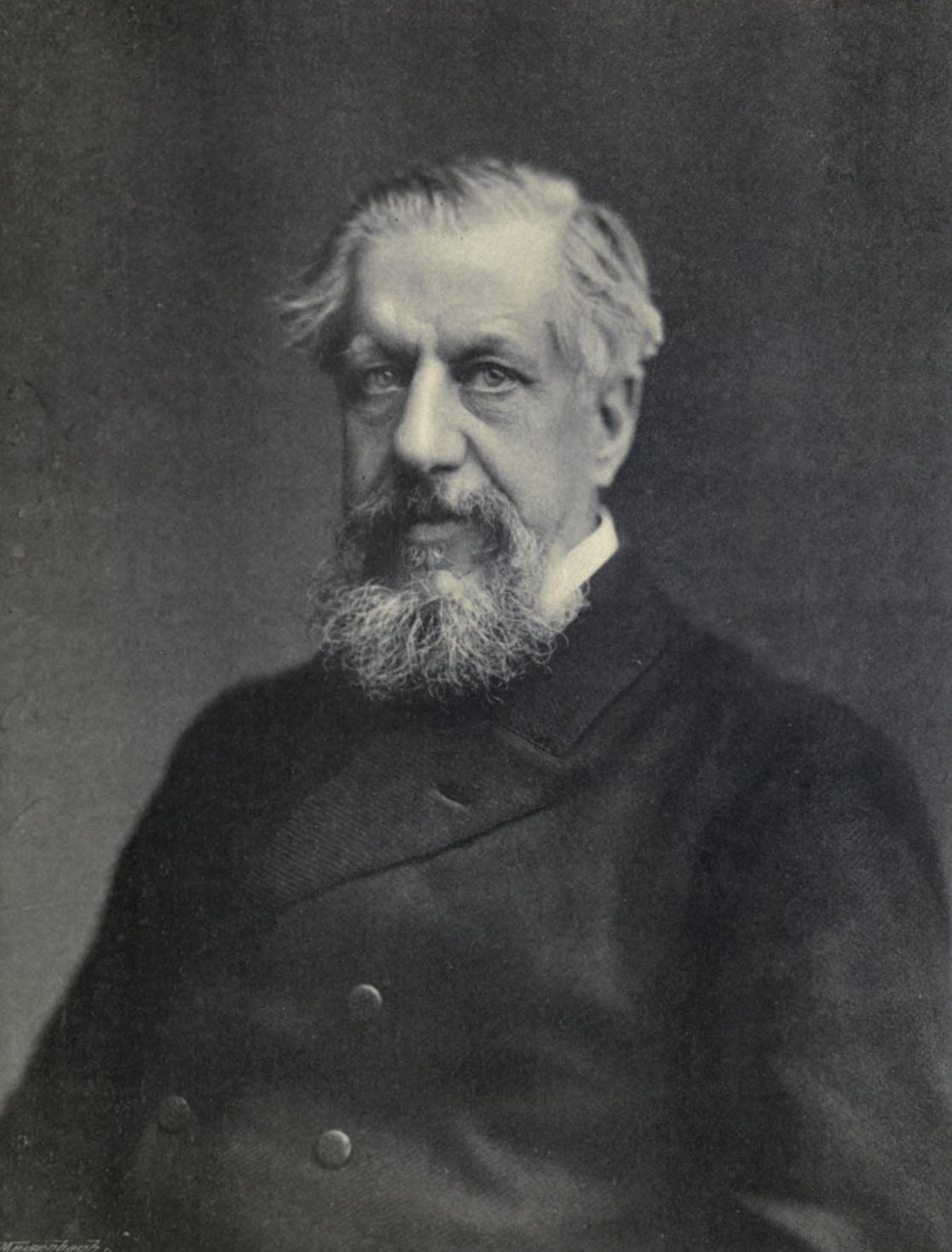
- Born: 10 June 1832; Gravesend, England
- Died: 24 March 1904 (aged 71); London, England
- Education: King's School, Rochester; King's College London; University College, Oxford
- Occupations: Journalist; editor; poet
- Children: 6, including Edwin Lester Arnold
- Writing career
- Notable work: The Light of Asia

Signature
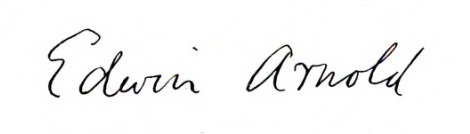

Sir Edwin Arnold (10 June 1832 – 24 March 1904) was an English poet and journalist. He is best known for his 1879 work, The Light of Asia.

Born in Gravesend, Kent, Arnold's early education at King's School, Rochester, and later at King's College London and University College, Oxford, laid the groundwork for his career. Initially a schoolmaster and later the Principal of the Deccan College in India, Arnold's experiences abroad influenced his literary endeavors. He became associated with The Daily Telegraph, serving as its editor-in-chief, and facilitated H. M. Stanley's exploration of Africa. Arnold's poem, The Light of Asia, an exploration of Buddhist philosophy through the life of Prince Gautama, earned him widespread acclaim. Despite the success of this work, his later attempts to emulate its triumph with The Light of the World centered on Jesus Christ, faced mixed reception. Arnold's personal life was marked by multiple marriages, including one to a Japanese woman, reflecting his deep engagement with Japanese culture as evidenced in his writings. An advocate for vegetarianism, he played a significant role in the West London Food Reform Society alongside figures like Mahatma Gandhi. Arnold died at the age of 77, in London, in 1904.

== Biography ==
Arnold was born at Gravesend, Kent, the second son of a Sussex magistrate, Robert Coles Arnold. He grew up at Southchurch Wick, a farm in Southchurch, Essex, and was educated at King's School, Rochester; King's College London; and University College, Oxford, where he won the Newdigate Prize for poetry on the subject of "The Feast of Belshazzar" in 1852. He became a schoolmaster, at King Edward's School, Birmingham, and in 1856 went to India as Principal of the Deccan College at Poona, a post which he held for seven years, which includes a period during the mutiny of 1857, when he was able to render services for which he was publicly thanked by Lord Elphinstone in the Bombay Council. Here he received the bias towards, and gathered material for, his future works.

Returning to England in 1861 he worked as a journalist on the staff of The Daily Telegraph, a newspaper with which he continued to be associated as editor for more than forty years, and of which he later became editor-in-chief. It was he who, on behalf of the proprietors of The Daily Telegraph in conjunction with the New York Herald, arranged the journey of H. M. Stanley to Africa to discover the course of the Congo River, and Stanley named after him a mountain to the north-east of Albert Edward Nyanza.

Arnold must also be credited with the first idea of a great trunk line traversing the entire African continent, for in 1874 he first employed the phrase "Cape to Cairo Railway" subsequently popularised by Cecil Rhodes.

It was, however, as a poet that he was best known to his contemporaries. The literary task which he set before him was the interpretation in English verse of the life and philosophy of the East. His chief work with this object is The Light of Asia, or The Great Renunciation, a poem of eight books in blank verse which was translated into various languages such as Hindi (tr. by Acharya Ram Chandra Shukla).

In it, in Arnold's own words, he attempted 'by the medium of an imaginary Buddhist votary to depict the life and character and indicate the philosophy of that noble hero and reformer, Prince Gautama of India, founder of Buddhism.' It appeared in 1879 and was an immediate success, going through numerous editions in England and America, though its permanent place in literature is quite uncertain. It is an Indian epic, dealing with the life and teaching of the Buddha. The poem was subjected to two lines of criticism: it was held by Oriental scholars to give a false impression of Buddhist doctrine; while, on the other, the suggested analogy between Sakyamuni and Jesus offended the taste of some devout Christians.

The latter criticism probably suggested to Arnold the idea of attempting a second narrative poem of which the central figure should be Jesus, the founder of Christianity, as the founder of Buddhism had been that of the first. But though The Light of the World (1891), in which this took shape, had considerable poetic merit, it lacked the novelty of theme and setting which had given the earlier poem much of its attractiveness; and it failed to repeat the success gained by The Light of Asia. Arnold's other principal volumes of poetry were Indian Song of Songs (1875), Pearls of the Faith (1883), The Song Celestial (1885), With Sa'di in the Garden (1888), Potiphar's Wife (1892), Adzuma, or The Japanese Wife (1893), and "Indian Poetry" (1904).

In "The Song Celestial" Sir Edwin produced a well-known poetic rendering of the sacred Hindu scripture Bhagavad Gita.

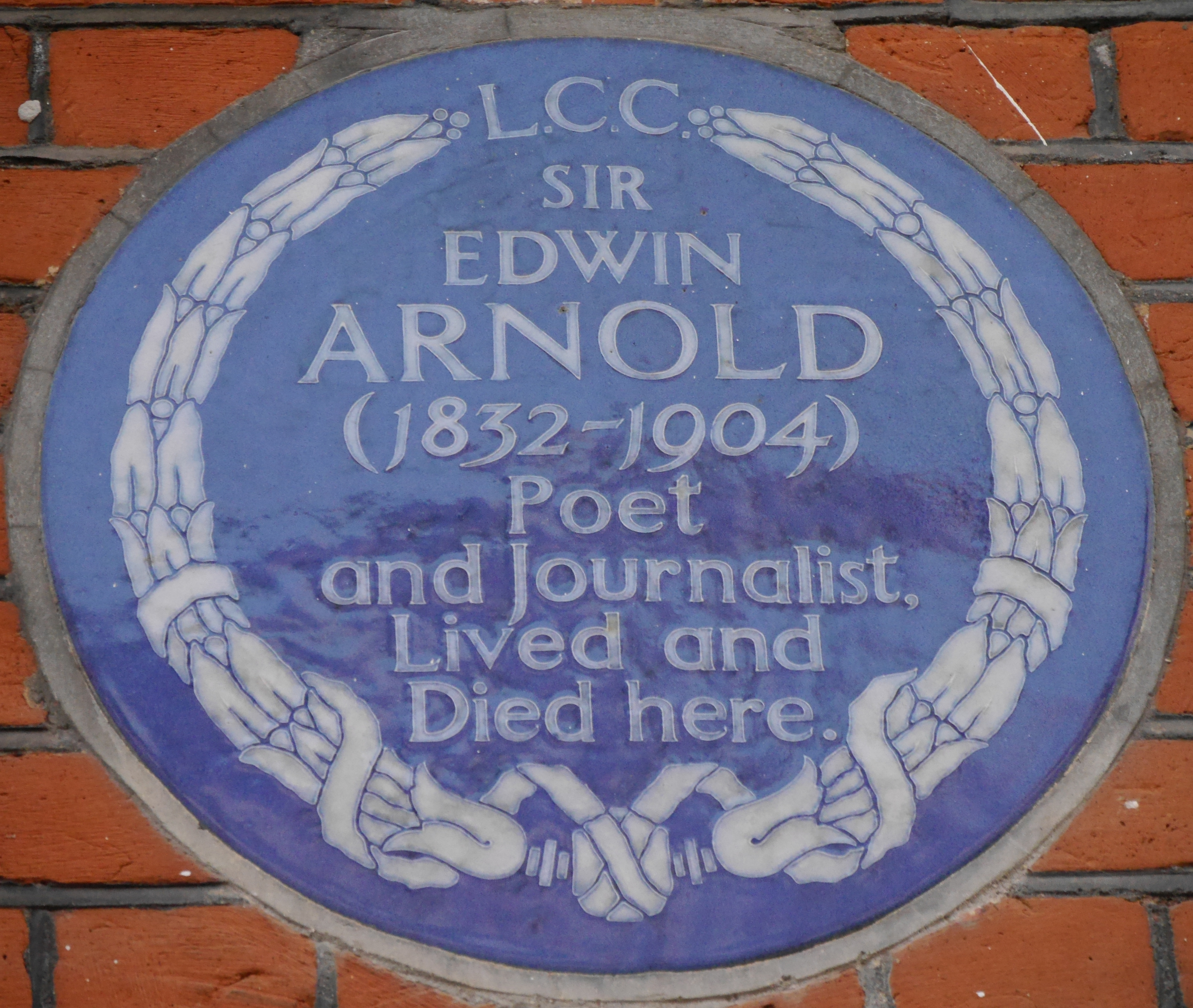
Blue plaque, 31 Bolton Gardens, Kensington, London

== Personal life ==
Sir Edwin was married three times. His first wife was Katherine Elizabeth Biddulph, of London, who died in 1864. Next he married Jennie Channing of Boston, who died in 1889. In his later years Arnold resided for some time in Japan, and his third wife, Tama Kurokawa, was Japanese. In Seas and Lands (1891) and Japonica (1891) he gives an interesting study of Japanese life. He was appointed CSI on the occasion of the proclamation of Queen Victoria as Empress of India in 1877, and was knighted in 1888 (as KCIE). He was also honoured with decorations by the rulers of Japan, Persia, Turkey and Siam. One of his six children was the novelist Edwin Lester Arnold, born in 1857.

He was a founder member, together with Anagarika Dharmapala, of the Mahabodhi Society of India and was a close associate of Weligama Sri Sumangala. A blue plaque unveiled in 1931 commemorates Arnold at 31 Bolton Gardens in South Kensington.

Arnold was a vegetarian. He was vice-president of the West London Food Reform Society, a vegetarian group based in Bayswater, founded in 1891, with Josiah Oldfield as president and Mahatma Gandhi as secretary. The Society was short-lived and dissolved as soon as Gandhi left Bayswater. He also served as vice-president of the London Vegetarian Society, after being invited by Gandhi.

Media offices
Preceded by Thornton Leigh Hunt	Editor of The Daily Telegraph; 1873–1888	Succeeded by John le Sage
