= List of Hindi film remakes of foreign films =

List of the official or unofficial hindi film remakes or based foreign films.

== 1960s ==
Year	Hindi Film	Original Film	Notes
1964	Door Gagan Ki Chhaon Mein	The Proud Rebel (1958)	
1968	Jhuk Gaya Aasman	Here Comes Mr. Jordan (1941)	
1969	Ittefaq	Signpost to Murder (1959)	

== 1970s ==
Year	Hindi Film	Original Film	Notes

== 1980s ==
Year	Hindi Film	Original Film	Notes
1986	Ek Ruka Hua Faisla	12 Angry Men (1957)	
1987	Jalwa	Beverly Hills Cop (1984)	
1989	Jurrat	The Untouchables (1987)	

== 1990s ==
Year	Hindi Film	Original Film	Notes
1990	Jurm	Someone to Watch Over Me (1987)	
1991	Dil Hai Ke Manta Nahin	It Happened One Night (1934)	
1992	Kaante	Reservoir dogs (1992)	
1992	Jo Jeeta Wohi Sikandar	Breaking Away (1979)	
1995	Akele Hum Akele Tum	Kramer vs. Kramer (1979)	
1996	Fareb	Unlawful Entry (1992)	
1996	Papi Gudia	Child's Play (1988)	
1998	Bade Miyan Chote Miyan	Bad Boys (1994)	
1998	Dushman	Eye for an Eye (1996)	
1998	Duplicate	The Whole Town's Talking (1935)	
1998	Humse Badhkar Kaun	Twins (1988)	

== 2000s ==
Year	Hindi Film	Original Film	Notes
2000	Dhaai Akshar Prem Ke	A Walk in the Clouds (1995)	
2000	Bichhoo	Léon: The Professional (1994)	
2000	Baaghi	A Bronx Tale (1993)	
2000	Khauff	The Juror (1996)	
2001	Kyo Kii... Main Jhuth Nahin Bolta	Liar Liar (1997)	
2002	Deewangee	Primal Fear (1996)	
2002	Awara Paagal Deewana	The Whole Nine Yards (2000)	
2003	Kucch To Hai	I Know What You Did Last Summer (1997)	
2003	Hawa	The Entity (1982)	
2004	Hum Kaun Hai?	The Others (2001)	
2004	Murder	Unfaithful (2002)	
2004	Ab...Bas!	Enough (2002)	
2004	Dil Ne Jise Apna Kahaa	Return to Me (2000)	
2004	Hawas	Unfaithful (2002)	
2005	Ek Ajnabee	Man on Fire (2004)	
2005	Chocolate	The Usual Suspects (1995)	
2005	Blackmail	Ransom (1996)	
2005	Deewane Huye Paagal	There's Something About Mary (1998)	
2006	36 China Town	Once Upon a Crime (1992)	
2006	Zinda	Oldboy (2003)	
2006	Anthony Kaun Hai?	Who Is Cletis Tout? (2002)	
2006	Deadline: Sirf 24 Ghante	Trapped (2002)	
2006	Fight Club: Members Only	Fight Club (1999)	
2006	Holiday	Dirty Dancing (1987)	
2007	Bheja Fry	Le Dîner de Cons (1998)	
2007	Partner	Hitch (2005)	
2007	Salaam-e-Ishq	Love Actually (2003)	
2007	Awarapan	A Bittersweet Life (2005)	
2007	Good Boy Bad Boy	Class Act (1992)	
2007	Dhamaal	It's a Mad, Mad, Mad, Mad World (1963)	
2008	God Tussi Great Ho	Bruce Almighty (2003)	
2008	De Taali	Saving Silverman (2001)	
2009	Fox	A Murder of Crows (1998)	
2009	Jai Veeru	Bulletproof (1996)	
2009	Acid Factory	Unknown (2006)	

== 2010s ==
Year	Hindi Film	Original Film	Notes
2010	We Are Family	Stepmom (1998)	
2010	Hum Tum Aur Ghost	Ghost Town (2008)	
2010	Hello Darling	9 to 5 (1980)	
2010	Click	Shutter (2004)	
2011	F.A.L.T.U	Accepted (2006)	
2011	Utt Pataang	A Stranger of Mine (2005)	
2013	Jayantabhai Ki Luv Story	My Dear Desperado (2010)	
2013	Hum Hai Raahi Car Ke	Harold & Kumar Go to White Castle (2004)	
2014	Ek Villain	I Saw the Devil (2010)	
2015	Jazbaa	Seven Days (2007)	
2015	Brothers	Warrior (2011)	
2016	Do Lafzon Ki Kahani	Always (2011)	
2016	Rocky Handsome	The Man from Nowhere (2010)	
2016	Te3n	Montage (2013)	
2017	Dobaara: See Your Evil	Oculus (2013)	
2019	Bharat	Ode to My Father (2014)	

== 2020s ==
Year	Hindi Film	Original Film	Notes
2020	Yaara	A Gang Story (2011)	
2021	Dhamaka	The Terror Live (2013)	
2022	Looop Lapeta	Run Lola Run (1998)	
2022	Laal Singh Chaddha	Forrest Gump (1994)	
2023	Bloody Daddy	Sleepless Night (2011)	
2024	Khel Khel Mein	Perfect Strangers (2016)	
2025	Sitaare Zameen Par	Champions (2018)	
2026	Tu Yaa Main	The Pool (2018)	
2026	King	Léon: The Professional (1994)	
2026	Ek Din	One Day (2016)	
