= Aankhon Ki Gustaakhiyan =

2025 Indian film by Santosh Singh

- Theatrical release poster
- Directed by: Santosh Singh
- Written by: Mansi Bagla
- Based on: The Eyes Have It by Ruskin Bond
- Produced by: Mansi Bagla; Varun Bagla
- Starring: Vikrant Massey; Shanaya Kapoor
- Cinematography: Tanveer Mir
- Edited by: Unnikrishnan P.P.
- Music by: Songs: Vishal Mishra; Score: Joel Joe Crasto
- Production companies: Zee Studios; Mini Films; Open Window Films
- Distributed by: Zee Studios
- Release date: 11 July 2025
- Running time: 138 minutes
- Country: India
- Language: Hindi
- Box office: est. ₹2.35 crore

Aankhon Ki Gustaakhiyan (lit. transl. Eyes' Impudence) is a 2025 Indian Hindi-language romantic drama film written by Mansi Bagla and directed by Santosh Singh. It is produced by Mansi Bagla and Varun Bagla under Zee Studios and Mini Films. Adapted from Ruskin Bond's short story The Eyes Have It, the film stars Vikrant Massey as a visually impaired musician and marks the acting debut of Shanaya Kapoor as a theater artist. Principal photography concluded in early 2025 after filming in Mussoorie, Mumbai and Europe and the film was released on 11 July 2025 in theatres.

== Plot ==
A visually impaired musician and a theater artist meet during a train journey through the Himalayas. As they converse without revealing their visual impairments, they form an emotional bond through voice and touch. The story explores their evolving relationship and personal transformations as they navigate societal perceptions, with their connection deepening despite physical limitations.

== Cast ==
- Vikrant Massey as Jahaan Bakshi, a visually impaired musician
- Shanaya Kapoor as Saba Shergill, a theater artist
- Zain Khan Durrani as Abhinav Grover
- Saanand Verma as Saukhilal
- Rajesh Jais as Saba's father
- Vikram Kochhar as Prashant
- Bharti Sharma as Noor
- Rehmatt Rattan as Tanya
- Shubham Joshi as Receptionist

== Production ==
=== Development ===
Producer Mansi Bagla conceived the project as an adaptation of Ruskin Bond's short story, with Vikrant Massey attached after his performance in 12th Fail (2023). The film's ₹35 crore budget was financed through significant personal sacrifices by the producers, including selling jewelry and property.

Shanaya Kapoor was cast after an extensive audition process where initial choices Tara Sutaria and Pratibha Ranta faced scheduling conflicts. Kapoor underwent four months of workshops and trained with an acting coach to prepare for her role, including performing scenes blindfolded.

=== Filming ===
Principal photography took place in Mussoorie (honoring Bond's original Himalayan setting), Mumbai and Europe between late 2024 and early 2025. Cinematographer Tanveer Mir employed close-focus techniques to translate sensory experiences visually, while Kapoor performed key scenes blindfolded to authentically portray blindness. Vikrant Massey researched with visually impaired individuals to prepare for his role.

== Soundtrack ==
Aankhon Ki Gustaakhiyan

Soundtrack album by Vishal Mishra
- Released: 17 July 2025
- Genre: Feature film soundtrack
- Length: 21:44
- Language: Hindi
- Label: Zee Music Company
External audio
- Aankhon Ki Gustaakhiyan - Full Album on YouTube

The music was composed by Vishal Mishra with lyrics by Mishra and Kaushal Kishore. The first single "Nazara" released on 11 June 2025, followed by the title track "Aankhon Ki Gustaakhiyan" performed by Jubin Nautiyal on 21 June. The final single "Alvida" released on 5 July. The soundtrack emphasizes tactile and auditory experiences to align with the film's themes.

Track listing
No.	Title	Lyrics	Singer(s)	Length
1.	"Alvida"	Vishal Mishra	Vishal Mishra	4:18
2.	"Nazara"	Vishal Mishra	Vishal Mishra	4:11
3.	"Aankhon Ki Gustaakhiyan" (Title Track)	Vishal Mishra, Kaushal Kishore	Jubin Nautiyal	3:54
4.	"Yuhi Safar"	Vishal Mishra	Jubin Nautiyal	3:42
5.	"Kya Karun"	Vishal Mishra	Vishal Mishra	3:38
6.	"Alvida" (Asees Version)	Vishal Mishra	Asees Kaur	2:01
Total length:				21:44

== Release ==
The film was announced on 30 April 2025 with a motion poster confirming its 11 July release date. The film premiered at a special industry screening attended by Sanjay Kapoor and other celebrities.

== Reception ==
=== Box office ===
The film concluded its run with a worldwide gross estimated to be ₹2.35 crore.

=== Critical response ===
The film received mostly negative reviews. On the review aggregator website Rotten Tomatoes, 27% of 11 critics' reviews are positive, with an average rating of 4.7/10.

Rishabh Suri of Hindustan Times rated it 2/5 and called it a half-baked love story that fails to sustain its promising premise, and while praising it for its pleasant music and scenic locations, he criticized the movie for its lack of depth, emotional resonance, and dramatic tension, with Vikrant Massey's portrayal of a visually-challenged singer being described as decent but underwhelming. Anurag Singh Bohra of India Today rated it 2.5/5 and criticized the film's clichéd storytelling, predictable plot, and lack of emotional depth. Shilajit Mitra of The Hindu criticized its over-reliance on sight-related metaphors, melodramatic second half, and stretched narrative while he also noted that the film's modest charm was weighed down by clichéd writing, heavy-handed symbolism, and lack of emotional subtlety, making it fall short of its potential.
