= Junaid Khan (Indian actor) =

Indian actor (born 1993)

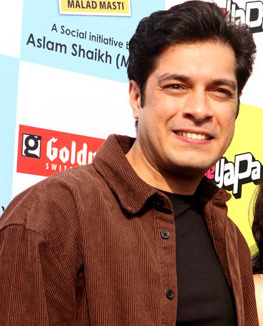
- Khan in 2025
- Pronunciation: [d͡ʒʊnɛːd̪ xɑːn]
- Born: 2 June 1993 (age 33); Bombay, Maharashtra, India
- Education: H.R. College of Commerce and Economics; American Academy of Dramatic Arts
- Occupation: Actor
- Years active: 2024–present
- Father: Aamir Khan
- Relatives: Khan–Hussain family

Junaid Khan (Hindustani pronunciation: [d͡ʒʊnɛːd̪ xɑːn]; born 2 June 1993) is an Indian actor known for his work on stage as well as in Hindi films. The son of actor Aamir Khan, he began his career in various theatre productions and made his lead debut playing Karsandas Mulji in the period drama film Maharaj (2024) on Netflix. He made his theatrical debut with the romantic comedy Loveyapa (2025) and has since starred in the romantic drama Ek Din (2026), both of which failed to propel his career forward.

== Early life and education ==
Junaid Khan was born to the Hindi film actor, Aamir Khan, and his first wife, Reena Dutta, in 1993. He has a younger sister, Ira. He has Pashtun-Arab ancestry from his paternal side, and Bengali ancestry from the maternal side.

He studied at the H.R. College of Commerce and Economics in Mumbai and at the American Academy of Dramatic Arts in New York.

== Career ==
=== Theatre ===
Khan began his acting career on stage, with a role in Quasar Thakore-Padamsee’s adaptation of Bertolt Brecht’s play Mother Courage and Her Children in 2017. He then played the lead role of a slave in his sister, Ira's theatre production of Medea, at the Prithvi Theatre in 2019.

In 2024, Khan starred in Faezeh Jalali's tragicomedy play Runaway Brides, as part of the Prithvi Theatre Festival. Also at the theatre, he played multiple roles in Shikhandi, based on the character of the same name. In the same year, he played a trans woman in Jalali's play Strictly Unconventional at the National Centre for the Performing Arts. Reviewing the play, Deepa Gahlot found Khan "totally relaxed in his flamboyant outfit and wig".

=== Films ===
Khan made his lead acting debut with the leading role of social reformer Karsandas Mulji in the period drama film Maharaj. It is based on the Maharaj Libel Case of 1862, about a priest who sexually assaulted women. Khan prepared for a year to play Mulji, relying on information he found in the public domain, losing around 25 kg of body weight, and learning the dialect in which Mulji spoke. The film was released on Netflix in 2024, following delays due to legal disputes. Shilajit Mitra of The Hindu reviewed that Khan is "sincere and sharp-featured as the striving Karsandas [...] though still miles away from emerging a captivating leading man: he is especially dull in the courtroom scenes".

In 2025, Khan had his first theatrical release opposite Khushi Kapoor in the romantic comedy Loveyapa, a remake of the Tamil film Love Today (2022). It tells the story of an engaged couple who switch phones before their marriage; Khan admitted to feeling miscast in the role as he found his character’s personality vastly different from his own. Titas Chowdhury of News18 took note of Khan's comic timing, which he did not have an opportunity to display in Maharaj. Conversely, Rediff.com's Sukanya Verma dismissed his "acting method [as] akin to someone wringing out water from a towel" and criticised his chemistry with Kapoor. It emerged as a box-office bomb. The following year, Khan starred opposite Sai Pallavi in the Sapporo-set romance Ek Din (2026), produced by his father. In a mixed review of the film for the Indian edition of The Hollywood Reporter, Rahul Desai criticised the actor's portrayal of his introverted character "as if it’s a medical condition", and felt that he had been overshadowed by Pallavi, who he remarked is "acting for two". It was, again, a box-office failure for Khan.

== Filmography ==
Key
†	Denotes films that have not yet been released

=== Films ===
Year	Title	Role	Notes	Refs.
2014	PK	Assistant director	Debut as assistant director	
2024	Maharaj	Karsandas Mulji		
2025	Loveyapa	Gaurav "Gucci" Sachdeva		
2026	Ek Din	Dinesh "Dino" Shrivastava		
TBA	Ragini 3 †	TBA	Filming	

=== Theatre ===
- Mother Courage and Her Children (2017)
- Medea (2019)
- Runaway Brides (2024)
- Shikhandi (2024)
- Strictly Unconventional (2024)

== Awards and nominations ==
Year	Award	Category	Film	Result	Ref.
2024	Indian Television Academy Awards	Best Actor in an Original Film – OTT	Maharaj	Nominated	
2024	Bollywood Hungama OTT India Fest	Bright New Star of the Year	Maharaj	Nominated	
