= Khushi Kapoor =

Indian actress (born 2000)

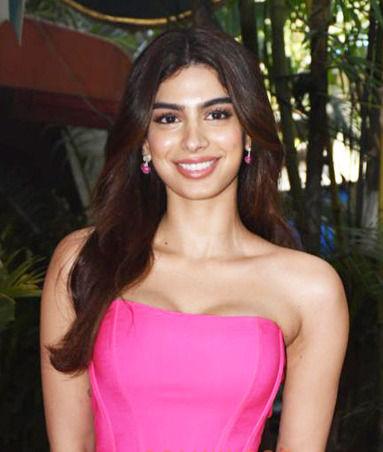
- Kapoor in 2023
- Born: 5 November 2000 (age 26); Mumbai, Maharashtra, India
- Education: New York Film Academy
- Occupation: Actress
- Years active: 2023–present
- Parents: Boney Kapoor (father); Sridevi Kapoor (mother)
- Relatives: Surinder Kapoor family

Khushi Kapoor (born 5 November 2000) is an Indian actress who works in Hindi films. Born to actress Sridevi and producer Boney Kapoor, she made her feature film debut with the role of Betty Cooper in The Archies (2023). She has since starred in the poorly-received romantic comedies Loveyapa and Nadaaniyan (both 2025).

== Early life and background ==
Kapoor was born on 5 November 2000. Born to actress Sridevi and film producer Boney Kapoor. She is the granddaughter of Surinder Kapoor and the niece of film actors Anil Kapoor and Sanjay Kapoor. She has one sister, Janhvi, who is also an actress and two half siblings, actor Arjun and Anshula Kapoor, from her father's first marriage to producer Mona Shourie. Her cousins include actors and producers Sonam Kapoor, Rhea Kapoor, Harshvardhan Kapoor, Shanaya Kapoor and Mohit Marwah. Kapoor lost her mother at age 17, when Sridevi was found dead of an accidental drowning in Dubai.

Kapoor did her schooling at Mumbai's École Mondiale World School. She later did a year acting course at the New York Film Academy in New York City, in 2019.

== Career ==
Kapoor made her student acting debut in the student short film Speak Up, playing Naina in NYFA. In 2023, she made her Hindi film debut with The Archies, portraying Betty Cooper. It was released on Netflix in December 2023. Sukanya Verma of Rediff.com stated that she "appears cute in her sunshine smiles and groomed-in glow but need[s] to loosen up and give that extra something to the camera."

Kapoor in 2025

In 2025, Kapoor starred in two romantic comedies, Loveyapa with Junaid Khan and Nadaaniyan opposite debutant Ibrahim Ali Khan. A remake of the Tamil film Love Today (2022), Loveyapa marked Kapoor's first theatrical release. Although it was released first, the film was shot after Nadaaniyan, and Kapoor stated that she felt significantly more confident in her abilities than she had while working on her first project. Reviews of her performance were mixed. Vineeta Kumar of India Today wrote that, following a poor debut, Kapoor "continues to disappoint" and criticised her Hindi diction. Conversely, News18's Titas Chowdhury noted an improvement from The Archies and thought that she "impresses particularly in the emotionally heavier scenes". The film emerged as a box-office bomb. Kapoor's next release, Dharmatic Entertainment's romantic comedy Nadaaniyan for Netflix, was panned by critics. In a scathing review for Firstpost, Lachmi Deb Roy wrote that Kapoor's "expressionless face and frozen smile" once again failed to make an impact. Reviewers for India Today and WION similarly criticised the chemistry between Kapoor and Khan.

== Media image ==
In addition to acting, Kapoor is a brand ambassador for brands and products such as Sol de Janeiro and Myntra. In 2023, she featured on the cover of Cosmopolitan India.

Kapoor has said that her self-esteem suffered due to negative comments made on her appearance when she was a child. She has been vocal about undergoing cosmetic surgeries, including a nose job and eyebrow nanoblading.

== Filmography ==
=== Films ===
Year	Title	Role	Notes	Ref.
2020	Speak Up	Naina	Short film	
2023	The Archies	Betty Cooper		
2025	Loveyapa	Baani Sharma		
2025	Nadaaniyan	Pia Jaisingh		

=== Television ===
Year	Title	Role	Notes	Ref.
2024	Fabulous Lives of Bollywood Wives	Herself	Guest appearance	
