= Maharaj (film) =

2024 Indian film by Siddharth P. Malhotra

- Official release poster
- Directed by: Siddharth P. Malhotra
- Written by: Vipul Mehta; Sneha Desai
- Produced by: Aditya Chopra
- Starring: Junaid Khan; Jaideep Ahlawat; Shalini Pandey; Sharvari
- Cinematography: Rajeev Ravi
- Edited by: Shweta Venkat Mathew
- Music by: Songs: Sohail Sen; Alap Desai; Score: Sanchit Balhara and Ankit Balhara
- Production company: YRF Entertainment
- Distributed by: Netflix
- Release date: 21 June 2024
- Running time: 131 minutes
- Country: India
- Language: Hindi

Maharaj is a 2024 Indian Hindi-language historical drama film directed by Siddharth P. Malhotra and produced by YRF Entertainment. It stars Junaid Khan in his lead film debut with Jaideep Ahlawat, Shalini Pandey and Sharvari. The film is based on the Maharaj Libel Case of 1862 and Saurabh Shah's novel about the case.

Initially scheduled to release on 14 June 2024, the Gujarat High Court stayed the release of the film, based on a Hindu group's plea that claimed the film could incite violence against followers of Pushtimarga Sampradaya (a Vaishnava Krishna sect). It was finally released on 21 June 2024 for streaming on Netflix.

== Plot ==
In pre-independent Bombay, Karsan and his fiancée, Kishori, are members of the haveli led by Maharaj "JJ". When Kishori is chosen to perform charan seva, a supposed "ritual" that is just JJ indulging in sexual acts with girls, Karsan is upset, though Kishori feels that she did nothing wrong. Karsan breaks off their engagement, and is exiled by his family. When she sees JJ preying on her younger sister Devi, Kishori realizes the error of JJ's beliefs, but feels she has lost Karsan forever. Before Karsan can tell her that he's going to give her a second chance, Kishori takes her own life. Devi gives Kishori's final message to Karsan, asking him to expose JJ's evil to the world.

Karsan sets out to expose JJ's actions, but encounters several obstacles from JJ and his followers. However, he gains the support of Viraaj, who helps him gain followers and publish JJ's wrongdoings in his own newspaper that begins to change followers' opinions. Livid, JJ threatens Karsan's father to make him stop publishing, but Karsan refuses to give up. Eventually, JJ files a defamation suit against Karsan. Despite the little support he gets, Viraaj encourages Karsan to push forward for women like herself, who were forced to perform charan seva and did not have a voice to speak up.

Despite JJ discrediting Karsan's witnesses, Karsan takes the stand and brings light to JJ's misinterpretations of scripture, and his exploitation of women and girls. As he speaks of the importance of not needing a bridge like JJ in order to reach god, haveli followers in the courtroom take Karsan's side and testify against JJ, proving that claims Karsan published are true. Karsan is acquitted of the charges of defamation. JJ loses his followers, while Karsan is applauded by the people.

== Cast ==
- Junaid Khan as Karsandas Mulji, a progressive thinker and statesman
- Jaideep Ahlawat as Maharaj Jadunath Brijratan "JJ"
- Shalini Pandey as Kishori, Mulji's ex-fiancee
- Sharvari as Viraaj, Mulji's employee and comrade
- Viraf Patel as Sorabji, Mulji's friend and confidant
- Sunil Gupta as Dadabhai Naoroji
- Vaibhav Tatwawadi as Dr. Bhau Daji Lad
- Meher Vij as Vahuji, JJ's wife
- Jay Upadhyay as Giridhar Khawas, JJ's right hand man
- Ananya Agarwal as Devi, Kishori's sister
- Priyal Gor as Leelavati
- Sandeep Mehta as Mulji, Karsan's father
- Sneha Desai as Bhabhu, Karsan's aunt
- Sanjeev Seth as Karsan's maternal uncle
- Jaya Ojha as Karsan's maternal aunt
- Utkarsh Mazumdar as Lalvanji Maharaj
- Jamie Alter as Defense Attorney Arnesty
- Mark Bennington as Prosecutor Bailey
- Edward Sonnenblick as Justice Matthew Richard Sausse
- Sanjay Goradia as Nanubhai
- Sharad Kelkar as Narrator
- Kamlesh Oza as Shaamji, Leelavati's brother
- Hemant Choudhary as Shraddhalu

== Production ==
The film began pre-production in November 2020 and went on floors in February 2021. Suffering shooting halts, the production wrapped up in October 2023.

== Soundtrack ==
Maharaj

Soundtrack album by Sohail Sen, Alap Desai, Sanchit Balhara and Ankit Balhara
- Released: 24 June 2024
- Recorded: 2022–23
- Genre: Feature film soundtrack
- Length: 21:00
- Language: Hindi
- Label: YRF Music
- Producer: Aditya Chopra

The film's music was composed by Sohail Sen, Alap Desai and Sanchit Balhara and Ankit Balhara while the lyrics were written by Kausar Munir and Sneha Desai.

Track Listing
No.	Title	Lyrics	Music	Singer(s)	Length
1.	"Achutam Keshavam"	Traditional	Sohail Sen	Sonu Nigam, Osman Mir	4:35
2.	"Holi Ke Rang Ma"	Kausar Munir	Sohail Sen	Shreya Ghoshal, Shaan, Osman Mir, Sohail Sen	5:07
3.	"Haan Ke Haan"	Kausar Munir	Sohail Sen	Monali Thakur	4:01
4.	"Gurujan"	Sneha Desai	Alap Desai	Sangeeta Labadiya	1:50
5.	"The Love Ballad Theme"		Sanchit Balhara-Ankit Balhara		2:47
6.	"Viraj's Theme"		Sanchit Balhara-Ankit Balhara		1:30
7.	"The Face-off Theme: Karsan VS Maharaj"		Sanchit Balhara-Ankit Balhara		2:30
Total length:					21:00

== Reception ==
On the review aggregator website Rotten Tomatoes, 29% of 14 critics' reviews are positive, with an average rating of 4.9/10.

A critic for Bollywood Hungama rated the film 3.5 stars out of 5 and wrote "Maharaj makes an important comment. The protests and legal issues will further increase its viewership." Saibal Chatterjee of NDTV rated this film 2 stars out of 5 and said, "For all the elements that work in Maharaj, there is a whole bunch of others that don't. A period drama that has so much to say has never felt so inert and ineffectual". Shubhra Gupta of The Indian Express also gave 2 stars out 5 and stated, "The only one who is completely in sync with the film’s tonality is Jaideep Ahlawat, who has given us a 'dharm ka thekedar' to beat all 'dharm ke thekedars'." Sukanya Verma of Rediff.com rated this film 2 stars out of 5 and observes that "Maharaj's mediocre social drama lacks the spine and spunk to recreate the relevance of revolutionary decisions in the face of religious fanaticism".

Sana Farzeen of India Today gave 3.5 stars out of 5 and wrote, "Junaid Khan, as a first-timer, looks confident and at ease on screen. 'Maharaj' is an unconventional and brave debut choice, and Khan captures your attention. As expected, Jaideep Ahlawat once again gives a flawless performance. He is as effortless as JJ". Monika Rawal Kukreja of Hindustan Times said, "Though Maharaj is set in the pre-independence era, the story and the fight against 'bhakt culture' holds relevance in today's times". Renuka Vyavahare The Times of India rated 2.5 stars out of 5 and stated "Based on a true story, unlike the impression given, the film isn’t a courtroom thriller. It’s a historical drama retelling the events that led to the court case fought in the British court of Bombay".

Shilajit Mitra of The Hindu observes that "If not for the touchiness of our times, a film as simple, sedate and self-congratulatory like 'Maharaj' would likely slip under the radar". Nandini Ramnath writes for Scroll.in, "The film is barely convincing as a period production. The makers are equally unable to depict the sensitivity of religious feeling or the monumentality of Karsan’s decision to take on a powerful sect. It’s hard to critique cultish behaviour when there’s no curiosity behind the sentiment that leads to such behaviour".

== Controversies ==
On 13 June 2024, the Gujarat High Court issued an interim stay on the release of Maharaj. This decision was in response to a petition by members of the Pushtimarg sect, who argued that the film, based on the Maharaj Libel Case of 1862, contained content that could incite violence and offend religious sentiments. However, after reviewing the film, Justice Sangeeta K. Vishen lifted the stay, stating that the film did not target the sect and had been appropriately certified by the Central Board of Film Certification. Consequently, the film was allowed to stream on Netflix from June 21, 2024.
