= Bharti Sharma =

Indian actress (born 1961)

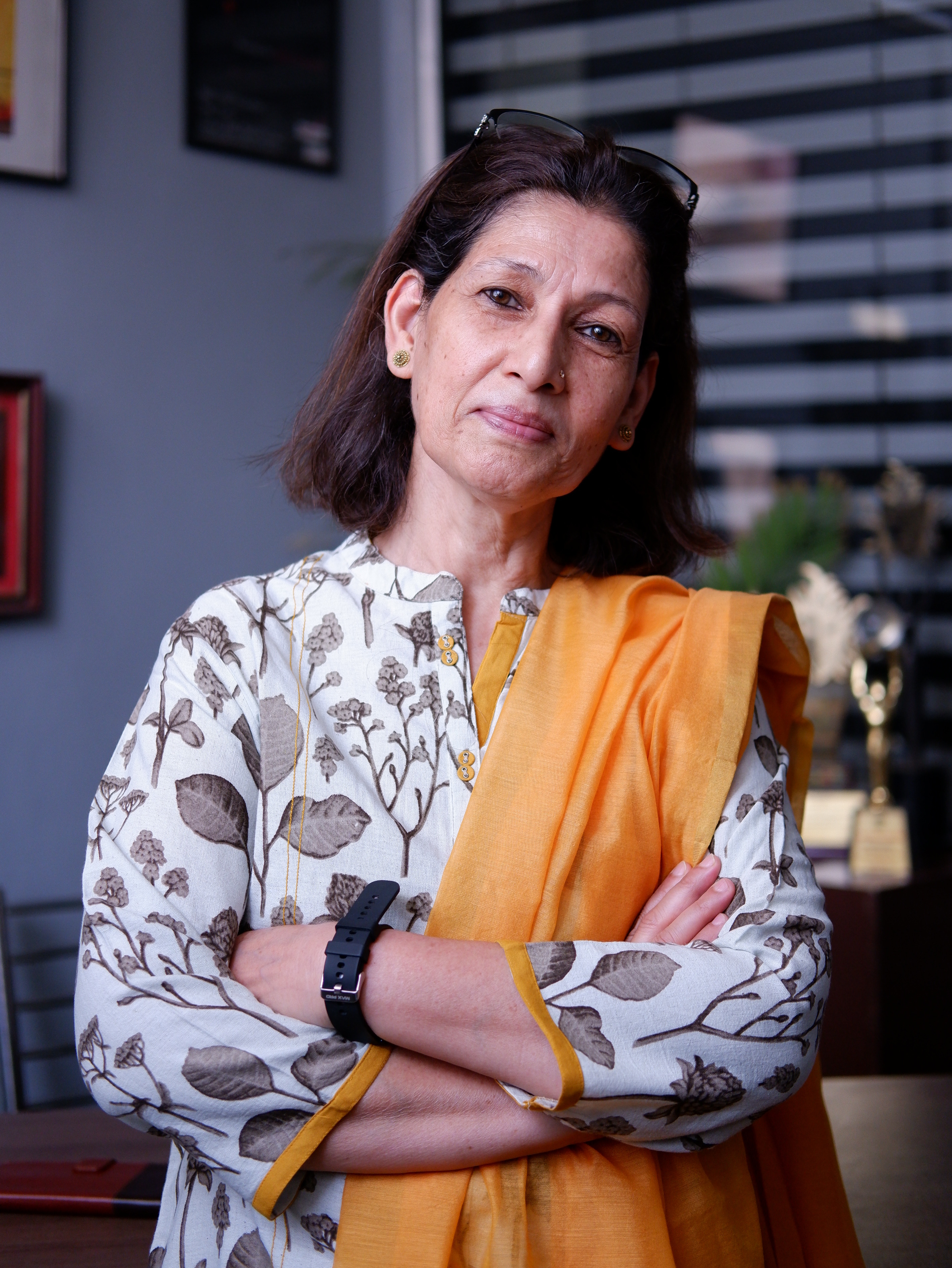
- Bharti Sharma in 2022
- Born: 15 October 1961 (age 65); New Delhi, India
- Education: National School of Drama
- Occupations: Actor; director; Teacher
- Years active: 1972–present
- Organization(s): Kshitij Theatre Group (founder, director)
- Children: Divyanshu Kumar
- Honours: Sangeet Natak Akademi (2019)

Bharti Sharma (born 15 October 1961), M.A. (Hindi) from Delhi University, National School of Drama Graduate (1987), is an Indian theater director, actor, and teacher. Her plays cover a variety of topics such as historical, realistic, experimental, plays based on man woman relationship, Indian mythological and philosophical themes.

== Career ==
Sharma after graduating from the National School of Drama in 1987 founded the Kshitij Theater Group with Bipin Kumar and few other NSD graduates. She has acted in more than 50 plays and directed more than 35 plays. She has participated in many National and International Theater Festival like 8th Theater Olympics, Bharat Rang Mahotasav, Mohan Rakesh Samman Samaroh, Bhartendu Natya Utsav, Kathmandu International Theater Festival 2008, National Women Directors Theater Festival, Bhopal and Chandigarh, Sangeet Natak Theater Festival, Chandigarh, Odean Theatre Festival etc.

=== Stage dramatizations ===
Title	Written by	Dramatized by
Goli Ek Paidayishi Ghulam	Acharya Chatursen	Bharti Sharma
Purnavatar	Pramathnath Bishi	Bharti Sharma
Begum Zainabadi	Sharad Pagare	Bharti Sharma
Ab Na Banegi Dehri	Padama Sachdeva	Bharti Sharma

=== Directing ===
Title	Written by	Directed in the year/for
Andha Yug	Dharamvir Bharati	2015, Kshitij, Delhi
Aadhe Adhure	Mohan Rakesh	2013, Sahitya Kala Parishad, Delhi
Raag Droh	Ras Behari Dutt	2012, Sahitya Kala Parishad, Delhi
Ab Na Banegi Dehri	Padama Sachdeva	2012, Kshitij, Delhi
Dilli Jo Ek Shahar Tha	Danish Iqbal	2011, Sahitya Kala Parishad, Delhi
Begum Zainabadi	Sharad Pagare	2010, Kshitij, Delhi
Episode In The Life of An Author	Example	2010, Kshitij, Delhi
Kandhe Par Baitha Tha Shaap	Meera Kant	2010, Hindi Academy, Delhi
Sabse Bada Dharma	Renu Kumari	2008, Sahitya Kala Parishad, Delhi
Pandit Jagannath	Sudhir Kulkarni	2007, Kshitij, Delhi
Nepatthya Raag	Meera Kant	2005, Sahitya Kala Parishad, Delhi
Main Hoon Na ... (In Time & Space)	Pramatnath Bishi	2003, Kshitij, Delhi
Goli Ek Paidayishi Ghulam	Acharya Chatursen	2001, Kshitij, Delhi
Pahaunch Wala Aadami	Alexander Gelman	1994, Kshitij, Delhi
Karmabhoomi	Vidhyadhar Pundlik	1993 & 2017, Kshitij, Delhi
Tughlaq	Girish Karnad	2017, Kshitij, Delhi
Peele Scooter Wala Aadami aur Bali aur Shambhu (Page 11)	Manav Kaul	2019, Kshitij, Delhi
Guilty! My Lord	Hindi Adaptation of "Witness For The Prosecution" by Agatha Christie	2019, Kshitij, Delhi
Aisa Kehtey Hein	Manav Kaul	2020, Kshitij, Delhi
Khoob Ladhi Mardaani Subhadra Ki Zubani	Asif Ali	National School of Drama Repertory Company, Delhi

|Dial M For Murder ||Adaptation of Fredrick Knott's play||2022, Kshitij, Delhi |-

|Best Murder Mystery ever ever ever || Improvised || 2022, Kshitij, Delhi |-

=== Television and film ===
Year	Title	Medium	Role
1991-1993	Tana Bana	Television	Co-host (40 episodes)
1993-1994	Gadbad Ghotala	Television	Writer, director, producer (13 episodes)
2001	Kaala Heera	Film	Producer, writer, actor
2015	Pahaunch Wala Aadami	Television play	Director, actor
1992	Bhanvar	TV serial	Lead female character
1990	Vo Ghar	TV serial	Lead female character
2021	Hush Hush	Webseries on Amazon Prime Video	Actor as Manjeet
2023	Heeramandi	Webseries on Netflix	Actor as Gurbaksh Kaur
2025	Aankhon Ki Gustaakhiyan	Hindi movie	Actor as Noora Aunty

== Awards ==
She is Sangeet Natak Academi Awardee (2019). The screen play of the film Kaala Heera written by her was Zee TV's entry for best screen play in Asian T.V. and Film Awards in 2001. She has also been awarded with senior fellowship by Ministry of Culture, Govt. of India for her research work entitled "Changing Styles and Methods of Theater Acting". She has been awarded the Best Actress Award by Natsamarat in 2013. She has been conferred JP Loknayak National Award 2020 for outstanding work in Hindi Theater., she is conferred with Zohra Sehgal National Raas Rang Samman, 2022 by the Raas Kala Manch, Safidon, Panipat
