= Tu Yaa Main =

2026 Indian film by Bejoy Nambiar

- Theatrical release poster
- Directed by: Bejoy Nambiar
- Written by: Abhishek Arun Bandekar
- Story by: Himanshu Sharma
- Based on: The Pool by Ping Lumpraploeng
- Produced by: Aanand L. Rai; Himanshu Sharma; Vinod Bhanushali; Kamlesh Bhanushali
- Starring: Adarsh Gourav; Shanaya Kapoor
- Cinematography: Remy Dalai
- Edited by: Priyank Prem Kumar
- Music by: Songs: Rai Harrie; Adarsh Gourav; Aditya N Sez on the Beat; Dhruv Visvanath; Chaitanya Pandit; 2Sharc; Pextyle; Score: Prateek Rajagopal
- Production companies: Colour Yellow Productions; Bhanushali Studios
- Distributed by: PVR Inox Pictures
- Release date: 13 February 2026
- Running time: 143 minutes
- Country: India
- Language: Hindi
- Box office: est. ₹8.41 crore

Tu Yaa Main (transl. You or me) is a 2026 Indian Hindi-language survival thriller film directed by Bejoy Nambiar and written by Abhishek Arun Bandekar from a story by Himanshu Sharma. An official adaptation of the 2018 Thai film The Pool, it is produced by Sharma and presenter Aanand L. Rai under Colour Yellow Media and Entertainment, and Vinod Bhanushali and Kamlesh Bhanushali under Bhanushali Studios. Starring Adarsh Gourav and Shanaya Kapoor in the lead roles, it follows a Mumbai-based influencer couple from opposite sides of the socioeconomic divide who must navigate their way out of an abandoned pool at a secluded resort in Goa when a crocodile enters the pool.

The film was released theatrically on 13 February 2026, coinciding with the Valentine's Day weekend. It received mixed reviews from critics.

== Plot ==
A runaway bride is killed by a crocodile while trying to seduce her two male friends in a lake. Elsewhere, a young man and a young woman are trapped inside a drained swimming pool, arguing.

The story flashes to an interview shoot, where Avani "Miss Vanity" Shah from Colaba and Maruti "Aala Flowpara" Kadam a.k.a. Flo from Nalasopara are social media influencers narrating the story of their encounter with each other which blossomed into a relationship. A flashback reveals their past lives: Maruti and Avani first meet near her house when he gets into a scuffle with the security guards nearby trying to shoot his next rap video. At a concert, they meet again; he convinces her for a collaboration and she leaves with him. Slowly, they begin dating and enter into a relationship, much to the chagrin of her sister Tara, brother-in-law Vikram and friend-cum-manager Layla. Maruti doesn't know how to swim. Avani bonds with the Kadam family and, after learning she is pregnant, moves into the Kadam household, leaving Tara, Vikram and Layla worried.

When Maruti is unable to contain himself after an argument, Avani decides to undertake a trip to Goa with him so they can ease out; Tara and Vikram, along with Layla, drop off some of her essential belongings at the Kadam household. Avani and Maruti stay at a secluded beach resort on the way to Goa, her pet dog Popo keeping them company along the way, after his bike breaks down. They briefly argue about aborting the baby. Hours later, while he is gone to get the bike repaired, she enters the hotel's swimming pool, which is under maintenance and about to be drained on instructions from an inspection team, one of whose members leaves behind a whistle for her. While Maruti is busy getting his bike repaired, Tawde, a local police officer who directed the couple to the resort, warns him of a crocodile on the loose. A food delivery boy and the resort manager, who was repairing the broken drainage system, are killed by the crocodile. The swimming pool is almost drained out, and by the time she realizes it, Avani finds herself far too removed from the pool's height; an attempt to retrieve her phone results in the poolside table falling on her head, injuring her.

Maruti arrives and falls into the swimming pool while trying to wake up an unconscious Avani. Once she recovers, they start arguing again until the crocodile finally enters the pool, revealing itself to be a female; at one point, it lays eggs and falls asleep for a while, giving the couple temporary relief.

Meanwhile, even as Avani and Maruti are trapped in the pool, Tawde makes several unanswered phone calls to the resort manager, hoping to get an update on the resort's security measures. Maruti manages to push the crocodile through the drain, while he and Avani close the drain hatch, blocking it out to prevent a re-entry; unfortunately, the crocodile finds a path out to the pool's periphery and kills Popo. Realizing an alternate exit enabled this tragedy, Avani enters the drain trying to find a way out, and manages to retrieve the dead resort manager's phone, but notices another crocodile. Frustrated over the unresponsive resort manager, and unaware of his fate, Tawde arrives at the hotel to find Maruti and the crocodile in the swimming pool, which has now filled up thanks to rainwater. Realizing the crocodile was responsible, he tries to save Maruti but is killed by the crocodile before Avani returns; it then bites Maruti's leg during an attempt by the couple to escape using Tawde's jeep.

Avani shoots the crocodile dead using Tawde's gun, but the jeep explodes in the process, throwing them back into the pool waters. Since Maruti can't swim, she makes one final attempt to escape through the drain by asking him to hold his breath for as long as he can. She carries him through the drain, swimming, while the other crocodile starts chasing them somewhere in between. The escape becomes a success, and she then revives an unconscious Maruti by the lakeside, following which he apologizes to her and they reconcile.

Back in the present, the interviewer asks Avani and Maruti what their romance was like; they giggle.

== Cast ==
- Adarsh Gourav as Maruti "Aala Flowpara" Kadam a.k.a. "Flo"
- Shanaya Kapoor as Avani "Miss Vanity" Shah
  - Mahima Joshi as young Avani
- Parul Gulati as Layla
- Ansh Vikas Chopra as Fabric
- Sanjay Appan as Jaggu
- Ashok Kangude as Pintya
- Kshitee Jog as Mrs. Kadam, Maruti's mother
- Rajsi Kinjalaskar as Sonali Kadam
- Amrutha Srinivasan as Tara Shah, Avani's sister
- Rajat Kaul as Vikram, Tara's husband and Avani's brother-in-law
- Rajendra Gupta as Tara's driver
- Aditi Jain as Bindiya
- Kannan Muthraj as Maruti's friend
- Benjamin Yangal as Maruti's friend
- Lil White as Maruti's friend
- Saurabh Abhyankar as Maruti's friend
- Arif Chaudhary as Maruti's friend
- Driti Panchmatia as Maruti's friend

Special appearances

- Amruta Khanvilkar as Sulochana
- Parvathy Thiruvothu as the guest in Konkan Bay
- Shrikant Yadav as Police officer Tawde

== Production ==
=== Filming ===
Principal photography commenced in June 2025. Filming concluded in November 2025.

== Music ==
Tu Yaa Main

Soundtrack album
- Released: 9 February 2026
- Recorded: 2025
- Genre: Feature film soundtrack
- Length: 28:48
- Language: Hindi
- Labels: Ishtar Music; Zee Music Company
External audio
- Official Audio Jukebox on YouTube

The original score is composed by Prateek Rajagopal. The songs for the film were written, sung and produced by Rai Harrie, Adarsh Gourav, Aditya N, Sez on the Beat, Dhruv Visvanath, Chaitanya Pandit and 2Sharc, with lyrics written by Rai Harrie, Chakori Dwivedi, 7Bantai’Z, Dhruv Visvanath, ÆbZee, Abhilasha Arun, Chaitanya Pandit, 2Sharc and Saurabh Abhyankar. The audio rights of the film were acquired by Zee Music Company. The first single, titled "Fame Us" was released on 16 January 2026. The second single titled "Jee Liya" was released on 31 January 2026. The third single titled "Naam Karu Bada" was released on 5 February 2026.

The song "Aankhein Chaar" is a direct remix of the song "Chori Chori Yun Jab Ho" from the 1988 film Paap Ki Duniya sung by Kishore Kumar, composed by Bappi Lahiri and written by Anjaan. The remix was arranged and produced by Pextyle, and published by Ishtar Music.

Track listing
| No. | Title | Lyrics | Music | Singer(s) | Length |
|---|---|---|---|---|---|
| 1. | "Fame Us" | Rai Harrie | Rai Harrie | Rai Harrie, 7Bantai'Z | 3:10 |
| 2. | "Jee Liya" | Chakori Dwivedi | Adarsh Gourav, Aditya N | Adarsh Gourav, Lothika | 3:07 |
| 3. | "Naam Karu Bada" | 7Bantai'Z | Sez on the Beat | Adarsh Gourav | 2:53 |
| 4. | "Get Your Party Started" | Dhruv Visvanath, ÆbZee, Abhilasha Arun | Dhruv Visvanath | Dhruv Visvanath, Chhavi Sodhani, Pragya Sodhani | 3:19 |
| 5. | "Jee Liya (Reprise)" | Chakori Dwivedi | Adarsh Gourav, Aditya N | Adarsh Gourav, Lothika | 3:57 |
| 6. | "MumBhai" | Chaitanya Pandit, 2Sharc | Chaitanya Pandit, 2Sharc | Chaitanya Pandit, 2Sharc | 2:01 |
| 7. | "Chandni" | David Klyton, Nitesh Patel, Nishant Mohite, Aditya Vhatkar, Yogesh Kurme, Siddesh Jammi | Kataaksh, Aditya Bisht | 7Bantai'Z | 3:38 |
| 8. | "Aala Flowpara" | Saurabh Abhyankar | Sez on the Beat | Adarsh Gourav | 3:56 |
| 9. | "Aankhein Chaar" | Anjaan | Pextyle | Kishore Kumar | 2:47 |
| Total length: | | | | | 28:48 |

== Release ==
=== Theatrical ===
Tu Yaa Main was released theatrically on 13 February 2026, coinciding with the Valentine's Day weekend.

=== Home media ===
The post-theatrical digital streaming rights of the film were acquired by Netflix, and the film began streaming on 10 April 2026.

== Reception ==
On the review aggregator website Rotten Tomatoes, 91% of 11 critics' reviews are positive, with an average rating of 5.6/10.

Rahul Desai of The Hollywood Reporter India stated that "It is silly, campy and perversely enjoyable; you come for the crocodile, stay for the humans." Bryan Durham of Variety India writes in his review that "As much as that 145-minute runtime irks you, you get it. You’re on board with Nambiar’s vision all the way to the intermission and a bit beyond as well, if I’m being honest. But films of TYM’s ilk work better with tighter pacing. It already does a lot right. If only the self-indulgence could’ve been reined in."

Rishabh Suri of Hindustan Times gave 3.5 stars out of 5 and said that "We don't see a lot of films like Tu Yaa Main being attempted in Bollywood and this one commits with sincerity." Abhishek Srivastava of The Times of India rated it 3/5 stars and stated that "The film keeps you involved while it plays out, but if you value narrative cohesion, you may find yourself wishing the two halves had merged into a more unified whole."

Anisha Rao of India Today gave 3 stars out of 5 and said that "Tu Yaa Main is a gripping thriller that fuses modern romance with edge-of-your-seat survival drama in Mumbai. With strong performances and a twist-filled story, it keeps you hooked, capturing fear, trust, and high-stakes tension in every scene." Bollywood Hungama gave it 3 stars out of 5 and stated that "TU YAA MAIN is a decently made survival thriller that benefits from Bejoy Nambiar’s slick treatment, effective jump scares and sincere performances by Adarsh Gourav and Shanaya Kapoor."

Shubhra Gupta of The Indian Express gave 2 stars out of 5 and writes that "My tip: Skip the first half, and check into this survival drama just in time for the crocs and the chaos in order to clutch your Valentine. If you feel the need to." Mayur Sanap of Rediff.com also gave 2 stars out of 5 and observed that "Tu Yaa Main feels rather indulgent for a survival drama. You can see where it's headed, and it just grows tiresome after a point."

Hardika Gupta of NDTV rated it 2/5 stars and said that "To be fair, the second half is where the film marginally redeems itself."
