= Loveyapa =

2025 Indian film by Advait Chandan

- Theatrical release poster
- Directed by: Advait Chandan
- Written by: Sneha Desai
- Based on: Love Today (2022) by Pradeep Ranganathan
- Produced by: Kalpathi S. Aghoram; Kalpathi S. Ganesh; Kalpathi S. Suresh; Pradeep Ranganathan; Madhu Mantena; Bhavna Talwar; Shristi Behl Arya
- Starring: Khushi Kapoor; Junaid Khan
- Cinematography: Rajesh Nare
- Edited by: Antara Lahiri
- Music by: White Noise Collective Tanishk Bagchi Suyyash Rai Siddharth Singh
- Production companies: AGS Entertainment; Phantom Studios
- Distributed by: Zee Studios
- Release date: 7 February 2025
- Running time: 138 minutes
- Country: India
- Language: Hindi
- Budget: ₹60 crore
- Box office: est. ₹8.99 crore

Loveyapa is a 2025 Indian Hindi-language romantic comedy film directed by Advait Chandan. A remake of the 2022 Tamil film Love Today, it stars Khushi Kapoor and Junaid Khan. It tells the story of a young couple who are forced to swap their phones before getting married.

Loveyapa was theatrically released on 7 February 2025. It received mixed reviews from critics and emerged as a box-office bomb.

== Plot ==
Loveyapa centers around the modern relationship of Baani and Gaurav. They are deeply in love, but like many Gen Z couples, their lives are heavily intertwined with their mobile phones. This becomes a point of contention when Bani's father, Atul a traditional and somewhat skeptical man, overheard their conversation and invites Gaurav to meet. After a brief conversation and few situational interactions he decides to test the strength of their bond.

Atul proposes a unique challenge: Baani and Gaurav must exchange their unlocked phones for an entire night. This means access to all their messages, photos, social media content within their devices. The idea is to expose any hidden truths or secrets that might reveal a lack of trust or compatibility.

Initially, the couple is confident. They believe they have nothing to hide. However, as their suspicion grows about each other, they delve into each other's phones, they begin to uncover aspects of each other's lives they weren't aware of. Baani discovers Gaurav's flirtatious messages with other girls, his secret erotic story group with friends while, Gaurav finds out about Baani's past relationships and some questionable online interactions including accounts continuously messaging her to be an escort.

Gaurav's sister Kiran has a relationship with dentist Anupam, a fat and not-so-good looking guy and when he questions her about the relation she explains to him that he is a trust worthy guy who respects her a lot on which they have an argument while, Anupam overhears on call their mother and her friends talking about his appearance to which he ends the call

After Anupam reveals the reason to hide the phone from Gaurav privately while he is on a call with Kiran... Anupam reveals that he is always the scapegoat of body shaming in all his friend groups which he used to hide all the time so that Kiran never change her decision due to the view of society because he always loved her. Kiran overhearing the conversation confesses her love for him.

Baani is shocked to be sent a deepfake video of her being physically intimate. The video is also shared with her dad and Gucci. Atul slaps and disowns her and the rest of the family and friends also doubt her except Gucci who then gets to know that she left the house and is nowhere to be found.

Gaurav finds Baani and says he trusts and loves her. Gucci's friends find the person responsible and it is revealed that Baani's office colleague has done this as he liked her a lot and since Baani had not paid attention to him, he did it to defame her. Atul says he did this phone swap to see how much Baani and Gaurav trust each other and now he is satisfied as Gaurav stood with Baani even in a situation like this and they finally embrace and kiss each other.

== Cast ==
- Khushi Kapoor as Baani Sharma
- Junaid Khan as Gaurav "Gucci" Sachdeva
- Ashutosh Rana as Atul Kumar Sharma, Baani's father
- Grusha Kapoor as Lalit Sachdeva, Gaurav's mother
- Kiku Sharda as Anupam Mehra, Gucci's brother-in-law
- Aaditya Kulshreshth as Lamba, Gucci's friend
- Devishi Madaan as Pinti Sharma, Baani's sister
- Tanvika Parlikar as Kiran Sachdeva, Gaurav's sister
- Kunj Anand as Puneet, Baani's colleague and lover
- Arnav Roy as Cafe waiter
- Kavita Kaushik as Kavita Bhabhi
- Sudesh Lehri as Customer in Café

== Production ==
=== Development ===
The film was announced in 2023, as a remake of the 2022 Tamil film Love Today by Pradeep Ranganathan. Junaid Khan and Khushi Kapoor were announced in September 2024 as the leads along with Advait Chandan as the director, with the film's title revealed as Loveyapa.

== Marketing ==
The first song "Loveyappa Ho Gaya" was released on 3 January 2025. The trailer was released on 11 January 2025.

== Music ==
Loveyapa

Soundtrack album by White Noise Collective, Tanishk Bagchi, Suyyash Rai, Siddharth Singh and Aman Pant
- Released: 26 February 2025
- Recorded: 2024
- Genre: Bollywood
- Length: 11:33
- Language: Hindi
- Label: Zee Music Company

Official audio
- Loveyapa Full Album on YouTube

The music of the film is composed by White Noise Collective, Tanishk Bagchi, Suyyash-Sidharth and Aman Pant while lyrics are penned by SOM, Gurpreet Saini, MellowD, Dhruv Yogi, Akshay The One and Barbie Rajput.

No.	Title	Lyrics	Music	Singer(s)	Length
1.	"Loveyapa Ho Gaya"	SOM	White Noise Collective	Nakash Aziz, Madhubanti Bagchi	2:48
2.	"Rehna Kol"	Gurpreet Saini, MellowD (rap)	Tanishk Bagchi	Jubin Nautiyal, Zahrah S. Khan, MellowD	3:44
3.	"Kaun Kinna Zaroori Si"	Dhruv Yogi	Suyyash Rai, Siddharth Singh	Vishal Mishra	2:49
4.	"Dil Da Batwara"	Aman Pant	Akshay The One, Barbie Rajput	Aman Pant, Barbie Rajput, Akshay The One	2:12
Total length:					11:33

== Release ==
=== Theatrical ===
Loveyappa was theatrically released on 7 February 2025.

=== Home media ===
The film's digital streaming rights were acquired by Disney+ Hotstar. The film began streaming on the platform from 4 April 2025.

== Reception ==
=== Critical response ===
On the review aggregator website Rotten Tomatoes, 60% of 10 critics' reviews are positive, with an average rating of 5.8/10.

Rediff.com's Sukanya Verma wrote that "Loveyapa's lacklustre leads leave much to be desired" in an inferior remake of Love Today. Nandini Ramnath of Scroll.in considered it a "faithful, mechanical remake", adding that "the leads fit their roles in terms of age, they are sometimes hard-pressed to enact the ensuing mayhem". Rishabh Suri of Hindustan Times found the film "funny only in parts", and was critical of the film's "pacing issues".

Shubhra Gupta of The Indian Express thought that the film "lacks sizzle" and wraps important stuff in oodles of banality". While expressing disappointment over the lead performances, she considered Kapoor to have more potential than Khan. Titas Chowdhury of News18 was more appreciative of the film's humour as well as the performances of Khan and Kapoor. Vineeta Kumar of India Today was also appreciative of Khan's performance, but dismissed Kapoor's work. Justin Rao of The Hollywood Reporter India had mixed opinions on the remake and Khan's performance, but appreciated Desai's dialogues as well as Kapoor's potential as a "rom com actor in the making".

=== Box-office ===
It concluded its theatrical run with worldwide gross estimated to be ₹8.99 crore.
