= Achutam Keshavam =

Hindi bhajan praising Vishnu

Achutam Keshavam (Hindi: (अचुतम केशवम) (transl. imperishable Lord of creation)), is a popular Hindi bhajan praising Vishnu. It begins with the first verse of Achyutashtakam, which was composed in Sanskrit by Adi Shankara, and continues with other verses praising Vishnu (not from Achyutashtakam).

== Lyrics ==
Each verse begins with "Achutam Keshavam Krishna Damodaram Ram narayanam Janakivallabham".

Hindi	English translation
Achutam Keshavam Krishna Damodaram Ram narayanam Janakivallabham	Imperishable Lord of creation (Krishna, Rama... various names of Vishnu)
Kaun kehte hain Bhagvan aate nahi, Hum Meera ke jaise bulate nahi	Who says God does not come before us? We don't call God like Meera
Achutam ...	
Kaun kehte hain Bhagvan khaate nahi, Ber Shabri ke jaise khilate nahi	Who says God does not eat? We don't feed God fruit like Shabari fed Rama
Achutam ...	
Kaun kehte hai Bhagvan Sote nahi, Maa Yashoda ke jaise sulate nahin	Who says God does not sleep? We don't make God sleep like mother Yashoda
Achutam …	
Kaun kehte hai Bhagvan naachte nahi, Gopiyan ki tarah hum nachaate nahin	Who says God does not dance? We don't make God dance like the gopis
Achutam …	

== Popular culture ==
Achutam Keshavam was sung by Sonu Nigam in the 2024 Hindi film Maharaj.
