= Shanaya Kapoor =

Indian actress (born 1999)

- Kapoor in 2025
- Born: 2 November 1999 (age 27); Mumbai, Maharashtra, India
- Education: École Mondiale World School
- Occupation: Actress
- Years active: 2025–present
- Parent: Sanjay Kapoor (father)
- Relatives: See Kapoor family

Shanaya Kapoor (born 2 November 1999) is an Indian actress who primarily works in Hindi films. Born to actor Sanjay Kapoor, she made her acting debut with the romantic drama Aankhon Ki Gustaakhiyan (2025).

== Early life and background ==
Kapoor was born on 2 November 1999, in Mumbai, to actor Sanjay Kapoor and Maheep Kapoor. She is the granddaughter of Surinder Kapoor and the niece of film producer Boney Kapoor and actor Anil Kapoor. She has a younger brother Jahaan Kapoor. Her cousins include actors and producers Sonam Kapoor, Arjun Kapoor, Rhea Kapoor, Harshvardhan Kapoor, Mohit Marwah, Janhvi Kapoor and Khushi Kapoor.

Kapoor completed her schooling from École Mondiale World School, Mumbai. For further studies, she did not go to film school, but instead preferred getting hands-on experience on film sets. In 2019, she participated in fashion event Bal des débutantes, held annually in Paris.

== Career ==
Kapoor started her career as an assistant director in the 2020 film Gunjan Saxena: The Kargil Girl, starring Janhvi Kapoor. Then, she appeared in the reality TV series Fabulous Lives of Bollywood Wives, in the same year. Kapoor's acting debut in Bedhadak and Screw Dheela were subsequently shelved. That year, she also appeared in a music video titled Vibe.

Kapoor in 2019

Kapoor made her acting debut in 2025 with Aankhon Ki Gustaakhiyan, where she played Saba, a theater artist opposite Vikrant Massey. Rishabh Suri of Hindustan Times felt she makes "a confident debut" despite an underwritten character. The film failed commercially.

Kapoor had two releases in 2026; she first played Avani, a social media influencer opposite Adarsh Gourav in Tu Yaa Main. Rahul Desai of The Hollywood Reporter India was appreciative of her chemistry with Gourav and felt she was "well-cast as an upscale and sheltered performer". The film underperformed at the box office. She then played Ayesha and Aditi, twin sisters in Student of the Year: After Dark, which marked her streaming debut. Devesh Sharma of Filmfare noted, "Shanaya deserves credit for making an impression. Playing contrasting twins, she brings a certain vulnerability to her characters and is more convincing in the quieter, emotionally charged moments."

Kapoor will make her Telugu film debut with Zombie Reddy 2.

== In the media ==
Kapoor with her extended family at an event in 2018. Left: Sanjay (Father); Centre Man: Boney, Right: Anil (Uncles) Centre: Khushi (in red), Janhvi (in green) (cousin sisters) Kid near Khushi: Jahaan (brother), Khushi's left: Shanaya

Kapoor has been brand ambassador for several brands including Samsung, and Puma. In 2024, she featured as cover model for Elle magazine. She works with various animal shelters for rescuing stray animals. In 2025, She co-founded Jewellery brand Indinoor.

Kapoor has been criticized since her debut announcement with Dharma Productions, for having easy access to Indian film industry due to Nepotism. Dharma production's owner Karan Johar has also commented that she does have a lineage benefit.

== Filmography ==
Key
†	Denotes films that have not yet been released

=== Films ===
Year	Title	Role	Notes	Ref.
2020	Gunjan Saxena: The Kargil Girl	—N/a	Assistant director	
2025	Aankhon Ki Gustaakhiyan	Saba Shergill		
2026	Tu Yaa Main	Avani "Miss Vanity" Shah		
2027	Jacob Cardoso †	TBA	Completed	
2027	Zombie Reddy 2 - NXT LVL †	TBA	Telugu film; Filming	

=== Web series ===
Year	Title	Role	Notes	Ref.
2020	Fabulous Lives of Bollywood Wives	Herself	Cameo appearance	
2026	Student of the Year: After Dark	Aayesha Malik / Aditi Malik		

=== Music video ===
Year	Title	Singer(s)	Ref.
2025	VIBE	Guru Randhawa, French Montana	

== Awards and nominations ==
Year	Award	Category	Work	Result	Ref.
2024	ELLE Beauty Awards	Rising Star of the Year	—N/a	Won	
2026	Femina Beauty Awards	Fresh Face of the Year	—N/a	Won	
2026	Iconic Gold Awards	Emerging Face Of The Year	Aankhon Ki Gustaakhiyan	Won	
