= Maahi (singer) =

Indian singer, songwriter and performer

- Born: Shubh Mukherji; May 18, 2005 (age 21); India
- Occupations: Singer, songwriter
- Years active: 2024–present
- Father: Shaan Mukherji
- Relatives: Sagarika (aunt)
- Musical career
- Genre: Bollywood
- Instruments: Vocals; guitar
- Label: Saregama

Shubh Mukherji, known professionally as Maahi is an Indian singer, songwriter, and performer who works primarily in Hindi music. He made his Bollywood playback debut in 2025 with the song "Tera Kya Karoon" from the film Nadaaniyan. Before entering film music, he released independent singles and his debut extended play (EP) Talab (2025). He was named Amazon Music's Breakthrough Artist of 2025. He was also featured in Rolling Stone India's "Future of Music" list in 2025.

== Early life and background ==
Maahi was born Shubh Mukherji in Mumbai, Maharashtra, into a family with a prominent musical lineage. He is the son of Indian playback singer Shaan and Radhika Mukherjee, and the grandson of music director Manas Mukherjee. His aunt, Sagarika, is also an actress and singer.

Maahi was exposed to playback singing, stagecraft, and live performances from a young age, frequently attending his father's concerts. He began formal classical music training at the age of seven. Today, the brothers frequently share the stage, performing alongside their father at events in India and internationally.

== Career ==
=== 2024: Independent debut and Cannes performance ===
Maahi launched his independent music career in February 2024 with his debut pop single "Sorry," released under the Saregama Music label. He followed this with acoustic and pop-infused singles such as "Jaadugari" (his first collaboration with his elder brother Soham, who produced the track), "Tere Saath," and "Meri Kya Khata." In May 2024, Maahi gained international exposure when he performed alongside Shaan and Soham at the Bharat Parv cultural showcase during the Cannes Film Festival in France.

=== 2025–present: Bollywood debut and EPs ===
In 2025, Maahi made his transition into Bollywood playback singing with the track "Tera Kya Karoon" for the film Nadaaniyan, composed by Sachin–Jigar with lyrics by Amitabh Bhattacharya.

In the independent space, 2025 saw the release of "Dil Behkaaye" and the emotional ballad "Jaan Se Zyada." The music video for the latter notably featured his parents. In June 2025, Maahi was featured on a digital billboard in New York's Times Square. In October 2025, he released his debut extended play (EP), Talab, a conceptual project featuring a continuous narrative across four tracks.

Continuing his momentum into 2026, he released the singles "Arzoo" and "Baatein Teri". In August 2026, Maahi released his second EP, Yours With Love, featuring an acoustic version of his early hit "Jaadugari" alongside new tracks like "Dil Ne Kaha" and "Marz-E-Dawa." He also released the independent single "Pakki Yaariyan".

=== Artistry and influences ===
Maahi has publicly stated that his musical vision includes elevating "I-pop" (Indian Pop) to a global stage, drawing structural parallels to the international expansion of K-pop. While deeply rooted in Indian musical traditions through his classical training, his sound blends Hindi lyrics with acoustic guitar, soul, and contemporary pop elements.

== Discography ==
=== Extended plays ===
Year	EP(s)	Song(s)	Notes/Ref(s)
2025	Talab	"Talab"	Debut EP featuring the music video tracks "Talab".
2025	Talab	"Vaari Vaari"	Debut EP featuring the music video tracks "Talab".
2025	Talab	"Raahein"	Debut EP featuring the music video tracks "Talab".
2025	Talab	"Dildari"	Debut EP featuring the music video tracks "Talab".
2026	Yours With Love	"Jaadugari (Acoustic)"	Second EP, released in August 2026.
2026	Yours With Love	"Dil Ne Kaha"	Second EP, released in August 2026.
2026	Yours With Love	"Marz-E-Dawa"	Second EP, released in August 2026.

=== Singles ===
Year	Song	Producer	Notes	Ref(s)
2024	"Sorry"	Kalki	Debut single	
2024	"Jaadugari"	Soham Mukherji	First collaboration with his brother	
2024	"Tere Saath"	Kalki		
2024	"Meri Kya Khata"	Kalki		
2025	"Na Tum Jano Na Hum"	Abhijit Vaghani		
2025	"Dil Behkaaye"	Rutvik & Harjot		
2025	"Jaan Se Zyada"	Zain & Sam	Music video features his parents	
2026	"Arzoo"	Neversoober	First collaboration with Neversoober.	
2026	"Baatein Teri"	Thought		
2026	"Pakki Yaariyan"	Kalki		

=== Film songs ===
Year	Film	Song	Composer(s)
2025	Nadaaniyan	"Tera Kya Karoon"	Sachin–Jigar
