= Tashan (film) =

2008 Indian film by Vijay Krishna Acharya

- Theatrical release poster
- Directed by: Vijay Krishna Acharya
- Written by: Vijay Krishna Acharya
- Produced by: Aditya Chopra
- Starring: Akshay Kumar; Saif Ali Khan; Kareena Kapoor; Anil Kapoor
- Cinematography: Ayananka Bose
- Edited by: Rameshwar S. Bhagat
- Music by: Songs: Vishal–Shekhar; Score: Ranjit Barot
- Production company: Yash Raj Films
- Distributed by: Yash Raj Films
- Release date: 25 April 2008
- Running time: 148 minutes
- Country: India
- Language: Hindi
- Budget: ₹31 crore
- Box office: ₹51 crore

Tashan (transl. 'Style) is a 2008 Indian Hindi-language action masala film written and directed by Vijay Krishna Acharya in his directorial debut, and produced by Aditya Chopra under Yash Raj Films. It stars Akshay Kumar, Saif Ali Khan, Kareena Kapoor, and Anil Kapoor. The story follows a call centre executive, a gangster's aide, and a con woman involved in a chaotic pursuit across India.

Principal photography took place in Ladakh, Rajasthan, Kerala, and Haridwar, with additional sequences filmed in Greece.

Tashan was released on 25 April 2008 and received mixed reviews from critics who praised the music, visuals, and Kumar’s performance, but criticised the screenplay and tone. The film underperformed at the box office but gained a cult following over time, particularly for its soundtrack and stylized presentation.

== Plot ==
Jeetendra Kumar Makwana, also known as Jimmy Cliff, is a call centre executive and part-time English tutor. He is approached by Pooja Singh, who requests private lessons. Jimmy quickly agrees, attracted to her, but soon discovers that the lessons are actually intended for her employer, Lakhan Singh Ballebaaz—also known as Bhaiyyaji—a volatile gangster with aspirations to speak English.

As Jimmy and Pooja grow closer, she reveals that she is working for Bhaiyyaji only to repay her debts and eventually travel to Haridwar to scatter her father’s ashes. The two conspire to steal Bhaiyyaji’s money and escape. They succeed, and Jimmy returns to his office to resign, only to be intercepted by ACP Kuldeep Singh Hooda, who warns him of Bhaiyyaji's violent history. Jimmy rushes back but finds Pooja has disappeared with the money.

Bhaiyyaji hires a mercenary named Bachchan Pandey to retrieve Jimmy. After Jimmy is captured upon having surrendered, the two travel together in search of Pooja, eventually reaching Haridwar. Although they spot her briefly, she evades them. During their continued pursuit, their vehicle crashes into a river during an argument. Pooja unexpectedly emerges from the car’s trunk, revealing she had been hiding there and that the stolen money is hidden in seven different locations across India.

Jimmy and Pooja plan to reclaim the money and escape again. As part of their plan, Pooja attempts to seduce Bachchan, but realizes he is her childhood sweetheart. The two rekindle their relationship and fall in love. After recovering all the money, Bachchan attempts to leave with it, unaware that Jimmy has swapped the cash with stones. When Pooja learns of the deception, she tells Jimmy that Bhaiyyaji had murdered her father, Vikram Singh (alias "Tiger"), to seize his criminal empire.

Jimmy and Pooja rush to save Bachchan, who is captured by Bhaiyyaji. At Bhaiyyaji’s hideout, Jimmy pretends to betray his companions and requests a gun to kill Bachchan, but instead turns the weapon on Bhaiyyaji, taking him hostage. As they attempt to escape, Bhaiyyaji breaks free, triggering a gunfight. In the final confrontation, Pooja kills Bhaiyyaji with a sword.

In the aftermath, Jimmy opens his own call centre staffed entirely by women, while Bachchan and Pooja marry.

== Cast ==
- Akshay Kumar as Bachchan Pande
  - Mayank Naresh Tandon as a young Bachchan, who was given the nickname "Ulluram" by his crush, village girl Gudiya, in reality an adult Pooja
- Saif Ali Khan as Jeetendra Kumar Makwana a.k.a. Jimmy Cliff
  - Ibrahim Ali Khan as a preteen Jeetendra
- Kareena Kapoor as Pooja "Gudiya" Singh
  - Benazir Shaikh as a young Gudiya, who was unable to meet her lover she nicknamed "Ulluram", in reality an adult Bachchan
- Anil Kapoor as Lakhan Singh Ballebaaz a.k.a. Bhaiyyaji
- Sanjay Mishra as Balakram Misir
- Yashpal Sharma as ACP Kuldeep Singh Hooda
- Manoj Pahwa as Anand Mohan Tiwari a.k.a. Pintu
- Rajesh Jais as Pankaj Tiwari
- Sreejita De as Parvati

== Production ==
=== Development ===
Tashan marked the directorial debut of Vijay Krishna Acharya, who had previously written for Dhoom (2004) and Dhoom 2 (2006). Pre-production began in late 2006, with the screenplay emphasizing a blend of action and stylized comedy.

The film continued Saif Ali Khan’s collaboration with Yash Raj Films following Hum Tum (2004) and Salaam Namaste (2005). It also marked a return to the studio for Akshay Kumar (Dil To Pagal Hai, 1997), Kareena Kapoor (Mujhse Dosti Karoge!, 2002), and Anil Kapoor (Lamhe, 1991).

Costume designer Aki Narula developed distinct looks for the lead cast to complement the film’s stylized tone.

=== Casting ===
Kumar was the first actor signed, followed by Khan and Kareena Kapoor. In early 2007, Anil Kapoor joined the cast to portray a villain, marking his first negative role. Ibrahim Ali Khan, Khan’s son, made his screen debut as the younger version of his father’s character.

=== Filming ===
Principal photography began in June 2007 in Kerala, followed by shooting schedules in Ladakh, Rajasthan, and Haridwar. Additional scenes were filmed in Mumbai, where Kareena Kapoor and Saif Ali Khan were photographed during production in the Fort area in September 2007. Two musical sequences were filmed on location in Greece, on the islands of Milos and in the coastal town of Nafplio.

== Marketing and release ==
The first teaser for Tashan premiered on 30 November 2007 with the release of Aaja Nachle. In a poll by IndiaFM, the film was voted the "Most Awaited Movie of 2008."

The film was released theatrically on 25 April 2008 by Yash Raj Films in India and international markets.

== Soundtrack ==
Tashan

Soundtrack album by Vishal–Shekhar
- Released: 27 March 2008 (Digital Release); 25 April 2008 (Film)
- Recorded: 26:33
- Genre: Film soundtrack
- Label: YRF Music
- Producer: Vishal–Shekhar

Vishal–Shekhar chronology
Om Shanti Om (2007)	Tashan (2008)	Bhoothnath (2008)

The soundtrack was composed by Vishal–Shekhar, with lyrics written by Piyush Mishra, Anvita Dutt Guptan, Vishal Dadlani, and Kausar Munir. It was released on 27 March 2008 under the YRF Music label.

The album received positive reviews from critics. Joginder Tuteja of IndiaFM rated it 4 out of 5 stars, describing it as consistently engaging and highlighting “Dil Dance Maare,” “Dil Haara,” and “Falak Tak” as standout tracks.

The soundtrack debuted at number three on the music charts and rose to the top position during the week of the film’s release. According to Box Office India, approximately 1.5 million units were sold, making it the ninth highest-selling Bollywood soundtrack of 2008.

Track listing
No.	Title	Lyrics	Singer(s)	Length
1.	"Dil Haara"	Piyush Mishra	Sukhwinder Singh	5:51
2.	"Chhaliya"	Anvita Dutt	Sunidhi Chauhan, Piyush Mishra	4:43
3.	"Dil Dance Maare"	Vishal Dadlani	Sukhwinder Singh, Udit Narayan, Sunidhi Chauhan	5:21
4.	"Falak Tak"	Kausar Munir	Udit Narayan, Mahalaxmi Iyer	5:52
5.	"Tashan Mein"	Piyush Mishra, Vishal Dadlani	Vishal Dadlani, Master Saleem	5:06

== Reception ==
=== Box office ===
Prior to release, Tashan recorded advance bookings of approximately 25–35% across major centres. On its opening day, the film registered 75–80% occupancy but fell short of expectations due to a revenue-sharing dispute between Yash Raj Films and multiplex chains, which delayed the film's release in major multiplexes across India. As a result, the film earned ₹180 million in its first week. Following a resolution between the distributor and exhibitors, the film was released in multiplexes from 3 May 2008, adding another ₹70 million to its domestic gross. It was ultimately declared a below-average performer at the box office.

Internationally, the film opened to a tepid response. In its first week, Tashan collected £181,838 on 46 screens in the United Kingdom, debuting at number 13. In the United States, it debuted at number 24 with a gross of $301,226 from 75 screens, while in Australia it opened at number 17, collecting $148,087 on 13 screens. The film witnessed significant drops in subsequent weeks and was also rated below average in overseas markets.

=== Critical response ===
Tashan received mixed reviews from critics. In India, the film drew criticism for its screenplay and direction. Taran Adarsh of IndiaFM rated it 1.5 out of 5, calling it “one of the weakest films to come out of the Yash Raj banner.” Rajeev Masand from CNN-IBN described it as “a road movie going in all the wrong directions.” Conversely, Sanjay Ram awarded the film 3.5 out of 5, noting that despite flaws, the film remained “engaging and entertaining.”

International reviews were comparatively more positive. Rachel Saltz of The New York Times described the film’s visual excess as fitting with its “tongue-in-cheek tone.” Frank Lovece of Film Journal International highlighted its “dry humor, cartoonishly violent set pieces,” and “gorgeously shot musical numbers.” Maitland McDonagh of TV Guide called it “a nutty, ridiculously entertaining neo-noir pastiche,” praising its blend of genre influences.

Performances from the central cast were also met with mixed reactions. Kumar and Kareena received praise, while Khan and Anil garnered more divided responses. Adarsh wrote that Kumar was “the lifeline of this project” and called Kareena “fantastic.” Sonia Chopra of Sify stated that Kumar and Kareena “sizzle” but noted that Khan’s performance was “lukewarm” and Anil played the antagonist “to the hilt.”

== Accolades ==
Award	Category	Recipients	Result	Ref.
Screen Awards	Best Actor in a Negative Role	Anil Kapoor	Nominated	
Stardust Awards	Best Actor in a Negative Role	Anil Kapoor	Won	
Annual Central European Bollywood Awards	Best Supporting Actor	Anil Kapoor	Nominated	
