= Ibrahim Ali Khan (actor) =

Indian actor (born 2001)

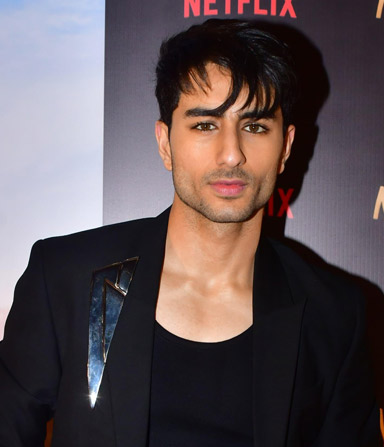
- Khan in 2025
- Born: Ibrahim Ali Khan Pataudi; 5 March 2001 (age 25); Mumbai, Maharashtra, India
- Education: New York Film Academy (BFA)
- Occupation: Actor
- Years active: 2023–present
- Height: 5 ft 11 in (181 cm)
- Parents: Saif Ali Khan (father); Amrita Singh (mother)
- Relatives: Kareena Kapoor Khan (step mother) Pataudi family

Ibrahim Ali Khan Pataudi (born 5 March 2001) is an Indian actor who works in Hindi films. Born to actors Saif Ali Khan and Amrita Singh, he had his first acting role as a child as the younger version of his father's character in Tashan (2008). As an adult, he had his first leading role in the poorly-received Netflix romantic comedy film Nadaaniyan (2025).

== Early life and background ==
Ibrahim Ali Khan was born on 5 March 2001 in Mumbai, Maharashtra, to Saif Ali Khan and Amrita Singh. Both his parents are actors in the Hindi film industry ‘Bollywood’ Khan is of Pashtun, Bengali and Assamese descent on his father's side and of Punjabi descent on his mother's side.

Khan is the grandson of Mansoor Ali Khan Pataudi, Sharmila Tagore and Rukhsana Sultana. He is also the great-grandson of Iftikhar Ali Khan Pataudi and Sajida Sultan, the great-great-grandson of Jnanadabhiram Barua and Hamidullah Khan, the great-great-great-grandson of Sultan Jahan Begum, Gaganendranath Tagore and Gunabhiram Barua, and the nephew of Soha Ali Khan and Saba Ali Khan. He has an older sister, Sara, who is also an actor, and two half-brothers from his father's second marriage to Kareena Kapoor Khan.

Khan completed his schooling at Dhirubhai Ambani International School in Mumbai, and completed a filmmaking course at the New York Film Academy. and went to Blundells School, Tiverton

Khan had developed a keen interest in acting from a young age after his first acting role at age seven as the younger version of his father's character in Tashan (2008). His father recalls him being upset following the film's commercial and critical failure. Later in 2023, Khan worked as an assistant director for Karan Johar on his film Rocky Aur Rani Kii Prem Kahaani (2023), which featured Sara in a special appearance.

== Career ==
In 2025, Khan had his first leading role opposite Khushi Kapoor in Johar's company Dharmatic Entertainment's romantic comedy film Nadaaniyan, for Netflix. He played Arjun Mehta, a scholarship student who is paid by his wealthy classmate (Kapoor) to pose as her boyfriend. The film was panned by critics. The Hindu's Anuj Kumar bemoaned that Khan "has yet to befriend the camera and seems to be reading his lines instead of rendering them", but thought that he showed potential. Rishabh Suri of Hindustan Times was more critical of Khan's performance, deeming it a one-dimensional "poor debut".

Khan next appeared alongside Prithviraj Sukumaran and Kajol in the Johar-produced thriller Sarzameen, that released on JioHotstar. He played Harman Menon, an army officer's estranged son who has joined a militant group. Khan shot for the film before his debut in Nadaaniyan. His performance was, again, poorly-received by critics. Nandini Ramnath of Scroll.in disliked the film found Khan to be "unequipped to portray Harman's seething rage or emotional conflict". Khan will next star in the sports drama Diler, directed and produced by Kunal Deshmukh and Dinesh Vijan, respectively.

== Filmography ==
=== Films ===
Key
†	Denotes films that have not yet been released

Year	Title	Role	Notes	Ref.
2008	Tashan	Young Jeetendra "Jimmy"	Child artist	
2023	Rocky Aur Rani Kii Prem Kahaani	—N/a	Assistant director	
2025	Nadaaniyan	Arjun Mehta	Netflix film	
2025	Sarzameen	Harman Menon	JioHotstar film	
TBA	Diler †	TBA	Filming	

=== Television ===
Year	Title	Role	Notes	Ref.
2025	The Ba***ds of Bollywood	Himself	Cameo appearance	
