= Nadaaniyan =

Indian film by Shauna Gautam

- Official release poster
- Directed by: Shauna Gautam
- Screenplay by: Ishita Moitra; Riva Razdan Kapoor; Jehan Handa
- Story by: Riva Razdan Kapoor
- Produced by: Karan Johar; Apoorva Mehta; Somen Mishra; Adar Poonawalla
- Starring: Ibrahim Ali Khan; Khushi Kapoor; Mahima Chaudhry; Suniel Shetty; Dia Mirza; Jugal Hansraj
- Cinematography: Anuj Samtani
- Edited by: Vaishnavi Bhate; Sidhanth Seth
- Music by: Songs: Sachin-Jigar; Score: Tushar Lall
- Production company: Dharmatic Entertainment
- Distributed by: Netflix
- Release date: 7 March 2025
- Running time: 119 minutes
- Country: India
- Language: Hindi

Nadaaniyan (transl. Innocence) is a 2025 Indian Hindi-language teen romantic comedy film directed by Shauna Gautam (in her directorial debut) and produced by Karan Johar, Apoorva Mehta and Somen Mishra under Dharmatic Entertainment. The film stars Ibrahim Ali Khan (in his acting debut) and Khushi Kapoor, alongside Mahima Chaudhry, Suniel Shetty, Dia Mirza, and Jugal Hansraj. It tells the story of a privileged South Delhi school girl who gets a boyfriend-for-hire to get back at her family and classmates.

The film was released on 7 March 2025 on Netflix. The film was panned by critics, and received widespread criticism on social media due to the poor performance of the leads (Khan and Kapoor).

== Plot ==
Pia Jaisingh is a privileged South Delhi teenager who struggles in a dysfunctional family. Her misogynistic father, Rajat Jaisingh, always wanted a boy instead of Pia and is now having an affair with a younger girl named Anahita. Her mother is the long-suffering socialite, Neelu. Pia studies at the Falcon high school, where all the rich kids study. On bonfire night, Pia has a clash with her best friend Sahira. Sahira thinks Pia is having an affair with Ayan Nanda after seeing his flirty messages in Pia's phone. To make Sahira believe she's not, she tells her friends that she already has a boyfriend.

One day, Pia meets Arjun Mehta, a middle-class, career-focused student from Greater Noida. She convinces Arjun to be her fake boyfriend by paying him ₹25,000 (US$260) per week. They start meeting up and Pia shares pictures of them on social media. Her best friends no longer believe she is having an affair with Ayan and they reconcile. Later, at a dinner night with family, Rajat learns that Arjun is going to take part in an international debate competition, and he encourages Pia to take part too. Arjun is initially reluctant about Pia participating, but he eventually agrees. They begin to fall in love.

On Diwali night, Pia discovers her father's affair and learns that Anahita is pregnant. Pia is devastated; she and her mother go to her maternal house. She also breaks her phone that night. Unfortunately, the debate competition is the day after and Pia forgets about that. Arjun has meanwhile been calling Pia and sending her messages. He goes with the rest of the team and thinks that Pia used him just for timepass and did not even want to join the debate club. Later, Pia and Neelu go to Rudra's palace (a family friend) to spend some time. During that time, a photo of Rudra and Pia is posted on social media saying that they are having an affair. Pia later gets a new phone from Rudra. She remembers about the debate competition and is shocked to see her photo with Rudra on social media. Moreover, Arjun is very angry after seeing the photo and has blocked her. When Pia tries to convince Arjun about what happened, he insults her in front of the whole school, telling everyone about their deal.

Since Arjun wrote an aggressive application letter to get a scholarship at London universities, his writing is rejected and he is told to rewrite them by his teacher, Mrs Braganza. Later Arjun's father tells him how one needs to work on a relationship. Arjun slowly starts to cool down. Later on that night, Mrs Braganza comes to his house and tells him that he has got the scholarship after resubmitting the application. But Arjun is not the one who submitted it, it was Pia. Arjun also comes to know that her parents are going to get divorced. Arjun realises his mistake and tries to call Pia, but she does not answer. Later on bonfire night, he apologises to Pia and proposes to her, to which she agrees. Arjun eventually goes to London and Pia stays in India to study at a national law college, where Arjun earlier wanted to study.

== Cast ==
- Ibrahim Ali Khan as Arjun Mehta
- Khushi Kapoor as Pia Jaisingh
  - Janica Sindhi as young Pia Jaisingh
- Mahima Chaudhry as Neelu Jaisingh, Pia's mother
- Suniel Shetty as Rajat Jaisingh, Pia's father
- Dia Mirza as Nandini Mehta, Arjun's mother
- Jugal Hansraj as Dr. Sanjay Mehta, Arjun's father
- Archana Puran Singh as Mrs Braganza Malhotra, reprising her role from Kuch Kuch Hota Hai (1998)
- Barun Chanda as Dhanraj Jaisingh, Pia's grandfather
- Aaliyah Qureishi as Sahira Nair
  - Garima Malik as young Sahira
- Apoorva Makhija as Rhea Vohra
  - Nia Garg as young Rhea
- Agasthya Shah as Aakash Goenka
- Dev Agasteya as Ayaan Nanda
- Neel Dewan as Veer
- Nikhat Hegde as Rani Priyanjali
- Meezaan Jafri as Kunwar Rudra Pratap Singh (cameo appearance)
- Riya Sen as Anahita, Rajat's girlfriend (cameo appearance)
- Orhan "Orry" Awatramani as himself
- Shivam Gupta as Braganza's Nerd

== Production ==
Nadaaniyan marks the directorial debut of Shauna Gautam, who was an assistant director to producer Karan Johar on his directorial Rocky Aur Rani Kii Prem Kahaani (2023). It also marks the acting debut of Ibrahim Ali Khan, the son of actor Saif Ali Khan and actress Amrita Singh.

== Music ==
Nadaaniyan

Soundtrack album by Sachin–Jigar
- Released: 4 March 2025
- Genre: Feature film soundtrack
- Length: 25:13
- Language: Hindi
- Label: Sony Music India

Sachin–Jigar chronology
Vicky Vidya Ka Woh Wala Video (2024)	Nadaaniyan (2025)	Maalik (2025)
External audio
- Audio Jukebox on YouTube

The film's music was composed by Sachin–Jigar while lyrics was written by Amitabh Bhattacharya. The first single titled "Ishq Mein" was released on 3 February 2025. The second single titled "Galatfehmi" was released on 17 February 2025. The third single titled "Nadaaniyan" was released on 4 March 2025.

Track listing
No.	Title	Singer(s)	Length
1.	"Ishq Mein"	Sachet Tandon, Asees Kaur, Sachin–Jigar, Shruti Dhasmana, Sarah Moidutty, Sahil Vishwakarma	4:22
2.	"Galatfahmi"	Tushar Joshi, Madhubanti Bagchi, Sachin–Jigar	4:26
3.	"Nadaaniyan"	Varun Jain, Jonita Gandhi, Sachin–Jigar, Shruti Dhasmana, Neuman Pinto, Anandi-Aheeri, Sahil Vishwakarma	3:59
4.	"Tirkit Dhoom"	Vishal Dadlani, Shradha Mishra, Sachin–Jigar	2:56
5.	"Tera Kya Karoon?"	Sachin–Jigar, Maahi	3:08
6.	"Tera Kya Karoon?" (Alt. Version)	Sachin–Jigar	3:10
7.	"Galatfehmi" (Female Version)	Madhubanti Bagchi, Sachin–Jigar	3:12
Total length:			25:13

== Release ==
The film premiered at a special screening to mark Ibrahim Ali Khan's birthday on 5 March 2025. It released on 7 March 2025 on Netflix.

== Reception ==
On the review aggregator website Rotten Tomatoes, 12% of 17 critics' reviews are positive, with an average rating of 3.8/10.

Nandini Ramnath of Scroll.in opined, "The mostly breezy and quickly forgettable film rolls out the requisite packaging needed to justify itself. You have the bright lighting, modish costumes and appropriate Gen Z lingo, but not the compelling characters or unexpected scenarios that might generate emotional investment in exaggerated conflicts." NDTV's Saibal Chatterjee termed it "a passably lively but spectacularly shallow rom-com", adding that despite addressing certain serious themes, "its tone being steadfastly glib, its well-meaning postulations do not quite hit home".

Sukanya Verma of Rediff.com reviewed, "Recycling the likes of Drive Me Crazy and ilk for its hackneyed plot and a wannabe attempt at Never Have I Ever's self-aware humour, Nadaaniyan's lack of charm, chemistry and cheek fails to create any ripples." Hindustan Times' Rishabh Suri wrote that the "world of Nadaaniyan exists in a bubble, isolated from the realities of life", and criticised the screenplay of Ishita Moitra, Riva Razdan Kapoor and Jehan Handa for its "tone-deaf portrayal of school life". Similarly, Mid-Day's Bohini Bandopadhyay opined that the script felt AI-generated. Shubhra Gupta of The Indian Express also found the film "tone deaf, and offensive, in a plot that feels like a rehash of every Karan Johar rom com ever made, without his trademark sparkle".

Writing for The Hollywood Reporter India, Rahul Desai dismissed the performances of both Khushi Kapoor and Ibrahim Ali Khan, and bemoaned that the film "blunts the Dharma Productions’ shtick of meta gags, woke updates and confessional storytelling". Mint Lounge's Uday Bhatia found Jugal Hansraj and Dia Mirza's performances to be the sole positive aspects of an "uninspired, unsure film". Vineeta Kumar of India Today labelled the film "dated" and "unsalvageable", and was particularly unimpressed with the chemistry between Kapoor and Khan. Lachmi Deb Roy of Firstpost found it an "utterly immature dramedy" and panned Kapoor's "expressionless face and frozen smile". The Hindu's Anuj Kumar criticised it as another attempt of producer Karan Johar to launch nepo babies, and was dismissive of Khan's performance, writing that he "seems to be reading his lines instead of rendering them".
