= Student of the Year (TV series) =

2026 Indian television series

- Also known as: Student of the Year: After Dark
- Genre: Thriller
- Directed by: Reema Maya
- Starring: Shanaya Kapoor; Divik Sharma; Abhinav Singh; Manya Grover; Deeya Damini
- Country of origin: India
- Original language: Hindi
- No. of seasons: 1
- No. of episodes: 6

Production
- Executive producers: Somen Mishra; Reema Maya
- Producers: Karan Johar; Adar Poonawalla; Apoorva Mehta
- Cinematography: Harshvir Oberai
- Editor: Rohan Kapoor
- Camera setup: Multi-camera
- Production company: Dharmatic Entertainment

Original release
- Network: JioHotstar
- Release: 13 November 2026

Student of the Year: After Dark is an 2026 Indian Hindi-language thriller television series directed by Reema Maya and produced by Karan Johar under Dharmatic Entertainment. A spin-off of Student of the Year franchise, it stars Shanaya Kapoor, Divik Sharma, Abhinav Singh, Manya Grover and Deeya Damini. The series premiered on JioHotstar on 13 November 2026.

== Cast ==
- Shanaya Kapoor as Aditi Malik/Aayesha Malik
- Divik Sharma as Siddharth 'Sid' Saraiya
- Abhinav Singh as Rehaan Rizvi
- Manya Grover as Tara Barman
- Deeya Damini as Smriti 'Babydoll' Bisht
- Adi Malik
- Abhishekh Khan
- Sheeba Chaddha as Aisha/Aditi's mother
- Khalid Siddiqui as Aditi's Father
- Neeraj Kabi as Sid's father/ former Student of the year
- Vivek Gomber

== Production ==
=== Development ===
In July 2019, Karan Johar was reportedly considering ideas for the potential series for a streaming platform. In February 2020, Dharma Productions was developing a spin-off series for Netflix, although nothing was officially confirmed. Around the same time, media reports subsequently linked Suhana Khan and Asim Riaz to the project, but Johar dismissed the speculation. In April 2024, Johar said that filmmaker Reema Maya was working on the series adaptation based on the 2012 film.

The series was officially announced by JioHotstar, with Reema Mayaserving as creator and director, while Dharmatic Entertainment managed the production. It was subsequently titled as "Student of the Year: After Dark".

=== Casting ===
In February 2020, Alaya F had been signed for a role, but the project did not move forward. In July 2023, Shanaya Kapoor would sign on the project for JioHotstar. In May 2024, Ankita Lokhande had declined an offer to star in the project; Lokhande subsequently denied, stating that she had never been part of the project.

In January 2025, Alaya F was in talks to appear. However, discussions fell through due to other commitments. That month, auditions were underway for the male lead. In March 2025, Kapoor would play a double role. In March 2025, Tusharr Khanna had auditioned for the role. In November 2025, Divik Sharma was added to the cast.

=== Filming ===
In April 2025, the series would be filmed on a start-to-finish schedule. Before its official announcement, the series had been reworked to serve as a youth drama.

== Music ==
Student of the Year: After Dark

Soundtrack album by: Achint Thakkar; Chaar Diwaari; Ninja; Shirish Prakash Singh; Night Song
- Released: November 12, 2026
- Genre: Soundtrack
- Length: 22:46
- Language: Hindi
- Label: Sony Music
External audio
- Student of the Year - After Dark (Original Series Soundtrack) playlist on YouTube

The soundtrack for Student of the Year: After Dark is composed by Achint Thakkar, Chaar Diwaari, Ninja, Shirish Prakash Singh, and Night Song. The first single from the soundtrack, "Jo Bhi Hona Hai Ho Jaayega", performed by Chaar Diwaari and Samad Khan, was released on 5 November 2026. The second single, "Tere Liye Marjaawan", performed by Jonita Gandhi, was released on 12 November 2026.

Track listing
No.	Title	Lyrics	Music	Singer(s)	Length
1.	"Jo Bhi Hona Hai Ho Jayega"	Chaar Diwaari, Samad Khan	Chaar Diwaari, Samad Khan	Chaar Diwaari, Samad Khan	3:15
2.	"Tere Liye Marjaawan"	Achint, Arushi Kaushal	Achint Thakkar	Jonita Gandhi	3:11
3.	"Paanchi"	Ninja	Ninja	Ninja	2:30
4.	"Baaghan"	Shirish	Shirish	Shirish	2:28
5.	"Lukk Chupp"	Arushi Kaushal	Achint	Yashika Sikka	2:21
6.	"Farsh Pe Khoon"	Reema Maya	Achint	Jonita Gandhi	4:08
7.	"Bandook"	Raghav M Kumar, Marzi	Achint	Mahlan Wala 59, Marzi	2:49
8.	"Burn The Place Down"	Pratika	Night Song	Pratika	2:04
Total length:					22:46

== Release ==
The teaser of the series was released on 19 October 2026, followed by the trailer on 27 October 2026. It received mixed reactions, with criticism over casting Kapoor; although some viewers expressed interest for the genre shift.

The series was made available to stream on JioHotstar from 13 November 2026 as part of the Hotstar Specials.
