= The Pool (2018 film) =

2018 Thai film by Ping Lumpraploeng

- Theatrical release poster
- Directed by: Ping Lumpraploeng
- Written by: Ping Lumpraploeng
- Starring: Theeradej Wongpuapan; Ratnamon Ratchiratham
- Release date: September 26, 2018
- Running time: 90 minutes

The Pool (Thai: นรก 6 เมตร, lit. 'Hell 6 Meters') is a 2018 Thai horror thriller film directed by Ping Lumpraploeng, starring Theeradej Wongpuapan and Ratnamon Ratchiratham. The film revolves around a couple who is trapped in a 6 meter deep pool after the water is drained out. Their situation worsens when a crocodile enters the pool with them. It received positive reviews.

The film was remade in India as Tu Yaa Main (2026) by Bejoy Nambiar.

== Plot ==
The film opens with a man named Day, who is lying in a drained pool with several injuries to his body. He looks down and screams as a crocodile bites down on his leg.

Six days earlier, Day is working on a photoshoot in the same pool, which is full of water. His girlfriend Koy and his dog Lucky wait for him to finish.

The following morning, Day clears the pool of the props used for the photoshoot and relaxes on an inflatable raft, with Lucky tied to a leash nearby. Day is advised by his boss that the pool is being drained, so he will need to get out soon. Day ends up falling asleep, and by the time he wakes up, the water level is too low for him to get out. He attempts to climb out, but the bare pool didn’t have any ladders or handrails, only to severely injure the nail of his right index finger. He screams for help, but no one is around to hear him.

The next day, while Day is asleep on the raft, Koi shows up to surprise him. Not noticing the lowered water level, she jumps into the pool before Day can warn her, but she slips and hits her head on the diving board. Day pulls her onto the raft and tends to her while she is unconscious. That night a crocodile appears and crawls towards Lucky but slips on some metal pipes by the side of the pool and falls in.

By the morning, the water has completely drained, and the couple are alone in the pool with nothing but a sofa left over from the shoot. Day bandages Koi's wound with duct tape that he takes from the sleeping crocodile's mouth. He uses Koy's necklace to unscrew the pool's drain cover to find an exit, but the crocodile climbs in ahead of him. Day braves the drain tunnels and finds a small pumping station where a ladder leads to a locked grate on the surface above the pool. He makes it back to the pool just in time to prevent the crocodile attacking Koi. Koi wakes up and it is revealed that she is pregnant.

The next morning, Day loses consciousness as result of the heat, hunger, and the lack of his diabetes medication. He wakes later that night, and Koi informs him that the crocodile has laid several eggs inside the pool with them. They manage to trap the crocodile in the drain and proceed to start a fire, which enables them to cook and eat the eggs.

Tension starts to arise between the two as they try and fail to escape from the pool, and after Day admits to feeling he would not be a good father, and to wanting Koi to have an abortion. Koi berates him and inspires him to prove his worth by saving them.

On the fifth day the couple release the crocodile back into the pool and enter the drain system themselves. They manage to open the grate a few inches and Day salvages an insulin shot, which was accidentally dropped into the grate a few days earlier.

Seeing what he believes is a drone, Day leaves Koi in the pumping station and makes his way back to the pool, only to discover it's a remote-controlled glider. He notices a line of barbed wire has been blown over and he attempts to climb it but falls and breaks his leg. He fashions a splint from pieces wood and duct tape and falls unconscious. He later wakes with severely lacerated hands, and with the crocodile chewing his broken leg in the image we saw in the opening scene. Day manages to beat the animal away with a bucket.

That night it rains heavily, and the pumping station starts to fill with water with Koi inside. Day evades the crocodile and makes it back into the drain tunnels, but this time goes the opposite way to the pumping station. He finds a grate, which he manages to open, but emerges in an adjacent pool, also empty. Distraught and weak, he crawls back into the drain tunnel and falls asleep.

On the morning of the seventh day, two men arrive after their remote-controlled glider gets stuck at the bottom of the empty pool. They fix a bamboo ladder to a pile of concrete pipes and climb down. Once in the pool, they notice blood stains and the word 'help' written in duct tape, but decide to leave anyway.

Awoken by their talking, Day makes his way toward the ladder but is attacked by the crocodile. He fends off the animal, but the concrete pipes slip in the heavy rain and the ladder is completely retracted. With the rainwater now dangerously high in the pumping station and the crocodile attacking once more, Day collapses in defeat. The crocodile bites his torso and is about to bite his head when Koi blows a whistle through the grate just as the rainwater submerges her entirely. The sound makes Lucky jump into the pool, but as he is tethered, he hangs himself on his leash. Day impales the crocodile's mouth with the leg of the sofa, and kills her with a metal pipe. He uses Lucky's body and leash to climb out of the pool and pries open the grate to the pumping station, rescuing Koi before she drowns.

== Cast ==
- Theeradej Wongpuapan as Day
- Ratnamon Ratchiratham as Koi

== Reception ==
The review aggregation website Rotten Tomatoes gave the film a "Fresh" score of 96% from 23 critics, with an average rating of 7.23 out of 10.
