= Dhruv Visvanath =

Indian musician

- Born: 1992 (age 33–34)
- Origin: New Delhi, India
- Instruments: vocals, guitar
- Years active: 2008–present
- Formerly of: Cobbled Street
- Website: mrdhruv.com

Dhruv Visvanath is a musician and producer from New Delhi, India, who came to prominence after he was named a finalist in the first season of My Kind of Country.

== Early life ==
Visvanath was born in Delhi, but grew up with living between England, Zambia, Bombay, and Hong Kong with his family due to his father's job at HSBC Bank. He began playing the piano at age 7 and the guitar at age 13.

== Career ==
In 2014, Visvanath was named to Acoustic Guitar's "30 Great Guitarists Under 30 list".

In 2015, Visvanath released his first album, Orion; which All About The Rock gave a 9 out of 10 rating and called, "an exceptional collection of electro-acoustic songs that are both emotional and uplifting."

In 2016, Visvanath performed a 17-city tour for his project, The Lost Cause, which was released as an album in 2018. The Lost Cause was selected by Rolling Stone as one of the "Best Indian Albums of 2018".

In 2022, Visvanath released his EP, Demons, which A Humming Heart granted an 8/10 rating and wrote was, "darker, more deliberate and replete with renewed vulnerability, every one of the four tracks on the EP takes Dhruv's musical purpose of "healing", further and further as he faces his fears with every line."

In 2023, after being discovered by country musician, Jimmie Allen, Visvanath competed on My Kind of Country, an Apple TV+ singing competition set in Nashville, Tennessee. Visvanath ranked in the final four contestants on the show.

== Discography ==
=== As lead artist ===
Albums
Title	Year	Source
The Book of I	2021	
The Lost Cause	2018	
Orion	2015	

Extended plays
Title	Year	Source
Demons	2022	
Chronicles	2011	

Singles
Title	Year	Source
"Ring of Fire"	2023	
"Neon Moon"	2023	
"Demons"	2022	
"Monster"	2022	
"Suffocation"	2022	
"Fly"	2021	
"Write"	2020	
"Dear Madeline"	2020	
"Standing Still"	2019	
"Autumn"	2018	
"Afterglow"	2018	
"The Lost Cause"	2018	
"Jungle"	2018	
"Wild"	2018	
"Rain"	2018	
"Chaos"	2017	
"Summer"	2016	

=== As featured artist ===
Singles
Title	Artist	Year	Source
"Decay – Redux"	Manas Jha	2023	
"Under Cover"	Aditya N., Nayantara Bhatkal, Class	2023	
"Raatein Soyi Hain"	Pragya Sodhani	2022	
"Start Again"	Jay Visvanath	2022	
"Honey It's Over"	Antriksh Mohapatra	2021	
"Lie Awake"	Jay Visvanath	2021	
"King"	Jay Visvanath	2020	
"Watercolour"	Sanjeeta Bhattacharya	2020	
"Dear Santa"	Kimberley Rodrigues ft Christine Dessa	2020	
"For Now"	Nikhita	2019	
''Aa Jhoom"	Kimberley Rodrigues	2019	
"Ozone"	Yatin Srivastava	2018	

== Filmography ==
Production
Title	Year	Type	Role	Source
Friday Night Plan	2023	Netflix film	Music Director	
My Kind of Country	2023	reality game show	Contestant	
Rizwan - Keeper Of The Gates of Heaven	2016	Short film	Sound designer	
