= Ek Din =

2026 Indian film by Sunil Pandey

- Theatrical release poster
- Directed by: Sunil Pandey
- Written by: Sneha Desai; Spandan Mishra
- Based on: One Day by Banjong Pisanthanakun
- Produced by: Mansoor Khan; Aamir Khan; Aparna Purohit
- Starring: Sai Pallavi; Junaid Khan
- Cinematography: Manoj Lobo
- Edited by: Ballu Saluja
- Music by: Ram Sampath
- Production company: Aamir Khan Productions
- Distributed by: PVR Inox Pictures (India); AA Films (International)
- Release date: 1 May 2026
- Running time: 125 minutes
- Country: India
- Language: Hindi
- Budget: ₹25 crore
- Box office: est. ₹5.08 crore

Ek Din (transl. One Day) is a 2026 Indian Hindi-language romantic drama film directed by Sunil Pandey and produced by Mansoor Khan, Aamir Khan, and Aparna Purohit under Aamir Khan Productions. The film stars Sai Pallavi (in her Hindi film debut) and Junaid Khan in lead roles. It is a remake of the 2016 Thai film One Day.

Ek Din was released on 1 May 2026. It received largely negative reviews from critics and was a box office bomb.

== Cast ==
- Sai Pallavi as Meera Ranganathan
- Junaid Khan as Dinesh "Dino" Shrivastava
- Kunal Kapoor as Nakul Bhasin
- Kavin Dave as Samarjit "Sam" Hathiramani
- Reshma Shetty as Ketki Patel
- Jenifer Emmanuel as Ritu
- Astha Gulati as Priya
- Neha Vyaso as Monu
- Chakori Dwivedi as Meenu
- Raju Patel as Yadav Ji
- Samta Sagar as Dino's mother
- Pragati Mishra as Shruti
- Rajendra Jadhav as Janitor

== Production ==
The film was shot in Sapporo, Japan, utilizing the snowy landscape to enhance the visual appeal. The Japan schedule of the film was wrapped in March 2024. The Mumbai schedule began in the same month, with filming taking place in Film City.

== Soundtrack ==
Ek Din

Soundtrack album by Ram Sampath
- Released: 6 April 2026
- Genre: Feature film soundtrack
- Length: 23:46
- Language: Hindi
- Label: Zee Music Company
External audio
- Official Audio Jukebox on YouTube

The film's soundtrack was composed by Ram Sampath, with lyrics written by Irshad Kamil. Though Arijit Singh had formally announced his departure from playback singing, he provided vocals to five tracks in the film honoring the earlier commitment.

Track listing
No.	Title	Singer(s)	Length
1.	"Ek Din Title Track"	Arijit Singh	4:22
2.	"Khwaab Dekhoon"	Arijit Singh, Tarannum Malik Jain	4:13
3.	"Konichiwa"	Arijit Singh, Neha Karode, Rishi Singh	3:08
4.	"Behke Yaar"	Arijit Singh, Meghna Mishra	3:39
5.	"Tadapnaa Judaa Judaa"	Arijit Singh	3:41
6.	"Ek Din Title Track (Female)"	Meghna Mishra	4:27
Total length:			23:30

== Release ==
Ek Din was scheduled to release on 7 November 2025, however it was postponed to 1 May 2026. It was dubbed in Tamil and Telugu under the titles Oru Naal and Okka Roju respectively.

The digital rights of the film were bagged by Amazon Prime Video.

== Reception ==
Subhash K Jha gave film 3 and 1/2 stars and wrote that the film is like an "elegantly arranged symphony whose notes are not particularly profound. But they suggest an enduring harmony between the location and the heart. And if all fails — and that’s not the case here — there is always Sai Pallavi, an actress so far ahead of the competition she makes the rest look like cheerleaders”. Anuj Kumar of The Hindu wrote "At a time when the box office menu is brimming with masala entertainers, Ek Din tastes like a palate cleanser, blending mood and memory with a touch of magic". Rahul Desai of The Hollywood Reporter India opined that "There's a lack of interiority — a cultural emptiness in the storytelling (the rest of the album fails to register) — that stops the love from transcending the story".

Shubhra Gupta of The Indian Express gave 2 out of 5 stars, writing that the film wasn't "outright bad. It attempts to revive clean, old-school romance in Bollywood, standing apart from the industry’s current wave of hyper-violent and misogynistic themes". Vineeta Kumar of India Today gave 2 out of 5 stars, and wrote that the film's "striking Japan backdrop cannot compensate for thin writing and a romance that never convinces". Rishabh Suri of Hindustan Times gave 2.5 out of 5 stars, writing "While the first half is engaging, the second falters with a confusing climax. Sai Pallavi shines, but the film lacks lasting emotional impact". Sahir Advik D'Souza of The Quint gave 1 out of 5 stars, writing "It is impossible to take this premise seriously—or the film at large, despite its blue-chip backing by Aamir Khan".
